= List of shipwrecks in March 1917 =

The list of shipwrecks in March 1917 includes ships sunk, foundered, grounded, or otherwise lost during March 1917.

== 1 March ==
List of shipwrecks: 1 March 1917
Ship	State	Description
Apollonia	Italy	World War I: The cargo ship struck a mine placed by SM UC-32 (Imperial German Navy) and sank in the North Sea one nautical mile (1.9 km) east of Flamborough Head, Yorkshire, United Kingdom (54°10′N 0°04′W). Her crew survived.
Bout de Zan	France	World War I: The fishing vessel was shelled and damaged by SM UC-65 (Imperial German Navy) in the English Channel six nautical miles (11 km) west of Berck, Pas-de-Calais. She was abandoned by her crew and came ashore at Dungeness, Kent, United Kingdom where she was declared a total loss.
Chatburn	United Kingdom	World War I: The cargo ship was sunk by torpedo in the English Channel 22 nautical miles (41 km) north east of Cape Barfleur, Manche, France (50°00′N 0°55′W) by SM UB-18 (Imperial German Navy). Her crew survived.
Diamond Cross	Belgium	World War I: The fishing vessel was shelled and sunk in the English Channel west of Berck by SM UC-65 (Imperial German Navy). Her crew survived.
Drina	United Kingdom	World War I: The passenger ship struck a mine placed by SM UC-65 (Imperial German Navy) and sank in the Irish Sea two nautical miles (3.7 km) west of Skokholm, Pembrokeshire (51°41′N 5°20′W) with the loss of fifteen lives.
Elise II	France	World War I: The fishing vessel was shelled and sunk in the English Channel eight nautical miles (15 km) off Cayeux-sur-Mer, Somme by SM UC-65 (Imperial German Navy). Her crew survived.
Elorn	France	World War I: The coaster was shelled and sunk in the English Channel 6 nautical miles (11 km) north north east of Le Tréport, Seine-Inférieure (50°11′N 1°24′E) by SM UC-65 (Imperial German Navy) with the loss of two of her crew.
General Radiguet	France	World War I: The fishing vessel was scuttled in the English Channel 2 nautical miles (3.7 km) north north west of Cayeux-sur-Mer by SM UC-65 (Imperial German Navy). Her crew survived.
Germaine	France	World War I: The trawler was scuttled in the English Channel 6 nautical miles (11 km) west of Berck by SM UC-65 (Imperial German Navy).
HMHS Glenart Castle	Royal Navy	World War I: The hospital ship struck a mine placed by SM UC-65 (Imperial German Navy) and was damaged in the English Channel 8 nautical miles (15 km) north west of the Owers Lightship (United Kingdom). She was repaired and returned to service.
Gurre	Norway	World War I: The cargo ship was sunk in the North Sea (59°30′N 2°00′E) by SM U-66 (Imperial German Navy) with the loss of twenty crew.
Herbert Ingram	United Kingdom	World War I: The trawler was scuttled in the North Sea 70 nautical miles (130 km) east of the Longstone Lighthouse, Northumberland (55°59′N 0°25′E) by SM UC-29 (Imperial German Navy). Her crew survived.
Homocea	France	World War I: The trawler was shelled and sunk in the English Channel 7 nautical miles (13 km) north north west of Cayeux-sur-Mer by SM UC-65 (Imperial German Navy). Her crew survived.
Josephine Adolphine	France	World War I: The fishing vessel was scuttled in the English Channel 2 nautical miles (3.7 km) north west of Cayeux-sur-Mer by SM UC-65 (Imperial German Navy). Her crew survived.
Jumna	United Kingdom	World War I: The cargo ship was scuttled in the Indian Ocean 650 nautical miles (1,200 km) west of Minicoy, India by SMS Wolf (Imperial German Navy).
Mabella	Norway	World War I: The full-rigged ship was sunk in the Atlantic Ocean 24 nautical miles (44 km) south south west of Old Head of Kinsale, County Cork, United Kingdom (51°13′N 9°04′W) by SM UC-43 (Imperial German Navy). Her crew survived.
Munificent	United Kingdom	World War I: The collier was sunk by torpedo in the English Channel 3.5 nautical miles (6.5 km) off Cap Gris Nez, Pas-de-Calais, France by a Kaiserliche Marine submarine.
N.D. de Lourdes	France	World War I: The fishing vessel was shelled and sunk in the English Channel 6 nautical miles (11 km) west of Berck by SM UC-65 (Imperial German Navy).
Nicolaos	Greece	World War I: The cargo ship was sunk in the Mediterranean Sea south of Sardinia, Italy by SM U-65 (Imperial German Navy).
Norma	Norway	World War I: The barque was shelled and sunk in the North Sea 4 nautical miles (7.4 km) east by north of the Shetland Islands by SM U-58 (Imperial German Navy) with the loss of a crew member.
Orion	Norway	World War I: The cargo ship was sunk in the North Sea (55°58′N 0°51′E) by SM UC-41 (Imperial German Navy) with the loss of nineteen of her crew.
HMS Pheasant	Royal Navy	World War I: The Admiralty M-class destroyer struck a mine placed by SM U-80 (Imperial German Navy) and sank in the Atlantic Ocean west of the Orkney Islands with the loss of 88 crew.
Redcap	United Kingdom	World War I: The trawler was shelled and sunk in the North Sea 97 nautical miles (180 km) east of the Longstone Lighthouse (56°10′N 1°10′E) by SM UC-29 (Imperial German Navy) with the loss of a crew member.
Reine des Anges	France	World War I: The trawler was sunk in the English Channel 6 nautical miles (11 km) west of Berck by SM UC-65 (Imperial German Navy). Her crew survived.
Sainte Famille	France	World War I: The fishing vessel was shelled and sunk in the English Channel off Boulogne, Pas-de-Calais by SM UC-65 (Imperial German Navy). Her crew survived.
Saint Joseph	France	World War I: The fishing vessel was sunk in the English Channel south of Boulogne by SM UC-65 (Imperial German Navy).
Seigneur	France	World War I: The fishing vessel was shelled and sunk in the English Channel west of Berck by SM UC-65 (Imperial German Navy).
Storenes	Norway	World War I: The barque was scuttled in the Atlantic Ocean south west of the Old Head of Kinsale by SM UC-43 (Imperial German Navy). Her crew survived.
Teresina	Italy	World War I: The brigantine was scuttled in the Mediterranean Sea south of Sardinia by SM U-65 (Imperial German Navy). Her crew survived.
Tillycorthie	United Kingdom	World War I: The coaster was shelled and sunk in the North Sea off the Longstone Lighthouse, Northumberland by SM UC-41 (Imperial German Navy). Her crew survived.

== 2 March ==
List of shipwrecks: 2 March 1917
Ship	State	Description
Edvard Greig	Norway	World War I: The coaster was sunk in the North Sea (57°10′N 4°05′E) by SM U-61 (Imperial German Navy) with the loss of fifteen crew.
Erlangen	Imperial German Navy	World War I: The minesweeper struck a mine and sank in the North Sea off Ameland in the West Frisian Islands off the coast of the Netherlands.
Gazelle	United Kingdom	World War I: The ketch was scuttled in the English Channel 20 nautical miles (37 km) south south west of Dungeness, Kent by SM U-53 (Imperial German Navy). Her crew survived.
S. Vincenzo F.	Italy	World War I: The sailing vessel was sunk in the Strait of Sicily by SM U-65 (Imperial German Navy).
Utopia	United Kingdom	World War I: The sailing vessel was shelled and sunk in the English Channel 20 nautical miles (37 km) south south west of Dungeness (50°31′N 0°39′E) by SM U-53 (Imperial German Navy). Her crew survived.

== 3 March ==
List of shipwrecks: 3 March 1917
Ship	State	Description
S. Anna S.	Italy	World War I: The sailing vessel was sunk in the Strait of Sicily by SM U-39 (Imperial German Navy).
Connaught	United Kingdom	World War I: The troopship was sunk by torpedo in the English Channel 29 nautical miles (54 km) south of the Owers Lightship (United Kingdom) (50°08′N 0°45′W) by SM U-48 (Imperial German Navy) with the loss of three crew.
Craigendoran	United Kingdom	World War I: The collier was sunk by torpedo in the Mediterranean Sea 6 nautical miles (11 km) east of Cape Sigli, Algeria by SM UC-37 (Imperial German Navy) with the loss of three of her crew. Two of the survivors were taken as prisoners of war.
Hermes	Norway	World War I: The sailing vessel was sunk in the North Sea 10 nautical miles (19 km) off of Utsira, Rogaland by SM U-80 (Imperial German Navy) with the loss of twelve crew.
Kincardine	United Kingdom	World War I: The collier was sunk by torpedo in the Atlantic Ocean 20 nautical miles (37 km) north east of Tearaght Island, County Donegal (52°22′N 10°26′W) by SM U-70 (Imperial German Navy). Her crew survived.
Meldon	United Kingdom	World War I: The collier struck a mine placed by SM U-78 (Imperial German Navy) and was damaged in the Firth of Lorn (56°20′N 5°56′W). She was taken in tow but sank at the mouth of Loch Buie. Her crew survived.
Newstead	United Kingdom	World War I: The cargo ship was sunk by torpedo in the Atlantic Ocean 150 nautical miles (280 km) west north west of the Fastnet Rock (52°02′N 13°24′W) by SM U-49 (Imperial German Navy) with the loss of fifteen crew.
HMT Northumbria	Royal Navy	World War I: The naval trawler struck a mine placed by SM UC-29 (Imperial German Navy) and sank in the Firth of Forth 1 nautical mile (1.9 km) north of the Isle of May, Fife (56°12′25″N 2°34′00″W) with the loss of five of her crew.
Ring	Norway	World War I: The coaster was sunk in the North Sea 4 nautical miles (7.4 km) east by south of Berwick-upon-Tweed, Northumberland, United Kingdom (59°49′42″N 1°54′50″W) by SM UC-41 (Imperial German Navy). Her crew survived.
River Forth	United Kingdom	World War I: The collier was torpedoed and sunk in the Mediterranean Sea 60 nautical miles (110 km) south by east of Malta (34°54′N 15°00′E) by SM UC-35 (Imperial German Navy) with the loss of two of her crew.
Rosborg	Norway	World War I: The cargo ship was sunk in the North Sea (58°40′N 0°15′W) by SM U-61 (Imperial German Navy) with the loss of six crew.
Sagamore	United Kingdom	World War I: The cargo ship was torpedoed and sunk in the Atlantic Ocean 150 nautical miles (280 km) west of the Fastnet Rock (51°50′N 14°00′W) by SM U-49 (Imperial German Navy) with the loss of 52 crew.
Setubal	Portugal	The cargo ship was wrecked. Her crew survived.
Theodoros Panaglos	Greece	World War I: The cargo ship was shelled and sunk in the English Channel 30 nautical miles (56 km) south south west of The Lizard, Cornwall, United Kingdom (49°40′N 5°30′W) by SM U-53 (Imperial German Navy). Her crew survived.

== 4 March ==
List of shipwrecks: 4 March 1917
Ship	State	Description
Harold Blekum	United States	During a voyage from Kodiak, Territory of Alaska, to Seattle, Washington carrying a crew of eight and 100 tons of cargo including empty gasoline drums, the 192-gross register ton schooner drifted ashore and was wrecked in Ugak Bay (57°48′N 154°04′W) on the coast of Kodiak Island in the Kodiak Archipelago after losing both her anchors the previous day.
Jumna	United Kingdom	World War I: The steamer was captured on 1 March and scuttled on 4 March by SMS Wolf (Imperial German Navy).
Narcis	Belgium	The cargo ship sprang a leak in the Atlantic Ocean. She developed a 32° list on 5 March, and was abandoned on 6 March at 49°30′N 22°17′W. Narcis was later sunk by gunfire from Taramac (United Kingdom) as she was a danger to navigation.
The Macbain	United Kingdom	World War I: The barquentine was scuttled in the English Channel 20 nautical miles (37 km) south of Portland Bill, Dorset by SM U-48 (Imperial German Navy). Her crew survived.
Rhodanthe	United Kingdom	World War I: The cargo ship was sunk in the Atlantic Ocean 330 nautical miles (610 km) north north west of the Cape Verde Islands, Portugal by SMS Möwe (Imperial German Navy). Her crew were taken as prisoners of war.
Turritella	United Kingdom	World War I: The cargo ship was scuttled in the Indian Ocean by SMS Wolf (Imperial German Navy).

== 5 March ==
List of shipwrecks: 5 March 1917
Ship	State	Description
Bessie J.	United States	The barge sank at the Darrow Mann Coal Pier, Mystic Wharf, Charlestown, Massachusetts. Raised, repaired and returned to service.
HMT Campania II	Royal Navy	The naval trawler was lost on this date with the loss of all hands.
Copenhagen	United Kingdom	World War I: The passenger ship was torpedoed and sunk in the North Sea 8 nautical miles (15 km) east of the Noord Hinder Lightship (Netherlands) by SM UC-61 (Imperial German Navy) with the loss of six lives.
Dupleix	France	World War I: The barque was captured and sunk with explosives by SMS Seeadler (Imperial German Navy).
Federico Confalonieri	Italy	World War I: The cargo ship was sunk in the Atlantic Ocean south west of Ireland (51°50′N 13°32′W) by SM U-53 (Imperial German Navy).
Guadiana	Portugal	World War I: The sailing vessel was set afire and sunk in the Atlantic Ocean south of Ireland by SM UC-44 (Imperial German Navy).
SMS Iltis	Imperial German Navy	World War I: The auxiliary cruiser was shelled and sunk off Aden by HMS Odin (Royal Navy), or scuttled to prevent capture. The crew were rescued and made prisoners of war.
Salvatore	Italy	World War I: The sailing vessel was sunk in the Malta Channel by SM UC-37 (Imperial German Navy).

== 6 March ==
List of shipwrecks: 6 March 1917
Ship	State	Description
Caldergrove	United Kingdom	World War I: The cargo ship was torpedoed and sunk in the Atlantic Ocean 200 nautical miles (370 km) west north west of the Fastnet Rock (51°30′N 14°51′W) by SM U-44 (Imperial German Navy) with the loss of nineteen crew.
Cornelia	United Kingdom	World War I: The coaster was shelled and sunk in the Atlantic Ocean 9 nautical miles (17 km) of the Skellig Islands, County Kerry (51°47′N 10°43′W) by SM UC-43 (Imperial German Navy). Her crew survived.
Fenay Lodge	United Kingdom	World War I: The cargo ship was torpedoed and sunk in the Atlantic Ocean 250 nautical miles (460 km) north west of the Fastnet Rock (51°24′N 16°11′W) by SM U-44 (Imperial German Navy) with the loss of four crew.
Porto di Smirne	Italy	World War I: The cargo ship was sunk in the Mediterranean Sea 150 nautical miles (280 km) south west of Cape Matapan, Greece by SM U-65 (Imperial German Navy).
Sawa Maru	Japan	World War I: The cargo ship was torpedoed and sunk in the Atlantic Ocean 30 nautical miles (56 km) west of Bull Rock, County Cork, United Kingdom by SM UC-43 (Imperial German Navy). Her crew survived.

== 7 March ==
List of shipwrecks: 7 March 1917
Ship	State	Description
Adalands	Norway	World War I: The cargo ship was sunk in the Atlantic Ocean 8 nautical miles (15 km) south west of the Fastnet Rock by SM UC-44 (Imperial German Navy). Her crew survived.
Antonio	United Kingdom	World War I: The cargo ship struck a mine placed by SM UC-17 (Imperial German Navy) and sank in the English Channel 7 nautical miles (13 km) off Dartmouth, Devon with the loss of eleven of her crew.
Baron Wemyss	United Kingdom	World War I: The cargo ship was torpedoed and sunk in the Atlantic Ocean 73 nautical miles (135 km) north west by west of the Fastnet Rock (51°40′N 11°30′W) by SM UC-43 (Imperial German Navy) with the loss of two of her crew.
Naamah	United Kingdom	World War I: The trawler was shelled and sunk in the North Sea 35 nautical miles (65 km) south by east of North Ronaldsay, Orkney Islands by SM UC-76 (Imperial German Navy). Her crew survived.
Navarra	Norway	World War I: The cargo ship was shelled and sunk in the Atlantic Ocean south of the Eddystone Lighthouse, Cornwall, United Kingdom (49°36′N 4°12′W) by SM U-48 (Imperial German Navy) with the loss of nineteen crew.
Ohio	France	World War I: The cargo ship was torpedoed and sunk in the Atlantic Ocean 152 nautical miles (282 km) north west of the Skellig Islands, County Kerry, United Kingdom (51°45′N 14°30′W) by SM U-44 (Imperial German Navy).
HMT Vivanti	Royal Navy	The naval trawler was lost on this date.
Vulcana	United Kingdom	World War I: The trawler was shelled and sunk in the North Sea 40 nautical miles (74 km) east south east of the Auskerry Lighthouse, Orkney Islands by SM UC-76 (Imperial German Navy) with the loss of two of her crew.
Westwick	United Kingdom	World War I: The cargo ship struck a mine placed by SM UC-44 (Imperial German Navy) and sank in the Irish Sea 1 nautical mile (1.9 km) south of Roche Point, Queenstown, County Cork. Her crew survived.

== 8 March ==
List of shipwrecks: 8 March 1917
Ship	State	Description
Ares	Netherlands	World War I: The tanker was sunk in the Atlantic Ocean 40 nautical miles (74 km) west of Cascais, Portugal (38°12′N 10°19′W) by SM UC-74 (Imperial German Navy).
Dunbarmoor	United Kingdom	World War I: The cargo ship was shelled and sunk in the Atlantic Ocean 180 nautical miles (330 km) west north west of the Fastnet Rock (51°22′N 14°31′W) by SM U-44 (Imperial German Navy) with the loss of twelve crew.
Frank Pendleton	United States	The schooner barge was wrecked in the Main Channel into the Harbor of New York City abreast Buoy No. 8, near the Swash Channel, a total loss.
Georgian	United Kingdom	World War I: The cargo ship was torpedoed and sunk in the Mediterranean Sea 52 nautical miles (96 km) north of Cape Sidero, Crete, Greece (36°13′N 26°05′W) by SM UB-47 (Imperial German Navy) with the loss of five of her crew.
Silas	Norway	World War I: The barque was sunk in the Atlantic Ocean off the west coast of Ireland (52°10′N 16°00′W) by SM U-44 (Imperial German Navy). Her crew survived.
Storstad	United Kingdom	World War I: The collier was sunk in the Atlantic Ocean 45 nautical miles (83 km) west south west of the Fastnet Rock (51°20′N 11°50′W) by SM U-62 (Imperial German Navy) with the loss of three crew.
Vega	Russia	World War I: The barque was sunk in the Atlantic Ocean west of the Bishop Rock, Isles of Scilly (51°00′N 12°00′W) by SM U-62 (Imperial German Navy).

== 9 March ==
List of shipwrecks: 9 March 1917
Ship	State	Description
Abeja	United Kingdom	World War I: The schooner was shelled and sunk in the English Channel 20 nautical miles (37 km) south west by south of Start Point (49°53′N 3°42′W) by SM U-48 (Imperial German Navy). Her crew survived.
Cavour	Italy	World War I: The cargo ship was torpedoed and sunk in the Atlantic Ocean off Ireland (51°15′N 6°55′W) by SM U-53 (Imperial German Navy). Her crew survived.
Dana	Norway	World War I: The coaster was sunk in the North Sea 5 nautical miles (9.3 km) south of Sumburgh Head, Shetland Islands, United Kingdom by SM UC-76 (Imperial German Navy). Her crew survived.
East Point	United Kingdom	World War I: The cargo ship was torpedoed and sunk in the Atlantic Ocean 9 nautical miles (17 km) east by south of the Eddystone Lighthouse by SM U-48 (Imperial German Navy). Her crew survived.
HMS Fauvette	Royal Navy	World War I: The armed boarding steamer struck a mine placed by SM UC-7 (Imperial German Navy) and sank in The Downs (51°24′N 1°29′E with the loss of fourteen of her crew.
Inverlogie	United Kingdom	World War I: The barque was sunk by torpedo in the Atlantic Ocean 15 nautical miles (28 km) south west of the Smalls Lighthouse by SM U-70 (Imperial German Navy). Her crew survived.
Lars Fostenes	Norway	World War I: The cargo ship was sunk in the Atlantic Ocean off Cork, United Kingdom by SM U-53 (Imperial German Navy). Her crew survived.
Laurits	Denmark	World War I: The schooner was sunk in the Atlantic Ocean off Stornoway, Isle of Lewis, Outer Hebrides, United Kingdom by SM UC-43 (Imperial German Navy). Her crew survived.
Spartan	Norway	World War I: The barque was sunk by torpedo in the Atlantic Ocean 75 nautical miles (139 km) south west of the Fastnet Rock (50°26′N 10°45′W) by SM U-61 (Imperial German Navy). Her crew survived.

== 10 March ==
List of shipwrecks: 10 March 1917
Ship	State	Description
Algol	Norway	World War I: The coaster was shelled and sunk in the North Sea east of the Shetland Islands, United Kingdom (60°20′N 0°50′E) by SM U-81 (Imperial German Navy). Her eighteen crew took to the lifeboats but were not rescued.
Asbjørn	Norway	World War I: The cargo ship was sunk in the Atlantic Ocean 13 nautical miles (24 km) north north west of Ouessant, Finistère, France by SM UC-21 (Imperial German Navy). Her crew survived.
Angola	Portugal	World War I: The cargo ship was sunk in the Atlantic Ocean 112 nautical miles (207 km) south west of the Bishop Rock, Isles of Scilly, United Kingdom by SM U-61 (Imperial German Navy).
Esmereldas	United Kingdom	World War I: The cargo ship was sunk in the Atlantic Ocean 420 nautical miles (780 km) west of Lisbon, Portugal by SMS Möwe (Imperial German Navy). Her crew were taken as prisoners of war.
Guglielmotti	Italian Royal Navy	World War I: On her maiden voyage, the Pacinotti-class submarine was sunk in the Ligurian Sea northwest of Capraia by gunfire and ramming by the sloop HMS Cyclamen (Royal Navy) after Cyclamen mistook her for a German submarine.
James Burton Cook	United Kingdom	World War I: The schooner was shelled and sunk in the Mediterranean Sea 25 nautical miles (46 km) south south east of Málaga, Spain by SM UC-74 (Imperial German Navy). Her crew survived.
Marie	France	World War I: The schooner was sunk in the Atlantic Ocean 15 nautical miles (28 km) north of the Seven Stones reef by SM U-62 (Imperial German Navy).
Mediterranean	United Kingdom	World War I: The schooner was shelled and sunk in the Atlantic Ocean 13 nautical miles (24 km) south of Hook Point, County Waterford by SM U-70 (Imperial German Navy). Her crew survived.
Otaki	United Kingdom	Otaki World War I, Action of 10 March 1917: The refrigerated cargo liner was sunk by gunfire in the Atlantic Ocean 420 nautical miles (780 km) west of Lisbon by SMS Möwe (Imperial German Navy) with the loss of six of her crew. Survivors were taken as prisoners of war. Her captain was awarded a posthumous Victoria Cross for his action in attacking Möwe.
Skreien	Norway	World War I: The coaster was scuttled in the North Sea 60 nautical miles (110 km) east of Lerwick, Shetland Islands by SM U-81 (Imperial German Navy) with the loss of five of her crew.
T. Crowley	United Kingdom	World War I: The schooner was shelled and sunk in the Atlantic Ocean 12 nautical miles (22 km) south of Hook Point by SM U-70 (Imperial German Navy). Her crew survived.
SM UC-43	Imperial German Navy	World War I: The Type UC II submarine was sunk by torpedo in the North Sea north of Muckle Flugga, Shetland Islands, United Kingdom (60°57′N 1°11′W) by HMS G13 (Royal Navy) with the loss of all 26 crew.

== 11 March ==
List of shipwrecks: 11 March 1917
Ship	State	Description
Charles Le Cour	France	World War I: The cargo ship was sunk in the Atlantic Ocean 7 nautical miles (13 km) north north east of the Pendeen Lighthouse, Cornwall, United Kingdom (50°16′N 5°36′W) by SM UC-47 (Imperial German Navy). Her crew survived.
Folia	United Kingdom	World War I: The cargo liner was sunk by torpedo in the Atlantic Ocean 4 nautical miles (7.4 km) east south east of Ram Head by SM U-53 (Imperial German Navy) with the loss of seven crew.
G. A. Savage	United Kingdom	World War I: The coaster was sunk by torpedo in the Atlantic Ocean off Pendeen Point, Cornwall by SM UC-47 (Imperial German Navy) with the loss of all nine crew.
Gracia	Spain	World War I: The cargo ship was sunk in the Atlantic Ocean 5 nautical miles (9.3 km) south of Ballycotton, County Cork, United Kingdom by SM U-53 (Imperial German Navy). Her crew survived.
Horngarth	United Kingdom	World War I: The cargo ship was scuttled in the Atlantic Ocean 220 nautical miles (410 km) east north east of the St Paul Rocks, Brazil by SMS Seeadler (Imperial German Navy) with the loss of a crew member.
Kwasind	United Kingdom	World War I: The cargo ship struck a mine placed by SM UC-4 (Imperial German Navy) and sank in the North Sea off Southwold, Suffolk (52°08′N 1°45′E) with the loss of twelve of her crew.
Thrift	United Kingdom	World War I: The fishing smack was shelled and sunk in the Atlantic Ocean 15 nautical miles (28 km) west of Trevose Head, Cornwall (50°30′N 5°24′W) by SM U-62 (Imperial German Navy). Her crew survived.
Wordsworth	United Kingdom	World War I: The cargo ship was scuttled in the Indian Ocean 680 nautical miles (1,260 km) west of Mahé, Seychelles by SMS Wolf (Imperial German Navy).

== 12 March ==
List of shipwrecks: 12 March 1917
Ship	State	Description
Algonquin	United States	World War I: The cargo ship was sunk by shelling and exposives in the Atlantic Ocean 65 nautical miles (120 km) west of the Bishop Rock, Isles of Scilly, United Kingdom (49°39′N 7°51′W) by SM U-62 (Imperial German Navy). Her crew survived.
Alice Charles	France	World War I: The fishing vessel was scuttled in the Bay of Biscay off the Gironde Estuary by SM UC-21 (Imperial German Navy).
HMS Ambient	Royal Navy	World War I: The collier struck a mine placed by SM UC-4 (Imperial German Navy) and sank in the North Sea 7 nautical miles (13 km) north west of the Shipwash Lightship (United Kingdom) (52°08′N 1°46′E). Her crew survived.
Aréthuse	France	World War I: The fishing vessel was scuttled in the Bay of Biscay off the Gironde Estuary by SM UC-21 (Imperial German Navy).
Bilswood	United Kingdom	World War I: The collier struck a mine placed by SM U-73 (Imperial German Navy) and sank in the Mediterranean Sea 8 nautical miles (15 km) off Alexandria, Egypt. Her crew survived.
Collingwood	Norway	World War I: The barque was sunk in the Atlantic Ocean west of the Isles of Scilly (49°13′N 9°39′W) by SM U-62 (Imperial German Navy). Her crew survived.
C.A.S.	United Kingdom	World War I: The fishing smack was scuttled in the Atlantic Ocean 12 nautical miles (22 km) north north west of Trevose Head, Cornwall (50°46′N 5°10′W) by SM UC-47 (Imperial German Navy). Her crew survived.
HMS E49	Royal Navy	World War I: The E-class submarine struck a mine placed by SM UC-76 (Imperial German Navy) and sank off the Shetland Islands with the loss of all 30 crew.
Einar Jarl	Norway	World War I: The cargo ship was sunk in the English Channel 10 nautical miles (19 km) east south east of Start Point, Devon, United Kingdom by SM UC-66 (Imperial German Navy). Her crew survived.
Ena	United Kingdom	World War I: The fishing smack was scuttled in the Atlantic Ocean 10 nautical miles (19 km) north by west of Trevose Head (50°42′N 5°05′W) by SM UC-47 (Imperial German Navy). Her crew survived.
Forget-Me-Not	United Kingdom	World War I: The fishing smack was sunk in the English Channel 12 nautical miles (22 km) south west of Portland Bill, Dorset by SM UC-66 (Imperial German Navy). Her crew survived.
Glynymel	United Kingdom	World War I: The cargo ship was shelled and scuttled in the English Channel 23 nautical miles (43 km) south by west of St. Catherine's Point, Isle of Wight (50°12′N 1°11′W) by SM UC-66 (Imperial German Navy) with the loss of a crew member.
Gratia	United Kingdom	World War I: The fishing smack was scuttled in the Atlantic Ocean 12 nautical miles (22 km) north north west of Trevose Head (50°44′N 5°07′W) by SM UC-47 (Imperial German Navy). Her crew survived.
Guerveur	France	World War I: The barque was shelled and sunk in the Atlantic Ocean 84 nautical miles (156 km) of Tory Island, County Donegal, United Kingdom (55°42′N 10°52′W) by SM U-48 (Imperial German Navy).
Hainaut	Italy	World War I: The cargo ship was sunk by torpedo in the Atlantic Ocean south west of Ireland (52°05′N 11°30′W) by SM U-53 (Imperial German Navy). Her crew survived.
Hyacinth	United Kingdom	World War I: The fishing smack was scuttled in the Atlantic Ocean 15 nautical miles (28 km) north by west of Trevose Head (50°47′N 5°10′W) by SM UC-47 (Imperial German Navy). Her crew survived.
Inter-nos	United Kingdom	World War I: The fishing smack was scuttled in the Atlantic Ocean 12 nautical miles (22 km) north north west of Trevose Head (50°44′N 5°07′W)) by SM UC-47 (Imperial German Navy). Her crew survived.
Jessamine	United Kingdom	World War I: The fishing smack was scuttled in the Atlantic Ocean 14 nautical miles (26 km) north north west of Trevose Head (50°46′N 5°08′W) by SM UC-47 (Imperial German Navy). Her crew survived.
Jules Gommes	France	World War I: The schooner was scuttled in the Atlantic Ocean 60 nautical miles (110 km) west of the Isles of Scilly (49°10′N 8°50′W) by SM U-62 (Imperial German Navy). Her crew survived.
Lent Lily	United Kingdom	World War I: The fishing smack was scuttled in the Atlantic Ocean 13 nautical miles (24 km) north north west of Trevose Head (50°45′N 5°09′W) by SM UC-47 (Imperial German Navy). Her crew survived.
Lucy Anderson	United Kingdom	World War I: The cargo ship was shelled and sunk in the North Sea 55 nautical miles (102 km) east south east of Noss, Wick (58°27′N 1°18′W) by SM UC-44 (Imperial German Navy). Her crew survived.
Marna	Norway	World War I: The coaster was sunk in the North Sea 60 nautical miles (110 km) north east of Kinnaird Head, Aberdeenshire, United Kingdom by SM UC-44 (Imperial German Navy). Her crew survived.
Memnon	United Kingdom	World War I: The cargo ship was sunk by torpedo in the English Channel 20 nautical miles (37 km) south west of Portland Bill (50°15′N 2°48′W) by SM UC-66 (Imperial German Navy) with the loss of six of her crew.
Nellie	United Kingdom	World War I: The fishing smack was scuttled in the Atlantic Ocean 13 nautical miles (24 km) north by west of Trevose Head (50°45′N 5°09′W) by SM UC-47 (Imperial German Navy). Her crew survived.
Nina M.	Italy	World War I: The sailing vessel was sunk in the Mediterranean Sea off Malta (36°27′N 14°33′E) by SM U-64 (Imperial German Navy).
Pontypridd	United Kingdom	World War I: The cargo ship struck a mine placed by SM UC-4 (Imperial German Navy) and sank in the North Sea off Aldeburgh, Suffolk (52°08′N 1°46′E) with the loss of three of her crew.
Proverb	United Kingdom	World War I: The fishing smack was scuttled in the Atlantic Ocean 25 nautical miles (46 km) north west of Trevose Head (50°47′N 5°35′W) by SM UC-47 (Imperial German Navy). Her crew survived.
Reindeer	United Kingdom	World War I: The fishing smack was scuttled in the English Channel 15 nautical miles (28 km) south east of Berry Head, Devon by SM UC-66 (Imperial German Navy). Her crew survived.
Rivina	United Kingdom	World War I: The fishing smack was scuttled in the Atlantic Ocean 15 nautical miles (28 km) north north west of Trevose Head (50°47′N 5°10′W) by SM UC-47 (Imperial German Navy). Her crew survived.
HMS Skate	Royal Navy	World War I: The Admiralty R-class destroyer was torpedoed and damaged in the North Sea off the Maas Lightship (Netherlands) by SM UC-69 (Imperial German Navy) with the loss of a crew member. She was repaired and returned to service.
Tandil	United Kingdom	World War I: The collier was sunk by torpedo in the English Channel 20 nautical miles (37 km) west by north of Portland Bill (49°36′N 2°57′W) by SM UC-68 (Imperial German Navy) with the loss of four of her crew.
Thode Fagelund	Norway	World War I: The cargo ship was sunk in the North Sea off the Noord Hinder Lightship (Netherlands) (51°40′N 2°58′E) by SM UB-27 (Imperial German Navy). Her crew survived.
Topaz	United Kingdom	World War I: The coaster was torpedoed and sunk in the English Channel 27 nautical miles (50 km) east by north of Cape Barfleur, Manche, France (49°50′N 0°40′W) by SM UB-18 (Imperial German Navy) with the loss of three of her crew.

== 13 March ==
List of shipwrecks: 13 March 1917
Ship	State	Description
Alma	Russia	World War I: The schooner was shelled and sunk in the Atlantic Ocean off Wexford, United Kingdom (approximately 51°35′N 7°35′W) by SM U-70 (Imperial German Navy).
Comrades	United Kingdom	World War I: The fishing smack was shelled and sunk in the North Sea off the coast of Norfolk by SM UB-32 (Imperial German Navy). Her crew survived.
Coronda	United Kingdom	World War I: The cargo ship was torpedoed and sunk in the Atlantic Ocean 180 nautical miles (330 km) west of Tory Island, County Donegal (56°11′N 13°40′W) by SM U-81 (Imperial German Navy) with the loss of nine crew.
Dag	Sweden	World War I: The schooner was scuttled in the Atlantic Ocean south of the Fastnet Rock (49°18′N 9°28′W) by SM U-62 (Imperial German Navy). All ten people on board survived.
Demeterton	United Kingdom	World War I: The cargo ship was scuttled in the Atlantic Ocean 730 nautical miles (1,350 km) east by north of Cape Race, Newfoundland by SMS Möwe (Imperial German Navy). Her crew were taken as prisoners of war.
De Tien Kinders	Belgium	World War I: The fishing vessel was sunk in the North Sea off the coast of Norfolk by SM UB-32 (Imperial German Navy).
Elisabeth	French Navy	World War I: The naval trawler struck a mine placed by SM UB-12 (Imperial German Navy) and sank in the English Channel off Calais, Pas-de-Calais (51°01′N 1°52′E).
Elizabeth Eleanor	United Kingdom	World War I: The three-masted schooner was shelled and sunk in the Atlantic Ocean 77 nautical miles (143 km) north west of Trevose Head, Cornwall (50°47′N 6°58′W) by SM U-70 (Imperial German Navy). Her crew survived.
Girda	Norway	World War I: The cargo ship was sunk in the Bay of Biscay off the Île d'Oléron, Charente-Maritime, France by SM UC-21 (Imperial German Navy). Her crew survived.
Gold Seeker	United Kingdom	World War I: The fishing smack was shelled and sunk in the North Sea off the coast of Norfolk by SM UB-32 (Imperial German Navy). Her crew survived.
La Campine	Netherlands	World War I: The tanker was captured and sunk in the North Sea (56°00′N 4°57′E) by SM UC-50 (Imperial German Navy). Her crew survived.
Luciline	United Kingdom	World War I: The tanker was torpedoed and damaged in the Atlantic Ocean off Tearaght Island, County Kerry by SM U-61 (Imperial German Navy). She was beached but was later refloated.
Navenby	United Kingdom	World War I: The trawler was scuttled in the North Sea 85 nautical miles (157 km) east of Rattray Head, Aberdeenshire by SM UC-44 (Imperial German Navy). Her crew survived.
Northwaite	United Kingdom	World War I: The cargo ship was torpedoed and sunk in the Atlantic Ocean off the Blasket Islands, County Kerry (52°11′N 11°07′W) by SM U-61 (Imperial German Navy). Her crew survived.
Norwegian	Norway	World War I: The cargo ship struck a mine placed by SM UC-43 (Imperial German Navy) and sank in the Atlantic Ocean 4 nautical miles (7.4 km) south west of Seven Heads, Clonakilty, County Cork, United Kingdom with the loss of five of her crew.
Pera	Russia	World War I: The full-rigged ship was scuttled in St. George's Channel (50°50′N 7°00′W) by SM U-70 (Imperial German Navy). Her crew survived.
Reward	United Kingdom	The three-masted schooner was shelled and sunk in the English Channel south of Start Point, Cornwall (49°55′N 3°15′W) by SM UC-72 (Imperial German Navy) with the loss of all hands.
Try	United Kingdom	World War I: The fishing smack was shelled and sunk in the Atlantic Ocean 10 nautical miles (19 km) south of the Wolf Rock, Cornwall (49°52′N 5°46′W) by SM UC-66 (Imperial German Navy). Her crew survived.
SM UC-68	Imperial German Navy	The Type UC II submarine was sunk by the detonation of one of her own mines off Start Point, Cornwall, United Kingdom with the loss of all 26 crew.
Vivina	Spain	World War I: The cargo ship was sunk in the Bay of Biscay 12 nautical miles (22 km) off the Île d'Oléron by SM UC-21 (Imperial German Navy). Her crew survived.
HMS Warner	Royal Navy	World War I: The Q-ship was torpedoed and sunk in the Atlantic Ocean south west of Ireland (52°20′N 11°00′W) by SM U-61 (Imperial German Navy) with the loss of eleven crew.

== 14 March ==
List of shipwrecks: 14 March 1917
Ship	State	Description
Aquila	Norway	World War I: The sailing vessel was sunk in the Atlantic Ocean west of the Orkney Islands, United Kingdom by SM U-53 (Imperial German Navy). Her crew survived.
Blåmanden	Norway	World War I: The coaster was shelled and sunk in the Bay of Biscay 3 nautical miles (5.6 km) east of the Île du Pilier, Vendée (47°01′N 2°27′W) by SM UC-21 (Imperial German Navy). Her crew survived.
Bray Head	United Kingdom	World War I: The cargo ship was shelled and sunk in the Atlantic Ocean 375 nautical miles (694 km) north west by west of the Fastnet Rock (52°04′N 18°50′W) by SM U-44 (Imperial German Navy) with the loss of 21 crew.
Brika	United Kingdom	World War I: The cargo ship was torpedoed and sunk in St. George's Channel 13 nautical miles (24 km) south east by south of the Coningbeg Lightship (United Kingdom) by SM UC-47 (Imperial German Navy) with the loss of two of her crew.
Davanger	Norway	World War I: The cargo ship was sunk in the North Sea 40 nautical miles (74 km) west north west of Hook of Holland, South Holland, Netherlands by SM UB-27 (Imperial German Navy). Her crew survived.
Governor	United Kingdom	World War I: The cargo ship was torpedoed and sunk in the Atlantic Ocean 930 nautical miles (1,720 km) west of the Fastnet Rock by SMS Möwe (Imperial German Navy) with the loss of four of her crew. The survivors were taken as prisoners of war.
La Marne	France	World War I: The sailing vessel was sunk in the Bay of Biscay by SM UC-21 (Imperial German Navy).
Orsova	United Kingdom	World War I: The ocean liner struck a mine placed by SM UC-68 (Imperial German Navy) and was damaged in the Atlantic Ocean off the Eddystone Lighthouse with the loss of eight lives. She was beached but was later refloated.
Paignton	United Kingdom	World War I: The cargo ship was shelled and sunk in the Atlantic Ocean 40 nautical miles (74 km) north west of the Skellig Islands, County Kerry (52°01′N 11°29′W) by SM U-81 (Imperial German Navy) with the loss of a crew member.
Rose Lea	United Kingdom	World War I: The collier was torpedoed and sunk in the Atlantic Ocean 230 nautical miles (430 km) west of the Bishop Rock, Isles of Scilly (48°45′N 12°08′W) by SM U-62 (Imperial German Navy). Her crew survived.
Storaas	Norway	World War I: The cargo ship was sunk in the North Sea 160 nautical miles (300 km) southwest of Lista, Vest-Agder (55°30′N 2°55′E) by SM UC-29 (Imperial German Navy). Her crew survived.

== 15 March ==
List of shipwrecks: 15 March 1917
Ship	State	Description
Adieu Va	France	World War I: The sailing vessel was sunk in the English Channel off Cape Barfleur, Manche by SM UB-18 (Imperial German Navy).
Balaguier	France	World War I: The cargo ship was sunk in the Atlantic Ocean 150 nautical miles (280 km) south west of the Bishop Rock, Isles of Scilly, United Kingdom (48°40′N 9°30′W) by SM U-70 (Imperial German Navy).
Circe	France	World War I: The cargo ship was torpedoed and damaged in the Atlantic Ocean 96 nautical miles (178 km) south west of the Bishop Rock (49°10′N 8°50′W) by SM U-70 (Imperial German Navy) with the loss of four crew. She was discovered derelict the next day by Gordonia (United Kingdom), which rescued a survivor. Circe subsequently sank.
Coonagh	United Kingdom	World War I: The cargo ship was sunk in the English Channel off Saint-Valery-en-Caux, Seine-Inférieure, France (49°55′N 0°42′E) by SM UC-16 (Imperial German Navy) with the loss of all ten crew.
Eugene Pergeline	France	World War I: The barque was sunk in the Atlantic Ocean off the Fastnet Rock (51°05′N 9°35′W) by SM U-54 (Imperial German Navy). Her crew survived.
Eugene Robert	France	World War I: The schooner was shelled and sunk in the Bay of Biscay 22 nautical miles (41 km) north west of the Île d'Yeu, Vendée (47°00′N 2°50′W) by SM UC-21 (Imperial German Navy). Her crew survived.
Fleur d'Esperance	France	World War I: The fishing vessel was shelled and sunk in the Bay of Biscay 8 nautical miles (15 km) south of Kerdonis Point, Belle Île, Morbihan by SM UC-21 (Imperial German Navy). Her crew survived.
HMS Foyle	Royal Navy	World War I: The River-class destroyer struck a mine placed by SM UC-68 (Imperial German Navy) in the Strait of Dover, the force of which blew off her bow. Twenty eight of her crew were killed. The stern was towed towards Plymouth but sank off the Mewstone (50°16.70′N 04°10.80′W).
Frimaire	United Kingdom	World War I: The cargo ship was torpedoed and sunk in the Bay of Biscay 21 nautical miles (39 km) south south east of Belle Île (47°03′N 2°26′W) by SM UC-21 (Imperial German Navy) with the loss of twelve of her crew.
Petit Jean	France	World War I: The fishing vessel was sunk in the Bay of Biscay 15 nautical miles (28 km) south of Pointe d'Arzie by SM UC-21 (Imperial German Navy).
Solferino	Norway	World War I: The cargo ship was sunk in the Atlantic Ocean 7 nautical miles (13 km) north of Ouessant, Finistère, France by SM UC-47 (Imperial German Navy). Her crew survived.
Wilfred	Norway	World War I: The cargo ship was sunk in the Atlantic Ocean 18 nautical miles (33 km) north of Ouessant (48°42′N 5°06′W) by SM UC-47 (Imperial German Navy). Her crew survived.

== 16 March ==
List of shipwrecks: 16 March 1917
Ship	State	Description
Anaïs	France	World War I: The schooner was scuttled in the Atlantic Ocean 14 nautical miles (26 km) south east of the Glénan Islands, Finistère by SM UC-21 (Imperial German Navy). Her crew survived.
Bertha	United States	The tugboat, in tow of Chief (United States), broke loose from her tow in a gale ten miles (16 km) off the Aransas Pass Light Station and was lost. Lost with all nine hands.
Catania	Italy	World War I: The passenger ship was sunk in the Mediterranean Sea 15 nautical miles (28 km) off Belvedere Calabro (39°32′N 15°42′E) by SM U-64 (Imperial German Navy) with the loss of 84 crew.
Cordouan	France	World War I: The pilot boat was sunk in the Bay of Biscay off the coast of Gironde by SM UC-70 (Imperial German Navy).
Gudbrand	Norway	World War I: The cargo ship was sunk in the North Sea seven nautical miles (13 km) north east of Blyth, Northumberland, United Kingdom by SM UC-50 (Imperial German Navy). Her crew survived.
Kingswood	United Kingdom	The cargo ship collided with another vessel and sank. Her crew were rescued.
SMS Leopard	Imperial German Navy	A watercolor of the sinking of SMS Leopard. World War I: The armed merchant cruiser was shelled and sunk with the loss of 325 crew in the Norwegian Sea by HMS Achilles and HMS Dundee (both Royal Navy). The vessel sank with all hands plus a six-man Royal Navy boarding party that had boarded the ship.
SMS M24	Imperial German Navy	World War I: The M1-class minesweeper was sunk by mines in the North Sea.
Madeleine Davoust	France	World War I: The schooner was shelled and damaged in the Bay of Biscay six nautical miles (11 km) north west of Penmarc'h, Finistère by SM UC-21 (Imperial German Navy). The attack was broken off due to the arrival of a torpedo boat. Madeleine Davoust was taken in tow but sank at Audierne.
Maggie Belle	United Kingdom	The schooner caught fire and sank in the Atlantic Ocean east of the Azores, Portugal. Her crew were rescued.
Medusa	Italy	World War I: The cargo ship was sunk in the Atlantic Ocean off Ouessant, Finistère by SM UC-47 (Imperial German Navy). Her crew survived.
Narragansett	United Kingdom	World War I: The tanker was torpedoed and sunk in the Atlantic Ocean south west of Ireland (50°12′N 17°34′W) by SM U-44 (Imperial German Navy) with the loss of 46 crew.
Norma Pratt	United Kingdom	World War I: The cargo ship was torpedoed and sunk in the Atlantic Ocean 150 nautical miles (280 km) west of the Bishop Rock, Isles of Scilly (48°53′N 9°53′W) by SM U-70 (Imperial German Navy). Her crew survived, but two of them were taken as prisoners of war.
Pandion	United Kingdom	The cargo ship collided with another vessel and sank. Her crew were rescued.
Pencaer	United Kingdom	World War I: The fishing ketch was scuttled in the Atlantic Ocean nine nautical miles (17 km) south by west of Ram Head, County Cork by SM UC-48 (Imperial German Navy). Her crew survived.
HMT Protect	Royal Navy	The naval trawler was lost on this date.
Ronald	Norway	World War I: The cargo ship was sunk in the Bay of Biscay seven point five nautical miles (13.9 km) south south east of the Penfret Lighthouse, Glénan Islands, Finistère (47°42′N 3°52′W) by SM UC-21 (Imperial German Navy). Her crew survived.
Sir Joseph	United Kingdom	World War I: The ketch was scuttled in the English Channel 30 nautical miles (56 km) south south east of Start Point, Devon by SM UB-18 (Imperial German Navy). Her crew survived.
Sully	France	World War I: The barque was scuttled in the Atlantic Ocean 15 nautical miles (28 km) west of Ouessant by SM UC-47 (Imperial German Navy). Her crew survived.
Vigilancia	United States	World War I: The cargo-liner was sunk in the Atlantic Ocean 145 nautical miles (269 km) west of the Bishop Rock (48°57′N 9°34′W) by SM U-70 (Imperial German Navy) with the loss of fifteen of her crew who were washed overboard and drowned trying to launch the lifeboats.
William Martin	United Kingdom	World War I: The schooner was scuttled in the Atlantic Ocean nine nautical miles (17 km) south by west of Ram Head by SM UC-48 (Imperial German Navy). Her crew survived.

== 17 March ==
List of shipwrecks: 17 March 1917
Ship	State	Description
Alcide Marie	France	World War I: The fishing vessel was sunk in the Bay of Biscay off the coast of Gironde by SM UC-70 (Imperial German Navy).
Antony	United Kingdom	World War I: The passenger ship was torpedoed and sunk in the Irish Sea 19 nautical miles (35 km) west by north of the Coningbeg Lightship (United Kingdom) by SM UC-48 (Imperial German Navy) with the loss of 55 lives.
HMT Caledonia	Royal Navy	World War I: The naval trawler was sunk in the North Sea off Newton-by-the-Sea, Northumberland by SM UC-50 (Imperial German Navy).
Camille Emile	France	World War I: The fishing vessel was sunk in the Bay of Biscay off the coast of Gironde by SM UC-70 (Imperial German Navy).
City of Memphis	United States	World War I: The passenger ship was sunk in the Atlantic Ocean 33 nautical miles (61 km) south of the Fastnet Rock by SM UC-66 (Imperial German Navy). All 57 people on board survived.
Cumberland	United States	While towing a barge out of the harbor at Vinalhaven, Maine, during a gale, the 87-foot (27 m) tug lost power when the towline became entangled in her propeller. She drifted onto a point on Green Island in Penobscot Bay at the entrance to the harbor and broke up on the rocks at 44°01.697′N 068°50.941′W. Her crew survived.
Dieu te Garde	France	World War I: The fishing vessel was sunk in the Bay of Biscay off the coast of Gironde by SM UC-70 (Imperial German Navy).
Expedit	Norway	World War I: The coaster was sunk in the North Sea 15 nautical miles (28 km) east of the Farne Islands, Northumberland (56°04′N 0°04′W) by SM UC-50 (Imperial German Navy). Her crew survived.
HMT Gowan	Royal Navy	World War I: The naval trawler was shelled and sunk in the North Sea 15 nautical miles (28 km) east by south of the Longstone Lighthouse by SM UC-50 (Imperial German Navy). Her crew survived.
Guard	United Kingdom	World War I: The fishing vessel was shelled and sunk in the Irish Sea 8 nautical miles (15 km) south west by west of the Coningbeg Lightship (United Kingdom) by SM UC-48 (Imperial German Navy). Her crew survived.
Juliette	France	World War I: The fishing vessel was sunk in the Bay of Biscay off the coast of Gironde by SM UC-70 (Imperial German Navy).
Kestrel	United Kingdom	World War I: The trawler was shelled and sunk in the North Sea 20 nautical miles (37 km) east by south of the Longstone Lighthouse by SM UC-50 (Imperial German Navy). Her crew survived.
Louis XIV	France	World War I: The fishing vessel was scuttled in the Bay of Biscay 35 nautical miles (65 km) west of the Île de Ré, Charente-Maritime by SM UC-70 (Imperial German Navy).
Marie Louise	France	World War I: The 291-gross register ton schooner was scuttled in the English Channel 35 nautical miles (65 km) east by south of Start Point, Devon, United Kingdom (50°07′N 2°45′W) by SM UB-18 (Imperial German Navy). Her crew survived, they were rescued by Basse Indre (France).
Marie Louise	France	World War I: The 426-gross register ton sailing vessel was scuttled in the English Channel 32 nautical miles (59 km) east south east of Portland Bill, Dorset, United Kingdom (50°14′N 1°44′W) by SM UB-18 (Imperial German Navy). Her crew survived.
HMS Mignonette	Royal Navy	World War I: The Arabis-class sloop-of-war struck a mine placed by SM UC-66 (Imperial German Navy) and sank in the Atlantic Ocean off Galley Head southwest of Ireland with the loss of fourteen of her 79 crew.
Notre Dame du Perpetuel Secours	France	World War I: The fishing vessel was sunk in the Bay of Biscay off the coast of Gironde by SM UC-70 (Imperial German Navy).
Nozal	France	World War I: The fishing vessel was sunk in the Bay of Biscay off the coast of Gironde by SM UC-70 (Imperial German Navy).
HMS Paragon	Royal Navy	World War I: Action of 17 March 1917: The Acasta-class destroyer was torpedoed and sunk in the Strait of Dover while in action with eight torpedo boats (all Imperial German Navy).
Primeira Flor d'Abril	Portugal	World War I: The fishing vessel was scuttled in the Atlantic Ocean 15 nautical miles (28 km) west of Cabo da Roca by SM UC-67 (Imperial German Navy).
Renée Islander	France	World War I: The fishing vessel was sunk in the Bay of Biscay off the coast of Gironde by SM UC-70 (Imperial German Navy).
Restaurador	Portugal	World War I: The fishing vessel was sunk in the Atlantic Ocean 15 nautical miles (28 km) west of Cabo da Roca by SM UC-67 (Imperial German Navy) with the loss of 1 crew.
Rupella	France	World War I: The fishing vessel was sunk in the Bay of Biscay off the coast of Gironde by SM UC-70 (Imperial German Navy).
Russia	Denmark	World War I: The cargo ship was sunk in the English Channel 24 nautical miles (44 km) north by east of Oeussant, Finistère, France (48°50′N 5°08′W) by SM UC-36 (Imperial German Navy) with the loss of four of her crew.
Santa Rita Segunda	Portugal	World War I: The fishing vessel was sunk in the Atlantic Ocean 15 nautical miles (28 km) west of Cabo da Roca by SM UC-67 (Imperial German Navy).
Senhora do Rosario	United Kingdom	World War I: The fishing vessel was sunk in the Atlantic Ocean 15 nautical miles (28 km) west of Cabo da Roca by SM UC-67 (Imperial German Navy).
Tasso	United Kingdom	World War I: the cargo ship struck a mine placed by SM UC-70 (Imperial German Navy) and sank in the Bay of Biscay 5 nautical miles (9.3 km) south of Groix, Morbihan, France with the loss of nineteen of her crew.
Tripoli	Italy	World War I: The coaster was shelled and sunk in the Mediterranean Sea 40 nautical miles (74 km) north of Stromboli (39°22′N 15°17′E) by SM U-64 (Imperial German Navy).

== 18 March ==
List of shipwrecks: 18 March 1917
Ship	State	Description
HMS Alyssum	Royal Navy	World War I: The Arabis-class sloop struck a mine placed by SM UC-66 (Imperial German Navy) and sank in the Atlantic Ocean south west of Galley Head, County Cork (51°31′N 8°57′W). Her crew survived.
HMT Ameer	Royal Navy	World War I: The naval trawler struck a mine placed by SM UC-7 (Imperial German Navy) and sank in the North Sea off Felixstowe, Suffolk (51°58′45″N 1°28′00″E) with the loss of eight of her crew.
HMS Duchess of Montrose	Royal Navy	World War I: The auxiliary minesweeper struck a mine and sank in the North Sea off Gravelines, Pas-de-Calais, France (51°03′N 2°07′E) with the loss of twelve of her crew.
Entente Cordiale	France	World War I: The fishing vessel was scuttled in the Bay of Biscay 18 nautical miles (33 km) south of Les Barges, Vendée by SM UC-70 (Imperial German Navy). Her crew survived.
Félicité Albert	France	World War I: The fishing vessel was scuttled in the Bay of Biscay 10 nautical miles (19 km) south south east of the Île d'Yeu, Vendée (46°30′N 2°14′W) by SM UC-70 (Imperial German Navy). Her crew survived.
Greypoint	United Kingdom	World War I: The coaster was torpedoed and sunk in the English Channel 2 nautical miles (3.7 km) south east by south of Broadstairs, Kent by a Kaiserliche Marine torpedo boat, or 4 destroyers.
Hyacinthe Yvonne	French Navy	World War I: The Q-ship was sunk in the Bay of Biscay off La Pallice, Charente-Maritime by SM UC-70 (Imperial German Navy).
Illinois	United States	World War I: The tanker was scuttled in the English Channel 20 nautical miles (37 km) north of Alderney, Channel Islands by SM UC-21 (Imperial German Navy). Her crew survived.
Joshua Nicholson	United Kingdom	World War I: The cargo ship was torpedoed and sunk in the Atlantic Ocean off Wolf Rock, Cornwall (49°37′N 6°37′W) by SM U-70 (Imperial German Navy) with the loss of 26 crew.
Lowlands	United Kingdom	World War I: The cargo ship struck a mine placed by SM UC-7 (Imperial German Navy) and sank in the North Sea off North Foreland, Kent. Her crew survived.
Madone	France	World War I: The fishing vessel was scuttled in the Bay of Biscay west by south of Les Barges by SM UC-70 (Imperial German Navy). Her crew survived.
Marie Louise	France	World War I: The fishing vessel was sunk in the English Channel 15 nautical miles (28 km) north north west of Cap de la Hève, Manche (49°45′N 0°05′W) by SM UB-18 (Imperial German Navy).
Pola	United Kingdom	World War I: The collier was torpedoed and sunk in the Atlantic Ocean 280 nautical miles (520 km) west north west of Ouessant, Finistère, France (48°30′N 12°00′W) by SM U-81 (Imperial German Navy) with the loss of fiver of her crew.
Trevose	United Kingdom	World War I: The cargo ship was torpedoed and sunk in the Atlantic Ocean 230 nautical miles (430 km) west by north of Ouessant (48°40′N 11°29′W) by SM U-81 (Imperial German Navy). with the loss of two of her crew. Survivors were rescued by Alnwick Castle (United Kingdom).
SM UB-6	Imperial German Navy	World War I: The Type UB I submarine was scuttled at Hellevoetsluis, Zeeland, Netherlands.
Victoria	Sweden	World War I: The cargo ship was sunk in the Atlantic Ocean south west of Spain (36°51′N 8°18′W) by SM UC-67 (Imperial German Navy).

== 19 March ==
List of shipwrecks: 19 March 1917
Ship	State	Description
Alnwick Castle	United Kingdom	World War I: The Union-Castle passenger ship was torpedoed and sunk in the Atlantic Ocean 310 nautical miles (570 km) west of the Bishop Rock, Isles of Scilly (47°38′N 13°24′W) by SM U-81 (Imperial German Navy) with the loss of 40 lives.
Angiolina	Italy	World War I: The cargo ship was torpedoed and damaged in the Mediterranean Sea off Elba (42°41′N 10°36′E) by SM U-34 (Imperial German Navy). She was beached but was later refloated.
Armoricain	France	World War I: The three-masted schooner was shelled and sunk in the English Channel 20 nautical miles (37 km) south west of Dodman Point, Cornwall, United Kingdom(49°53′N 4°43′W) by SM UC-66 (Imperial German Navy). Her crew survived.
Bergsli	Norway	World War I: The cargo ship struck a mine placed by SM UC-70 (Imperial German Navy) and sank in the Bay of Biscay off the Chassiron Lighthouse, Charente-Maritime, France with the loss of four of her crew.
Brode	Norway	World War I: The cargo ship was sunk in the Atlantic Ocean 28 nautical miles (52 km) south south east of Ar Men, Finistère by SM UC-36 (Imperial German Navy) with the loss of a crew member.
Charlois	Netherlands	World War I: The tanker was sunk in the North Sea (57°21′N 4°33′E) by SM U-59 (Imperial German Navy) with the loss of all hands.
Danton	French Navy	Danton sinking. World War I: The Danton-class battleship was torpedoed and sunk in the Mediterranean Sea 30 nautical miles (56 km) off San Pietro Island (38°45′35″N 8°03′30″E) by SM U-64 (Imperial German Navy) with the loss of 296 of her 1,102 crew. Survivors were rescued by the destroyer Massue and various patrol vessels (all French Navy).
Frinton	United Kingdom	World War I: The cargo ship was torpedoed and sunk in the Atlantic Ocean 320 nautical miles (590 km) northwest of Ushant, Finistère, France (approximately 48°N 13°W) by SM U-81 (Imperial German Navy) with the loss of four of her crew.
Kong Inge	Norway	World War I: The coaster was sunk in the Bay of Biscay 4 nautical miles (7.4 km) southwest by west of Brest, France (47°58′N 4°36′W) by SM UC-36 (Imperial German Navy). Her crew survived.
Michel	France	World War I: The cargo ship struck a mine placed by SM UC-70 (Imperial German Navy) and sank in the Bay of Biscay off the Chassiron Lighthouse.
Pollux	Norway	World War I: The cargo ship was sunk in the North Sea 60 nautical miles (110 km) north northeast of Girdleness, Aberdeenshire, United Kingdom (57°55′N 1°10′W) by SM UC-45 (Imperial German Navy) with the loss of sixteen lives.
Rhodora	France	World War I: The fishing vessel was scuttled in the English Channel off Boulogne, Pas-de-Calais (50°24′N 1°19′E) by SM UC-17 (Imperial German Navy). Her crew survived.
HMT Valpa	Royal Navy	World War I: The naval trawler struck a mine placed by SM UC-7 (Imperial German Navy) and sank in the North Sea off Spurn Head, Yorkshire (53°33′30″N 0°10′00″E) with the loss of three of her crew.

== 20 March ==
List of shipwrecks: 20 March 1917
Ship	State	Description
HMHS Asturias	United Kingdom	( Red Cross): World War I: The hospital ship was damaged in the English Channel 6 nautical miles (11 km) off Start Point, Devon by SM UC-66 (Imperial German Navy) with the loss of 35 lives. She was beached and was later salvaged.
Frisk	Norway	World War I: The cargo ship was sunk in the North Sea 85 nautical miles (157 km) north east of Coquet Island, Northumberland, United Kingdom by SM UC-50 (Imperial German Navy) with the loss of seven of her crew.
Gurre	Denmark	World War I: The cargo ship was sunk in the North Sea (58°26′N 1°12′E) by SM U-59 (Imperial German Navy) with the loss of 21 crew.
Hazelpark	United Kingdom	World War I: The cargo ship was torpedoed and sunk in the English Channel 3 nautical miles (5.6 km) south by east of Start Point, Devon by SM UC-66 (Imperial German Navy). Her crew survived.
Maui	United States	The steamer was wrecked at Kahola, Hawaii Territory.
Paul et Marie	France	World War I: The three-masted schooner was shelled and sunk in the Mediterranean Sea north east of Cape Corse, Corsica (43°28′N 9°35′E) by SM U-34 (Imperial German Navy) with the loss of six crew.
Phineas W. Sprague	United States	The schooner was wrecked near Carboneras, Spain.

== 21 March ==
List of shipwrecks: 21 March 1917
Ship	State	Description
Avance	United Kingdom	World War I: The fishing smack was shelled and sunk in the English Channel 25 nautical miles (46 km) west south west of Portland Bill, Dorset by SM UC-66 (Imperial German Navy). Her crew survived.
Healdton	United States	World War I: The Standard Oil Company tanker was torpedoed and sunk by an unknown submarine in the North Sea with the loss of 19, or 21, of her crew. Survivors were rescued by the trawler Java (flag unknown).
Hindustan	United Kingdom	World War I: The cargo ship was torpedoed and sunk in the Atlantic Ocean 150 nautical miles (280 km) north west of the Fastnet Rock (51°25′N 13°30′W) by SM U-46 (Imperial German Navy) with the loss of two crew.
SMS M16	Imperial German Navy	World War I: The M1-class minesweeper was sunk by mines in the North Sea.
SMS M26	Imperial German Navy	World War I: The M1-class minesweeper was sunk by mines in the North Sea.
Najade	Norway	World War I: The full-rigged ship was torpedoed and sunk in the Atlantic Ocean off Fair Isle, United Kingdom (59°35′N 2°17′W) by SM U-59 (Imperial German Navy) with the loss of all 21 crew.
Rio Sorocaba	United Kingdom	World War I: The cargo ship was scuttled in the Atlantic Ocean 10 nautical miles (19 km) south east of the Eddystone Lighthouse (50°04′N 4°13′W) by SM UC-48 (Imperial German Navy). Her crew survived.
Stanley	United Kingdom	World War I: The cargo ship was torpedoed and sunk in the Atlantic Ocean 230 nautical miles (430 km) west by north of the Fastnet Rock (50°50′N 16°00′W) by SM U-24 (Imperial German Navy) with the loss of three crew.
SMS Tsingtau	Imperial German Navy	World War I: The discarded Tsingtau-class river gunboat was scuttled at Canton, China.

== 22 March ==
List of shipwrecks: 22 March 1917
Ship	State	Description
Attika	Norway	World War I: The cargo ship was sunk in the Atlantic Ocean north west of Ireland (54°50′N 12°50′W) by SM U-81 (Imperial German Navy). Her crew survived.
Efeu	Norway	World War I: The sailing vessel was sunk in the English Channel 10 nautical miles (19 km) west south west of Dungeness, Kent, United Kingdom by SM UC-66 (Imperial German Navy). Her crew survived.
Chorley	United Kingdom	World War I: The cargo ship was torpedoed and sunk in the English Channel 25 nautical miles (46 km) east by south of Start Point, Devon (50°14′N 3°02′W) by SM UC-48 (Imperial German Navy). Her crew survived.
Curlew	United Kingdom	World War I: The fishing smack was scuttled in the English Channel 14 nautical miles (26 km) south of Berry Head, Devon by SM UC-17 (Imperial German Navy). Her crew survived.
Egenaes	Norway	World War I: The coaster was sunk in the North Sea 10 nautical miles (19 km) east of Peterhead, Aberdeenshire, United Kingdom by SM UC-45 (Imperial German Navy) with the loss of five of her crew.
Ferro	United States	The 7-gross register ton, 35-foot (10.7 m) motor cargo vessel was lost after she dragged her anchors 0.5 nautical miles (0.9 km; 0.6 mi) west of Middleton Island on the south-central coast of the Territory of Alaska during a gale and went adrift. Her crew of two survived.
Hugin	Norway	World War I: The cargo ship was sunk in the Atlantic Ocean 10 nautical miles (19 km) south of Ar Men, Finistère, France by SM UC-36 (Imperial German Navy). Her crew survived.
Malmanger	Norway	World War I: The tanker struck a mine placed by SM UC-43 (Imperial German Navy) and sank in the Atlantic Ocean 2 nautical miles (3.7 km) south of Baltimore, County Cork, United Kingdom (51°23′N 9°30′W) on her maiden voyage. Her crew survived.
Providence	United Kingdom	World War I: The cargo ship struck a mine placed by SM UC-48 (Imperial German Navy) and sank in St. George's Channel 1.25 nautical miles (2.32 km) south by west of the Barrels Lightship (United Kingdom). Her crew survived.
Rio Colorado	United Kingdom	World War I: The cargo ship struck a mine placed by SM UC-50 (Imperial German Navy) and sank in the North Sea off the mouth of the River Tyne with the loss of ten of her crew.
Rotorua	United Kingdom	World War I: The cargo ship was sunk by torpedo in the English Channel 24 nautical miles (44 km) east of Start Point, Devon (50°17′N 3°07′W) by SM UC-17 (Imperial German Navy) with the loss of a crew member.
Sirius	Norway	World War I: The barque was scuttled in the North Sea (58°40′N 1°50′E) by SM U-57 (Imperial German Navy) with the loss of a crew member.
Stuart Prince	United Kingdom	World War I: The cargo ship was torpedoed and sunk in the Atlantic Ocean 85 nautical miles (157 km) west by north of Broad Haven, County Mayo (55°28′N 11°20′W) by SM U-66 (Imperial German Navy) with the loss of twenty crew.
Susanna	Norway	World War I: The coaster was scuttled in the North Sea 6 nautical miles (11 km) south east by south of Aberdeen (57°04′N 1°54′W) by SM UC-45 (Imperial German Navy). Her crew survived.
Svendsholm	Norway	World War I: The full-rigged ship was shelled and sunk in the Atlantic Ocean west of the Fastnet Rock (50°34′N 15°45′W) by SM U-24 (Imperial German Navy). Her crew survived.

== 23 March ==
List of shipwrecks: 23 March 1917
Ship	State	Description
Achille Adam	United Kingdom	World War I: The coaster was scuttled in the English Channel 31 nautical miles (57 km) south east by east of Beachy Head, Sussex by SM UB-39 (Imperial German Navy) with the loss of six of her crew.
Amstelstroom	Netherlands	World War I: The cargo ship was shelled and damaged in the North Sea by SMS G86, SMS G87 and SMS V44 (all Imperial German Navy). The derelict vessel was sunk on 27 March 20 nautical miles (37 km) east north east of the Noord Hinder Lightship (Netherlands) by SM UB-10 (Imperial German Navy).
Argo	Portugal	World War I: The full-rigged ship was scuttled in the Atlantic Ocean (47°46′N 10°45′W) by SM U-46 (Imperial German Navy).
Artemis	Greece	World War I: The coaster was sunk in the Tyrrhenian Sea off Porto Ercole, Tuscany, Italy (42°22′N 11°22′E) by SM U-34 (Imperial German Navy). Her crew survived.
Bellatrix	Norway	World War I: The cargo ship was sunk in the Tyrrhenian Sea 6 nautical miles (11 km) off Civitavecchia, Lazio, Italy by SM U-34 (Imperial German Navy). Her crew survived.
Blomwaag	Norway	World War I: The coaster was sunk in the North Sea (51°40′N 1°20′E) by SM UC-45 (Imperial German Navy). Her crew survived.
Clan Macmillan	United Kingdom	World War I: The cargo ship was torpedoed and sunk in the English Channel 10 nautical miles (19 km) west of Beachy Head (50°41′N 0°01′W) by SM UB-39 (Imperial German Navy). Her crew survived.
Eptalofos	United Kingdom	World War I: The cargo ship was torpedoed and sunk in the Mediterranean Sea 47 nautical miles (87 km) north west of Malta (36°40′N 13°08′E) by SM U-64 (Imperial German Navy). Her crew survived, but eight survivors were taken as prisoners of war.
Exchange	United Kingdom	World War I: The coaster was shelled and sunk in the English Channel 30 nautical miles (56 km) north west of Cayeux-sur-Mer, Somme, France by SM UB-39 (Imperial German Navy) with the loss of eight crew.
HMS Laforey	Royal Navy	The Laforey-class destroyer struck a British mine and sank in the English Channel off Boulogne, Pas de Calais, France (50°55′N 0°27′E) with the loss of 59 of her 77 crew.
SMS M40	Imperial German Navy	World War I: The Type 1915 minesweeper struck a mine and sank in the North Sea.
Maine	United Kingdom	World War I: The cargo ship was torpedoed and sunk in the English Channel 9.5 nautical miles (17.6 km) south south west of Dartmouth, Devon (50°12′N 3°53′W) by SM UC-17 (Imperial German Navy). Her crew survived.
Noli	Italy	World War I: The cargo ship was sunk in the Tyrrhenian Sea off Civitavecchia (42°11′N 11°37′E) by SM U-34 (Imperial German Navy). Her crew survived.
Prince Rupert	Canada	While leaving Anyox, British Columbia, Canada, during a gale, the passenger ship ran aground on rocks off Genn Island (54.0976°N 130.2916°W). She was refloated, repaired, and returned to service.
Queenborough	United Kingdom	World War I: The trawler was shelled and sunk in the North Sea 106 nautical miles (196 km) east of Peterhead, Aberdeenshire (57°28′N 1°32′E) by SM U-86 (Imperial German Navy). Her nine crew took to the lifeboats but were not rescued.
Tres Fratres	Netherlands	World War I: The trawler was scuttled in the North Sea (57°30′N 6°10′E) by SM U-62 (Imperial German Navy). Her crew survived.

== 24 March ==
List of shipwrecks: 24 March 1917
Ship	State	Description
Alice	United Kingdom	World War I: The fishing smack was scuttled in the Atlantic Ocean 12 nautical miles (22 km) south south west of the Eddystone Lighthouse (49°59′N 4°17′W) by SM UC-17 (Imperial German Navy). Her crew survived.
Boy Walter	United Kingdom	World War I: The fishing smack was scuttled in the Atlantic Ocean 15 nautical miles (28 km) south east of the Eddystone Lighthouse by SM UC-17 (Imperial German Navy). Her crew survived.
Bruyère	France	World War I: The schooner was scuttled in the Irish Sea off South Stack, Anglesey, United Kingdom (53°20′N 5°10′W) by SM UC-65 (Imperial German Navy). Her crew survived.
Emanuela	Italy	World War I: The sailing vessel was sunk in the Malta Channel by SM UC-38 (Imperial German Navy).
Endeavour	United Kingdom	World War I: The fishing smack was scuttled in the Atlantic Ocean 15 nautical miles (28 km) south east of the Eddystone Lighthouse by SM UC-17 (Imperial German Navy). Her crew survived.
Enigma	United Kingdom	World War I: The fishing smack was scuttled in the Atlantic Ocean 15 nautical miles (28 km) south east of the Eddystone Lighthouse by SM UC-17 (Imperial German Navy). Her crew survived.
Ennistown	United Kingdom	World War I: The coaster was scuttled in St. George's Channel 10 nautical miles (19 km) south east of the South Arklow Lightship (United Kingdom) by SM UC-65 (Imperial German Navy). Her crew survived.
Fairearn	United Kingdom	World War I: The coaster was torpedoed and sunk in the Irish Sea 16 nautical miles (30 km) west north west of South Stack by SM UC-65 (Imperial German Navy). Her crew survived.
Fulmar	United Kingdom	World War I: The cargo ship struck a mine placed by SM UC-7 (Imperial German Navy) and sank in the Thames Estuary 8 nautical miles (15 km) south west of the Kentish Knock Lightship (United Kingdom) with the loss of a crew member.
Grenmar	Norway	World War I: The cargo ship was sunk in the North Sea 34 nautical miles (63 km) north by east of St Abb's Head, Berwickshire, United Kingdom by SM UC-77 (Imperial German Navy). Her crew survived.
H.C.G.	United Kingdom	World War I: The fishing smack was scuttled in the Atlantic Ocean 15 nautical miles (28 km) south east of the Eddystone Lighthouse by SM UC-17 (Imperial German Navy). Her crew survived.
Howe	United Kingdom	World War I: The schooner was scuttled in St. George's Channel 4 nautical miles (7.4 km) north east by east of the South Arklow Lightship (United Kingdom) by SM UC-65 (Imperial German Navy). Her crew survived.
Korsnaes	Norway	World War I: The coaster was scuttled in the Irish Sea 3 nautical miles (5.6 km) west south west of Bardsey Island, Pembrokeshire, United Kingdom by SM UC-65 (Imperial German Navy). Her crew survived.
L'Amerique	French Navy	World War I: The naval trawler was torpedoed and sunk in the Ras de Sein by SM UC-36 (Imperial German Navy) with the loss of all 26 hands.
May Flower	United Kingdom	World War I: The fishing smack was scuttled in the Atlantic Ocean 15 nautical miles (28 km) south east of the Eddystone Lighthouse by SM UC-17 (Imperial German Navy). Her crew survived.
Montreal	France	World War I: The cargo ship was torpedoed and damaged in the Atlantic Ocean 77 nautical miles (143 km) off Cape Ortegal, Spain (45°40′N 7°40′W) by SM U-46 (Imperial German Navy) with the loss of 22 crew. She sank on 26 March, One survivor was rescued by a Royal Navy patrol boat.
Qui Vive	United Kingdom	World War I: The fishing smack was scuttled in the Atlantic Ocean 15 nautical miles (28 km) south east of the Eddystone Lighthouse by SM UC-17 (Imperial German Navy). Her crew survived.
Reindeer	United Kingdom	World War I: The fishing smack was scuttled in the Atlantic Ocean 15 nautical miles (28 km) south east of the Eddystone Lighthouse by SM UC-17 (Imperial German Navy). Her crew survived.
Satanita	United Kingdom	World War I: The fishing smack was scuttled in the Atlantic Ocean 12 nautical miles (22 km) south south west of the Eddystone Lighthouse by SM UC-17 (Imperial German Navy). Her crew survived.
Tapir	France	World War I: The tug struck a mine placed by SM UC-70 (Imperial German Navy) and sank in the Bay of Biscay off Groix, Morbihan (47°40′N 3°34′W) with the loss of fifteen of her crew.

== 25 March ==
List of shipwrecks: 25 March 1917
Ship	State	Description
Adenwen	United Kingdom	World War I: The cargo ship was torpedoed and sunk in the Irish Sea 6 nautical miles (11 km) south east by east of the North Arklow Lightship (United Kingdom) by a kaiserliche Marine submarine SM UC-65 with the loss of ten of her crew.
Amerique	French Navy	The naval trawler was lost on this date.
Baynaen	United Kingdom	World War I: The cargo ship was torpedoed and sunk in the Bay of Biscay 20 nautical miles (37 km) north west by west of Belle Île, Morbihan, France (47°34′N 3°40′W) by SM UC-36 (Imperial German Navy) with the loss of five of her crew.
Berbera	United Kingdom	World War I: The cargo ship was torpedoed and sunk in the Mediterranean Sea 60 nautical miles (110 km) east of Catania, Sicily, Italy (37°32′N 15°08′E) by SM U-64 (Imperial German Navy) with the loss of a crew member. Three survivors were taken as prisoners of war.
Brandon	United Kingdom	World War I: The barque was scuttled in the Irish Sea by SM UC-65 (Imperial German Navy). Her four crew took to the lifeboats but were not rescued.
C. Sundt	Norway	World War I: The cargo ship was sunk in the North Sea east of the Shetland Islands, United Kingdom by SM U-81 (Imperial German Navy). Her fifteen crew took to the lifeboats but were not rescued.
Etoile de la Mer	France	World War I: The fishing vessel was sunk in the Seine Estuary by SM UB-40 (Imperial German Navy).
Etoile Polaire	France	World War I: The fishing vessel was sunk in the Bay of Biscay 15 nautical miles (28 km) south west of Groix, Morbihan by SM UC-36 (Imperial German Navy).
HMT Evangel	Royal Navy	World War I: The naval trawler struck a mine placed by SM UC-48 (Imperial German Navy) and sank in the Irish Sea off Milford Haven, Pembrokeshire with the loss of fifteen of her crew.
Felix Faure	France	World War I: The fishing vessel was sunk in the Seine Estuary by SM UB-40 (Imperial German Navy).
Fringante	France	World War I: The schooner was scuttled in the Irish Sea by SM UC-65 (Imperial German Navy). Her crew survived.
Garant	Norway	World War I: The coaster was sunk in the North Sea east of the Shetland Islands by SM U-81 (Imperial German Navy). Her fourteen crew took to the lifeboats but were not rescued.
HMT Hilary II	Royal Navy	World War I: The naval trawler struck a mine placed by SM UC-7 (Imperial German Navy) and sank in the North Sea (51°28′30″N 1°24′00″E) with the loss of eight of her crew.
Huntleys	United Kingdom	World War I: The sailing vessel was scuttled in the English Channel 28 nautical miles (52 km) south south west of Beachy Head, Sussex by SM UC-69 (Imperial German Navy). Her crew survived.
Immacolata	Italy	World War I: The sailing vessel was sunk in the Strait of Messina by SM U-64 (Imperial German Navy).
Industria	United Kingdom	World War I: The trawler was sunk off the coast of Scotland by SM UC-75 (Imperial German Navy) with the loss of all nine crew.
Laly	Norway	World War I: The cargo ship was scuttled in the North Sea east of the Shetland Islands by SM U-81 (Imperial German Navy). Her nineteen crew took to the lifeboats but were not rescued.
Leontine	France	World War I: The brigantine was shelled and sunk in the Bay of Biscay 5 nautical miles (9.3 km) south of Groix by SM UC-36 (Imperial German Navy) with the loss of six of her crew.
Louise	France	World War I: The fishing vessel was sunk in the Seine Estuary by SM UB-40 (Imperial German Navy).
Marie Louise	France	World War I: The fishing vessel was sunk in the English Channel 9 nautical miles (17 km) north north west of Port-en-Bessin, Calvados by SM UB-40 (Imperial German Navy).
Marshall	Norway	World War I: The cargo ship was sunk in the North Sea 17 nautical miles (31 km) east of Peterhead, Aberdeenshire, United Kingdom by SM UC-75 (Imperial German Navy). Her crew survived.
Mary Annie	United Kingdom	World War I: The three-masted schooner was scuttled in the English Channel 28 nautical miles (52 km) south south west of Beachy Head by SM UC-69 (Imperial German Navy). Her crew survived.
Median	United Kingdom	World War I: The trawler was scuttled in the North Sea 30 nautical miles (56 km) east by south of Aberdeen by SM UC-75 (Imperial German Navy). Her crew survived.
Poseidon	Greece	World War I: The cargo ship was sunk in the Irish Sea (52°27′N 5°12′W) by SM UC-65 (Imperial German Navy). Her crew survived.
Prince of Wales	United Kingdom	World War I: The trawler was scuttled in the North Sea 17 nautical miles (31 km) east by south of Girdle Ness, Aberdeenshire (57°10′N 1°32′W) by SM UC-77 (Imperial German Navy). Her crew survived.
Queen Eugenie	United Kingdom	World War I: The cargo ship was torpedoed and sunk in the Mediterranean Sea 23 nautical miles (43 km) north north east of the Cani Rocks, Tunisia (37°57′N 9°47′E) by SM UC-67 (Imperial German Navy) with the loss of 35 of her crew. Two survivors were taken as prisoners of war.
Roslyn	United Kingdom	World War I: The trawler was shelled and sunk in the North Sea 54 nautical miles (100 km) east of Girdle Ness, Aberdeenshire by SM UC-75 (Imperial German Navy). Her crew survived.
Saint Joseph	France	World War I: The fishing vessel was sunk in the Seine Estuary by SM UB-40 (Imperial German Navy).
Vellore	United Kingdom	World War I: The collier was torpedoed and sunk in the Mediterranean Sea 21 nautical miles (39 km) north west by north of Alexandria, Egypt by SM U-63 (Imperial German Navy). Her crew survived, but two were taken as prisoners of war.

== 26 March ==
List of shipwrecks: 26 March 1917
Ship	State	Description
Ceres	Germany	The cargo ship ran aground off Terschelling, Friesland, Netherlands. She was declared a total loss on 4 April.
Cerne	United Kingdom	World War I: The cargo ship struck a mine placed by SM UC-7 (Imperial German Navy) and sank in the Thames Estuary. Her crew survived.
Ledbury	United Kingdom	World War I: The cargo ship was torpedoed and sunk in the Mediterranean Sea 90 nautical miles (170 km) north by east of Benghazi, Libya by SM UB-43 (Imperial German Navy) with the loss of three of her crew.
L. Rahmanich	Egypt	World War I: The sailing vessel was sunk in the Mediterranean Sea between Alexandria and Port Said by SM U-63 (Imperial German Navy).
HMS Myrmidon	Royal Navy	The Myrmidon-class destroyer collided with Hamborn (United Kingdom) and sank in the English Channel off Dungeness, Kent with the loss of a crew member. Survivors were rescued by Tambour (United Kingdom) and the destroyer HMS Mermaid (Royal Navy).
Norma	Sweden	World War I: The cargo ship was sunk in the English Channel 9 nautical miles (17 km) north of Île Vierge by SM UC-69 (Imperial German Navy). Her crew survived.

== 27 March ==
List of shipwrecks: 27 March 1917
Ship	State	Description
Aasta	Norway	World War I: The cargo ship was sunk in the Atlantic Ocean 3 nautical miles (5.6 km) south west of Ar Men, Finistère, France by SM UC-69 (Imperial German Navy). Her crew survived.
Don Benito	United Kingdom	The collier collided with Ultonia (United Kingdom) and sank in the Atlantic Ocean (49°35′N 6°44′W).
Galatia	United Kingdom	World War I: The fishing vessel was scuttled in the North Sea 30 nautical miles (56 km) south south west of Buchan Ness, Aberdeenshire by SM UC-77 (Imperial German Navy). Her crew survived.
Glenogle	United Kingdom	World War I: The cargo ship was torpedoed and sunk in the Atlantic Ocean 207 nautical miles (383 km) south west of the Fastnet Rock (48°20′N 12°00′W) by SM U-24 (Imperial German Navy). Her crew survived.
Grib	Norway	World War I: The cargo ship was sunk in the Atlantic Ocean 7 nautical miles (13 km) west of Ar Men by SM UC-69 (Imperial German Navy). Her crew survived.
Holgate	United Kingdom	World War I: The cargo ship was torpedoed and sunk in the Atlantic Ocean 10 nautical miles (19 km) north west of the Skellig Islands, County Kerry by SM U-57 (Imperial German Navy). Her crew survived.
Kelvinhead	United Kingdom	World War I: The cargo ship struck a mine placed by SM UC-65 (Imperial German Navy) and sank in Liverpool Bay 0.75 nautical miles (1.39 km) west south west of the Liverpool Bar Lightship. Her crew survived.
Neath	United Kingdom	World War I: The auxiliary barque was sunk by torpedo in the Atlantic Ocean 28 nautical miles (52 km) south by east of the Fastnet Rock by SM U-66 (Imperial German Navy). Her crew survived, but her captain was taken as a prisoner of war.
Nova	Norway	World War I: The cargo ship was sunk in the North Sea 18 nautical miles (33 km) off Girdle Ness by SM UC-77 (Imperial German Navy). Her crew survived.
Sandvik	Norway	World War I: The coaster was sunk in the North Sea 7 nautical miles (13 km) off Tod Head, Aberdeenshire by SM UC-77 (Imperial German Navy). Her crew survived.
Thracia	United Kingdom	World War I: The cargo ship was torpedoed and sunk in the Bay of Biscay 12 nautical miles (22 km) north of Belle Île, Morbihan, France (47°31′N 3°17′W) by SM UC-69 (Imperial German Navy) with the loss of 36 of her crew.
62	French Navy	World War I: The gunboat was sunk in the Mediterranean Sea west of Bizerte, Algeria by SM UC-37 (Imperial German Navy).

== 28 March ==
List of shipwrecks: 28 March 1917
Ship	State	Description
Antonietta R.	Italy	World War I: The sailing vessel was sunk in the Tyrrhenian Sea off Capo Palinuro, Calabria by SM U-34 (Imperial German Navy).
Ardglass	United Kingdom	World War I: The coaster was scuttled in the Irish Sea 4 nautical miles (7.4 km) east of the South Arklow Lightship (United Kingdom) (52°14′N 5°51′W) by SM UC-65 (Imperial German Navy). Her crew survived.
Brise	French Navy	The naval trawler was lost on this date.
Cannizaro	United Kingdom	World War I: The cargo ship was torpedoed and sunk in the Atlantic Ocean 145 nautical miles (269 km) south west of the Fastnet Rock (49°00′N 10°00′W) by SM U-24 (Imperial German Navy). Her crew survived.
Carlo T	Italy	World War I: The sailing vessel was sunk in the Tyrrhenian Sea off Capo Palinuro by SM U-34 (Imperial German Navy).
Dagali	Norway	World War I: The coaster was sunk in the Irish Sea 5 nautical miles (9.3 km) north east of the South Arklow Lightship (United Kingdom) by SM UC-65 (Imperial German Navy). Her crew survived.
Expedient	United Kingdom	World War I: The trawler was scuttled in the North Sea by SM UC-75 (Imperial German Navy) with the loss of all nine crew.
Gafsa	United Kingdom	World War I: The tanker was torpedoed and sunk in the Atlantic Ocean 10 nautical miles (19 km) south east of the Old Head of Kinsale, County Cork by SM U-57 (Imperial German Navy) with the loss of seven crew.
Giuseppina	Italy	World War I: The sailing vessel was sunk in the Tyrrhenian Sea off Capo Palinuro by SM U-34 (Imperial German Navy).
Giuseppina Rosa	Italy	World War I: The brigantine was scuttled in the Tyrrhenian Sea by SM U-34 (Imperial German Navy).
Guillemot	United Kingdom	World War I: The lightship was scuttled in the Irish Sea 1.5 nautical miles (2.8 km) west of Hook Point, County Waterford by SM UC-65 (Imperial German Navy). Her crew survived.
Harvest Home	Isle of Man	World War I: The schooner was shelled and sunk in the Irish Sea 4 nautical miles (7.4 km) north east of the South Arklow Lightship (United Kingdom) by SM UC-65 (Imperial German Navy). Her crew survived.
Hero	United Kingdom	World War I: The tug struck a mine placed by SM UC-40 (Imperial German Navy) and sank in the North Sea off the mouth of the River Wear with the loss of a crew member.
Katina	Greece	World War I: The cargo ship was torpedoed and sunk in the Bay of Biscay 10 nautical miles (19 km) north west of the Île d'Yeu, Vendée, France (46°47′N 2°28′W) by SM UC-69 (Imperial German Navy). Her crew survived.
Laima	Russia	World War I: The schooner was sunk in the Irish Sea 10 nautical miles (19 km) south east of the Codling Lightship by SM UC-65 (Imperial German Navy).
La Maria	Italy	World War I: The sailing vessel was sunk in the Tyrrhenian Sea by SM U-34 (Imperial German Navy).
Moulmein	United Kingdom	World War I: The 100.7-foot (30.7 m), 151-ton steam trawler was captured and scuttled by opening her seacocks in the North Sea 25 nautical miles (46 km) north east of the Longstone Lighthouse, Northumberland (56°00′N 1°13′W) by SM UC-77 (Imperial German Navy). Her crew survived.
Oakwell	United Kingdom	World War I: The coaster was torpedoed and sunk in the North Sea 3 nautical miles (5.6 km) north east of Robin Hood's Bay, Yorkshire by SM UB-22 (Imperial German Navy) with the loss of four crew.
Pietro Lofaro	Italy	World War I: The sailing vessel was sunk in the Tyrrhenian Sea off Capo Palinuro by SM U-34 (Imperial German Navy).
Raffaele	Italy	World War I: The sailing vessel was sunk in the Tyrrhenian Sea off Capo Palinuro by SM U-34 (Imperial German Navy).
Ruby	United Kingdom	World War I: The coaster struck a mine placed by SM UC-42 (Imperial German Navy) and sank in the North Sea 2.5 nautical miles (4.6 km) off Auskerry Orkney Islands with the loss of six of her crew.
Snowdon Ranger	United Kingdom	World War I: The cargo ship was torpedoed and sunk in St. George's Channel 25 nautical miles (46 km) west of Bardsey Island, Pembrokeshire (52°36′N 5°34′W) by SM UC-65 (Imperial German Navy) with the loss of four of her crew.
Tizona	Norway	World War I: The cargo ship was sunk in the North sea 34 nautical miles (63 km) north by east of the Longstone Lighthouse by SM UC-77 (Imperial German Navy). Her crew survived.
Urania	Norway	World War I: The barque was sunk in the North Sea 12 nautical miles (22 km) east of Copinsay, Orkney Islands by SM UC-42 (Imperial German Navy) with the loss of seven of her crew.
Wychwood	United Kingdom	World War I: The collier was torpedoed and sunk in the Irish Sea 4 nautical miles (7.4 km) south south west of the South Arklow Lightship (United Kingdom) (52°40′N 5°55′W) by SM UC-65 (Imperial German Navy) with the loss of three of her crew.

== 29 March ==
List of shipwrecks: 29 March 1917
Ship	State	Description
Bismarck	Imperial German Navy	The Vorpostenboot was lost on this date.
Bywell	United Kingdom	World War I: The cargo ship was torpedoed and sunk in the North Sea 3 nautical miles (5.6 km) east of Scarborough, Yorkshire (54°17′N 0°18′W) by SM UB-21 (Imperial German Navy). Her crew survived.
Conoid	United Kingdom	World War I: The schooner was shelled and sunk in the English Channel 3.5 nautical miles (6.5 km) north of the Barfleur Lighthouse, Manche, France by SM UB-40 (Imperial German Navy). Her crew survived.
Crispin	United Kingdom	World War I: World War I: The cargo liner was torpedoed and sunk in the Atlantic Ocean 14 nautical miles (26 km) south of Hook Point, Waterford by SM U-57 (Imperial German Navy) with the loss of eight crew.
Irma	France	World War I: The sailing vessel was sunk in the English Channel off Cap Barfleur, Manche by SM UB-40 (Imperial German Navy). Her crew survived.
Kathleen Lily	United Kingdom	World War I: The coaster was sunk in the North Sea 2 nautical miles (3.7 km) east of Robin Hood's Bay, Yorkshire (54°27′N 0°28′W) by SM UC-30 (Imperial German Navy) with the loss of four of her crew.
Lincolnshire	United Kingdom	World War I: The cargo ship was torpedoed and sunk in the Atlantic Ocean 8 nautical miles (15 km) south west by south of Hook Point (52°00′N 7°00′W) by SM U-57 (Imperial German Navy). Her crew survived.
Mascota	United Kingdom	World War I: The coaster was torpedoed and sunk in the North Sea 8 nautical miles (15 km) east of Lowestoft, Suffolk by a Kaiserliche Marine torpedo boat with the loss of seven of her fourteen crew. Survivors were taken as prisoners of war.
Morild I	Norway	World War I: The cargo ship was scuttled in the Bay of Biscay 3 nautical miles (5.6 km) off Hourtin, Gironde, France by SM UC-69 (Imperial German Navy). Her crew survived.
Os	Norway	World War I: The coaster was sunk in the Atlantic Ocean 2 nautical miles (3.7 km) north west by north of Noup Head, Orkney Islands, United Kingdom by SM U-60 (Imperial German Navy). Her crew survived.
Schaldis	Belgium	The cargo ship was torpedoed and sunk in the North Sea 6 nautical miles (11 km) north north east of Whitby, Yorkshire, United Kingdom by SM UC-75 (Imperial German Navy).

== 30 March ==
List of shipwrecks: 30 March 1917
Ship	State	Description
Avanguardia	Italy	World War I: The cargo ship was scuttled in the Bay of Biscay 15 nautical miles (28 km) off the Contis les Bains Lighthouse, Pyrenées-Atlantiques by SM UC-69 (Imperial German Navy). Her crew survived.
Britta	Norway	World War I: The cargo ship was scuttled in the Bay of Biscay 14 nautical miles (26 km) north of the Contis les Bains Lighthouse by SM UC-69 (Imperial German Navy). Her crew survived.
HMT Christopher	Royal Navy	World War I: The naval trawler struck a mine placed by SM UC-14 (Imperial German Navy) and sank in the North Sea off Southwold, Suffolk (52°26′N 1°48′E) with the loss of five of her crew.
Dee	United Kingdom	World War I: The sailing vessel was scuttled in the Pacific Ocean 410 nautical miles (760 km) west by south of Cape Leeuwin, Western Australia by SMS Wolf (Imperial German Navy).
Endymion	United Kingdom	World War I: The sailing vessel was sunk in the English Channel by a submarine (Imperial German Navy) with the loss of four of her crew.
Harberton	United Kingdom	World War I: The cargo ship struck a mine placed by SM UC-31 (Imperial German Navy) and sank in the North Sea with the loss of fifteen of her crew.
M15	Imperial German Navy	World War I: The M1-class minesweeper was sunk by mines in the North Sea.
Michelina Catalano	Italy	World War I: The sailing vessel was sunk in the Mediterranean Sea north of Sicily by SM U-52 (Imperial German Navy).
Petrel	United Kingdom	World War I: The trawler was scuttled in the North Sea 120 nautical miles (220 km) east of Aberdeen (57°00′N 1°30′E) by SM UC-77 (Imperial German Navy). Her crew survived.
Saint Louis III	French Navy	World War I: The naval trawler struck a mine placed by SM UC-71 (Imperial German Navy) and sank off Saint Valery with the loss of sixteen of her crew.
Sarcelle	France	World War I: The sailing vessel struck a mine placed by SM UC-71 (Imperial German Navy) and sank in the English Channel off Dieppe, Seine-Inférieure.
Somme	United Kingdom	World War I: The cargo ship was torpedoed and sunk in the English Channel 20 nautical miles (37 km) east by north of Cap Barfleur, Manche, France (49°48′N 0°41′W) by SM UB-40 (Imperial German Navy) with the loss of five of her crew.

== 31 March ==
List of shipwrecks: 31 March 1917
Ship	State	Description
Allentown	United States	The schooner barge was sunk in a collision with Coamo (flag unknown) off Sandy Hook, New Jersey, a total loss.
Boaz	United Kingdom	World War I: The ketch was scuttled in the English Channel 15 nautical miles (28 km) north of Cap Barfleur, Manche, France by SM UB-32 (Imperial German Navy). Her crew survived.
Braefield	United Kingdom	World War I: The coaster was sunk in St. George's Channel off Milford Haven, Pembrokeshire by SM U-57 (Imperial German Navy) with the loss of all ten crew.
Brodness	United Kingdom	World War I: The Blue Star Line refrigerated cargo ship was torpedoed and sunk in the Tyrrhenian Sea 5 nautical miles (9.3 km) west north west of Anzio, Lazio, Italy (41°28′N 12°26′E) by SM UC-38 (Imperial German Navy). Her crew survived.
Dee	United Kingdom	World War I: The barque was sunk 400 miles (640 km) south west of Cape Leeuwin, Australia in the Indian Ocean by SMS Wolf (Imperial German Navy).
Farmand	Norway	World War I: The cargo ship was sunk in the Bay of Biscay 6 nautical miles (11 km) north of Punta Galea, Biscay, Spain by SM UC-69 (Imperial German Navy). Her crew survived.
HMT Forward III	Royal Navy	World War I: The naval trawler struck a mine placed by SM UC-6 (Imperial German Navy) and sank in the North Sea south of the Shipwash Lightship (United Kingdom) (51°57′30″N 1°48′30″E) with the loss of ten of her crew.
Galatee	France	World War I: The cargo ship was torpedoed and damaged in the Mediterranean Sea east of Cape Corbelin, Algeria (36°53′N 5°01′E) by SM UC-37 (Imperial German Navy). She was beached at Sidi Kralem but was later refloated.
Gippeswic	United Kingdom	World War I: The ketch was scuttled in the English Channel 15 nautical miles (28 km) north of Barfleur, Manche by SM UB-32 (Imperial German Navy). Her crew survived.
HMHS Gloucester Castle	Royal Navy	HMHS Gloucester Castle ( Red Cross): World War I: The hospital ship was torpedoed and damaged in the English Channel off the Isle of Wight by SM UB-32 (Imperial German Navy) with the loss of three crew. She was subsequently repaired and returned to service.
Hestia	Netherlands	World War I: The tanker was sunk in the North Sea 31 nautical miles (57 km) west of the Maas Lightship (Netherlands) by SM UB-23 (Imperial German Navy).
Lisbeth	Norway	World War I: The cargo ship was sunk in the North Sea north east of the Noord Hinder Lightship (Netherlands) by SM UB-23 (Imperial German Navy). Her crew survived.
Primrose	United Kingdom	World War I: The schooner was shelled and sunk in the English Channel 35 nautical miles (65 km) south west of Start Point, Devon by SM UC-71 (Imperial German Navy) with the loss of a crew member.

== Unknown date ==
List of shipwrecks: Unknown date 1917
Ship	State	Description
Acton	United Kingdom	World War I: The cargo ship was sunk in the English Channel by an Imperial German Navy submarine.
Emeline	United States	The laid up, out of commission passenger steamer was crushed by ice and sunk in the Hudson River.
T-18	Russian Navy	The T-13-class minesweeper was wrecked in Kola Bay.
Tangier	United States	The barge sank at the entrance to the York River, in Chesapeake Bay on 31 March 1917 or 19 September 1916.
SM U-85	Imperial German Navy	The Type U 81 submarine foundered in the North Sea with the loss of all 38 crew after 7 March.
