= SS Catania =

SS Catania is the name of the following ships:

- SS Catania (1894), renamed SS Ausonia in 1904, sunk in 1917
- SS Catania (1906), sunk by SM U-64 on 16 March 1917
- SS Catania (1918), launched in 1918 as Cokesit, renamed Catania in 1942, scuttled in 1943
