= UC-43 =

UC-43 may refer to:

- SM UC-43, German minelaying submarine of WWI
- UC-43, Military designation for the Beechcraft Model 17 aircraft
