= HMS Pheasant (1916) =

Destroyer of the Royal Navy

Coordinates: 58°52.07′N 3°27.41′W

History

United Kingdom
- Name: Pheasant
- Ordered: May 1915
- Builder: Fairfield Shipbuilding and Engineering Company, Govan, Glasgow
- Launched: 23 October 1916
- Commissioned: December 1916
- Fate: Sunk by naval mine, 1 March 1917

General characteristics
- Class & type: Admiralty M-class destroyer
- Displacement: 972 long tons (988 t) (normal)
- Length: 273 ft 4 in (83.3 m) (o/a)
- Beam: 26 ft 8 in (8.1 m)
- Draught: 8 ft 6 in (2.6 m)
- Installed power: 3 Yarrow boilers; 25,000 shp (18,642 kW)
- Propulsion: 3 shafts; 1 steam turbine set
- Speed: 34 knots (63 km/h; 39 mph)
- Range: 2,100 nmi (3,900 km; 2,400 mi) at 15 knots (28 km/h; 17 mph)
- Complement: 76
- Armament: 3 × 4 in (102 mm) guns; 1 × single 2-pdr (40 mm (1.6 in)) guns; 2 × twin 21 in (533 mm) torpedo tubes

HMS Pheasant was one of 85 Admiralty M-class destroyers built during the First World War for the Royal Navy. She hit and was sunk by a mine in 1917.

== Description ==
The Admiralty M class were improved and faster versions of the preceding Laforey-class destroyer. They displaced 972 long tons (988 t). The ships had an overall length of 273 feet 4 inches (83.3 m), a beam of 26 feet 8 inches (8.1 m) and a draught of 8 feet 6 inches (2.6 m). Pheasant was powered by a single Brown-Curtis direct-drive steam turbine turning three propeller shafts, using steam provided by three Yarrow boilers. The turbines developed a total of 25,000 shaft horsepower (19,000 kW) and gave a maximum speed of 34 knots (63 km/h; 39 mph). The ships carried a maximum of 228 long tons (232 t) of fuel oil that gave them a range of 2,100 nautical miles (3,900 km; 2,400 mi) at 15 knots (28 km/h; 17 mph). The ships' complement was 76 officers and ratings.

The ships were armed with three single QF 4-inch (102 mm) Mark IV guns and a QF 2-pounder (40 mm (1.6 in)) "pom-pom" anti-aircraft gun. They were also fitted with two above-water twin mounts for 21-inch (533 mm) torpedoes.

== Construction and career ==
Pheasant was ordered as part of the 5th War Emergency Programme in May 1915. She was built by Fairfield Shipbuilding and Engineering Company at its shipyard in Govan on the Clyde and launched on 23 October 1916. Completed in December, she was assigned to the Grand Fleet, joining the 15th Destroyer Flotilla.

On the morning of 1 March 1917 the destroyer, together with a number of armed trawlers, was taking part in a routine patrol of the Western entrance to Scapa Flow, the Grand Fleet's anchorage in Orkney. Pheasant was off Hoy when the trawlers observed a large explosion, due to Partridge striking a mine. The destroyer sank with the loss of 89 lives. The sinking has variously attributed to a drifting mine from a field laid by the German armed merchant cruiser Möwe in 1915–1916, a mine laid by the submarine U-80 in January 1917, or one laid by UC-43. Only one body and a small amount of debris was recovered by the trawlers.

The wreck lies roughly E-W, in 82 metres (269 ft) of water at and was found by divers from the Army Sub-Aqua Club on 13 May 1996.

== Bibliography ==
- Colledge, J. J.; Warlow, Ben (2006) [1969]. Ships of the Royal Navy: The Complete Record of All Fighting Ships of the Royal Navy from the 15th Century to the Present (3rd Rev ed.). London: Chatham Publishing. ISBN 978-1-86176-281-8. OCLC 67375475.
- Friedman, Norman (2009). British Destroyers: From Earliest Days to the Second World War. Barnsley, UK: Seaforth Publishing. ISBN 978-1-84832-049-9.
- Gardiner, Robert & Gray, Randal, eds. (1985). Conway's All The World's Fighting Ships 1906–1921. London: Conway Maritime Press. ISBN 0-85177-245-5.
- March, Edgar J. (1966). British Destroyers: A History of Development, 1892–1953; Drawn by Admiralty Permission From Official Records & Returns, Ships' Covers & Building Plans. London: Seeley Service. OCLC 164893555.
- Monograph No. 34: Home Waters Part VIII: December 1916 to April 1917 (PDF). Naval Staff Monographs (Historical). Vol. XVIII. Naval Staff, Training and Staff Duties Division. 1933.
