= UC-45 =

UC-45 may refer to:

- SM UC-45, a World War I German coastal minelaying submarine
- Beechcraft Model 18, an airplane with a United States military designation of "UC-45"
