= SM UC-36 =

German Type UC II minelaying U-boat

History

German Empire
- Name: UC-36
- Ordered: 20 November 1915
- Builder: Blohm & Voss, Hamburg
- Yard number: 277
- Launched: 5 June 1916
- Commissioned: 10 October 1916
- Fate: Rammed and sunk, 21 May 1917

General characteristics
- Class & type: Type UC II submarine
- Displacement: 427 t (420 long tons), surfaced; 509 t (501 long tons), submerged
- Length: 50.35 m (165 ft 2 in) o/a; 40.30 m (132 ft 3 in) pressure hull
- Beam: 5.22 m (17 ft 2 in) o/a; 3.65 m (12 ft) pressure hull
- Draught: 3.65 m (12 ft)
- Propulsion: 2 × propeller shafts; 2 × 6-cylinder, 4-stroke diesel engines, 600 PS (440 kW; 590 shp); 2 × electric motors, 460 PS (340 kW; 450 shp)
- Speed: 11.6 knots (21.5 km/h; 13.3 mph), surfaced; 6.8 knots (12.6 km/h; 7.8 mph), submerged
- Range: 10,180 nmi (18,850 km; 11,710 mi) at 7 knots (13 km/h; 8.1 mph) surfaced; 54 nmi (100 km; 62 mi) at 4 knots (7.4 km/h; 4.6 mph) submerged
- Test depth: 50 m (160 ft)
- Complement: 26
- Armament: 6 × 100 cm (39.4 in) mine tubes; 18 × UC 200 mines; 3 × 50 cm (19.7 in) torpedo tubes (2 bow/external; one stern); 7 × torpedoes; 1 × 8.8 cm (3.5 in) Uk L/30 deck gun
- Notes: 35-second diving time

Service record
- Part of: Flandern Flotilla; 3 February – 21 May 1917
- Commanders: Oblt.z.S. / Kptlt. Gustav Buch; 3 November 1916 – 21 May 1917
- Operations: 5 patrols
- Victories: 22 merchant ships sunk (36,707 GRT); 2 auxiliary warships sunk (660 GRT)

SM UC-36 was a German Type UC II minelaying submarine or U-boat in the German Imperial Navy (German: Kaiserliche Marine) during World War I. The U-boat was ordered on 20 November 1915 and was launched on 5 June 1916. She was commissioned into the German Imperial Navy on 10 October 1916 as SM UC-36. (Note: "SM" stands for "Seiner Majestät" (English: His Majesty's) and combined with the U for Unterseeboot would be translated as His Majesty's Submarine.) In five patrols UC-36 was credited with sinking 24 ships, either by torpedo or by mines laid. UC-36 was rammed and sunk by the French steamer Molière off Ushant on 21 May 1917.

== Design ==
A Type UC II submarine, UC-36 had a displacement of 427 tonnes (420 long tons) when at the surface and 509 tonnes (501 long tons) while submerged. She had a length overall of 50.35 m (165 ft 2 in), a beam of 5.22 m (17 ft 2 in), and a draught of 3.65 m (12 ft). The submarine was powered by two six-cylinder four-stroke diesel engines each producing 300 metric horsepower (220 kW; 300 shp) (a total of 600 metric horsepower (440 kW; 590 shp)), two electric motors producing 460 metric horsepower (340 kW; 450 shp), and two propeller shafts. She had a dive time of 35 seconds and was capable of operating at a depth of 50 metres (160 ft).

The submarine had a maximum surface speed of 11.6 knots (21.5 km/h; 13.3 mph) and a submerged speed of 6.8 knots (12.6 km/h; 7.8 mph). When submerged, she could operate for 54 nautical miles (100 km; 62 mi) at 4 knots (7.4 km/h; 4.6 mph); when surfaced, she could travel 10,180 nautical miles (18,850 km; 11,710 mi) at 7 knots (13 km/h; 8.1 mph). UC-36 was fitted with six 100 centimetres (39 in) mine tubes, eighteen UC 200 mines, three 50 centimetres (20 in) torpedo tubes (one on the stern and two on the bow), seven torpedoes, and one 8.8 cm (3.5 in) Uk L/30 deck gun. Her complement was twenty-six crew members.

== Summary of raiding history ==
Date	Name	Nationality	Tonnage (Note: Merchant ship tonnages are in gross register tons. Military vessels are listed by tons displacement.)	Fate
12 February 1917	West	Norway	378	Sunk
17 March 1917	Russia	Denmark	1,617	Sunk
19 March 1917	Kong Inge	Norway	867	Sunk
19 March 1917	Brode	Norway	2,363	Sunk
22 March 1917	Hugin	Norway	1,395	Sunk
24 March 1917	L’amerique	French Navy	489	Sunk
25 March 1917	Baynaen	United Kingdom	3,227	Sunk
25 March 1917	Etoile Polaire	France	33	Sunk
25 March 1917	Leontine	France	201	Sunk
23 April 1917	Savio	Kingdom of Italy	1,922	Sunk
24 April 1917	Kenilworth	United Kingdom	2,735	Sunk
24 April 1917	La Providence	France	272	Sunk
25 April 1917	Hirondelle	United Kingdom	1,648	Sunk
27 April 1917	Verjø	Norway	1,002	Sunk
28 April 1917	Condor	Russian Empire	3,565	Sunk
18 May 1917	Camberwell	United Kingdom	4,078	Sunk
18 May 1917	Elford	United Kingdom	1,739	Sunk
18 May 1917	HMT Lucknow	Royal Navy	171	Sunk
20 May 1917	Dana	United Kingdom	182	Sunk
20 May 1917	Mientje	United Kingdom	120	Sunk
20 May 1917	Tijuca	Brazil	2,304	Sunk
21 May 1917	Ferdinand A.	France	2,062	Sunk
30 May 1917	Corbet Woodall	United Kingdom	917	Sunk
14 June 1917	Nirefs	Greece	4,080	Sunk
