= SM UC-77 =

German Type UC II minelaying U-boat

History

German Empire
- Name: UC-77
- Ordered: 12 January 1916
- Builder: AG Vulcan, Hamburg
- Yard number: 82
- Launched: 2 December 1916
- Commissioned: 29 December 1916
- Fate: Sunk by mine, 11 July 1918

General characteristics
- Class & type: Type UC II submarine
- Displacement: 410 t (400 long tons), surfaced; 493 t (485 long tons), submerged
- Length: 50.45 m (165 ft 6 in) o/a; 40.30 m (132 ft 3 in) pressure hull
- Beam: 5.22 m (17 ft 2 in) o/a; 3.65 m (12 ft) pressure hull
- Draught: 3.65 m (12 ft)
- Propulsion: 2 × propeller shafts; 2 × 6-cylinder, 4-stroke diesel engines, 580–600 PS (430–440 kW; 570–590 shp); 2 × electric motors, 620 PS (460 kW; 610 shp)
- Speed: 11.8 knots (21.9 km/h; 13.6 mph), surfaced; 7.3 knots (13.5 km/h; 8.4 mph), submerged
- Range: 8,660 nautical miles at 7 knots (13 km/h; 8.1 mph), surfaced; (16,040 km at 13 km/h); 52 nautical miles at 4 knots (7.4 km/h; 4.6 mph), submerged; (96 km at 7.4 km/h)
- Test depth: 50 m (160 ft)
- Complement: 26
- Armament: 6 × 100 cm (39.4 in) mine tubes; 18 × UC 200 mines; 3 × 50 cm (19.7 in) torpedo tubes (2 bow/external; one stern); 7 × torpedoes; 1 × 8.8 cm (3.5 in) Uk L/30 deck gun
- Notes: 30-second diving time

Service record
- Part of: I Flotilla; 5 March – 4 July 1917; Flandern / Flandern II Flotilla; 4 July 1917 – 14 July 1918
- Commanders: Kptlt. Reinhard von Rabenau; 29 December 1916 – 29 January 1918; Oblt.z.S. Johannes Ries; 30 January – 14 July 1918
- Operations: 13 patrols
- Victories: 33 merchant ships sunk (50,498 GRT); 2 auxiliary warship sunk (475 GRT); 7 merchant ships damaged (23,734 GRT)

SM UC-77 was a German Type UC II minelaying submarine or U-boat in the German Imperial Navy (German: Kaiserliche Marine) during World War I. The U-boat was ordered on 12 January 1916 and was launched on 2 December 1916. She was commissioned into the German Imperial Navy on 29 December 1916 as SM UC-77. (Note: "SM" stands for "Seiner Majestät" (English: His Majesty's) and combined with the U for Unterseeboot would be translated as His Majesty's Submarine.) In 13 patrols UC-77 was credited with sinking 35 ships, either by torpedo or by mines laid. UC-77 was mined and sunk off Flanders on 11 July 1918.

== Design ==
A Type UC II submarine, UC-77 had a displacement of 410 tonnes (400 long tons) when at the surface and 493 tonnes (485 long tons) while submerged. She had a length overall of 50.45 m (165 ft 6 in), a beam of 5.22 m (17 ft 2 in), and a draught of 3.65 m (12 ft). The submarine was powered by two six-cylinder four-stroke diesel engines each producing 290–300 metric horsepower (210–220 kW; 290–300 shp) (a total of 580–600 metric horsepower (430–440 kW; 570–590 shp)), two electric motors producing 620 metric horsepower (460 kW; 610 shp), and two propeller shafts. She had a dive time of 30 seconds and was capable of operating at a depth of 50 metres (160 ft).

The submarine had a maximum surface speed of 11.8 knots (21.9 km/h; 13.6 mph) and a submerged speed of 7.3 knots (13.5 km/h; 8.4 mph). When submerged, she could operate for 52 nautical miles (96 km; 60 mi) at 4 knots (7.4 km/h; 4.6 mph); when surfaced, she could travel 8,660 to 10,230 nautical miles (16,040 to 18,950 km; 9,970 to 11,770 mi) at 7 knots (13 km/h; 8.1 mph). UC-77 was fitted with six 100 centimetres (39 in) mine tubes, eighteen UC 200 mines, three 50 centimetres (20 in) torpedo tubes (one on the stern and two on the bow), seven torpedoes, and one 8.8 cm (3.5 in) Uk L/30 deck gun. Her complement was twenty-six crew members.

== Summary of raiding history ==
Date	Name	Nationality	Tonnage (Note: Merchant ship tonnages are in gross register tons. Military vessels are listed by tons displacement.)	Fate
24 March 1917	Grenmar	Norway	1,438	Sunk
25 March 1917	Prince of Wales	United Kingdom	158	Sunk
27 March 1917	Galatia	United Kingdom	150	Sunk
27 March 1917	Nova	Norway	1,034	Sunk
27 March 1917	Sandvik	Norway	591	Sunk
28 March 1917	Moulmein	United Kingdom	151	Sunk
28 March 1917	Tizona	Norway	1,021	Sunk
30 March 1917	Petrel	United Kingdom	151	Sunk
26 April 1917	HMT Repro	Royal Navy	230	Sunk
3 May 1917	Glen Tanar	United Kingdom	817	Sunk
4 May 1917	Herrington	United Kingdom	1,258	Sunk
4 May 1917	Vale	Norway	720	Sunk
4 May 1917	Wolseley	United Kingdom	159	Damaged
5 May 1917	Odense	Denmark	1,756	Sunk
6 May 1917	Kaparika	Norway	1,232	Sunk
3 June 1917	Virgilia	United Kingdom	209	Sunk
6 June 1917	Anton	Sweden	1,568	Sunk
6 June 1917	Harald Klitgaard	Denmark	1,799	Sunk
11 July 1917	Vordingborg	Denmark	2,155	Sunk
13 July 1917	Ascain	France	1,686	Sunk
8 August 1917	Berlengas	Portugal	3,548	Sunk
11 August 1917	Sonnie	United Kingdom	2,642	Sunk
7 September 1917	Scottish Prince	United Kingdom	2,897	Damaged
10 September 1917	Ioanna	United Kingdom	3,459	Damaged
15 October 1917	Leander	United Kingdom	2,793	Damaged
19 October 1917	Eldra	United Kingdom	227	Sunk
17 November 1917	Adolph Andersen	Denmark	981	Sunk
18 November 1917	Antwerpen	United Kingdom	1,637	Sunk
18 November 1917	Gisella	United Kingdom	2,502	Sunk
19 November 1917	Amiral Zede	France	5,980	Sunk
19 November 1917	Clangula	United Kingdom	1,754	Sunk
19 November 1917	Robert Brown	United Kingdom	119	Sunk
30 November 1917	Remoqueur N° 8	France	250	Sunk
7 March 1918	Cliffside	United Kingdom	4,969	Damaged
10 March 1918	Skrymer	Norway	1,476	Sunk
18 March 1918	Baygitano	United Kingdom	3,073	Sunk
15 April 1918	City of Winchester	United Kingdom	7,981	Damaged
15 April 1918	Pomeranian	United Kingdom	4,241	Sunk
6 June 1918	Huntsland	United Kingdom	2,871	Sunk
9 June 1918	Moidart	United Kingdom	1,303	Sunk
10 June 1918	Saint Barthelemy	France	1,476	Damaged
14 June 1918	HMT Princess Olga	Royal Navy	245	Sunk
