= SM UC-70 =

German Type UC II minelaying submarine or U-boat

Coordinates: 51°14′N 2°55′E

History

German Empire
- Name: UC-70
- Ordered: 12 January 1916
- Builder: Blohm & Voss, Hamburg
- Yard number: 286
- Launched: 7 August 1916
- Commissioned: 20 November 1916
- Fate: Sunk, 28 August 1918

General characteristics
- Class & type: Type UC II submarine
- Displacement: 427 t (420 long tons), surfaced; 508 t (500 long tons), submerged
- Length: 50.35 m (165 ft 2 in) o/a; 40.30 m (132 ft 3 in) pressure hull
- Beam: 5.22 m (17 ft 2 in) o/a; 3.65 m (12 ft) pressure hull
- Draught: 3.64 m (11 ft 11 in)
- Propulsion: 2 × propeller shafts; 2 × 6-cylinder, 4-stroke diesel engines, 600 PS (440 kW; 590 shp); 2 × electric motors, 620 PS (460 kW; 610 shp)
- Speed: 12.0 knots (22.2 km/h; 13.8 mph), surfaced; 7.4 knots (13.7 km/h; 8.5 mph), submerged
- Range: 10,420 nmi (19,300 km; 11,990 mi) at 7 knots (13 km/h; 8.1 mph) surfaced; 52 nmi (96 km; 60 mi) at 4 knots (7.4 km/h; 4.6 mph) submerged
- Test depth: 50 m (160 ft)
- Complement: 26
- Armament: 6 × 100 cm (39.4 in) mine tubes; 18 × UC 200 mines; 3 × 50 cm (19.7 in) torpedo tubes (2 bow/external; one stern); 7 × torpedoes; 1 × 8.8 cm (3.5 in) Uk L/30 deck gun
- Notes: 35-second diving time

Service record
- Part of: Flandern / Flandern II Flotilla; 22 February 1917 – 28 August 1918
- Commanders: Oblt.z.S. Werner Fürbinger; 22 November 1916 – 22 June 1917; Oblt.z.S. Kurt Loch; 15 April – 8 June 1918; Oblt.z.S. Karl Dobberstein; 8 June – 28 August 1918
- Operations: 10 patrols
- Victories: 33 merchant ships sunk (27,078 GRT); 6 merchant ships damaged (26,661 GRT); 1 auxiliary warship damaged (852 GRT)

SM UC-70 was a German Type UC II minelaying submarine or U-boat in the German Imperial Navy (German: Kaiserliche Marine) during World War I. The U-boat was ordered on 12 January 1916 and was launched on 7 August 1916. She was commissioned into the German Imperial Navy on 20 November 1916 as SM UC-70. (Note: "SM" stands for "Seiner Majestät" (English: His Majesty's) and combined with the U for Unterseeboot would be translated as His Majesty's Submarine.) In ten patrols UC-70 was credited with sinking 33 ships, either by torpedo or by mines laid. On 28 August 1918, UC-70 was spotted lying submerged on the sea bottom and attacked by a Blackburn Kangaroo patrol aircraft of No. 246 Squadron RAF and then was then sunk by depth charges from the British destroyer HMS Ouse. The wreck is a Protected Wreck managed by Historic England.

== Design ==
A Type UC II submarine, UC-70 had a displacement of 427 tonnes (420 long tons) when at the surface and 508 tonnes (500 long tons) while submerged. She had a length overall of 50.35 m (165 ft 2 in), a beam of 5.22 m (17 ft 2 in), and a draught of 3.64 m (11 ft 11 in). The submarine was powered by two six-cylinder four-stroke diesel engines each producing 300 metric horsepower (220 kW; 300 shp) (a total of 600 metric horsepower (440 kW; 590 shp)), two electric motors producing 620 metric horsepower (460 kW; 610 shp), and two propeller shafts. She had a dive time of 48 seconds and was capable of operating at a depth of 50 metres (160 ft).

The submarine had a maximum surface speed of 12 knots (22 km/h; 14 mph) and a submerged speed of 7.4 knots (13.7 km/h; 8.5 mph). When submerged, she could operate for 52 nautical miles (96 km; 60 mi) at 4 knots (7.4 km/h; 4.6 mph); when surfaced, she could travel 10,420 nautical miles (19,300 km; 11,990 mi) at 7 knots (13 km/h; 8.1 mph). UC-70 was fitted with six 100 centimetres (39 in) mine tubes, eighteen UC 200 mines, three 50 centimetres (20 in) torpedo tubes (one on the stern and two on the bow), seven torpedoes, and one 8.8 cm (3.5 in) Uk L/30 deck gun. Her complement was twenty-six crew members.

== Summary of raiding history ==
Date	Name	Nationality	Tonnage (Note: Merchant ship tonnages are in gross register tons. Military vessels are listed by tons displacement.)	Fate
14 February 1917	Marthe Yvonne	France	30	Sunk
16 March 1917	Cordouan	France	28	Sunk
16 March 1917	Margaret VI	French Navy	852	Damaged
17 March 1917	Alcide Marie	France	26	Sunk
17 March 1917	Camille Emile	France	20	Sunk
17 March 1917	Dieu Te Garde	France	30	Sunk
17 March 1917	Juliette	France	29	Sunk
17 March 1917	Louis XIV	France	44	Sunk
17 March 1917	Notre Dame Du Perpetuel Secours	France	29	Sunk
17 March 1917	Nozal	France	34	Sunk
17 March 1917	Renee Islander	France	25	Sunk
17 March 1917	Rupella	France	38	Sunk
17 March 1917	Tasso	United Kingdom	1,859	Sunk
18 March 1917	Madone	France	31	Sunk
18 March 1917	Entente Cordiale	France	22	Sunk
18 March 1917	Felicite Albert	France	32	Sunk
18 March 1917	Hyacinthe Yvonne	France	43	Sunk
19 March 1917	Bergsli	Norway	2,133	Sunk
19 March 1917	Michel	France	1,773	Sunk
24 March 1917	Tapir	France	200	Sunk
16 April 1917	Eduard	United Kingdom	476	Sunk
17 April 1917	Nirvana	United Kingdom	6,021	Damaged
30 April 1917	Eden	Norway	1,304	Sunk
7 May 1917	Lowmount	United Kingdom	2,070	Sunk
18 May 1917	C.E.C.G.	United Kingdom	47	Sunk
18 May 1917	Dromore	United Kingdom	268	Sunk
23 May 1917	Begona N°3	Spain	2,699	Sunk
27 May 1917	General De Boisdeffre	France	2,195	Sunk
28 May 1917	Ancona	United Kingdom	1,168	Sunk
27 May 1918	Wayside Flower	United Kingdom	21	Sunk
28 May 1918	Coronation	United Kingdom	19	Sunk
4 June 1918	Cento	United Kingdom	3,708	Damaged
9 July 1918	Frederika	Netherlands	91	Sunk
17 July 1918	Elin	Norway	139	Damaged
21 July 1918	Genesee	United Kingdom	2,830	Damaged
21 July 1918	Mongolian	United Kingdom	4,892	Sunk
23 July 1918	Boorara	Australia	6,570	Damaged
24 July 1918	Kilkis	Greece	4,302	Sunk
26 July 1918	Ango	France	7,393	Damaged
28 August 1918	Giralda	United Kingdom	1,100	Sunk

== Loss ==
UC-70 was depth charged and sunk off Whitby, Yorkshire on 28 August 1918 with the loss of all 31 crew. The wreck was given protected status by Historic England in 2017.
