= SM UB-32 =

Coordinates: 51°45′N 2°5′E

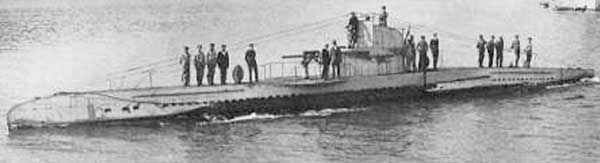
- SM UB-45, a U-boat similar to UB-32

History

German Empire
- Name: UB-32
- Ordered: 22 July 1915
- Builder: Blohm & Voss, Hamburg
- Cost: 1,152,000 German Papiermark
- Yard number: 256
- Launched: 4 December 1915
- Completed: 10 April 1916
- Commissioned: 11 April 1916
- Fate: Lost after 17 September 1917; Possibly sunk on 22 September 1917

General characteristics
- Class & type: Type UB II submarine
- Displacement: 274 t (270 long tons) surfaced; 303 t (298 long tons) submerged
- Length: 36.90 m (121 ft 1 in) o/a; 27.90 m (91 ft 6 in) pressure hull
- Beam: 4.37 m (14 ft 4 in) o/a; 3.85 m (12 ft 8 in) pressure hull
- Draught: 3.69 m (12 ft 1 in)
- Propulsion: 1 × propeller shaft; 2 × 6-cylinder diesel engine, 270 PS (200 kW; 270 bhp); 2 × electric motor, 280 PS (210 kW; 280 shp)
- Speed: 9.06 knots (16.78 km/h; 10.43 mph) surfaced; 5.71 knots (10.57 km/h; 6.57 mph) submerged
- Range: 7,030 nmi (13,020 km; 8,090 mi) at 5 knots (9.3 km/h; 5.8 mph) surfaced; 45 nmi (83 km; 52 mi) at 4 knots (7.4 km/h; 4.6 mph) submerged
- Test depth: 50 m (160 ft)
- Complement: 2 officers, 21 men
- Armament: 2 × 50 cm (19.7 in) torpedo tubes; 4 × torpedoes (later 6); 1 × 8.8 cm (3.5 in) Uk L/30 deck gun
- Notes: 42-second diving time

Service record
- Part of: Baltic Flotilla; 25 May 1916 – 24 February 1917; Flandern Flotilla; 24 February – 22 September 1917
- Commanders: Kptlt. Ludwig Karl Sahl; 11 April – 4 December 1916; Oblt.z.S. Karl Ruprecht; 5 December 1916 – 24 February 1917; Kptlt. Max Viebeg; 25 February – 5 August 1917; Oblt.z.S. Benno von Ditfurth; 6 August – 22 September 1917
- Operations: 16 patrols
- Victories: 22 merchant ships sunk (42,893 GRT); 2 merchant ships damaged (10,743 GRT); 2 auxiliary warships damaged (9,190 GRT)

SM UB-32 was a German Type UB II submarine or U-boat in the German Imperial Navy (German: Kaiserliche Marine) during World War I. The U-boat was ordered on 22 July 1915 and launched on 4 December 1915. She was commissioned into the German Imperial Navy on 11 April 1916 as SM UB-32. (Note: "SM" stands for "Seiner Majestät" (English: His Majesty's) and combined with the U for Unterseeboot would be translated as His Majesty's Submarine.)

The submarine sank 22 ships in 16 patrols. She was last heard from on 17 September 1917 and may have been bombed and sunk by Royal Naval Air Service aircraft in the English Channel on 22 September 1917. The wreck was found in the 1980s but only identified as UB-32 in 2021.

== Design ==
A Type UB II submarine, UB-32 had a displacement of 274 tonnes (270 long tons) when at the surface and 303 tonnes (298 long tons) while submerged. She had a total length of 36.90 m (121 ft 1 in), a beam of 4.37 m (14 ft 4 in), and a draught of 3.69 m (12 ft 1 in). The submarine was powered by two Benz six-cylinder diesel engines producing a total 270 metric horsepower (270 shp; 200 kW), two Siemens-Schuckert electric motors producing 280 metric horsepower (210 kW; 280 shp), and one propeller shaft. She was capable of operating at depths of up to 50 metres (160 ft).

The submarine had a maximum surface speed of 9.06 knots (16.78 km/h; 10.43 mph) and a maximum submerged speed of 5.71 knots (10.57 km/h; 6.57 mph). When submerged, she could operate for 45 nautical miles (83 km; 52 mi) at 4 knots (7.4 km/h; 4.6 mph); when surfaced, she could travel 7,030 nautical miles (13,020 km; 8,090 mi) at 5 knots (9.3 km/h; 5.8 mph). UB-32 was fitted with two 50 centimetres (20 in) torpedo tubes, four torpedoes, and one 8.8 cm (3.5 in) Uk L/30 deck gun. She had a complement of twenty-one crew members and two officers and a 42-second dive time.

== Summary of raiding history ==
Date	Name	Nationality	Tonnage (Note: Merchant ship tonnages are in gross register tons. Military vessels are listed by tons displacement.)	Fate
13 March 1917	Comrades	United Kingdom	58	Sunk
13 March 1917	De Tien Kinders	Belgium	44	Sunk
13 March 1917	Gold Seeker	United Kingdom	62	Sunk
30 March 1917	HMS Penshurst	Royal Navy	1,191	Damaged
31 March 1917	Boaz	United Kingdom	111	Sunk
31 March 1917	Gippeswic	United Kingdom	116	Sunk
31 March 1917	HMHS Gloucester Castle	Royal Navy	7,999	Damaged
31 March 1917	Queen Louise	United Kingdom	4,879	Damaged
1 April 1917	Endymion	United Kingdom	73	Sunk
4 April 1917	Parana	Brazil	4,461	Sunk
5 April 1917	Ernest Legouve	France	2,246	Sunk
24 April 1917	Marie Blanche	France	359	Sunk
25 April 1917	Ballarat	United Kingdom	11,120	Sunk
27 April 1917	Alfalfa	United Kingdom	2,993	Sunk
27 April 1917	Beemah	United Kingdom	4,750	Sunk
28 April 1917	Pursue	United Kingdom	37	Sunk
29 April 1917	Ellen Harrison	United Kingdom	103	Sunk
29 April 1917	Mermaid	United Kingdom	76	Sunk
30 April 1917	Portbail	France	378	Sunk
8 June 1917	Vinaes	Norway	1,107	Sunk
11 June 1917	Mar Cor	Kingdom of Italy	3,257	Sunk
12 June 1917	South Point	United Kingdom	4,258	Sunk
14 June 1917	Vigoureuse	France	152	Sunk
5 July 1917	Havbris	Norway	677	Sunk
6 July 1917	Wabasha	United Kingdom	5,864	Damaged
26 August 1917	Feltre	Kingdom of Italy	6,455	Sunk

== Wreck and identification as UB-32 ==
In the 1980s a shipwreck was discovered by the Flemish Hydrographic Service some 50 kilometer from the Belgian shore and was put on the map as B140/225. In 2009 some extensive dives were made and it became clear that it was the remains of a U-boat. The wreck is at a maximum depth of 41 meters and it lies on its port side. The remains extend over a length of about 35 meters, with a width of 5 meters. The highest point is the tower, which rises about 6 meters above the ground. The submarine is intact from the stern to about 2 meters in front of the turret. The bow has been completely destroyed, apparently by a heavy impact, and it appears to have been squashed from above, with the hull split in two lengthwise. At 20 meters from the bow lie two large iron fragments on the port side, pieces of the pressure hull of the submarine, probably from the 2 forward depth rudders. The 2 periscopes have been retracted and it is striking that the heads of the periscopes, with the lid, eyepiece and glass, have cracked open. The tail of the U-boat was partly covered with lost nets and ropes. After they were partially removed, the bronze starboard propeller of the submarine was found on which was the inscription: "B & V, 1150 mm, 660, Projiz Flache 8416, Mangan Bronze, STB Schiffsschr. 6, UB.32". After some digging, the port propeller could also be found. The fact that the submarine has two propellers makes it clear that it is a submarine of type UB-II.

The damage which is clearly visible on the wreckage confirms that the UB-32 sank by a heavy impact from above. The fact that two hatches were closed and that both periscopes were retracted may indicate that the UB-32 was submerged when hit or diving. The bow with the accommodation for the crew, the torpedo hold and the battery compartments, has been completely disassembled. That damage cannot be due to a mine explosion. Mines usually lead to a blown bow or stern, a crack in the hull or a severe dent on the underside of the hull. With this wreck it is clear that an impact from on top of the submarine has led to the 'squeezed' appearance of the wreck. The top deck seems to have split in half. Relatively large fragments have also been found at a distance from the wreck, such as the sheet-iron pieces of the front depth rudders. All of this points to a major explosion, possibly followed by a second, internal explosion. The force that was developed was so great that it caused the fragments to fling and the two periscope heads to explode. Such a violent explosion can be caused by a depth bomb or aircraft bomb or the impact of a torpedo. This seems to somewhat corroborate the British claims that the submarine was sunk from above by a plane.

== Bibliography ==
- Bendert, Harald (2000). Die UB-Boote der Kaiserlichen Marine, 1914-1918. Einsätze, Erfolge, Schicksal (in German). Hamburg: Verlag E.S. Mittler & Sohn GmbH. ISBN 3-8132-0713-7.
- Gröner, Erich; Jung, Dieter; Maass, Martin (1991). U-boats and Mine Warfare Vessels. German Warships 1815–1945. Vol. 2. Translated by Thomas, Keith; Magowan, Rachel. London: Conway Maritime Press. ISBN 0-85177-593-4.
- Rössler, Eberhard (1979). Die deutschen U-Boote und ihre Werften: eine Bilddokumentation über den deutschen U-Bootbau; in zwei Bänden (in German). Vol. I. Munich: Bernard & Graefe. ISBN 3-7637-5213-7.
