= SS Ausonia =

Several ships have shared the name SS Ausonia:

- SS Ausonia (1883), sunk by a torpedo attack in 1917
- SS Ausonia, previously SS Catania (1894) from 1894 to 1904, sunk by torpedo attack in 1917
- SS Ausonia (1909), formerly SS Tortona, owned by the Cunard Line from 1911 to 1918
- SS Ausonia (1914) — see German aircraft carrier I
- SS Ausonia (1956) — see SS Ivory

== See also ==
- Ausonia (disambiguation)
