= SM UC-45 =

German Type UC II minelaying U-boat

Coordinates: 54°9′N 7°35′E

History

German Empire
- Name: UC-45
- Ordered: 20 November 1915
- Builder: AG Vulcan, Hamburg
- Yard number: 78
- Launched: 20 October 1916
- Commissioned: 18 November 1916
- Fate: Surrendered, 24 November 1918; broken up, 1919 – 20

General characteristics
- Class & type: Type UC II submarine
- Displacement: 400 t (390 long tons), surfaced; 480 t (470 long tons), submerged
- Length: 49.45 m (162 ft 3 in) o/a; 40.30 m (132 ft 3 in) pressure hull
- Beam: 5.22 m (17 ft 2 in) o/a; 3.65 m (12 ft) pressure hull
- Draught: 3.68 m (12 ft 1 in)
- Propulsion: 2 × propeller shafts; 2 × 6-cylinder, 4-stroke diesel engines, 520 PS (380 kW; 510 shp); 2 × electric motors, 460 PS (340 kW; 450 shp)
- Speed: 11.7 knots (21.7 km/h; 13.5 mph), surfaced; 6.7 knots (12.4 km/h; 7.7 mph), submerged
- Range: 9,410 nmi (17,430 km; 10,830 mi) at 7 knots (13 km/h; 8.1 mph) surfaced; 60 nmi (110 km; 69 mi) at 4 knots (7.4 km/h; 4.6 mph) submerged
- Test depth: 50 m (160 ft)
- Complement: 26
- Armament: 6 × 100 cm (39.4 in) mine tubes; 18 × UC 200 mines; 3 × 50 cm (19.7 in) torpedo tubes (2 bow/external; one stern); 7 × torpedoes; 1 × 8.8 cm (3.5 in) Uk L/30 deck gun
- Notes: 48-second diving time

Service record
- Part of: I Flotilla; 10 February – 17 September 1917
- Commanders: Kptlt. Hubert Aust; 18 November 1916 – 27 July 1917; Oblt.z.S. Hans Soergel; 28 July – 31 August 1917; Oblt.z.S. Werner Ackermann; 1 – 17 September 1917
- Operations: 5 patrols
- Victories: 12 merchant ships sunk (16,854 GRT)

SM UC-45 (Note: "SM" stands for "Seiner Majestät" (English: His Majesty's) and combined with the U for Unterseeboot would be translated as His Majesty's Submarine.) was a German Type UC II minelaying submarine or U-boat in the German Imperial Navy (German: Kaiserliche Marine) during World War I. The U-boat was ordered on 20 November 1915 and was launched on 20 October 1916. She was commissioned into the German Imperial Navy on 18 November 1916 as SM UC-45. In five patrols UC-45 was credited with sinking 12 ships, either by torpedo or by mines laid. UC-45 sank in a diving accident on 17 September 1917 in the North Sea. The German salvage vessel Vulkan raised the wreck and UC-45 re-entered service on 24 October 1918. She was surrendered on 24 November 1918 and broken up at Preston in 1919–20.

== Design ==
A Type UC II submarine, UC-45 had a displacement of 400 tonnes (390 long tons) when at the surface and 480 tonnes (470 long tons) while submerged. She had a length overall of 49.45 m (162 ft 3 in), a beam of 5.22 m (17 ft 2 in), and a draught of 3.68 m (12 ft 1 in). The submarine was powered by two six-cylinder four-stroke diesel engines each producing 260 metric horsepower (190 kW; 260 shp) (a total of 520 metric horsepower (380 kW; 510 shp)), two electric motors producing 460 metric horsepower (340 kW; 450 shp), and two propeller shafts. She had a dive time of 48 seconds and was capable of operating at a depth of 50 metres (160 ft).

The submarine had a maximum surface speed of 11.7 knots (21.7 km/h; 13.5 mph) and a submerged speed of 6.7 knots (12.4 km/h; 7.7 mph). When submerged, she could operate for 60 nautical miles (110 km; 69 mi) at 4 knots (7.4 km/h; 4.6 mph); when surfaced, she could travel 9,410 nautical miles (17,430 km; 10,830 mi) at 7 knots (13 km/h; 8.1 mph). UC-45 was fitted with six 100 centimetres (39 in) mine tubes, eighteen UC 200 mines, three 50 centimetres (20 in) torpedo tubes (one on the stern and two on the bow), seven torpedoes, and one 8.8 cm (3.5 in) Uk L/30 deck gun. Her complement was twenty-six crew members.

== Summary of raiding history ==
Date	Name	Nationality	Tonnage (Note: Tonnages are in gross register tons)	Fate
19 March 1917	Pollux	Norway	1,196	Sunk
22 March 1917	Egenaes	Norway	399	Sunk
22 March 1917	Susanna	Norway	442	Sunk
23 March 1917	Blomwaag	Norway	695	Sunk
17 April 1917	Bretagne	Denmark	1,110	Sunk
17 April 1917	Charles Goodanew	United Kingdom	791	Sunk
18 April 1917	Louisiana	Denmark	3,015	Sunk
26 May 1917	Saint Hubert	France	423	Sunk
28 May 1917	Teie	Norway	1,974	Sunk
4 June 1917	Phemius	United Kingdom	6,699	Sunk
7 June 1917	Golden Hope	United Kingdom	67	Sunk
13 July 1917	Afram	Denmark	43	Sunk
