= SS Setubal =

A number of steamships were named Setubal, including:

- SS Setubal (1890), a cargo ship in service 1890–93
- SS Setubal (1898), a Norwegian cargo ship sunk in 1917
- SS Setubal (1944), a Hansa A Type cargo ship in service in 1945
