= SM U-80 =

Submarine serving in the Imperial German Navy in World War I

History

German Empire
- Name: U-80
- Ordered: 9 March 1915
- Builder: AG Vulkan, Hamburg
- Yard number: 62
- Launched: 22 April 1916
- Commissioned: 6 June 1916
- Fate: 16 January 1919 - Surrendered.; broken up at Swansea in 1919.

General characteristics
- Class & type: Type UE I submarine
- Displacement: 755 t (743 long tons) surfaced; 832 t (819 long tons) submerged
- Length: 56.80 m (186 ft 4 in) (o/a); 46.66 m (153 ft 1 in) (pressure hull)
- Beam: 5.90 m (19 ft 4 in) (o/a); 5.00 m (16 ft 5 in) (pressure hull)
- Height: 8.25 m (27 ft 1 in)
- Draught: 4.86 m (15 ft 11 in)
- Installed power: 2 × 900 PS (662 kW; 888 shp) surfaced; 2 × 900 PS (662 kW; 888 shp) submerged
- Propulsion: 2 shafts, 2× 1.41 m (4 ft 8 in) propellers
- Speed: 9.9 knots (18.3 km/h; 11.4 mph) surfaced; 7.9 knots (14.6 km/h; 9.1 mph) submerged
- Range: 7,880 nmi (14,590 km; 9,070 mi) at 7 knots (13 km/h; 8.1 mph) surfaced; 83 nmi (154 km; 96 mi) at 4 knots (7.4 km/h; 4.6 mph) submerged
- Test depth: 50 m (164 ft 1 in)
- Complement: 4 officers, 28 enlisted
- Armament: 2 × 50 cm (19.7 in) torpedo tubes (one port bow, one starbord stern); 4 torpedoes; 1 × 8.8 cm (3.5 in) SK L/30 deck guns

Service record
- Part of: I Flotilla; 27 August 1916 – 11 November 1918
- Commanders: Kptlt. Alfred von Glasenapp; 6 June 1916 – 31 July 1917; Kptlt. Gustav Amberger; 1 August – 30 October 1917; Kptlt. Karl Scherb; 31 October – 22 December 1917; Kptlt. Karl Koopmann; 23 December 1917 – 11 November 1918
- Operations: 16 patrols
- Victories: 21 merchant ships sunk (33,343 GRT); 2 warship sunk (1,775 tons); 4 auxiliary warships sunk (15,537 GRT); 3 merchant ships damaged (29,631 GRT); 1 auxiliary warship damaged (5,977 GRT)

SM U-80 was one of the 329 submarines serving in the Imperial German Navy in World War I. U-80 was engaged in the naval warfare and took part in the First Battle of the Atlantic.

U-80 is credited for sinking the Laurentic, the 24th largest ship sunk in World War I by U-boats, at 14,892 GRT. She struck two mines laid by U-80 off Malin Head, and sank within one hour. She went down with 345 casualties, and 35 tons of gold ingots. U-80 is also credited with damaging the 6th largest ship, the Celtic, at 20,904 GRT, 15 February 1917 at 53°57′N 04°40′W. Celtic would be torpedoed later in the war by UB-77, but was beached and later salvaged.

U-80 was surrendered to the Allies at Harwich on 16 January 1919 in accordance with the requirements of the Armistice with Germany. She was sold by the British Admiralty to George Cohen on 3 March 1919 for £2,300 (excluding engines), and was broken up at Swansea.

== Design ==
Type UE I submarines were preceded by the longer Type U 66 submarines. U-80 had a displacement of 755 tonnes (743 long tons) when at the surface and 832 tonnes (819 long tons) while submerged. She had a total length of 56.80 m (186 ft 4 in), a pressure hull length of 46.66 m (153 ft 1 in), a beam of 5.90 m (19 ft 4 in), a height of 8.25 m (27 ft 1 in), and a draught of 4.86 m (15 ft 11 in). The submarine was powered by two 900 metric horsepower (660 kW; 890 shp) engines for use while surfaced, and two 900 metric horsepower (660 kW; 890 shp) engines for use while submerged. She had two propeller shafts. She was capable of operating at depths of up to 50 metres (160 ft).

The submarine had a maximum surface speed of 9.9 knots (18.3 km/h; 11.4 mph) and a maximum submerged speed of 7.9 knots (14.6 km/h; 9.1 mph). When submerged, she could operate for 83 nautical miles (154 km; 96 mi) at 4 knots (7.4 km/h; 4.6 mph); when surfaced, she could travel 7,880 nautical miles (14,590 km; 9,070 mi) at 7 knots (13 km/h; 8.1 mph). U-80 was fitted with two 50 centimetres (20 in) torpedo tubes (one at the port bow and one starboard stern), four torpedoes, and one 8.8 cm (3.5 in) SK L/30 deck gun. She had a complement of thirty-two (twenty-eight crew members and four officers).

== Summary of raiding history ==
Date	Name	Nationality	Tonnage (Note: Merchant ship tonnages are in gross register tons. Military vessels are listed by tons displacement.)	Fate
4 November 1916	Skerries	United Kingdom	4,278	Sunk
18 December 1916	Opal	United Kingdom	599	Sunk
19 December 1916	Liverpool	United Kingdom	686	Sunk
25 January 1917	HMS Laurentic	Royal Navy	14,892	Sunk
15 February 1917	Celtic	United Kingdom	20,904	Damaged
1 March 1917	HMS Pheasant	Royal Navy	1,025	Sunk
3 March 1917	Hermes	Norway	785	Sunk
10 March 1917	San Eduardo	United Kingdom	6,225	Damaged
16 March 1917	HMS Motagua	Royal Navy	5,977	Damaged
17 April 1917	Gisella	United Kingdom	2,502	Damaged
7 May 1917	H. H. Petersen	Denmark	192	Sunk
7 May 1917	Sophie	Denmark	237	Sunk
9 May 1917	Hans Broge	Denmark	1,432	Sunk
11 May 1917	Anna Alwina	Russian Empire	364	Sunk
11 May 1917	Calchas	United Kingdom	6,748	Sunk
21 May 1917	HMT Senator	Royal Navy	211	Sunk
1 July 1917	Don Emilio	United Kingdom	3,651	Sunk
15 August 1917	Hylas	United Kingdom	4,240	Sunk
16 August 1917	Caroline Kock	Denmark	316	Sunk
20 August 1917	HMT Kirkland	Royal Navy	224	Sunk
25 August 1917	Junona	Russian Empire	3,462	Sunk
6 September 1917	Tuskar	United Kingdom	1,159	Sunk
17 December 1917	Neptune	United Kingdom	50	Sunk
19 December 1917	Arno	Denmark	1,386	Sunk
23 April 1918	HMT Plethos	Royal Navy	210	Sunk
1 May 1918	HMS Blackmorevale	Royal Navy	750	Sunk
5 June 1918	Anton	Sweden	1,036	Sunk
29 June 1918	Midtsjö	Norway	185	Sunk
3 July 1918	Gripen	Sweden	1,191	Sunk
3 July 1918	P. C. Peterson	Norway	673	Sunk
11 October 1918	Helvetia	Norway	673	Sunk

== Bibliography ==
- Gröner, Erich; Jung, Dieter; Maass, Martin (1991). U-boats and Mine Warfare Vessels. German Warships 1815–1945. Vol. 2. Translated by Thomas, Keith; Magowan, Rachel. London: Conway Maritime Press. ISBN 0-85177-593-4.
