= SS Catania (1906) =

Italian passenger ship (1906–1917)

History

Italy
- Name: Catania
- Namesake: Catania
- Owner: Societa Italiana di Servizi Marittimi
- Port of registry: Kingdom of Italy, Genoa
- Route: Naples - Bombay
- Builder: Cantieri Nav. Bacini e Stab. Mec. Siciliani, Palermo
- Yard number: 9
- Completed: 1906
- Acquired: 1906
- Maiden voyage: 1906
- In service: 1906
- Out of service: 16 March 1917
- Identification: Official number: 695
- Fate: Torpedoed and sunk on 16 March 1917

General characteristics
- Type: Passenger ship
- Tonnage: 3,188 GRT
- Length: 95.8 m (314 ft 4 in)
- Beam: 13 m (42 ft 8 in)
- Depth: 5.5 m (18 ft 1 in)
- Installed power: 3 cyl. triple expansion steam engine
- Propulsion: 1 screw propeller
- Speed: 13.5 knots (25.0 km/h; 15.5 mph)
- Capacity: 17 passengers
- Crew: 100
- Notes: 2 masts and 1 funnel

SS Catania was an Italian passenger ship that was torpedoed and sunk by the German submarine SM U-64 15 nautical miles (28 km) off Belvedere Calabro in the Mediterranean Sea on 16 March 1917 with the loss of 84 lives, while she was travelling from Bombay, India to Naples, Italy.

== Construction ==
Catania was built at the Cantieri Nav. Bacini e Stab. Mec. Siciliani shipyard in Palermo, Italy in 1906, and completed later that year. The ship was 95.8 metres (314 ft 4 in) long, had a beam of 13 metres (42 ft 8 in) and a depth of 5.5 metres (18 ft 1 in). She was assessed at 3,188 gross register tons (GRT) and had one 3-cylinder triple expansion steam engine producing 288 nhp, driving a single screw propeller. The ship could reach a maximum speed of 13.5 knots (25.0 km/h; 15.5 mph) and possessed two masts and one funnel. As built, she had the capacity to carry 17 passengers and 100 crew.

== Sinking ==
Catania was travelling from Bombay, India to Naples, Italy under the command of Captain Pietro De Amezaga while carrying 17 Indian and Portuguese passengers alongside 100 crew members, when she was hit by a torpedo from SM U-64 15 nautical miles (28 km) off Belvedere Calabro in the Mediterranean Sea on 16 March 1917. Catania sank with the loss of 84 crew members including Captain De Amezaga, while the remaining passengers and crew survived.

== Wreck ==
The wreck of Catania lies at (39°32′N 15°42′E) in 980 feet (300 m) of water. The wreck was discovered in 2018 following a search from the Italian government to locate ships that were deliberately sunk by the Italian mafia containing toxic and nuclear waste. The current condition of the wreck is unknown.
