= SM UC-43 =

1915 German Type UC II minelaying U-boat

History

German Empire
- Name: UC-43
- Ordered: 20 November 1915
- Builder: AG Vulcan, Hamburg
- Yard number: 76
- Launched: 5 October 1916
- Commissioned: 25 October 1916
- Fate: Torpedoed and sunk on 10 March 1917

General characteristics
- Class & type: Type UC II submarine
- Displacement: 400 t (390 long tons), surfaced; 480 t (470 long tons), submerged
- Length: 49.45 m (162 ft 3 in) o/a; 40.30 m (132 ft 3 in) pressure hull
- Beam: 5.22 m (17 ft 2 in) o/a; 3.65 m (12 ft) pressure hull
- Draught: 3.68 m (12 ft 1 in)
- Propulsion: 2 × propeller shafts; 2 × 6-cylinder, 4-stroke diesel engines, 520 PS (380 kW; 510 shp); 2 × electric motors, 460 PS (340 kW; 450 shp)
- Speed: 11.7 knots (21.7 km/h; 13.5 mph), surfaced; 6.7 knots (12.4 km/h; 7.7 mph), submerged
- Range: 9,410 nmi (17,430 km; 10,830 mi) at 7 knots (13 km/h; 8.1 mph) surfaced; 60 nmi (110 km; 69 mi) at 4 knots (7.4 km/h; 4.6 mph) submerged
- Test depth: 50 m (160 ft)
- Complement: 26
- Armament: 6 × 100 cm (39.4 in) mine tubes; 18 × UC 200 mines; 3 × 50 cm (19.7 in) torpedo tubes (2 bow/external; one stern); 7 × torpedoes; 1 × 8.8 cm (3.5 in) Uk L/30 deck gun
- Notes: 48-second diving time

Service record
- Part of: I Flotilla; 25 December 1916 – 10 March 1917
- Commanders: Kptlt. Erwin Sebelin; 25 October 1916 – 10 March 1917
- Operations: 2 patrols
- Victories: 13 merchant ships sunk (24,684 GRT); 1 merchant ship taken as prize (539 GRT)

SM UC-43 (Note: "SM" stands for "Seiner Majestät" (English: His Majesty's) and combined with the U for Unterseeboot would be translated as His Majesty's Submarine.) was a German Type UC II minelaying submarine or U-boat in the German Imperial Navy (German: Kaiserliche Marine) during World War I. The U-boat was ordered on 20 November 1915 and was launched on 5 October 1916. She was commissioned into the German Imperial Navy on 25 October 1916 as SM UC-43. In two patrols UC-43 was credited with sinking 13 ships, either by torpedo or by mines laid. UC-43 was torpedoed and sunk by HMS G13 north of Muckle Flugga on 10 March 1917.

== Design ==
A Type UC II submarine, UC-43 had a displacement of 400 tonnes (390 long tons) when at the surface and 480 tonnes (470 long tons) while submerged. She had a length overall of 49.45 m (162 ft 3 in), a beam of 5.22 m (17 ft 2 in), and a draught of 3.68 m (12 ft 1 in). The submarine was powered by two six-cylinder four-stroke diesel engines each producing 260 metric horsepower (190 kW; 260 shp) (a total of 520 metric horsepower (380 kW; 510 shp)), two electric motors producing 460 metric horsepower (340 kW; 450 shp), and two propeller shafts. She had a dive time of 48 seconds and was capable of operating at a depth of 50 metres (160 ft).

The submarine had a maximum surface speed of 11.7 knots (21.7 km/h; 13.5 mph) and a submerged speed of 6.7 knots (12.4 km/h; 7.7 mph). When submerged, she could operate for 60 nautical miles (110 km; 69 mi) at 4 knots (7.4 km/h; 4.6 mph); when surfaced, she could travel 9,410 nautical miles (17,430 km; 10,830 mi) at 7 knots (13 km/h; 8.1 mph). UC-43 was fitted with six 100 centimetres (39 in) mine tubes, eighteen UC 200 mines, three 50 centimetres (20 in) torpedo tubes (one on the stern and two on the bow), seven torpedoes, and one 8.8 cm (3.5 in) Uk L/30 deck gun. Her complement was twenty-six crew members.

== Summary of raiding history ==
Date	Name	Nationality	Tonnage (Note: Tonnages are in gross register tons)	Fate
31 December 1916	Lupus	Norway	539	Captured as prize
12 January 1917	Brentwood	United Kingdom	1,192	Sunk
15 January 1917	Brabant	Norway	1,492	Sunk
15 January 1917	Graafjeld	Norway	728	Sunk
20 January 1917	Planudes	United Kingdom	542	Sunk
27 February 1917	Marie Madeleine	France	45	Sunk
1 March 1917	Mabella	Norway	1,637	Sunk
1 March 1917	Storenes	Norway	1,870	Sunk
6 March 1917	Cornelia	United Kingdom	903	Sunk
6 March 1917	Sawa Maru	Japan	2,578	Sunk
7 March 1917	Baron Wemyss	United Kingdom	1,605	Sunk
9 March 1917	Laurits	Denmark	183	Sunk
13 March 1917	Norwegian	United Kingdom	6,237	Sunk
22 March 1917	Malmanger	Norway	5,672	Sunk
