= SM U-70 =

German Imperial Navy's Type U 66 submarine

History

German Empire
- Name: U-70
- Ordered: 2 February 1913
- Builder: Germaniawerft, Kiel
- Yard number: 207
- Laid down: 11 February 1914, as U-11 (Austria-Hungary)
- Launched: 20 July 1915
- Commissioned: 22 September 1915
- Fate: Surrendered 20 November 1918; broken up, 1919–20

General characteristics
- Class & type: Type U 66 submarine
- Displacement: 791 t (779 long tons) surfaced; 933 t (918 long tons) submerged
- Length: 69.50 m (228 ft) (o/a); 54.66 m (179 ft 4 in) (pressure hull)
- Beam: 6.30 m (20 ft 8 in) (o/a); 4.15 m (13 ft 7 in) (pressure hull)
- Height: 7.95 m (26 ft 1 in)
- Draft: 3.79 m (12 ft 5 in)
- Propulsion: 1 × shaft; 2 × Germania 6-cylinder four-stroke diesel engines, 2,269 shp (1,692 kW) total; 2 × Pichler&Co. electric motors, 1,223 shp (912 kW) total
- Speed: 16.8 knots (31.1 km/h; 19.3 mph) surfaced; 10.3 knots (19.1 km/h; 11.9 mph) submerged
- Range: 7,370 nmi (13,650 km; 8,480 mi) at 8 knots (15 km/h; 9.2 mph) surfaced; 115 nmi (213 km; 132 mi) at 4 knots (7.4 km/h; 4.6 mph) submerged
- Test depth: 50 m (160 ft)
- Complement: 4 officers, 32 enlisted men
- Armament: 5 × 45 cm (17.7 in) torpedo tubes (four bow, one stern); 12 torpedoes; 1 × 8.8 cm (3.5 in) SK L/30 deck gun, later replaced by 10.5 cm (4.1 in) SK L/45 deck gun

Service record
- Part of: IV Flotilla; 9 February 1916 – 11 November 1918
- Commanders: Kptlt. Otto Wünsche; 22 September 1915 – 15 September 1918 (Note: On the U 70 page at Uboat.net, Helgason reports that Otto Wünsche was in command only through October 1917, but the listing of ships hit by U-70 from the same website reports that he was still in command as late as July 1918.); Kptlt. Joachim Born; 16 September – 11 November 1918
- Operations: 12 war patrols
- Victories: 52 merchant ships sunk (135,288 GRT); 1 warship sunk (1,290 tons); 5 merchant ships damaged (24,971 GRT)

SM U-70 was a Type U 66 submarine or U-boat for the German Imperial Navy (German: Kaiserliche Marine) during World War I. She had been laid down in February 1914 as U-11 the final boat of the U-7 class for the Austro-Hungarian Navy (German: Kaiserliche und Königliche Kriegsmarine or K.u.K. Kriegsmarine) but was sold to Germany, along with the others in her class, in November 1914.

The submarine was ordered as U-11 from Germaniawerft of Kiel as the last of five boats of the U-7 class for the Austro-Hungarian Navy. After the outbreak of World War I in August 1914, the Austro-Hungarian Navy became convinced that none of the submarines of the class could be delivered to the Adriatic via Gibraltar. As a consequence, the entire class, including U-11, was sold to the German Imperial Navy in November 1914. Under German control, the class became known as the U 66 type and the boats were renumbered; U-11 became U-70, and all were redesigned and reconstructed to German specifications. U-70 was launched in July 1915 and commissioned in September. As completed, she displaced 791 tonnes (779 long tons), surfaced, and 933 tonnes (918 long tons), submerged. The boat was 69.50 metres (228 ft) long and was armed with five torpedo tubes and a deck gun.

A part of the IV Flotilla throughout the war, U-70 sank 52 merchant ships with a combined gross register tonnage (GRT) of 135,288. Included in that total was Southland—at 11,899 GRT, one of the largest ships of the war sunk by a U-boat—sunk in June 1917. In addition she sank one British Flower-class sloop and damaged five merchant ships (24,971 GRT). On 20 November 1918, nine days after the Armistice, U-70 was surrendered to the British. She was broken up at Bo'ness in 1919–20.

== Design and construction ==
After the Austro-Hungarian Navy had competitively evaluated three foreign submarine designs, it selected the Germaniawerft 506d design, also known as the Type UD, for its new U-7 class of five submarines. The Navy ordered five boats on 1 February 1913.

The U-7 class was seen by the Austro-Hungarian Navy as an improved version of its U-3 class, which was also a Germaniawerft design. (Note: The U-3-class submarines, however, were less than half the displacement and nearly 90 feet (27 m) shorter than the U-7 design. See: Gardiner, pp. 342–43.) As designed for the Austro-Hungarian Navy, the boats were to displace 695 tonnes (684 long tons) on the surface and 885 tonnes (871 long tons) while submerged. The doubled-hulled boats were to be 69.50 metres (228 ft) long overall with a beam of 6.30 metres (20.7 ft) and a draft of 3.79 metres (12.4 ft). The Austrian specifications called for two shafts with twin diesel engines (2,300 metric horsepower (2,269 bhp; 1,692 kW) total) for surface running at up to 17 knots (31 km/h; 20 mph), and twin electric motors (1,240 metric horsepower (1,223 shp; 912 kW) total) for a maximum of 11 knots (20 km/h; 13 mph) when submerged. The boats were designed with five 45 cm (17.7 in) torpedo tubes; four located in the bow, one in the stern. The boats' armament was to also include a single 6.6 cm (2.6 in) deck gun.

U-11 was laid down on 11 February 1914, the final boat of the class begun. Her construction was slated to be complete within 29 to 33 months.

Neither U-11 nor any of her sister boats were complete when World War I began in August 1914. With the boats under construction at Kiel, the Austrians became convinced that it would be impossible to take delivery of the boats, which would need to be towed into the Mediterranean past Gibraltar, a British territory. (Note: The Austro-Hungarian Navy's Germaniawerft-built U-3 class boats had been towed from Kiel to Pola via Gibraltar in 1909. See: Sieche, p. 19.) As a result, U-11 and her four sisters were sold to the Imperial German Navy on 28 November 1914. (Note: In April 1915, just five months later, the German U-21 successfully entered the Mediterranean through the Straits of Gibraltar, proving that delivery would have been possible after all. See: Gardiner, p. 343.)

U-11 was renumbered by the Germans as U-70 when her class was redesignated as the Type U 66. The Imperial German Navy had the submarines redesigned and reconstructed to German standards, which increased the surface displacement by 96 tonnes (94 long tons) and the submerged by 48 tonnes (47 long tons). The torpedo load was increased by a third, from 9 to 12, and the deck gun was upgraded from the 6.6 cm (2.6 in) gun originally specified to an 8.8 cm (3.5 in) Uk L/30 one.

== Early career ==
U-70 was launched on 20 July 1915. On 22 September, SM U-70 was commissioned into the German Imperial Navy under the command of Kapitänleutnant Otto Wünsche. (Note: Wünsche was in the Navy's April 1902 cadet class with 29 other future U-boat captains, including Gustav Sieß, Max Valentiner, and Hans Walther. See: Helgason, Guðmundur. "WWI Officer Crews: Crew 4/02". German and Austrian U-boats of World War I - Kaiserliche Marine - Uboat.net.) U-70 was the second U-boat command for the 30-year-old officer; he had commanded U-25 from August 1914 until a week before assignment to U-70. In January 1916, Wünsche and U-70 escorted the German blockade runner Marie through the North Sea. On 9 February, U-70 was assigned to the IV Flotilla (German: IV. Uhalbflotille) in which she remained for the duration of the war. U-70 served as an escort again in late February, when she accompanied the German merchant raider Greif. (Note: SMS Greif (1914) and British armed merchant cruiser Alcantara met and sank each other on 29 February in the North Sea.)

== The second German offensive ==
Germany began its second submarine offensive against shipping in February 1916, the month U-70 had joined the IV Flotilla. As in the first submarine offensive, U-boats were sent independently around Scotland to patrol the Irish Sea and the western entrance to the English Channel. U-70 sank her first ship on 16 March, when she dispatched the British sailing vessel Willie 60 nautical miles (110 km; 69 mi) northwest by west of Fastnet Rock. The same day she also damaged the British cargo ship Berwindale, en route to Avonmouth with a load of wheat from Galveston, Texas. Throughout the rest of March and into early April, U-70 sank an additional five ships of 14,557 gross register tons (GRT); the largest being the British cargo vessel Eagle Point, carrying a load of hay and oats from Saint John, New Brunswick, torpedoed and sunk on 28 March. Near the end of April 1916, Admiral Reinhard Scheer, the new commander-in-chief of the High Seas Fleet (under which U-70's IV Flotilla operated), called off the merchant shipping offensive and ordered all boats at sea to return, and all boats in port to remain there.

== Grand Fleet ambush ==
In mid-May, Scheer completed plans to draw out part of the British Grand Fleet. The German High Seas Fleet would sortie for a raid on Sunderland, luring the British fleet across "'nests' of submarines and mine-fields". U-70 was one of four U-boats that put out to sea beginning on 18 May to scout the central North Sea for signs of the British fleet. Completing five days of scouting, U-70, along with U-63, U-51, U-32, sister boat U-66, U-24, and U-52, took up position off the Firth of Forth on 23 May. The other two other boats, U-43 and U-44, were stationed off Pentland Firth, in position to attack the British fleet leaving Scapa Flow. All the boats were to remain on station until 1 June and await a coded message which would report the sailing of the British fleet. Unfortunately for the Germans, the British Admiralty had intelligence reports of the departure of the submarines which, coupled with an absence of attacks on shipping, aroused British suspicions.

A delayed departure of the German fleet for its sortie (which had been redirected to the Skagerrak) and the failure of five U-boats to receive the coded message warning of the British advance caused Scheer's anticipated ambush to be a "complete and disappointing failure". Although U-70 had received the advance warning of the coded message, her crew did not ever see any part of the fleet. (Note: Sister boat U-66 and U-32 were the only two to report British fleet sightings. See: Gibson and Prendergast, p. 99.) The failure of the submarine ambush to sink any British capital ships allowed the full Grand Fleet to engage the numerically inferior High Seas Fleet in the Battle of Jutland, which took place 31 May – 1 June.

U-70's next success came in December when she sank the 5,587 GRT British steamer Pascal on 17 December. Over the next month she sank an additional 14 ships (19,795 GRT).

== Unrestricted submarine warfare ==
From the early stages of the war the British had blockaded Germany, preventing neutral shipping from reaching German ports. By the time of the so-called "turnip winter" of 1916–17, the blockade had severely limited imports of food and fuel into Germany. Among the results were an increase in infant mortality and as many as 700,000 deaths attributed to starvation or hypothermia during the war. With the blockade having such dire consequences, Kaiser Wilhelm II personally approved a resumption of unrestricted submarine warfare to begin on 1 February 1917 to help force the British to make peace. The new rules of engagement specified that no ship was to be left afloat.

The first recorded action of U-70 under the new rules of engagement occurred near the end of February 1917, when the U-boat shelled the British-flagged SS San Patricio. The 9,712 GRT tanker, encountered by U-70 off the Orkney Islands, survived the attack. (Note: Although San Patricio survived two different U-boat attacks in 1917—U-70's gunfire attack on 27 February and a torpedo attack on 8 May by UC-65—she was torpedoed and sunk in March 1943 (as Southern Princess) by U-600 during World War II. See: Helgason, Guðmundur. "Ships hit during WWI: Southern Princess". German and Austrian U-boats of World War I - Kaiserliche Marine - Uboat.net.) In March, U-70 sank twelve ships totaling 25,708 GRT and damaged a thirteenth of 4,666 GRT.

During the month of April 1917, German U-boats succeeded in sinking 860,334 tons of Allied and neutral shipping, a total unsurpassed by any month in either of the two world wars. U-70's contribution came in the form of ten ships of 23,530 GRT sent to the bottom, four of them on the same day, 24 April.

Although the monthly total of tonnage sunk by all U-boats had peaked in April, the losses were over 600,000 tons in each of May and June. U-70 did not contribute to the May tally but her commanding officer, Wünsche, was awarded the House Order of Hohenzollern. U-70 began another productive month in June by sinking the American Line ocean liner Southland on 4 June. At 11,899 GRT, Southland was the largest ship sunk by U-70, and one of the largest ships sunk during the war by a U-boat. Southland was carrying a general cargo from Liverpool to Philadelphia when U-70 sank her at position 56°10′N 12°14′W, some 140 nautical miles (260 km; 160 mi) from Tory Island. Throughout the rest of June, U-70 sank another seven ships totaling 26,131 GRT.

After June 1917, U-70 only sank another two ships throughout the rest of the war, one of which was the British Flower-class sloop Rhododendron on 5 May 1918. Rhododendron had been constructed in 1917 as a purpose-built Q-ship, a warship disguised as a merchant ship to lure German submarines within range of their concealed gun batteries. The sloop was patrolling off Mull Head in the Orkney Islands when struck by a single torpedo from U-70. The captain, Lieutenant Commander Charles Arthur Peal, became disoriented in the aftermath of the explosion, and instead of ordering away a "panic party" to draw the submarine within range, ordered the complete evacuation of the ship, which was carried out in great haste and confusion. U-70 approached the burning ship and observed the chaotic evacuation, seizing a petty officer from a liferaft who revealed the ship's true identity. U-70 shelled the wreck and escaped without coming under fire. Rhododendron capsized and sank the following morning, with the loss of 15 men, four killed in the explosion and 11 drowned during the evacuation. Peal and the rest of the crew were heavily criticized for their conduct under fire by an Admiralty board.

In total U-70 sank 53 ships with a combined tonnage of 136,578 and damaged five with a tonnage of 24,971 in her twelve war patrols. She was surrendered to the British on 20 November 1918, nine days after the Armistice, and broken up at Bo'ness in 1919–20.

== Summary of raiding history ==
Ships sunk or damaged by SM U-70
Date	Name	Nationality	(Note: Merchant ship tonnages are in gross register tons. Military vessels are listed by tons displacement.) Tonnage	Fate
16 March 1916	Berwindvale	United Kingdom	5,242	Damaged
16 March 1916	Willie	United Kingdom	185	Sunk
17 March 1916	Lindfjeld	Norway	2,230	Sunk
22 March 1916	Bougainville	France	2,248	Sunk
24 March 1916	Fenay Bridge	United Kingdom	3,838	Sunk
25 March 1916	Duendes	United Kingdom	4,602	Damaged
28 March 1916	Eagle Point	United Kingdom	5,222	Sunk
2 April 1916	Arena	Norway	1,019	Sunk
17 December 1916	Pascal	United Kingdom	5,587	Sunk
18 December 1916	Eugene Gaston	France	184	Sunk
18 December 1916	Flimston	United Kingdom	5,751	Sunk
18 December 1916	Hirondelle	France	148	Sunk
22 December 1916	Avanti	Italy	1,673	Sunk
22 December 1916	Thyra	Norway	749	Damaged
24 December 1916	Harry W. Adams	United Kingdom	127	Sunk
26 December 1916	Spinaway	United Kingdom	95	Sunk
30 December 1916	Borre	Norway	741	Sunk
30 December 1916	Edda	Norway	1,138	Sunk
1 January 1917	Tsiropinas	Greece	3,015	Sunk
2 January 1917	Aconcagua	France	1,313	Sunk
2 January 1917	Odda	Norway	1,101	Sunk
2 January 1917	San Leandro	Spain	1,616	Sunk
4 January 1917	Ruby	Russia	949	Sunk
9 January 1917	Excellent	United Kingdom	1,944	Sunk
27 February 1917	San Patricio	United Kingdom	9,712	Damaged
3 March 1917	Kincardine	United Kingdom	4,108	Sunk
9 March 1917	Inverlogie	United Kingdom	2,347	Sunk
10 March 1917	Mediterranean	United Kingdom	105	Sunk
10 March 1917	T. Crowley	United Kingdom	97	Sunk
12 March 1917	Winnebago	United Kingdom	4,666	Damaged
13 March 1917	Alma	Russia	335	Sunk
13 March 1917	Elizabeth Eleanor	United Kingdom	169	Sunk
13 March 1917	Pera	Russia	1,737	Sunk
15 March 1917	Balaguier	France	2,293	Sunk
15 March 1917	Circe	France	4,133	Sunk
16 March 1917	Norma Pratt	United Kingdom	4,416	Sunk
16 March 1917	Vigilancia	United States	4,115	Sunk
18 March 1917	Joshua Nicholson	United Kingdom	1,853	Sunk
21 April 1917	Sebek	United Kingdom	4,601	Sunk
24 April 1917	Clan Galbraith	Norway	2,168	Sunk
24 April 1917	Eos	Denmark	179	Sunk
24 April 1917	Valkyrian	Sweden	233	Sunk
24 April 1917	Vestdal	Norway	1,690	Sunk
26 April 1917	Harflete	United Kingdom	4,814	Sunk
27 April 1917	Manchester Citizen	United Kingdom	4,251	Sunk
28 April 1917	Anne Marie	Norway	441	Sunk
29 April 1917	Daleby	United Kingdom	3,628	Sunk
30 April 1917	Delamere	United Kingdom	1,525	Sunk
4 June 1917	Southland	United Kingdom	11,899	Sunk
9 June 1917	Appledore	United Kingdom	3,843	Sunk
9 June 1917	Egyptiana	United Kingdom	3,818	Sunk
9 June 1917	Harbury	United Kingdom	4,572	Sunk
10 June 1917	Galicia	United Kingdom	1,400	Sunk
11 June 1917	City of Perth	United Kingdom	3,427	Sunk
18 June 1917	Queen Adelaide	United Kingdom	4,965	Sunk
19 June 1917	Buffalo	United Kingdom	4,106	Sunk
25 August 1917	Malda	United Kingdom	7,896	Sunk
5 May 1918	HMS Rhododendron	Royal Navy	1,290	Sunk
		Sunk: Damaged: Total:	136,578; 24,971; 161,549	

== Bibliography ==
- Gardiner, Robert, ed. (1985). Conway's All the World's Fighting Ships 1906–1921. Annapolis, Maryland: Naval Institute Press. ISBN 978-0-87021-907-8. OCLC 12119866.
- Gröner, Erich; Jung, Dieter; Maass, Martin (1991). U-boats and Mine Warfare Vessels. German Warships 1815–1945. Vol. 2. Translated by Thomas, Keith; Magowan, Rachel. London: Conway Maritime Press. ISBN 0-85177-593-4.
- Gibson, R. H.; Prendergast, Maurice (2003) [1931]. The German Submarine War, 1914–1918. Annapolis, Maryland: Naval Institute Press. ISBN 978-1-59114-314-7. OCLC 52924732.
- Hepper, David (2006). British Warship Losses in the Ironclad Era 1860–1919. London: Chatham Publishing. ISBN 978-1-86176-273-3. OCLC 237129318.
- Sieche, Erwin F. (1980). "Austro-Hungarian Submarines". Warship, Volume 2. Naval Institute Press. ISBN 978-0-87021-976-4. OCLC 233144055.
- Tarrant, V. E. (1989). The U-Boat Offensive: 1914–1945. Annapolis, Maryland: Naval Institute Press. ISBN 978-0-87021-764-7. OCLC 20338385.
- Tennent, A. J. (2006) [1990]. British Merchant Ships Sunk by U boats in the 1914–1918 War. Penzance: Periscope Publishing. ISBN 1-904381-36-7.
- Spindler, Arno (1966) [1932]. Der Handelskrieg mit U-Booten. 5 Vols. Berlin: Mittler & Sohn. Vols. 4+5, dealing with 1917+18, are very hard to find: Guildhall Library, London, has them all, also Vol. 1–3 in an English translation: The submarine war against commerce.
- Beesly, Patrick (1982). Room 40: British Naval Intelligence 1914–1918. London: H Hamilton. ISBN 978-0-241-10864-2.
- Halpern, Paul G. (1995). A Naval History of World War I. New York: Routledge. ISBN 978-1-85728-498-0.
- Roessler, Eberhard (1997). Die Unterseeboote der Kaiserlichen Marine. Bonn: Bernard & Graefe. ISBN 978-3-7637-5963-7.
- Schroeder, Joachim (2002). Die U-Boote des Kaisers. Bonn: Bernard & Graefe. ISBN 978-3-7637-6235-4.
- Koerver, Hans Joachim (2008). Room 40: German Naval Warfare 1914–1918. Vol I., The Fleet in Action. Steinbach: LIS Reinisch. ISBN 978-3-902433-76-3.
- Koerver, Hans Joachim (2009). Room 40: German Naval Warfare 1914–1918. Vol II., The Fleet in Being. Steinbach: LIS Reinisch. ISBN 978-3-902433-77-0.
