= SM UC-10 =

German minelayer submarine from World War I

History

German Empire
- Name: UC-10
- Ordered: 14 November 1914
- Builder: AG Vulcan, Hamburg
- Yard number: 54
- Launched: 15 July 1915
- Commissioned: 17 July 1915
- Fate: Sunk, 21 August 1916

General characteristics
- Class & type: Type UC I submarine
- Displacement: 168 t (165 long tons), surfaced; 183 t (180 long tons), submerged
- Length: 33.99 m (111 ft 6 in) o/a; 29.62 m (97 ft 2 in) pressure hull
- Beam: 3.15 m (10 ft 4 in)
- Draft: 3.04 m (10 ft)
- Propulsion: 1 × propeller shaft; 1 × 6-cylinder, 4-stroke diesel engine, 90 PS (66 kW; 89 bhp); 1 × electric motor, 175 PS (129 kW; 173 shp)
- Speed: 6.20 knots (11.48 km/h; 7.13 mph), surfaced; 5.22 knots (9.67 km/h; 6.01 mph), submerged
- Range: 780 nmi (1,440 km; 900 mi) at 5 knots (9.3 km/h; 5.8 mph) surfaced; 50 nmi (93 km; 58 mi) at 4 knots (7.4 km/h; 4.6 mph) submerged
- Test depth: 50 m (160 ft)
- Complement: 14
- Armament: 6 × 100 cm (39 in) mine tubes; 12 × UC 120 mines; 1 × 8 mm (0.31 in) machine gun

Service record
- Part of: Flandern Flotilla; 19 December 1915 – 21 August 1916
- Commanders: Oblt.z.S. Ernst Rosenow; 17 July – 3 November 1915; Oblt.z.S. Max Viebeg; 4 November – 8 December 1915; Oblt.z.S. Alfred Nitzsche; 9 December 1915 – 13 June 1916; Oblt.z.S. Reinhold Saltzwedel; 14 – 26 June 1916; Oblt.z.S. Werner Albrecht; 27 June – 21 August 1916
- Operations: 30 patrols
- Victories: 16 merchant ships sunk (30,406 GRT); 2 warships sunk (598 tons); 5 merchant ships damaged (16,627 GRT)

SM UC-10 was a German Type UC I minelayer submarine or U-boat in the German Imperial Navy (German: Kaiserliche Marine) during World War I. The U-boat was ordered on 14 November 1914 and was launched on 15 July 1915. She was commissioned into the German Imperial Navy on 17 July 1915 as SM UC-10. (Note: "SM" stands for "Seiner Majestät" (English: His Majesty's) and combined with the U for Unterseeboot would be translated as His Majesty's Submarine.) Mines laid by UC-10 in her 30 patrols were credited with sinking 18 ships. UC-10 was torpedoed and sunk on 21 August 1916 by British submarine HMS E54 at position 52°02′N 03°54′E.

== Design ==
A Type UC I submarine, UC-10 had a displacement of 168 tonnes (165 long tons) when at the surface and 183 tonnes (180 long tons) while submerged. She had a length overall of 33.99 m (111 ft 6 in), a beam of 3.15 m (10 ft 4 in), and a draught of 3.04 m (10 ft). The submarine was powered by one Daimler-Motoren-Gesellschaft six-cylinder, four-stroke diesel engine producing 90 metric horsepower (66 kW; 89 shp), an electric motor producing 175 metric horsepower (129 kW; 173 shp), and one propeller shaft. She was capable of operating at depths of up to 50 metres (160 ft).

The submarine had a maximum surface speed of 6.20 knots (11.48 km/h; 7.13 mph) and a maximum submerged speed of 5.22 knots (9.67 km/h; 6.01 mph). When submerged, she could operate for 50 nautical miles (93 km; 58 mi) at 4 knots (7.4 km/h; 4.6 mph); when surfaced, she could travel 780 nautical miles (1,440 km; 900 mi) at 5 knots (9.3 km/h; 5.8 mph). UC-10 was fitted with six 100 centimetres (39 in) mine tubes, twelve UC 120 mines, and one 8 millimetres (0.31 in) machine gun. She was built by AG Vulcan Stettin and her complement was fourteen crew members.

== Summary of raiding history ==
Date	Name	Nationality	Tonnage (Note: Merchant ship tonnages are in gross register tons. Military vessels are listed by tons displacement.)	Fate
30 December 1915	Ellewoutsdijk	Netherlands	2,229	Sunk
4 January 1916	Leto	Netherlands	3,225	Sunk
5 January 1916	Fridtjof Nansen	Norway	3,275	Sunk
21 January 1916	Apollo	Netherlands	799	Sunk
22 January 1916	Falls City	United Kingdom	4,729	Damaged
25 February 1916	Southford	United Kingdom	963	Sunk
26 February 1916	Birgit	Sweden	1,117	Sunk
29 February 1916	Malvina	United Kingdom	1,244	Damaged
7 March 1916	HMS Coquette	Royal Navy	335	Sunk
7 March 1916	HMS TB 11	Royal Navy	263	Sunk
11 March 1916	Zaandijk	Netherlands	4,189	Damaged
18 March 1916	Palembang	Netherlands	6,674	Sunk
3 April 1916	Ino	Norway	702	Sunk
26 April 1916	Dubhe	Netherlands	3,233	Damaged
26 April 1916	Noordzee	Netherlands	298	Sunk
1 May 1916	Hendon Hall	United Kingdom	3,994	Sunk
2 May 1916	Rochester City	United Kingdom	1,239	Sunk
22 May 1916	Rhenass	United Kingdom	285	Sunk
27 May 1916	Lincairn	United Kingdom	3,638	Sunk
1 June 1916	Parkgate	United Kingdom	3,232	Damaged
20 August 1916	Dragoon	United Kingdom	30	Sunk
3 September 1916	Rievaulx Abbey	United Kingdom	1,166	Sunk
11 December 1916	Nora	Denmark	772	Sunk
