= List of shipwrecks in March 1916 =

The list of shipwrecks in March 1916 includes ships sunk, foundered, grounded, or otherwise lost during March 1916.

== 1 March ==
List of shipwrecks: 1 March 1916
Ship	State	Description
Harold	United Kingdom	World War I: The fishing smack was scuttled in the North Sea 18 nautical miles (33 km) east of Lowestoft, Suffolk by SM UB-13 (Imperial German Navy). Her crew survived.
Kilbride	United Kingdom	World War I: The collier was shelled and sunk in the Mediterranean Sea (30 nautical miles (56 km) east of Galeta Island, Tunisia (37°40′N 9°31′E) by SM U-38 (Imperial German Navy). Her crew survived.
HMT Manx Queen	Royal Navy	The naval trawler was driven ashore and wrecked at Filey, Yorkshire.
Reliance	United Kingdom	World War I: The fishing smack was scuttled in the North Sea 25 nautical miles (46 km) east by south of Lowestoft by SM UB-13 (Imperial German Navy). Her crew survived.
Trevose	United Kingdom	World War I: The fishing smack was scuttled in the North Sea 18 nautical miles (33 km) east by north of Lowestoft by SM UB-13 (Imperial German Navy). Her crew survived.
Try On	United Kingdom	World War I: The fishing smack was scuttled in the North Sea 26 nautical miles (48 km) east by south of Lowestoft by SM UB-13 (Imperial German Navy). Her crew survived.

== 2 March ==
List of shipwrecks: 2 March 1916
Ship	State	Description
Bathampton	United Kingdom	The cargo ship was wrecked at Hambantota, Ceylon. Her crew were rescued.

== 3 March ==
List of shipwrecks: 3 March 1916
Ship	State	Description
HMT Boy Harold	Royal Navy	World War I: The naval trawler struck a mine placed by SM UC-12 (Imperial German Navy) and sank in the Adriatic Sea off Brindisi, Italy with the loss of seven of her crew.
Lyderhorn	Norway	The cargo ship collided with Leander (Norway) in the North Sea west of Bergen, Hordaland and sank.
Unknown barges	United States	Two barges went adrift in heavy seas when their tow line to Swatara (United States) parted off Boston. A heavy snowstorm then set in during which both sank. All four crew of one of the barges died, the crew of the other were rescued by the United States Coast Guard.

== 4 March ==
List of shipwrecks: 4 March 1916
Ship	State	Description
HMT Flicker	Royal Navy	World War I: The naval trawler struck a mine and sank in the English Channel off Dover, Kent with the loss of fourteen of her crew. by SM UC-6 (Imperial German Navy).
Teutonian	United Kingdom	World War I: The tanker was torpedoed and sunk in the Atlantic Ocean 36 nautical miles (67 km) south west by west of the Fastnet Rock (50°55′N 10°20′W) by SM U-32 (Imperial German Navy). Her crew survived.

== 5 March ==
List of shipwrecks: 5 March 1916
Ship	State	Description
Príncipe de Asturias	Spain	The ocean liner ran aground off Ilhabela, São Paulo, Brazil and sank with the loss of 445 of the 588 people on board.
Rothesay	United Kingdom	World War I: The cargo ship was torpedoed and sunk in the Atlantic Ocean 30 nautical miles (56 km) off the Bishop Rock, Isles of Scilly (49°31′N 7°22′W) by SM U-32 (Imperial German Navy). Her crew survived.

== 6 March ==
List of shipwrecks: 6 March 1916
Ship	State	Description
Cora A.	United States	The schooner was abandoned in the Atlantic Ocean (approximately 36°N 57°W).
Springflower	United Kingdom	World War I: The fishing smack was scuttled in the North Sea 18 nautical miles (33 km) east of Lowestoft, Suffolk by a Kaiserliche Marine submarine.
Trois Frères	France	World War I: The sailing vessel was sunk in the Bay of Biscay 50 nautical miles (93 km) west north west of Penmarc'h, Finistère by SM U-32 (Imperial German Navy).
Young Harry	United Kingdom	World War I: The fishing smack was scuttled in the North Sea 35 nautical miles (65 km) east of Lowestoft by a Kaiserliche Marine submarine.

== 7 March ==
List of shipwrecks: 7 March 1916
Ship	State	Description
HMS E5	Royal Navy	World War I: The E-class submarine struck a mine and sank in the North Sea off Juist, Lower Saxony, Germany.
HMS Coquette	Royal Navy	World War I: The D-class destroyer struck a mine placed by SM UC-10 (Imperial German Navy) and sank in the North Sea (51°45′N 1°30′E) with the loss of 22 of her crew.
HMS TB 11	Royal Navy	World War I: The torpedo boat struck a mine placed by SM UC-10 (Imperial German Navy) and sank in the North Sea (51°48′N 1°34′E) with the loss of 23 of her crew.
Ville de Havre	France	World War I: The four-masted barque was sunk in the Bay of Biscay off Brest, Finistère by SM U-32 (Imperial German Navy) with the loss of a crew member.

== 8 March ==
List of shipwrecks: 8 March 1916
Ship	State	Description
HMT Enterprise II	Royal Navy	World War I: The naval trawler struck a mine placed by SM UC-12 (Imperial German Navy) and sank in the Adriatic Sea off Brindisi, Italy with the loss of eight of her crew.
Harmatris	United Kingdom	World War I: The cargo ship was torpedoed and sunk in the English Channel off Boulogne, Pas-de-Calais, France by SM UB-18 (Imperial German Navy) with the loss of four of her crew.
Western	United States	The car float sank at Union Wharf in Boston, Massachusetts.

== 9 March ==
List of shipwrecks: 9 March 1916
Ship	State	Description
Ellen	Sweden	The schooner ran aground on the Ross Sands, Northumberland, United Kingdom. Her crew were rescued by the Lindisfarne Lifeboat.
HMS Fauvette	Royal Navy	World War I: The armed boarding steamer struck two mines placed by SM UC-7 (Imperial German Navy) and sank in the North Sea off North Foreland, Kent with the loss of fourteen of her crew. The wreck was dispersed post-war.
Louisiane	France	World War I: The passenger ship was torpedoed and sunk in the English Channel 3 nautical miles (5.6 km) off Cap de la Hève, Seine-Inférieure by SM UB-18 (Imperial German Navy) with the loss of a crew member.
Silius	Norway	World War I: The barque was torpedoed and sunk in the English Channel off Le Havre, Seine-Inférieure by SM UB-18 (Imperial German Navy) with the loss of three of her crew.
Lieutenant Pustshin	Imperial Russian Navy	World War I: The Boiki-class destroyer struck a mine and sank in the Black Sea south of Varna, Bulgaria. Fifteen crew were rescued.

== 11 March ==
List of shipwrecks: 11 March 1916
Ship	State	Description
Gertrude	United Kingdom	The Thames barge foundered in the River Medway at Rochester, Kent with the loss of a crew member.

== 12 March ==
List of shipwrecks: 12 March 1916
Ship	State	Description
HMY Mekong	Royal Navy	The naval yacht was lost on this date.
Seyyar	(Ottoman Empire) Ottoman Turkey	World War I: The banana boat was shelled and sunk in the Black Sea off Karasu by Russian warships.

== 13 March ==
List of shipwrecks: 12 March 1916
Ship	State	Description
Matatua	United Kingdom	After a fire and subsequent series of explosions, later attributed to its cargo of calcium carbide, she sunk pierside in Saint John, New Brunswick with the loss of her commander and designer, Captain L. B. Gilham. Refloated within four months.
Success	United States	The 33-foot (10 m) halibut-fishing vessel was wrecked on West Amatuli Island (58°56′N 152°03′W) in the Kodiak Archipelago. Two of her four crewmen were lost while transiting the coast of the island in a skiff. The other two survived.

== 14 March ==
List of shipwrecks: 14 March 1916
Ship	State	Description
Herman Winter	United States	The steamer burned and sank in the harbor at Portland, Maine. Raised, repaired and returned to service.

== 16 March ==
List of shipwrecks: 16 March 1916
Ship	State	Description
Alpha	United States	The fishing steamer swamped and sank near Rachel Island, Chatham Strait, British Columbia. Lost with five of six hands.
Ekonom	Russia	The schooner was abandoned in the Atlantic Ocean near the English Channel. The derelict was shelled, rammed and abandoned to sink by HMS Swiftsure (Royal Navy) 100 miles (160 km) north of Madeira on 5 July 1916.
Kanawha	United States	The cargo ship sprung leaks in a severe gale off Cape Hatteras on 15 March, sinking on 16 March off Charleston, South Carolina. One lifeboat swamped killing seven crew. 21 survivors rescued by Santa Maria (United States).
Lawson	Canada	The schooner ran on the rocks at the Bug light at the entrance to the harbor at Boston, Massachusetts. Refloated and returned to service.
Ottensen	Imperial German Navy	World War I: The minesweeper sank in the North Sea off Borkum after striking two mines and colliding with the minesweeper Niederwald (Imperial German Navy).
Tubantia	Netherlands	World War I: The ocean liner was torpedoed and sunk in the North Sea four nautical miles (7.4 km) off the Noord Hinder Lightship (Netherlands) (51°50′N 2°49′E) by SM UB-13 (Imperial German Navy). All 374 people on board were rescued by Breda, Krakatau (both Netherlands) and La Campine (Belgium).
SM UC-12	(Austria-Hungary) Imperial German Navy	World War I: The Type UC I submarine was sunk by the explosion of a mine whilst engaged in minelaying operations off Taranto, Italy. She was later raised by the Italians, repaired, and entered service as X-1.
Willie	United Kingdom	World War I: The sailing vessel was shelled and sunk in the Atlantic Ocean 60 nautical miles (110 km) north west by north of the Fastnet Rock by SM U-70 (Imperial German Navy). Her crew survived.

== 17 March ==
List of shipwrecks: 17 March 1916
Ship	State	Description
Lindfield	Norway	World War I: The barque was sunk in the Atlantic Ocean 70 nautical miles (130 km) southwest of the Fastnet Rock by SM U-70 (Imperial German Navy). Her crew survived.

== 18 March ==
List of shipwrecks: 18 March 1916
Ship	State	Description
HMT Ameer	Royal Navy	The naval trawler was lost on this date.
City of Midland	United Kingdom	The cargo ship was destroyed by fire at Toronto, Ontario.
Lowlands	United Kingdom	World War I: The cargo ship was torpedoed and sunk in the North Sea 8 nautical miles (15 km) north east by east of North Foreland, Kent by a Kaiserliche Marine submarine.
Palembang	Netherlands	World War I: The cargo ship struck a mine and sank in the North Sea (51°50′45″N 1°58′30″E).
Renaudin	French Navy	World War I: The Bisson-class destroyer was torpedoed and sunk in the Adriatic Sea off Durrës, Albania (41°17′N 19°22′E) by SM U-6 (Austro-Hungarian Navy).

== 19 March ==
List of shipwrecks: 19 March 1916
Ship	State	Description
Kanawha	United States	The cargo ship foundered in the Atlantic Ocean off Charleston, South Carolina with the loss of seven of her crew.
Nominoe	France	World War I: The cargo ship was torpedoed and sunk in the North Sea off Lowestoft, Suffolk, United Kingdom by SM UB-29 (Imperial German Navy).
Port Dalhousie	Canada	World War I: The cargo ship was torpedoed and sunk in the North Sea 2 nautical miles (3.7 km) off the Kentish Knock Lightship (United Kingdom) by SM UB-10 (Imperial German Navy) with the loss of nineteen of her crew.
HMT Valpa	Royal Navy	World War I: The 123.3-foot (37.6 m), 270-ton steam patrol naval trawler struck a mine placed by SM UC-7 (Imperial German Navy) and sank in the North Sea off Spurn Point, Yorkshire with the loss of four crew.

== 20 March ==
List of shipwrecks: 20 March 1916
Ship	State	Description
Ginette	French Navy	World War I: The naval trawler struck a mine placed by SM UC-14 (Imperial German Navy) and sank in the Ionian Sea off Corfu, Greece.
Langeli	Norway	World War I: The cargo ship was sunk in the North Sea 5 nautical miles (9.3 km) south south east of the Corton Lightship (United Kingdom) by SM UB-29 (Imperial German Navy) with the loss of a crew member.
Skodsborg	Denmark	World War I: The cargo ship was sunk in the North Sea 5 nautical miles (9.3 km) south south east of the Corton Lightship (United Kingdom) by SM UB-29 (Imperial German Navy) with the loss of three of her crew.

== 21 March ==
List of shipwrecks: 21 March 1916
Ship	State	Description
Aranmore	United Kingdom	World War I: The cargo ship was torpedoed and sunk in the Atlantic Ocean 24 nautical miles (44 km) off Eagle Island, County Mayo by SM U-43 (Imperial German Navy). Her crew survived.
HMS E24	Royal Navy	World War I: The E-class submarine was last reported in the Heligoland Bight on this date. Believed to have subsequently struck a mine and sank with the loss of all 30 crew.

== 22 March ==
List of shipwrecks: 22 March 1916
Ship	State	Description
Bougainville	France	World War I: The barque was shelled and sunk in the Irish Sea 6 nautical miles (11 km) south of the Coningsby Lightship (United Kingdom) (51°39′N 6°36′W) by SM U-70 (Imperial German Navy). Her crew survived.
Kelvinbank	United Kingdom	World War I: The cargo ship was torpedoed and sunk in the English Channel off Le Havre, Seine-Inférieure, France (49°27′N 000°03′E) by SM UB-18 (Imperial German Navy) with the loss of a crew member.
SM U-68	Imperial German Navy	World War I: The Type U 66 submarine was shelled, depth charged and sunk in the Atlantic Ocean (51°54′N 10°53′W) by HMS Farnborough (Royal Navy) and sank with the loss of all 38 crew.

== 23 March ==
List of shipwrecks: 23 March 1916
Ship	State	Description
HMT Corona	Royal Navy	World War I: The naval trawler struck a mine placed by SM UC-6 (Imperial German Navy) and sank in the North Sea off Ramsgate, Kent (51°08′50″N 1°25′00″E) with the loss of thirteen of her crew.
Kannik	Norway	World War I: The cargo ship was sunk in the English Channel off Le Havre, Seine-Inférieure (49°27′N 000°3′E) by SM UB-18 (Imperial German Navy). Her crew survived.
Minneapolis	United Kingdom	World War I: The ocean liner was torpedoed and damaged in the Mediterranean Sea 195 nautical miles (361 km) east of Malta (36°30′N 18°22′E) by SM U-35 (Imperial German Navy). She sank on 25 March with the loss of twelve lives (36°20′N 17°57′E).
Sea Serpent	United Kingdom	World War I: The coaster struck a mine placed by SM UC-6 (Imperial German Navy) and sank in the English Channel off Folkestone, Kent (51°01′50″N 1°11′30″E) with the loss of fourteen of her crew. One survivor rescued by HMT Erna (Royal Navy).

== 24 March ==
List of shipwrecks: 24 March 1916
Ship	State	Description
Christianssund	Denmark	World War I: The passenger ship struck a mine and sank in the English Channel 3 nautical miles (5.6 km) south west of Folkestone, Kent, United Kingdom (51°01′30″N 1°11′20″E). All on board survived.
Englishman	United Kingdom	World War I: The cargo ship was torpedoed and sunk in the Atlantic Ocean 30 nautical miles (56 km) north east of Malin Head, County Donegal by SM U-43 (Imperial German Navy) with the loss of ten crew.
Fenay Bridge	United Kingdom	World War I: The cargo ship was torpedoed and sunk in the Atlantic Ocean 54 nautical miles (100 km) west of the Bishop Rock, Isles of Scilly (49°32′N 7°43′W) by SM U-70 (Imperial German Navy). Her crew survived.
Fulmar	United Kingdom	World War I: The cargo ship struck a mine placed by SM UC-7 (Imperial German Navy) and sank southwest of Kentish Knock Lightvessel (United Kingdom) east of the Thames estuary 7 nautical miles (13 km) north east of North Foreland, Kent with the loss of the master.
HMY Marcella	Royal Navy	The naval yacht collided with another vessel and sank in The Downs.
Salybia	United Kingdom	World War I: The cargo ship was torpedoed and sunk in the English Channel 4 nautical miles (7.4 km) south west by west of Dungeness, Kent by SM UB-29 (Imperial German Navy). Her crew survived.
Sussex	France	Sussex World War I: The passenger ferry was torpedoed and damaged in the English Channel by SM UB-29 (Imperial German Navy) with the loss of at least 50 lives. She was beached at Boulogne, Pas-de-Calais. Sussex was repaired post-war and returned to service.

== 25 March ==
List of shipwrecks: 25 March 1916
Ship	State	Description
Braunschweig	Imperial German Navy	The Vorpostenboot was lost on this date.
Duiveland	Netherlands	World War I: The cargo ship struck a mine and sank in the English Channel (51°33′00″N 1°42′30″E).
HMT Grateful	Royal Navy	The naval trawler was wrecked at Torr Head, County Antrim. She was salvaged in 1917, repaired and sold into merchant service in 1918.
HMT Hilary II	Royal Navy	The naval trawler was lost on this date.
HMS Medusa	Royal Navy	World War I: The Medea-class destroyer collided with HMS Laverock (Royal Navy) in the North Sea whilst under attack by Luftstreitkrafte aircraft and sank. Her crew were rescued by HMS Laverock.
Ottomar	Russia	World War I: The sailing vessel was sunk in the Atlantic Ocean 40 to 45 nautical miles (74 to 83 km) south east of the Fastnet Rock by SM U-44 (Imperial German Navy).
SMS Otto Rudolf	Imperial German Navy	The Vorpostenboot was lost on this date.

== 26 March ==
List of shipwrecks: 26 March 1916
Ship	State	Description
Cerne	United Kingdom	World War I: The cargo ship struck a mine and sank in the Thames Estuary. Her 23 crew survived.
Ekonom	Russia	The schooner was abandoned in the English Channel off St. Michael's Mount, Cornwall, United Kingdom. Her crew were rescued by Westerdijk (Netherlands).
SMS G194	Imperial German Navy	World War I: The G192-class torpedo boat was rammed by HMS Cleopatra (Royal Navy) and sank in the North Sea off Tønder, Denmark.
Hebe	France	World War I: The cargo ship struck a mine and sank in the North Sea 6 nautical miles (11 km) east of the Sunk Lightship (United Kingdom) (51°53′00″N 1°46′30″E). Her eighteen crew survived.
Khartoum	United Kingdom	World War I: The fish carrier struck a mine placed by SM UC-5 (Imperial German Navy) and sank in the North Sea 6 nautical miles (11 km) north east of the Longstone Lightship (United Kingdom) with the loss of nine of her eleven crew.
Norne	Norway	World War I: The cargo ship was sunk in the Bay of Biscay (47°28′N 7°00′W by SM U-28 (Imperial German Navy). Her crew survived.
SMS S22	Imperial German Navy	World War I: The V1-class destroyer struck a mine and sank in the North Sea with the loss of 76 of her crew.
Saint Cecilia	United Kingdom	World War I: The cargo ship struck a mine and sank in the English Channel 3 nautical miles (5.6 km) south of Folkestone, Kent. Her crew survived.
Tabora	Germany	: World War I: The hospital ship, suspected by the Allies of being a disguised troopship and ammunition transport, was sunk in the harbor at Dar es Salaam, German East Africa, by the battleship HMS Vengeance (Royal Navy), the protected cruisers HMS Challenger and HMS Hyacinth (both Royal Navy), and the light cruiser HMAS Pioneer (Royal Australian Navy).

== 27 March ==
List of shipwrecks: 27 March 1916
Ship	State	Description
Empress of Midland	United Kingdom	World War I: The cargo ship struck a mine and sank in the North Sea 9 nautical miles (17 km) south of the Kentish Knock Lightship (United Kingdom) (51°31′N 1°43′E). Her crew survived.
Harriet	Denmark	World War I: The cargo ship struck a mine and sank in the North Sea 5 nautical miles (9.3 km) east of the Sunk Lightship (United Kingdom) (51°53′30″N 1°45′00″E). Her eighteen crew survived.
HMT Lerwick	Royal Navy	The naval trawler was lost on this date.
Manchester Engineer	United Kingdom	World War I: The cargo ship was torpedoed and sunk in the Irish Sea 20 nautical miles (37 km) west by south of the Coningbeg Lightship (United Kingdom) by SM U-44 (Imperial German Navy). Her crew survived.
SMS Volksdorf	Imperial German Navy	The Vorpostenboot was lost on this date.

== 28 March ==
List of shipwrecks: 28 March 1916
Ship	State	Description
Eagle Point	United Kingdom	World War I: The cargo ship was torpedoed and sunk in the Atlantic Ocean 100 nautical miles (190 km) west north west of the Bishop Rock, Isles of Scilly by SM U-70 (Imperial German Navy). Her crew survived.
Lavinia Westoll	United Kingdom	World War I: The cargo ship struck a mine and sank in the North Sea 33 nautical miles (61 km) south east by south of the Spurn Lightship (United Kingdom).
Olga	Russia	The schooner was driven ashore at The Mumbles, Glamorgan, United Kingdom. Her crew survived. Although later refloated, she was declared a constructive total loss and sold for scrap.
Rio Tiete	United Kingdom	World War I: The collier was torpedoed and sunk in the Bay of Biscay 140 nautical miles (260 km) west of Ouessant, Finistère, France (47°30′N 8°25′W) by SM U-28 (Imperial German Navy). Her crew survived.
HMT Saxon Prince	Royal Navy	The naval trawler foundered in the English Channel off Dover, Kent with the loss of all hands.

== 30 March ==
List of shipwrecks: 30 March 1916
Ship	State	Description
Bell	Norway	World War I: The four-masted barque was scuttled in the Atlantic Ocean off Ouessant, Finistère, France (48°55′N 7°40′W) by SM U-44 (Imperial German Navy). Her crew survived.
John Pritchard	United Kingdom	World War I: The schooner was scuttled in the Ionian Sea off Paxos, Greece (38°40′N 20°20′E) by SM U-4 (Austro-Hungarian Navy). Her crew survived.
Portugal	Imperial Russian Navy	Portugal World War I: The hospital ship was torpedoed and sunk in the Black Sea off Rizeh, Turkey (41°01′N 41°19′E) by SM U-33 (Imperial German Navy).
Trewyn	United Kingdom	World War I: The cargo ship was torpedoed and sunk in the Atlantic Ocean 80 nautical miles (150 km) west of Ouessant (47°30′N 7°30′W) by SM U-28 (Imperial German Navy) with the loss of 23 crew.
Saint Hubert	France	World War I: The barquentine was shelled and sunk in the Bay of Biscay (47°35′N 7°20′W) by SM U-28 (Imperial German Navy). Her crew were rescued by Livonia (United Kingdom).

== 31 March ==
List of shipwrecks: 31 March 1916
Ship	State	Description
Achilles	United Kingdom	World War I: The cargo ship was torpedoed and sunk in the Atlantic Ocean 90 nautical miles (170 km) west north west of Ouessant, Finistère, France by SM U-44 (Imperial German Navy) with the loss of five crew.
Alacrity	United Kingdom	World War I: The ship was torpedoed and sunk in the North Sea off Southwold, Suffolk by SM UB-13 (Imperial German Navy) with the loss of all fourteen crew.
Chiyo Maru	Japan	The cargo ship was wrecked on Lima Island south east of Hong Kong. She broke in two a few days later. Some salvage work was done.
Clinton	United Kingdom	World War I: The cargo ship struck a mine and was damaged in the North Sea 1.5 nautical miles (2.8 km) south east of Pakefield, Suffolk (52°26′N 1°49′E). She was beached but was later refloated, repaired and returned to service.
Egeo	Italy	World War I: The cargo ship was sunk in the Gulf of Taranto 20 nautical miles (37 km) off Punta Alice (39°39′N 17°18′E) by SM U-39 (Imperial German Navy). Her crew survived.
Goldmouth	United Kingdom	World War I: The tanker was torpedoed and sunk in the Atlantic Ocean 60 nautical miles (110 km) west north west of Ouessant by SM U-44 (Imperial German Navy). Her crew survived, but her captain was taken as a prisoner of war.
Hans Guide	Norway	World War I: The cargo ship was sunk on the Atlantic Ocean 55 nautical miles (102 km) west by north of Ouessant by SM U-44 (Imperial German Navy). Her crew survived.
Hollandia	Sweden	World War I: The cargo ship was torpedoed and sunk in the North Sea near the Galloper Lightship (United Kingdom) by SM UB-6 (Imperial German Navy). Her crew survived.
Memento	Norway	World War I: The cargo ship struck a mine placed by UC 5 (Imperial German Navy) and sank in the North Sea 1.5 nautical miles (2.8 km) south east of Pakefield (52°26′N 1°49′E) with the loss of a crew member.
Rangatira	United Kingdom	The liner ran aground on Robben Island, South Africa and was wrecked.
Riposto	Italy	World War I: The cargo ship was sunk in the Gulf of Taranto off Crotone (39°30′N 17°36′E) by SM U-39 (Imperial German Navy). Her crew survived.
Vigo	Spain	World War I: The cargo ship was sunk in the Atlantic Ocean 100 nautical miles (190 km) off Ouessant (47°10′N 7°54′W) by SM U-28 (Imperial German Navy).

== Unknown date ==
List of shipwrecks: Unknown date 1916
Ship	State	Description
Hermatrice	Royal Navy	World War I: The Q-ship was torpedoed and sunk in the English Channel by a Kaiserliche Marine submarine.
Linfield	Norway	World War I: The barque was shelled and sunk in the Atlantic Ocean by a German submarine. Her23 crew survived.
Spartan	United Kingdom	The schooner was driven ashore at Cockburnspath, Berwickshire and was wrecked. Her crew were rescued.
