= SM UC-15 =

German U-boat

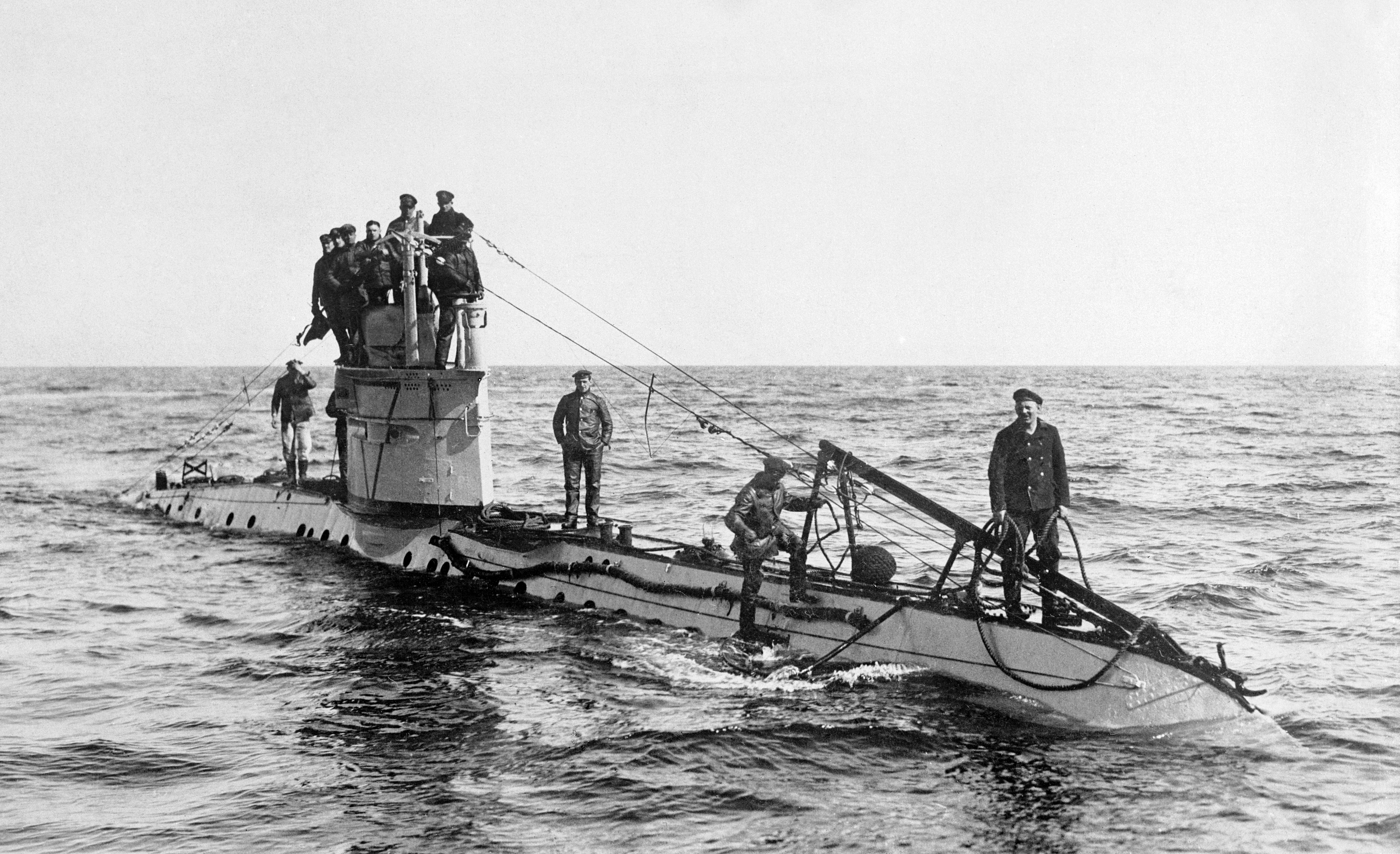
- German UC I-class submarine

History

German Empire
- Name: UC-15
- Ordered: 23 November 1914
- Builder: AG Weser, Bremen
- Yard number: 230
- Laid down: 28 January 1915
- Launched: 19 May 1915
- Commissioned: 28 June 1915
- Fate: Sunk November 1916

General characteristics
- Class & type: Type UC I submarine
- Displacement: 168 t (165 long tons), surfaced; 182 t (179 long tons), submerged
- Length: 33.99 m (111 ft 6 in) o/a; 29.62 m (97 ft 2 in) pressure hull
- Beam: 3.15 m (10 ft 4 in)
- Draft: 3.06 m (10 ft 0 in)
- Propulsion: 1 × propeller shaft; 1 × 6-cylinder, 4-stroke diesel engine, 80 bhp (60 kW); 1 × electric motor, 175 shp (130 kW)
- Speed: 6.49 knots (12.02 km/h; 7.47 mph), surfaced; 5.67 knots (10.50 km/h; 6.52 mph), submerged
- Range: 910 nmi (1,690 km; 1,050 mi) at 5 knots (9.3 km/h; 5.8 mph) surfaced; 50 nmi (93 km; 58 mi) at 4 knots (7.4 km/h; 4.6 mph) submerged
- Test depth: 50 m (160 ft)
- Complement: 14
- Armament: 6 × 100 cm (39 in) mine tubes; 12 × UC 120 mines; 1 × 8 mm (0.31 in) machine gun

Service record
- Part of: Constantinople Flotilla; 28 June 1915 – 30 November 1916
- Commanders: Oblt.z.S. Albrecht von Dewitz; 28 June 1915 – 20 June 1916; Oblt.z.S. Bruno Heller; 6 October – 30 November 1916
- Operations: 8 patrols
- Victories: 2 merchant ships sunk (874 GRT); 1 warship sunk (350 tons)

SM UC-15 was a German Type UC I minelayer submarine or U-boat in the German Imperial Navy (German: Kaiserliche Marine) during World War I. The U-boat was ordered on 23 November 1914, laid down on 28 January 1915, and was launched on 19 May 1915. She was commissioned into the German Imperial Navy on 28 June 1915 as SM UC-15. (Note: "SM" stands for "Seiner Majestät" (English: His Majesty's) and combined with the U for Unterseeboot would be translated as His Majesty's Submarine.) Mines laid by UC-15 during her eight patrols are credited with sinking three ships. UC-15 disappeared in November 1916.

== Design ==
A Type UC I submarine, UC-15 had a displacement of 168 tonnes (165 long tons) when at the surface and 182 tonnes (179 long tons) while submerged. She had a length overall of 33.99 m (111 ft 6 in), a beam of 3.15 m (10 ft 4 in), and a draught of 3.06 m (10 ft 0 in). The submarine was powered by one Benz six-cylinder, four-stroke diesel engine producing 80 metric horsepower (59 kW; 79 shp), an electric motor producing 175 metric horsepower (129 kW; 173 shp), and one propeller shaft. She was capable of operating at depths of up to 50 metres (160 ft).

The submarine had a maximum surface speed of 6.49 knots (12.02 km/h; 7.47 mph) and a maximum submerged speed of 5.67 knots (10.50 km/h; 6.52 mph). When submerged, she could operate for 50 nautical miles (93 km; 58 mi) at 4 knots (7.4 km/h; 4.6 mph); when surfaced, she could travel 910 nautical miles (1,690 km; 1,050 mi) at 5 knots (9.3 km/h; 5.8 mph). UC-15 was fitted with six 100-centimetre (39 in) naval mine tubes, twelve UC 120 mines, and one 8 millimetres (0.31 in) machine gun. She was built by AG Weser Bremen and her complement was fourteen crew members.

== Loss ==
After completion, UC-15 joined the Constantinople Flotilla and became the flotilla's only minelaying submarine in November 1915, after her sister ship UC-13 was accidentally grounded and subsequently destroyed by her crew. In November 1916, UC-15 was sent on a minelaying mission off the Romanian port of Sulina and never returned, being sunk by her own mines. This was probably caused by an encounter with the Romanian torpedo boat Smeul, whose captain surprised a German submarine near Sulina in November 1916, the latter reportedly never returning to her base at Varna. This could only be UC-15, whose systems most likely malfunctioned after being forced to submerge in the shallow waters, upon encountering the Romanian torpedo boat.

== Summary of raiding history ==
Date	Name	Nationality	Tonnage (Note: Merchant ship tonnages are in gross register tons. Military vessels are listed by tons displacement.)	Fate
25 April 1916	Zhivuchi	Imperial Russian Navy	350	Sunk
25 April 1916	Sv. Georgiy Pobedonsets	Russian Empire	112	Sunk
20 June 1916	Merkury	Russian Empire	762	Sunk
