= SM UC-7 =

German submarine

History

German Empire
- Name: UC-7
- Ordered: November 1914
- Builder: AG Vulcan, Hamburg
- Yard number: 51
- Launched: 6 July 1915
- Commissioned: 9 July 1915
- Fate: Missing since 5 July 1916; possibly sunk by a mine

General characteristics
- Class & type: Type UC I submarine
- Displacement: 168 t (165 long tons), surfaced; 183 t (180 long tons), submerged
- Length: 33.99 m (111 ft 6 in) o/a; 29.62 m (97 ft 2 in) pressure hull
- Beam: 3.15 m (10 ft 4 in)
- Draft: 3.04 m (10 ft)
- Propulsion: 1 × propeller shaft; 1 × 6-cylinder, 4-stroke diesel engine, 90 PS (66 kW; 89 bhp); 1 × electric motor, 175 PS (129 kW; 173 shp)
- Speed: 6.20 knots (11.48 km/h; 7.13 mph), surfaced; 5.22 knots (9.67 km/h; 6.01 mph), submerged
- Range: 780 nmi (1,440 km; 900 mi) at 5 knots (9.3 km/h; 5.8 mph) surfaced; 50 nmi (93 km; 58 mi) at 4 knots (7.4 km/h; 4.6 mph) submerged
- Test depth: 50 m (160 ft)
- Complement: 14
- Armament: 6 × 100 cm (39 in) mine tubes; 12 × UC 120 mines; 1 × 8 mm (0.31 in) machine gun

Service record
- Part of: Flandern Flotilla; 12 August 1915 – 5 July 1916
- Commanders: Oblt.z.S. Franz Wäger; 9 July – 29 November 1915; Oblt.z.S. Georg Haag; 30 November 1915 – 5 July 1916
- Operations: 34 patrols
- Victories: 19 merchant ships sunk (40,901 GRT); 1 warship sunk (3,520 tons); 12 auxiliary warships sunk (4,833 GRT); 2 merchant ships damaged (6,151 GRT)

SM UC-7 was a German Type UC I minelayer submarine or U-boat in the German Imperial Navy (German: Kaiserliche Marine) during World War I. The U-boat had been ordered by November 1914 and was launched on 6 July 1915. She was commissioned into the German Imperial Navy on 9 July 1915 as SM UC-7. (Note: "SM" stands for "Seiner Majestät" (English: His Majesty's) and combined with the U for Unterseeboot would be translated as His Majesty's Submarine.) Mines laid by UC-7 in her 34 patrols were credited with sinking 32 ships.

== Design ==
A Type UC I submarine, UC-7 had a displacement of 168 tonnes (165 long tons) when at the surface and 183 tonnes (180 long tons) while submerged. She had a length overall of 33.99 m (111 ft 6 in), a beam of 3.15 m (10 ft 4 in), and a draught of 3.04 m (10 ft). The submarine was powered by one Daimler-Motoren-Gesellschaft six-cylinder, four-stroke diesel engine producing 90 metric horsepower (66 kW; 89 shp), an electric motor producing 175 metric horsepower (129 kW; 173 shp), and one propeller shaft. She was capable of operating at a depth of 50 metres (160 ft).

The submarine had a maximum surface speed of 6.20 knots (11.48 km/h; 7.13 mph) and a maximum submerged speed of 5.22 knots (9.67 km/h; 6.01 mph). When submerged, she could operate for 50 nautical miles (93 km; 58 mi) at 4 knots (7.4 km/h; 4.6 mph); when surfaced, she could travel 780 nautical miles (1,440 km; 900 mi) at 5 knots (9.3 km/h; 5.8 mph). UC-7 was fitted with six 100 centimetres (39 in) mine tubes, twelve UC 120 mines, and one 8 millimetres (0.31 in) machine gun. She was built by AG Vulcan Stettin and her complement was fourteen crew members.

== Fate ==
UC-7 sailed from Zeebrugge on 3 July 1916 to lay mines off the English coast and failed to return. UB-12 sighted a submarine believed to be UC-7 on 5 July, west of the Bligh Bank, 46 km (29 mi) from Ostend. The submarine in question was reported to be on a course that would run it into a minefield, and Verschollen notes that the time and place would be correct if UC-7 were returning to base. The bodies of two crew members were later washed ashore on the coast of Flanders on 19 July. She was claimed that UC-7 was sunk by HMS Salmon on 7 July off Southwold, but this was doubted since the reported position was too far off UC-7's operating area.

== Summary of raiding history ==
Date	Name	Nationality	Tonnage (Note: Merchant ship tonnages are in gross register tons. Military vessels are listed by tons displacement.)	Fate
1 September 1915	HMT Malta	Royal Navy	138	Sunk
1 September 1915	HMT Nadine	Royal Navy	150	Sunk
1 September 1915	Savona	United Kingdom	1,180	Sunk
3 September 1915	Churston	United Kingdom	2,470	Sunk
22 September 1915	Koningin Emma	Netherlands	9,181	Sunk
26 September 1915	Vigilant	United Kingdom	69	Sunk
5 October 1915	Novocastrian	United Kingdom	1,151	Sunk
6 October 1915	Texelstroom	Netherlands	1,601	Sunk
28 November 1915	HMT William Morrison	Royal Navy	212	Sunk
8 December 1915	Ignis	United Kingdom	2,042	Sunk
10 December 1915	Ingstad	Norway	780	Sunk
21 December 1915	Knarsdale	United Kingdom	1,641	Sunk
31 December 1915	HMT Speeton	Royal Navy	205	Sunk
6 February 1916	Balgownie	United Kingdom	1,061	Sunk
8 February 1916	Elswick Manor	United Kingdom	3,943	Damaged
11 February 1916	HMS Arethusa	Royal Navy	3,520	Sunk
26 February 1916	Dido	United Kingdom	4,769	Sunk
27 February 1916	Mecklenburg	Netherlands	2,885	Sunk
9 March 1916	HMS Fauvette	Royal Navy	2,644	Sunk
18 March 1916	HMT Ameer	Royal Navy	216	Sunk
18 March 1916	Lowlands	United Kingdom	1,789	Sunk
19 March 1916	HMT Valpa	Royal Navy	230	Sunk
24 March 1916	Fulmar	United Kingdom	1,270	Sunk
25 March 1916	HMD Hilary II	Royal Navy	78	Sunk
26 March 1916	Cerne	United Kingdom	2,579	Sunk
2 April 1916	Bourbaki	France	2,208	Damaged
2 April 1916	HMT Commandant	Royal Navy	207	Sunk
9 April 1916	Avon	United Kingdom	1,574	Sunk
14 April 1916	HMT Alberta	Royal Navy	209	Sunk
14 April 1916	HMT Orcades	Royal Navy	270	Sunk
15 April 1916	Tusnastabb	Norway	859	Sunk
23 April 1916	HMT Lena Melling	Royal Navy	274	Sunk
10 May 1916	Dolcoath	United Kingdom	1,706	Sunk
18 June 1916	Seaconnet	United States	2,294	Sunk
