= SM UB-13 =

German Type UB I-class submarine

- Sections of UB-13 on board railroad flatcars for transport to Antwerp in early 1915

History

German Empire
- Name: UB-13
- Ordered: 15 October 1914
- Builder: AG Weser, Bremen
- Yard number: 222
- Laid down: 7 November 1914
- Launched: 8 March 1915
- Commissioned: 6 April 1915
- Fate: Sunk, 25 April 1916

General characteristics
- Class & type: Type UB I submarine
- Displacement: 127 t (125 long tons) surfaced; 141 t (139 long tons) submerged
- Length: 27.88 m (91 ft 6 in) (o/a)
- Beam: 3.15 m (10 ft 4 in)
- Draft: 3.03 m (9 ft 11 in)
- Propulsion: 1 × propeller shaft; 1 × Körting 4-cylinder diesel engine, 59 bhp (44 kW); 1 × Siemens-Schuckert electric motor, 119 shp (89 kW)
- Speed: 7.45 knots (13.80 km/h; 8.57 mph) surfaced; 6.24 knots (11.56 km/h; 7.18 mph) submerged
- Range: 1,500 nmi (2,800 km; 1,700 mi) at 5 knots (9.3 km/h; 5.8 mph) surfaced; 45 nmi (83 km; 52 mi) at 4 knots (7.4 km/h; 4.6 mph) submerged
- Test depth: 50 metres (160 ft)
- Complement: 14
- Armament: 2 × 45 cm (17.7 in) bow torpedo tubes; 2 × torpedoes; 1 × 8 mm (0.31 in) machine gun
- Notes: 33-second diving time

Service record
- Part of: Flanders Flotilla; 26 April 1915 – 24 April 1916
- Commanders: Oblt. Walter Gustav Becker; 6 April – 14 December 1915; Oblt. Karl Neumann; 15 December 1915 – 11 March 1916; Oblt. Arthur Metz; 12 March – 24 April 1916
- Operations: 36 patrols
- Victories: 11 merchant ships sunk (17,665 GRT); 1 merchant ship taken as prize (27 GRT)

SM UB-13 was a German Type UB I submarine or U-boat in the German Imperial Navy (German: Kaiserliche Marine) during World War I. The submarine was probably sunk by a British mine net in April 1916.

UB-13 was ordered in October 1914 and was laid down at the AG Weser shipyard in Bremen in November. UB-13 was a little under 28 metres (92 ft) in length and displaced between 127 and 141 tonnes (125 and 139 long tons), depending on whether surfaced or submerged. She carried two torpedoes for her two bow torpedo tubes and was also armed with a deck-mounted machine gun. UB-13 was broken into sections and shipped by rail to Antwerp for reassembly. She was launched in March 1915 and commissioned as SM UB-13 in April. (Note: "SM" stands for "Seiner Majestät" (English: His Majesty's) and combined with the U for Unterseeboot would be translated as His Majesty's Submarine.)

UB-13 spent her entire career in the Flanders Flotilla and sank 11 merchant ships, about half of them British fishing vessels. In March 1916, UB-13 was responsible for sinking the Dutch ocean liner Tubantia, raising the ire of the Dutch public. Tubantia was the largest neutral vessel sunk during the war and among the 30 largest ships sunk by U-boats. On 25 April 1916, UB-13 was sunk with all hands.

== Design and construction ==
After the German Army's rapid advance along the North Sea coast in the earliest stages of World War I, the German Imperial Navy found itself without suitable submarines that could be operated in the narrow and shallow seas off Flanders. Project 34, a design effort begun in mid-August 1914, produced the Type UB I design: a small submarine that could be shipped by rail to a port of operations and quickly assembled. Constrained by railroad size limitations, the UB I design called for a boat about 28 metres (92 ft) long and displacing about 125 tonnes (123 long tons) with two torpedo tubes. (Note: A further refinement of the design—replacing the torpedo tubes with mine chutes but changing little else—evolved into the Type UC I coastal minelaying submarine. See: Miller, p. 458.)

UB-13 was part of the initial allotment of seven submarines—numbered UB-9 to UB-15—ordered on 15 October from AG Weser of Bremen, just shy of two months after planning for the class began. UB-13 was laid down by Weser in Bremen on 7 November. As built, UB-13 was 27.88 metres (91 ft 6 in) long, 3.15 metres (10 ft 4 in) abeam, and had a draft of 3.03 metres (9 ft 11 in). She had a single 59-brake-horsepower (44 kW) Körting 4-cylinder diesel engine for surface travel, and a single 119-shaft-horsepower (89 kW) Siemens-Schuckert electric motor for underwater travel, both attached to a single propeller shaft. Her top speeds were 7.45 knots (13.80 km/h; 8.57 mph), surfaced, and 6.24 knots (11.56 km/h; 7.18 mph), submerged. At more moderate speeds, she could sail up to 1,500 nautical miles (2,800 km; 1,700 mi) on the surface before refueling, and up to 45 nautical miles (83 km; 52 mi) submerged before recharging her batteries. Like all boats of the class, UB-13 was rated to a diving depth of 50 metres (160 ft), and could completely submerge in 33 seconds.

UB-13 was armed with two 45-centimeter (17.7 in) torpedoes in two bow torpedo tubes. She was also outfitted for a single 8-millimeter (0.31 in) machine gun on deck. UB-13's standard complement consisted of one officer and thirteen enlisted men.

After work on UB-13 was complete at the Weser yard, she was readied for rail shipment. The process of shipping a UB I boat involved breaking the submarine down into what was essentially a knock down kit. Each boat was broken into approximately fifteen pieces and loaded onto eight railway flatcars. In February 1915, the sections of UB-13 were shipped to Antwerp for assembly in what was typically a two- to three-week process. After UB-13 was assembled and launched on 8 March, she was loaded on a barge and taken through canals to Bruges where she underwent trials.

== Early career ==
The submarine was commissioned into the German Imperial Navy as SM UB-13 on 6 April 1915 under the command of Oberleutnant zur See Walter Gustav Becker, a 29-year-old first-time U-boat commander. (Note: Becker was in the Navy's April 1905 cadet class with 36 other future U-boat captains, including Hermann von Fischel, Carl-Siegfried Ritter von Georg, Kurt Hartwig, and Hans von Mellenthin. See: Helgason, Guðmundur. "WWI Officer Crews: Crew 4/05". German and Austrian U-boats of World War I - Kaiserliche Marine - Uboat.net.) On 26 April, UB-13 joined the Flanders Flotilla (German: U-boote des Marinekorps U-Flotille Flandern), which had been organized on 29 March. When UB-13 joined the flotilla, Germany was in the midst of its first submarine offensive, begun in February. During this campaign, enemy vessels in the German-defined war zone (German: Kriegsgebiet), which encompassed all waters around the United Kingdom, were to be sunk. Vessels of neutral countries were not to be attacked unless they definitively could be identified as enemy vessels operating under a false flag.

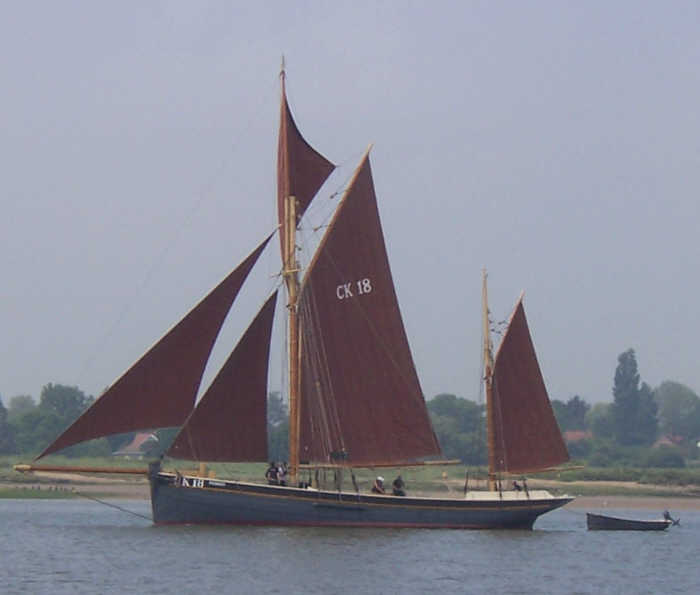
Seven of UB-13's victims were fishing smacks, traditionally outfitted with red ochre sails, like this contemporary smack.

Submarines of the Flanders Flotilla sank over 14,000 tons of merchant vessels in June 1915, and UB-13's first ship sunk, Dulcie, contributed almost one-seventh of that total. The British steamer Dulcie, listed at 2,033 gross register tons (GRT), was headed from Dunston for Le Havre with a load of coal when Becker torpedoed her 6 nautical miles (11 km; 6.9 mi) east of Aldeburgh. One man on Dulcie lost his life in the attack. Dulcie was the only ship sunk by UB-13 in June.

On 27 and 28 July, Becker and UB-13 sank three British fishing vessels while patrolling between 15 and 30 nautical miles (28 and 56 km; 17 and 35 mi) off Lowestoft. All three of the sunken ships were smacks—sailing vessels traditionally rigged with red ochre sails—which were stopped, boarded by crewmen from UB-16, and sunk with explosives.

In response to American demands after German submarines had sunk the Cunard Line steamer Lusitania in May 1915 and other high-profile sinkings in August and September, the chief of the Admiralstab, Admiral Henning von Holtzendorff, issued orders suspending the first offensive on 18 September. His directive ordered all U-boats out of the English Channel and the South-Western Approaches and required that all submarine activity in the North Sea be conducted strictly along prize regulations. On 20 February 1916, under the command of Kapitänleutnant Karl Neumann, who replaced Becker in December 1915, UB-13 captured a Belgian ship named Z10 David Marie and retained her as a prize. There are no further details about where Z10 David Marie was taken or her final disposition, but other ships captured as prizes by Flanders boats were sailed into Zeebrugge by prize crews.

== Second submarine offensive ==
By early 1916, the British blockade of Germany was beginning to have an effect on Germany and her imports. The Royal Navy had stopped and seized more cargo destined for Germany than the quantity of cargo sunk by German U-boats in the first submarine offensive. As a result, the German Imperial Navy began a second offensive against merchant shipping on 29 February. The final ground rules agreed upon by the German Admiralstab were that all enemy vessels in Germany's self-proclaimed war zone would be destroyed without warning, that enemy vessels outside the war zone would be destroyed only if armed, and—to avoid antagonizing the United States—that enemy passenger steamers were not to be attacked, regardless of whether in the war zone or not. The day after the beginning of the second offensive, Neumann and UB-13 sank four more fishing smacks northeast of Lowestoft. All four ships were boarded and sunk in the same manner as the three sunk the previous July. Shortly after, Neumann was transferred to command UB-2 in early March, (Note: Uboat.net reports Neumann in command of UB-13 until 11 March 1916, but also lists him in command of SM UB-2 from 8 March, a four-day overlap.) and was replaced by Oberleutnant zur See Arthur Metz, who had been in command of UB-17 for the preceding month.

=== SS Tubantia ===
Dutch artist Piet van der Hem's editorial cartoon decrying the sinking of Tubantia

Shortly after 02:30 on 16 March, a torpedo from UB-13 struck the starboard side of the neutral Dutch ocean liner Tubantia, which was at anchor near the North Hinder Lightship, about 50 nautical miles (93 km; 58 mi) off the Dutch coast. The Royal Holland Lloyd (Dutch: Koninklijke Hollandsche Lloyd) ship had been fully illuminated, with her name spelled out in electric lights between the twin funnels. Distress calls from Tubantia were heeded and all 80 passengers and 294 crew were rescued by three nearby ships before the ship foundered. Tubantia was the largest neutral ship sunk during the war, and among the 30 largest ships sunk by U-boats.

Germany initially tried to implicate British mines or torpedoes, but relented when confronted with evidence that it was one of their own torpedoes—which had been assigned to UB-13 (Note: Sources almost invariably report the submarine as U-boat 13 or U-13. UB-13 was the only extant U-boat numbered 13 in March 1916; U-13 and UC-13 had been lost in 1914 and 1915, respectively. See: Helgason, Guðmundur.Helgason, Guðmundur. "Ships hit during WWI: U 13". German and Austrian U-boats of World War I - Kaiserliche Marine - Uboat.net.,Helgason, Guðmundur. "Ships hit during WWI: UC 13". German and Austrian U-boats of World War I - Kaiserliche Marine - Uboat.net.. U-Boat War in World War I. Uboat.net. Retrieved on 17 March 2009.)—that had sunk Tubantia. The Germans, however, presented a forged log from UB-13 that showed her nowhere near Tubantia at the time of the attack. Further, they reported, UB-13 had fired that specific torpedo at a British warship on 6 March—ten days before Tubantia was sunk—which would have been under her previous commander, Kapitänleutnant Neumann. The U.S. Minister to the Netherlands, Henry van Dyke, writing in Fighting for Peace in 1917, called this explanation "amazing" and derided it:

This certain U-boat had fired this particular torpedo at a British war-vessel somewhere in the North Sea ten days before the Tubantia was sunk. The shot missed its mark. But the naughty undisciplined little torpedo went cruising around in the sea on its own hook for ten days waiting for a chance to kill somebody. Then the Tubantia came along and the wandering-Willy torpedo promptly, obstinately, ran into the ship and sank her. This was the explanation. Germany was not to blame.

The Dutch public was furious at what they believed a hostile German act, which caused German diplomats to spread rumors of an impending British invasion of the Netherlands to divert the unwanted attention. (Note: In 1922, four years after the war had ended an international committee found that Germany was responsible for sinking Tubantia and ordered them to pay Royal Holland Lloyd £830,000. See: Pickford, p. 214.)

Amidst all of the denials and diplomatic wrangling over Tubantia's sinking, UB-13 continued to sink ships. On 31 March, off Southwold, Metz and UB-13 sank the British steamer Alacrity. The 1,080 GRT ship was carrying ballast destined for Seaham Harbour when she went down with fourteen crewman. Twelve days later, in the Kentish Knock area, UB-13 sank the Danish ship Proeven. The 276 GRT sailing vessel was the last ship sunk by UB-13.

== Sinking ==
On the evening of 23 April 1916, UB-13 departed Zeebrugge for a patrol off the mouth of the Thames and was never heard from again. Author Dwight Messimer, in his book Verschollen: World War I U-boat Losses, reports that the British had deployed a new explosive anti-submarine net at position 51°33′N 2°45′E in the early morning hours of 24 April. He suggests that it was possible UB-13 had set off some of the contact mines on the net, or possible that the submarine had struck a mine in one of the many British minefields off the Flemish coast. However, according to authors R. H. Gibson and Maurice Prendergast, in their book The German Submarine War, 1914–1918, UB-13 fouled the anchor cable of the British naval drifter Gleaner of the Sea on 24 April, and was depth charged by E.E.S.. Then for good measure, the British destroyer Afridi deployed explosive sweeps against the submarine. Whatever the specific cause of her demise, all seventeen crewmen on board the submarine were killed.

== Summary of raiding history ==
Ships sunk or damaged by SM UB-13
Date	Name	Nationality	Tonnage	Fate
19 June 1915	Dulcie	United Kingdom	2,033	Sunk
27 July 1915	Iceni	United Kingdom	57	Sunk
27 July 1915	Salacia	United Kingdom	61	Sunk
28 July 1915	Young Percy	United Kingdom	45	Sunk
20 February 1916	David Marie	Belgium	27	Captured as prize
1 March 1916	Harold	United Kingdom	56	Sunk
1 March 1916	Reliance	United Kingdom	54	Sunk
1 March 1916	Trevose	United Kingdom	46	Sunk
1 March 1916	Try On	United Kingdom	46	Sunk
16 March 1916	Tubantia	Netherlands	13,911	Sunk
31 March 1916	Alacrity	United Kingdom	1,080	Sunk
11 April 1916	Proeven	Denmark	276	Sunk
		Total:	17,692	

== Bibliography ==
- Bendert, Harald (2000). Die UB-Boote der Kaiserlichen Marine, 1914-1918. Einsätze, Erfolge, Schicksal (in German). Hamburg: Verlag E.S. Mittler & Sohn GmbH. ISBN 3-8132-0713-7.
- Gröner, Erich; Jung, Dieter; Maass, Martin (1991). U-boats and Mine Warfare Vessels. German Warships 1815–1945. Vol. 2. Translated by Thomas, Keith; Magowan, Rachel. London: Conway Maritime Press. ISBN 0-85177-593-4.
- Gardiner, Robert; Gray, Randal, eds. (1985). Conway's All the World's Fighting Ships 1906–1921. Annapolis, Maryland: Naval Institute Press. ISBN 978-0-87021-907-8. OCLC 12119866.
- Gibson, R. H.; Maurice Prendergast (2003) [1931]. The German Submarine War, 1914–1918. Annapolis, Maryland: Naval Institute Press. ISBN 9781591143147. OCLC 52924732.
- Grant, Robert M. (2003). U-boat Hunters: Code Breakers, Divers and the Defeat of the U-boats, 1914–1918. Annapolis, Maryland: Naval Institute Press. ISBN 978-1-59114-889-0. OCLC 54688427.
- Karau, Mark D. (2003). Wielding the Dagger: the MarineKorps Flandern and the German War Effort, 1914–1918. Westport, Connecticut: Praeger. ISBN 978-0-313-32475-8. OCLC 51204317.
- Messimer, Dwight R. (2002). Verschollen: World War I U-boat Losses. Annapolis, Maryland: Naval Institute Press. ISBN 978-1-55750-475-3. OCLC 231973419.
- Miller, David (2002). The Illustrated Directory of Submarines of the World. St. Paul, Minnesota: MBI Pub. Co. ISBN 978-0-7603-1345-9. OCLC 50208951.
- Pickford, Nigel (2006). Lost Treasure Ships of the Northern Seas: A Guide and Gazetteer to 2000 Years of Shipwreck. London: Chatham. ISBN 978-1-86176-250-4. OCLC 67375472.
- Tarrant, V. E. (1989). The U-Boat Offensive: 1914–1945. Annapolis, Maryland: Naval Institute Press. ISBN 978-0-87021-764-7. OCLC 20338385.
- van Dyke, Henry (1921). The works of Henry Van Dyke (Avalon ed.). New York: Charles Scribner's Sons. ISBN 0-665-81693-6. OCLC 9473678.
- van Tuyll van Serooskerken, Hubert P. (2001). The Netherlands and World War I: Espionage, Diplomacy and Survival. Leiden: Brill. ISBN 978-90-04-12243-7. OCLC 48081143.
- Williamson, Gordon (2002). U-boats of the Kaiser's Navy. Oxford: Osprey. ISBN 978-1-84176-362-0. OCLC 48627495.
