= Clan Galbraith (ship) =

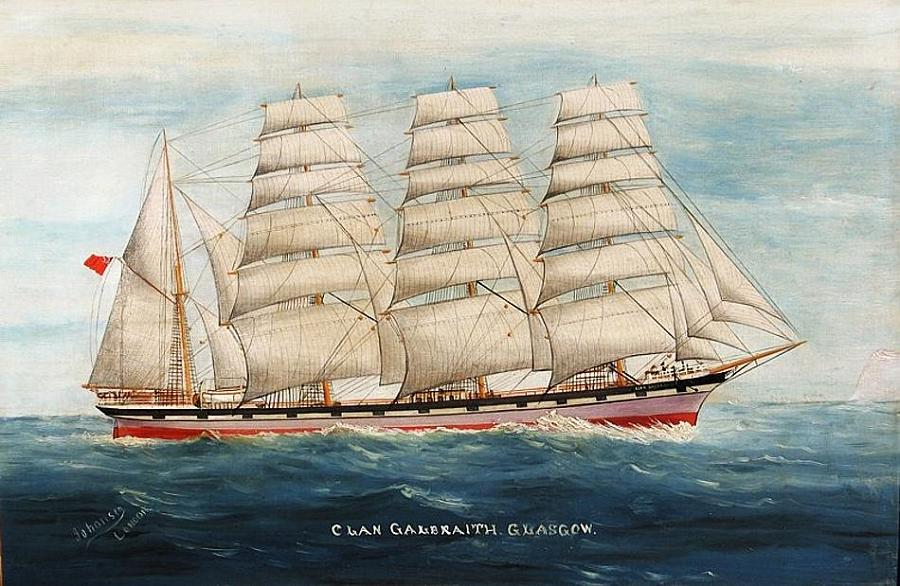
- Painting of Clan Galbraith by Georg Johansen

History
- Name: Clan Galbraith
- Namesake: Clan Galbraith
- Owner: Thomas Dunlop & Sons (Queen Line); 1910 A/S Clan Galbraith (Carl Bech & Co.), Tvedestrand, Norway; 1916 Bech's Rederi A/S (Carl Bech & Co.), Tvedestrand
- Builder: Russell & Co, Port Glasgow
- Yard number: 347
- Launched: 1 February 1894
- Fate: Sunk 24 April 1917

General characteristics
- Type: Steel barque
- Tonnage: 2,149 GRT; 1,983 NRT
- Length: 282.9 ft (86.2 m)
- Beam: 40.4 ft (12.3 m)
- Depth: 24.6 ft (7.5 m)
- Propulsion: Sail 4 masts

Clan Galbraith was a steel barque built in Port Glasgow, Scotland, in 1894 for trade with Calcutta.

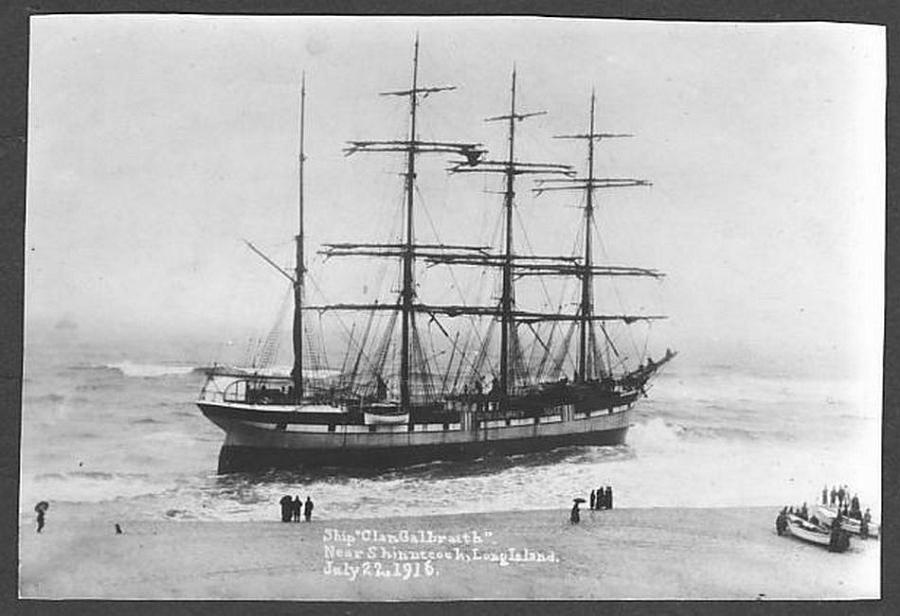
Clan Galbraith aground on Long Island

On 22 July 1916, returning in ballast from Bristol, England after delivering oil there, Clan Galbraith ran aground at Flying Point beach, near Bridgehampton, New York, while attempting to find her way to the Ambrose Channel lightship in a heavy fog. The ship grounded about 200 feet off shore, eventually being deposited by the rising tide 50 feet (15 m) offshore and in only 3 feet (0.91 m) of water. Her distress signals were responded to by life savers from the communities of Bridgehampton and Southampton. A breeches buoy was put up by the life savers for the safety, in the event of a storm, of those crew members who, along with Captain A. E. Olson, elected to stay aboard. The United States Coast Guard cutter Mohawk, as well as two wrecking tugs, was sent to aid the stricken vessel.

Among the crowds that gathered to view the shipwreck was Republican presidential candidate Charles Evans Hughes, along with his family.

In World War I Clan Galbraith was stopped and scuttled off the coast of Ireland by the German submarine SM U-70 while sailing from Philadelphia, Pennsylvania, to Birkenhead with a cargo of lubricating oil and wax. There were no casualties.
