= List of shipwrecks in April 1916 =

The list of shipwrecks in April 1916 includes ships sunk, foundered, grounded, or otherwise lost during April 1916.

== 1 April ==
List of shipwrecks: 1 April 1916
Ship	State	Description
Ashburton	United Kingdom	World War I: The cargo ship was torpedoed and sunk in the Atlantic Ocean 80 nautical miles (150 km) west north west of Ouessant, Finistère, France by SM U-44 (Imperial German Navy). Her crew survived.
Bengairn	United Kingdom	World War I: The four-masted barque was shelled and sunk in the Atlantic Ocean 165 nautical miles (306 km) south west of the Fastnet Rock by SM U-28 (Imperial German Navy). Her 26 crew survived.
Perth	United Kingdom	World War I: The coaster was torpedoed and sunk in the North Sea 1 nautical mile (1.9 km) south east by east of the Cross Sand Lightship (United Kingdom) by a Kaiserliche Marine submarine with the loss of six of her crew.
Peter Hamre	Norway	World War I: The cargo ship was torpedoed and sunk in the North Sea 2 nautical miles (3.7 km) off the Kentish Knock Lightship by SM UB-10 (Imperial German Navy) with the loss of fourteen of her crew.

== 2 April ==
List of shipwrecks: 2 April 1916
Ship	State	Description
Anniel E. Larder	United Kingdom	The schooner was abandoned in the Atlantic Ocean. Her crew survived.
Arena	Norway	World War I: The cargo ship was sunk in the North Sea (57°29′N 5°26′E) by SM U-70 (Imperial German Navy). Her crew survived.
HMT Commandant	Royal Navy	The naval trawler was lost on this date.
Simla	United Kingdom	World War I: The passenger ship was torpedoed and sunk in the Mediterranean Sea 45 nautical miles (83 km) north west of Gozo, Malta (36°25′N 13°12′E) by SM U-39 (Imperial German Navy) with the loss of ten crew.

== 3 April ==
List of shipwrecks: 3 April 1916
Ship	State	Description
Clan Campbell	United Kingdom	World War I: The cargo ship was torpedoed and sunk in the Mediterranean Sea 29 nautical miles (54 km) south east of Cape Bon, Tunisia (36°47′N 11°33′E) by SM U-39 (Imperial German Navy). Her crew survived.
Ellaston	United Kingdom	World War I: The cargo ship was torpedoed and sunk in the Mediterranean Sea 65 nautical miles (120 km) north west by west of Cape Serrat, Tunisia (37°41′N 7°59′E) by SM U-34 (Imperial German Navy). Her crew survived.
Enrichetta	Imperial Russian Navy	World War I: The auxiliary minesweeper was shelled and damaged in the Black Sea west of Lazistan by SM U-33 (Imperial German Navy). She became a total loss by 16 April.
Giuseppe Padre	Italy	World War I: The brigantine was sunk in the Strait of Sicily (36°55′N 11°20′E) by SM U-39 (Imperial German Navy).
Ino	Norway	World War I: The coaster struck a mine and sank in the North Sea 10 nautical miles (19 km) south of the Kentish Knock Lightship (United Kingdom) (51°28′40″N 1°35′20″E). Her crew survived.
HMT Pecheur	Royal Navy	The naval trawler collided with another vessel and sank in the Irish Sea off the Smalls Lighthouse.
Sneaton	United Kingdom	World War I: The collier was scuttled in the Mediterranean Sea 35 nautical miles (65 km) north north east of Cape de la Garde, Algeria by SM U-34 (Imperial German Navy). Her crew survived.

== 4 April ==
List of shipwrecks: 4 April 1916
Ship	State	Description
Bendew	United Kingdom	World War I: The cargo ship struck a mine placed by SM UC-1 (Imperial German Navy) and sank in the Thames Estuary 9 nautical miles (17 km) south of the Kentish Knock Lightship (United Kingdom) (51°30′N 1°37′E) with the loss of a crew member.
Maria Carmella Findari	Italy	World War I: The sailing vessel was sunk in the Strait of Sicily by SM U-39 (Imperial German Navy).

== 5 April ==
List of shipwrecks: 5 April 1916
Ship	State	Description
Baus	Norway	World War I: The cargo ship was sunk in the English Channel 15 nautical miles (28 km) west north west of Cap de la Hève, Seine-Inférieure, France by SM UB-18 (Imperial German Navy) with the loss of four of her crew. Survivors were rescued by a French fishing vessel.
Chantala	United Kingdom	World War I: The cargo ship was torpedoed and sunk in the Mediterranean Sea 15 nautical miles (28 km) north of Cape Bengut Algeria (37°12′N 3°48′E) by SM U-34 (Imperial German Navy) with the loss of nine crew.
Jeanette	France	World War I: The lugger was sunk in the English Channel 12 nautical miles (22 km) off St. Catherine's Point, Isle of Wight, United Kingdom by SM UB-18 (Imperial German Navy).
SM UB-26	Imperial German Navy	World War I: The Type UB II submarine was trapped in anti-submarine nets and was scuttled. Subsequently salvaged by the French, repaired and entered French Navy service at Roland Morillot.
Zent	United Kingdom	World War I: The refrigerated cargo ship was torpedoed and sunk in the Atlantic Ocean 28 nautical miles (52 km) west by south of the Fastnet Rock by SM U-66 (Imperial German Navy) with the loss of 49 crew.

== 6 April ==
List of shipwrecks: 6 April 1916
Ship	State	Description
Asger Ryg	Denmark	World War I: The cargo ship was sunk in the English Channel west of Beachy Head, Sussex, United Kingdom by SM UB-29 (Imperial German Navy) with the loss of all fifteen crew.
Beicos	Belgium	The cargo ship foundered in the Black Sea.
Binicaise	France	World War I: The schooner was sunk in the English Channel (50°20′N 7°00′W) by SM U-66 (Imperial German Navy).
Stjerneborg	Denmark	World War I: The cargo ship was shelled and sunk in the Mediterranean Sea south of Sardinia, Italy (38°45′N 9°15′E) by SM U-39 (Imperial German Navy). Her crew were rescued by a Regia Marina warship.
Vesuvio	United Kingdom	World War I: The cargo ship was torpedoed and sunk in the English Channel 6 nautical miles (11 km) east of the Owers Lightship (United Kingdom) (50°38′30″N 0°31′30″E) by SM UB-29 (Imperial German Navy) with the loss of seven of her crew.
Yonne	United Kingdom	World War I: The cargo ship was torpedoed and sunk in the Mediterranean Sea 18 nautical miles (33 km) north north west of Cape Cherchell, Algeria by SM U-34 (Imperial German Navy). Her crew survived.

== 7 April ==
List of shipwrecks: 7 April 1916
Ship	State	Description
Braunton	United Kingdom	World War I: The cargo ship was torpedoed and sunk in the English Channel 4.5 nautical miles (8.3 km) south by west of Beachy Head, Sussex (50°39′N 1°11′E) by SM UB-29 (Imperial German Navy). Her crew survived.
Clyde	United Kingdom	World War I: The brig was scuttled in the English Channel 32 nautical miles (59 km) north of Dieppe, Seine-Inférieure, France by SM UB-18 (Imperial German Navy). Her crew survived.
Eemdijk	Netherlands	World War I: The cargo ship was torpedoed and damaged in the English Channel 5 nautical miles (9.3 km) south south west of St. Catherine's Point, Isle of Wight, United Kingdom (50°30′N 1°19′W) by SM UB-18 (Imperial German Navy). She was beached but was later refloated, repaired and returned to service.
Halcyon	United Kingdom	World War I: The cargo ship struck a mine and sank in the English Channel 3.5 nautical miles (6.5 km) south west by south of Folkestone, Kent (51°01′N 1°10′E). Her crew survived.
Marguerite	France	World War I: The sailing vessel was sunk in the English Channel 25 nautical miles (46 km) north of Cap de la Hève, Seine Maritime by SM UB-29 (Imperial German Navy).
Rijndijk	Netherlands	World War I: The cargo ship was torpedoed and damaged in the Atlantic Ocean 20 nautical miles (37 km) west north west of the Bishop Rock, Isles of Scilly United Kingdom by SM U-66 (Imperial German Navy). She was beached but was later refloated.
Sainte Marie	France	World War I The barquentine was shelled and sunk in the Atlantic Ocean 30 nautical miles (56 km) west of the Isles of Scilly, United Kingdom (49°45′N 7°10′W) by SM U-66 (Imperial German Navy).

== 8 April ==
List of shipwrecks: 8 April 1916
Ship	State	Description
HMS Adamton	Royal Navy	World War I: The collier was shelled and sunk in the Atlantic Ocean 15 nautical miles (28 km) north of Skerryvore (56°32′N 7°26′W) by SM U-22 (Imperial German Navy) with the loss of a crew member.
Moss Rose	United Kingdom	The tug foundered at Barry, Glamorgan. Her crew were rescued.
Sal'dagan	Russia	World War I: The sailing vessel was sunk in the Black Sea (44°52′N 32°40′E) by SM UB-7 (Imperial German Navy). Her crew survived.
Santanderino	Spain	World War I: The cargo ship was sunk in the Atlantic Ocean 18 nautical miles (33 km) off Ouessant, Finistère, France (48°20′N 5°33′W) by SM U-66 (Imperial German Navy) with the loss of four of her twenty crew. Survivors were rescued by a Norwegian merchant ship.
Zafra	United Kingdom	World War I: The collier was scuttled in the Mediterranean Sea 44 nautical miles (81 km) north of Oran, Algeria (36°26′N 1°00′E) by SM U-34 (Imperial German Navy). Her crew survived.

== 9 April ==
List of shipwrecks: 9 April 1916
Ship	State	Description
Avon	United Kingdom	World War I: The cargo ship struck a mine and sank in the North Sea 2.5 nautical miles (4.6 km) south east by east of the Tongue Lightship (United Kingdom) with the loss of two of her crew.
Caledonia	Denmark	World War I: The cargo ship was sunk in the Mediterranean Sea 23 nautical miles (43 km) south south east of the Le Titan Lighthouse, Île du Levant, Var, France (42°34′N 6°44′E) by SM U-39 (Imperial German Navy). Her crew survived.
Eastern City	United Kingdom	World War I: The cargo ship was shelled and sunk in the Atlantic Ocean 18 nautical miles (33 km) north by west of Ouessant, Finistère, France by SM U-66 (Imperial German Navy). Her crew survived.
Glenalmond	United Kingdom	World War I: The cargo ship was torpedoed and sunk in the Atlantic Ocean 27 nautical miles (50 km) north of Ouessant by SM U-66 (Imperial German Navy). Her crew survived.
Gryoz	Russia	World War I: The sailing vessel was sunk in the Black Sea by SM UB-7 (Imperial German Navy). Her crew survived.
Sjolyst	Norway	World War I: The coaster was sunk in the Atlantic Ocean 25 nautical miles (46 km) north of Ouessant by SM U-66 (Imperial German Navy). Her crew survived.

== 10 April ==
List of shipwrecks: 10 April 1916
Ship	State	Description
Dorthea	Denmark	World War I: The cargo ship struck a mine and sank in the North Sea (55°45′N 3°30′E). Her crew were rescued by a Dutch trawler.
Silksworth	United Kingdom	World War I: The cargo ship was torpedoed and sunk in the North Sea 1.25 nautical miles (2.32 km) off the Corton Lightship (United Kingdom) by SM UB-12 (Imperial German Navy) with the loss of three of her crew.

== 11 April ==
List of shipwrecks: 11 April 1916
Ship	State	Description
Angus	United Kingdom	World War I: The cargo ship was shelled and sunk in the Mediterranean Sea 76 nautical miles (141 km) east by north of Valencia, Spain (39°57′N 1°08′E) by SM U-34 (Imperial German Navy). Her crew survived.
Inverlyon	United Kingdom	World War I: The barque was shelled and sunk in the Atlantic Ocean 108 nautical miles (200 km) west north west of the Fastnet Rock by SM U-73 (Imperial German Navy). Her crew survived.
Margam Abbey	United Kingdom	World War I: The collier was shelled and sunk in the Atlantic Ocean 55 nautical miles (102 km) south west of The Lizard, Cornwall by SM U-66 (Imperial German Navy). Her crew survived.
Robert Adamson	United Kingdom	World War I: The cargo ship was torpedoed and sunk in the North Sea. Her 29 crew were rescued.
Unione	Italy	World War I: The cargo ship was torpedoed and sunk in the Atlantic Ocean off Land's End, Cornwall by SM U-66 (Imperial German Navy). Her crew were rescued by a French Navy destroyer and a Royal Navy patrol vessel.
Murjek	Sweden	World War I: The cargo ship, en route from Philadelphia to Narvik, struck a mine 13 nautical miles north of Cape Wrath and sank immediately. One casualty.

== 12 April ==
List of shipwrecks: 12 April 1916
Ship	State	Description
Orlock Head	United Kingdom	World War I: The cargo ship was shelled and sunk in the Mediterranean Sea 65 nautical miles (120 km) south east of Barcelona, Spain (40°40′N 2°32′E) by SM U-34 (Imperial German Navy). Her crew survived.
Prøven	Denmark	World War I: The schooner was sunk in the North Sea 22 nautical miles (41 km) north of the Smith's Knoll Lightship (United Kingdom) by SM UB-13 (Imperial German Navy). Her crew survived.
Vega	France	World War I: The cargo ship was sunk in the Mediterranean Sea 80 nautical miles (150 km) east of Barcelona (40°42′N 2°09′E) by SM U-34 (Imperial German Navy). Her 33 crew were rescued by Jaime II (Spain).

== 13 April ==
List of shipwrecks: 13 April 1916
Ship	State	Description
Chic	United Kingdom	World War I: The cargo ship was torpedoed and sunk in the Atlantic Ocean 45 nautical miles (83 km) south west of the Fastnet Rock by SM U-22 (Imperial German Navy) with the loss of nine crew.
Lipari	Italy	World War I: The cargo ship was shelled and sunk in the Mediterranean Sea 36 nautical miles (67 km) off Cape Spartivento, Calabria (36°00′N 16°49′E) by SM U-39 (Imperial German Navy). Her crew survived.

== 14 April ==
List of shipwrecks: 14 April 1916
Ship	State	Description
HMT Alberta	Royal Navy	World War I: The naval trawler struck a mine placed by SM UC-7 (Imperial German Navy) and sank in the North Sea off Grimsby, Lincolnshire.
HMT Orcades	Royal Navy	The naval trawler was lost on this date.
Shenandoah	United Kingdom	World War I: The cargo ship struck a mine placed by SM UC-6 (Imperial German Navy) and sank in the English Channel 1.5 nautical miles (2.8 km) west of Folkestone, Kent (51°01′40″N 1°12′30″E) with the loss of two of her crew.

== 15 April ==
List of shipwrecks: 15 April 1916
Ship	State	Description
Fairport	United Kingdom	World War I: The cargo ship was torpedoed and sunk in the Atlantic Ocean 31 nautical miles (57 km) north by west of the Bishop Rock, Isles of Scilly (50°18′N 6°52′W) by SM U-69 (Imperial German Navy). Her crew survived.
Schwanden	Russia	World War I: The barque was scuttled in the Atlantic Ocean by SM U-69 (Imperial German Navy) at approximately the same position as Fairport (United Kingdom).

== 16 April ==
List of shipwrecks: 16 April 1916
Ship	State	Description
Cardonia	United Kingdom	World War I: The full-rigged ship was torpedoed and sunk in the Atlantic Ocean 20 nautical miles (37 km) south of the Fastnet Rock (50°57′N 10°06′W) by SM U-67 (Imperial German Navy). Her crew survived.
Demir Hissar	Ottoman Navy	World War I: The torpedo boat was sunk in the Strait of Chios by HMS Jed, HMS Kennet and HMS Wear (all Royal Navy).
Glendoon	Norway	World War I: The full-rigged ship was sunk in the Atlantic Ocean 60 nautical miles (110 km) west south west of the Bishop Rock, Isles of Scilly, United Kingdom (49°28′N 7°40′W) by SM U-69 (Imperial German Navy). Her crew survived.
Harrovian	United Kingdom	World War I: The cargo ship was shelled and sunk in the Atlantic Ocean 60 nautical miles (110 km) west of the Bishop Rock (49°23′N 7°40′W) by SM U-69 (Imperial German Navy). Her crew survived.
Papelera	Norway	World War I: The cargo ship was torpedoed and sunk in the Atlantic Ocean west of the Isles of Scilly by SM U-69 (Imperial German Navy). Her crew survived.
HMT Sunbeam I	Royal Navy	The naval trawler was lost on this date.

== 17 April ==
List of shipwrecks: 17 April 1916
Ship	State	Description
Ernest Reyer	France	World War I: The full-rigged ship was torpedoed and sunk in the Atlantic Ocean north west of Ouessant, Finistère (49°07′N 7°49′W) by SM U-69 (Imperial German Navy). Although her 29 crew were allowed to take to the lifeboats, they did not survive.
Terje Viken	Norway	World War I: The cargo ship struck a mine and sank in the Atlantic Ocean off Cabo Guia, Portugal. Her crew survived.

== 18 April ==
List of shipwrecks: 18 April 1916
Ship	State	Description
Caroline Gray	United States	The schooner was abandoned 128 miles (206 km) south of Frying Pan Shoals.
Emma Keeler	United States	The barge went ashore on Latimer Reef near Stonington, Connecticut.
Ravenhill	United Kingdom	World War I: The full-rigged ship was shelled and sunk in the Atlantic Ocean 72 nautical miles (133 km) west of the Bishop Rock, Isles of Scilly by SM U-69 (Imperial German Navy). Her crew survived.

== 20 April ==
List of shipwrecks: 20 April 1916
Ship	State	Description
Cairngowan	United Kingdom	World War I: The cargo ship was shelled and sunk in the Atlantic Ocean 55 nautical miles (102 km) west by north of the Fastnet Rock by SM U-69 (Imperial German Navy). Her crew survived.
Libau	Imperial German Navy	World War I: Easter Rising: The freighter, masquerading as Aud (Norway), was scuttled off Fenit, County Kerry, Ireland.
Lodewijk Van Nassau	Netherlands	World War I: The cargo ship struck a mine and sank in the North Sea off the Galloper Lightship (United Kingdom) (51°50′N 1°55′E).
Sabbia	United Kingdom	World War I: The cargo ship struck a mine and sank in the North Sea 7 nautical miles (13 km) off the Isle of May, Fife (56°07′N 2°18′W). Her crew were rescued by Nordland (Netherlands).
Whitgift	United Kingdom	World War I: The cargo ship was torpedoed and sunk in the Atlantic Ocean south west of Ouessant, Finistère, France (47°51′N 6°10′W) by SM U-67 (Imperial German Navy) with the loss of 32 crew.

== 21 April ==
List of shipwrecks: 21 April 1916
Ship	State	Description
Estafette	French Navy	World War I: The naval trawler struck a mine placed by SM UC-6 (Imperial German Navy) and sank in the North Sea off Dunkirk, Nord (51°02′N 2°11′E) with the loss of eight of her crew.
Feliciana	United Kingdom	World War I: The cargo ship was torpedoed and sunk in the Atlantic Ocean 67 nautical miles (124 km) north north west of the Fastnet Rock (51°08′N 11°27′W) by SM U-19 (Imperial German Navy). Her crew survived.

== 22 April ==
List of shipwrecks: 22 April 1916
Ship	State	Description
Chanaral	France	World War I: The four-masted barque was torpedoed and sunk in the Atlantic Ocean 60 nautical miles (110 km) south of the Bishop Rock, Isles of Scilly, United Kingdom (50°03′N 8°07′W) by SM U-67 (Imperial German Navy). Her crew survived.
József Agost Föherzeg	Italy	World War I: The cargo ship was sunk in the Atlantic Ocean (49°36′N 10°06′W by SM U-19 (Imperial German Navy).
Ross	United Kingdom	World War I: The cargo ship was torpedoed and sunk in the Atlantic Ocean 108 nautical miles (200 km) west by north of the Bishop Rock, Isles of Scilly by SM U-19 (Imperial German Navy). Her crew survived.
Tregantle	United Kingdom	World War I: The cargo ship was torpedoed and sunk in the North Sea by enemy action.

== 23 April ==
List of shipwrecks: 23 April 1916
Ship	State	Description
HMT Lena Melling	Royal Navy	World War I: The 125-foot (38 m), 274-ton steam minesweeping naval trawler struck a mine and sank in the North Sea 1 1/2 miles southwest of the Elbow Lightship (United Kingdom). Eleven of 14 crew killed.
Parisiana	United Kingdom	World War I: The cargo ship was torpedoed and sunk in the Atlantic Ocean 82 nautical miles (152 km) west of Ouessant, Finistère, France (47°55′N 7°04′W) by SM U-19 (Imperial German Navy). Her crew survived.
Olga	Norway	World War I: The barque was reported to have been sunk by a German submarine. Her crew survived.
Ribston	United Kingdom	World War I: The collier was torpedoed and sunk in the Atlantic Ocean 66 nautical miles (122 km) west by south of Ouessant (47°51′N 6°44′W) by SM U-19 (Imperial German Navy). Her crew survived.

== 24 April ==
List of shipwrecks: 24 April 1916
Ship	State	Description
HMT Clover Bank	Royal Navy	The naval trawler was lost on this date.
Hsin-Yu	National Revolutionary Army Ground Forces	The transport ship collided with Hai Yung (Republic of China Navy) in the East China Sea south of the Chusan Islands and sank. There were only 30 survivors of over 1,000 people on board.
HMT King Stephen	Royal Navy	World War I: The naval trawler, operating as a Q-ship, was sunk in the North Sea off Lowestoft, Suffolk by a Kaiserliche Marine destroyer. Her crew were taken as prisoners of war.
SM UB-13	Imperial German Navy	World War I: The Type UB I submarine was lost in action off the mouth of the River Thames with the loss of all seventeen crew.

== 25 April ==
List of shipwrecks: 25 April 1916
Ship	State	Description
HMT Au Fait	Royal Navy	The naval trawler was lost on this date.
Berkelstroom	Netherlands	World War I: The coaster was sunk in the North Sea by SM UB-29 (Imperial German Navy).
Carmanian	Norway	World War I: The barque was sunk in the Atlantic Ocean 50 nautical miles (93 km) south west of the Fastnet Rock (50°16′N 12°02′W) by SM U-19 (Imperial German Navy) with the loss of three crew.
HMS E22	Royal Navy	World War I: The E-class submarine was torpedoed and sunk in the North Sea off Great Yarmouth, Norfolk by SM UB-18 (Imperial German Navy) with the loss of all 30 crew.
Georgiy Pobedonosets	Russia	World War I: The sailing vessel was sunk in the Black Sea south west of Cape Khersones by SM UC-15 (Imperial German Navy). Her crew survived.
HMS Penelope	Royal Navy	World War I: The Arethusa-class cruiser was damaged in the North Sea of Lowestoft, Suffolk by SM UB-29 (Imperial German Navy). She was later repaired and returned to service.
Zhivuchi	Imperial Russian Navy	World War I: The Boiki-class destroyer struck a mine placed by SM UC-15 (Imperial German Navy) and sank in the Black Sea off Sevastopol.
Niola	Sweden	World War I: The iron barque, en route from Pensacola to Dundee, was scuttled by a German torpedo boat 15 nautical miles (28 km; 17 mi) from Smith's Knoll lightship. The crew was saved.

== 26 April ==
List of shipwrecks: 26 April 1916
Ship	State	Description
Alfred	United Kingdom	World War I: The fishing smack was scuttled in the North Sea 27 nautical miles (50 km) east by south of Lowestoft, Suffolk by SM UB-18 (Imperial German Navy). Her crew survived.
Dubhe	Netherlands	World War I: The cargo ship struck a mine and was damaged in the North Sea (51°49′30″N 1°57′30″E). She was beached but was later refloated.
Noordzee	Netherlands	World War I: The tug struck a mine and sank in the North Sea (51°49′30″N 1°57′30″E).

== 27 April ==
List of shipwrecks: 27 April 1916
Ship	State	Description
Industry	United Kingdom	World War I: The cargo ship was torpedoed and sunk in the Atlantic Ocean 120 nautical miles (220 km) west by north of the Fastnet Rock (51°11′N 12°46′W) by SM U-45 (Imperial German Navy). Her crew survived.
HMS Nasturtium	Royal Navy	World War I: The Arabis-class sloop struck a mine placed by SM U-73 (Imperial German Navy) and sank in the Mediterranean Sea off Malta with the loss of eight of her 79 crew.
SMS Prangenhof	Imperial German Navy	The Vorpostenboot was lost on this date.
HMS Russell	Royal Navy	World War I: The Duncan-class battleship struck two mines, laid by Imperial German Navy submarine U-73, and sank in the Mediterranean Sea at Malta and sank with the loss of 124 of her 720 crew.
SM UC-5	Imperial German Navy	World War I: The Type UC I submarine ran aground in the North Sea (51°59′N 1°38′E) and was scuttled. Her crew were rescued by HMS Firedrake (Royal Navy). She was subsequently salvaged by the British and used for propaganda purposes.

== 28 April ==
List of shipwrecks: 28 April 1916
Ship	State	Description
HMY Aegusa	Royal Navy	World War I: The armed yacht struck a mine placed by SM U-73 (Imperial German Navy) and sank in the Mediterranean Sea off Malta with the loss of six of her crew.
Anzhelika	Russia	World War I: The sailing vessel was sunk in the Black Sea off Adler by SM U-33 (Imperial German Navy).
Beatrice L. Corkum	Canada	The schooner broke up after going ashore on Catumb Reef near Watch Hill, Rhode Island. The crew were rescued by the United States Life Saving Service.
Blessing	United Kingdom	World War I: The fishing vessel was sunk in the Tyne Estuary by SM UB-27 (Imperial German Navy). Her crew survived.
Christian	Denmark	World War I: The schooner was damaged in the North Sea 16 nautical miles (30 km) east north east of the Souter Point Lighthouse, Northumberland, United Kingdom by SM UB-27 (Imperial German Navy). She was beached but was later refloated.
Lyusya	Russia	World War I: The sailing vessel was sunk in the Black Sea 5 nautical miles (9.3 km) south of Pitsunda by SM U-33 (Imperial German Navy).

== 29 April ==
List of shipwrecks: 29 April 1916
Ship	State	Description
Esmerelda	United Kingdom	The schooner collided with another vessel and sank in the Atlantic Ocean off Trevose Head, Cornwall. Her crew were rescued.
Saint Corentin	French Navy	World War I: The naval trawler struck a mine placed by SM UC-6 (Imperial German Navy) and sank in the North Sea 0.5 nautical miles (0 km) north of Dunkirk, Nord (51°04′N 2°11′E) with the loss of eleven of her crew.
Teal	United Kingdom	World War I: The coaster was torpedoed and sunk in the North Sea 2 nautical miles (3.7 km) off Seaham, County Durham by SM UB-27 (Imperial German Navy). Her crew survived.

== 30 April ==
List of shipwrecks: 30 April 1916
Ship	State	Description
Bakio	Spain	World War I: The cargo ship was torpedoed and sunk in the Atlantic Ocean by SM U-20 (Imperial German Navy).
City of Lucknow	United Kingdom	World War I: The cargo ship was torpedoed and sunk in the Mediterranean Sea 60 nautical miles (110 km) east of Malta (36°03′N 15°45′E) by SM U-21 (Imperial German Navy). Her 42 crew survived and were rescued by HMS Rifleman (Royal Navy).
Mod	Norway	World War I: The coaster was sunk in the North Sea 40 nautical miles (74 km) east by north of the mouth of the River Tyne (55°45′N 0°25′W) by SM UB-27 (Imperial German Navy). Her crew survived.
Vinifreda	Spain	World War I: The cargo ship was sunk in the Bay of Biscay (47°48′N 7°48′W) by SM U-45 (Imperial German Navy) with the loss of a crew member. Survivors were rescued by Elpis (Greece).

== Unknown date ==
List of shipwrecks: Unknown date 1916
Ship	State	Description
Chirketi Hairie	Ottoman Empire	World War I: The troopship was torpedoed and sunk in the Sea of Marmara by a Royal Navy submarine.
Imperator	Russia	World War I: The barquentine was torpedoed and damaged in the Atlantic Ocean and was abandoned by her 33 crew. They were rescued by Darentria (Netherlands) and Lady Plymouth (United Kingdom), which towed Imperator in to Valencia, Spain.
