= SM U-44 =

Military submarine

History

German Empire
- Name: U-44
- Ordered: 10 July 1913
- Builder: Kaiserliche Werft Danzig
- Yard number: 22
- Launched: 15 October 1914
- Commissioned: 7 May 1915
- Fate: Sunk 12 August 1917

General characteristics
- Class & type: Type U-43 submarine
- Displacement: 725 t (714 long tons) surfaced; 940 t (930 long tons) submerged
- Length: 65 m (213 ft 3 in) (o/a)
- Beam: 6.20 m (20 ft 4 in) (oa); 4.18 m (13 ft 9 in) (pressure hull)
- Height: 8.70 m (28 ft 7 in)
- Draught: 3.74 m (12 ft 3 in)
- Installed power: 2 × 2,000 PS (1,471 kW; 1,973 shp) surfaced; 2 × 1,200 PS (883 kW; 1,184 shp) submerged
- Propulsion: 2 shafts
- Speed: 15.2 knots (28.2 km/h; 17.5 mph) surfaced; 9.7 knots (18.0 km/h; 11.2 mph) submerged
- Range: 11,400 nmi (21,100 km; 13,100 mi) at 8 knots (15 km/h; 9.2 mph) surfaced; 51 nmi (94 km; 59 mi) at 5 knots (9.3 km/h; 5.8 mph) submerged
- Test depth: 50 m (164 ft 1 in)
- Complement: 36
- Armament: 6 × torpedo tubes (four bow, two stern); 8 torpedoes; 1 × 8.8 cm (3.5 in) SK L/30 deck gun

Service record
- Part of: III Flotilla; Unknown start - 12 August 1917
- Commanders: Kptlt. Paul Wagenführ; 7 May 1915 – 12 August 1917
- Operations: 6 patrols
- Victories: 20 merchant ships sunk (70,236 GRT); 2 auxiliary warships sunk (2,306 GRT); 1 merchant ship damaged (4,154 GRT); 1 warship damaged (1,250 tons); 3 merchant ships taken as prize (430 GRT)

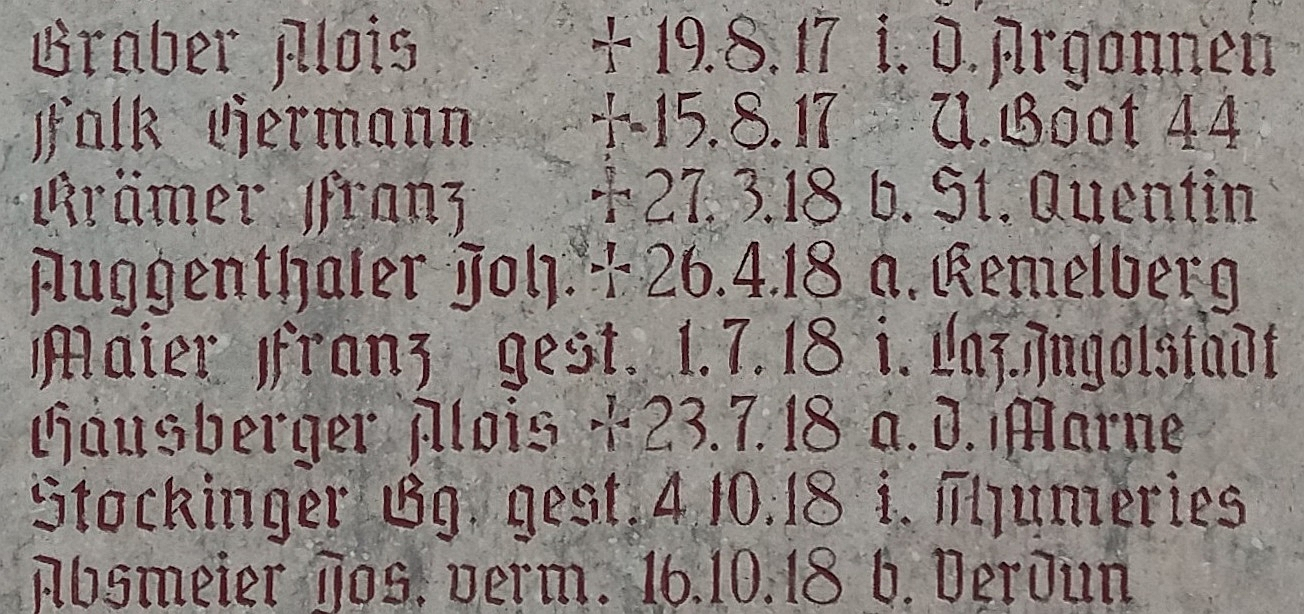
War memorial in Ruhstorf an der Rott (Bavaria) mentioning local man Hermann Falk, who was killed in action when U-44 was sunk

SM U-44 was one of the 329 submarines serving in the Imperial German Navy in World War I. She was engaged in the naval warfare and took part in the First Battle of the Atlantic. Launched in 1915, she was sunk in August 1917.

== Operations ==
SM U-44, under the command of Paul Wagenführ, was completed at Danzig about June or July 1915. She later joined the Kiel School, where she remained until 20 August 1915 undergoing trials. She then proceeded to the North Sea and was attached to the 3rd Half Flotilla.

- 25 – 26 September 1915. On Bight patrol.
- 5–10 October, 16–21 October, and 26–29 October 1915. Bight patrols.
- 14–25 December 1915. North Sea cruise.
- 17–28 January 1916. North Sea cruise to NE coast of England.
- 18 March – 17 April 1916. Northabout to Channel approach, was possibly submarine which torpedoed HMS Begonia. Sank 5 S.S., 2 sailing vessels.
- 17 May – 3 June 1916. North Sea patrol (Battle of Jutland).
- 16–21 July 1916. North Sea patrol, Returned with defect.
- 26 July – 5 August 1916. North Sea. Returned owing to bad weather.
- 16–21 August 1916. North Sea patrol.
- 17–29 September 1916. Cruise to Fair Island Channel, sank 2 S.S., 1 armed yacht, 1 armed trawler.
- 1–25 January 1917. Northabout to SW of Ireland. Returned with fracture of propeller shaft. Sank 1 S.S., 3 prizes (trawlers).
- 19 February 1917. Left for the North, but returned next day with defect.
- 24 February – 24 March 1917. Northabout to Atlantic. Sank 3 sailing vessels, and 5 S.S.
- 23 April - ? 7 May 1917. Northabout ? to west of Ireland. Sank 1 sailing vessel ? 1 S.S.

On 12 August 1917, U-44 was rammed and sunk in the North Sea south of Norway (58°50′N 4°20′E) by the Royal Navy destroyer HMS Oracle with the loss of all 44 of her crew.

== Summary of raiding history ==
Date	Name	Nationality	Tonnage (Note: Merchant ship tonnages are in gross register tons. Military vessels are listed by tons displacement.)	Fate
25 March 1916	Ottomar	Russian Empire	327	Sunk
27 March 1916	Manchester Engineer	United Kingdom	4,302	Sunk
29 March 1916	HMS Begonia	Royal Navy	1,250	Damaged
30 March 1916	Bell	Norway	3,765	Sunk
31 March 1916	Achilles	United Kingdom	7,043	Sunk
31 March 1916	Goldmouth	United Kingdom	7,446	Sunk
31 March 1916	Hans Gude	Norway	1,110	Sunk
1 April 1916	Ashburton	United Kingdom	4,445	Sunk
27 September 1916	Thurso	United Kingdom	1,244	Sunk
16 January 1917	Baron Sempill	United Kingdom	1,607	Sunk
23 January 1917	Agnes	United Kingdom	125	Captured as prize
23 January 1917	George E. Benson	United Kingdom	155	Captured as prize
23 January 1917	Vera	United Kingdom	150	Captured as prize
6 March 1917	Caldergrove	United Kingdom	4,327	Sunk
6 March 1917	Fenay Lodge	United Kingdom	3,223	Sunk
7 March 1917	Ohio	France	8,719	Sunk
8 March 1917	Dunbarmoor	United Kingdom	3,651	Sunk
8 March 1917	Silas	Norway	750	Sunk
10 March 1917	Aracataca	United Kingdom	4,154	Damaged
14 March 1917	Bray Head	United Kingdom	3,077	Sunk
16 March 1917	Narragansett	United Kingdom	9,196	Sunk
28 April 1917	Vacuum	United States	2,551	Sunk
2 May 1917	Natuna	Norway	1,121	Sunk
21 July 1917	HMT Robert Smith	Royal Navy	211	Sunk
24 July 1917	Thorsdal	Norway	2,200	Sunk
27 July 1917	John Hays Hammond	United States	132	Sunk
5 August 1917	HMS Bracondale	Royal Navy	2,095	Sunk

== Bibliography ==
- Gröner, Erich; Jung, Dieter; Maass, Martin (1991). U-boats and Mine Warfare Vessels. German Warships 1815–1945. Vol. 2. Translated by Thomas, Keith; Magowan, Rachel. London: Conway Maritime Press. ISBN 0-85177-593-4.
- Rössler, Eberhard (1981). The U-boat : the evolution and technical history of German submarines. London: Cassell. ISBN 0304361208.
