= SS Tubantia =

Dutch ocean liner that a U-boat sank in 1916

Coordinates: 51°49′N 2°50′E

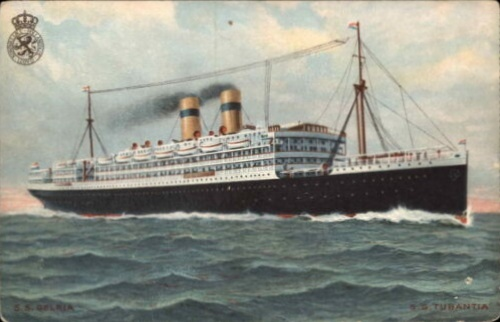
- Postcard representing the sister ships Gelria and Tubantia

History

Netherlands
- Name: Tubantia
- Owner: Koninklijke Hollandsche Lloyd
- Port of registry: Amsterdam
- Route: Amsterdam – Buenos Aires
- Builder: A Stephen & Sons, Glasgow
- Cost: £300,000
- Yard number: 455
- Launched: 15 November 1913
- Completed: 11 March 1914
- Identification: code letters PVDL; call sign PET
- Fate: Sunk by torpedo, 16 March 1916

General characteristics
- Type: Ocean liner
- Tonnage: 13,911 GRT, 8,561 NRT, 9,215 DWT
- Length: 560 ft (170 m) overall; 540.4 ft (164.7 m) registered
- Beam: 65.8 ft (20.1 m)
- Depth: 35.3 ft (10.8 m)
- Decks: 2
- Installed power: 1,725 NHP, 11,000 ihp
- Propulsion: 2 × screws; 2 × quadruple-expansion engines
- Speed: 16 knots (30 km/h)
- Capacity: passengers: 252 × 1st class, 236 × 2nd class, 135 × 3rd class, 854 × steerage; cargo: 357,000 cu ft (10,100 m^{3}) bale
- Crew: 194
- Sensors & processing systems: submarine signalling
- Notes: sister ship: Gelria

SS Tubantia was a Dutch-owned ocean liner that was launched in Scotland in 1914. She and her sister ship Gelria were the largest and swiftest ships in the Koninklijke Hollandsche Lloyd (KHL) fleet. They were also the first KHL ships to have quadruple-expansion steam engines.

A U-boat of the German Imperial Navy sank Tubantia in the North Sea in 1916. She was the largest neutral ship sunk in the First World War. Germany variously tried to claim that a British mine or a British torpedo had sunk her, or even a German torpedo that had been astray by itself for ten days. The Dutch public was outraged at both the sinking and the German disinformation campaign. KHL's compensation claim against Germany was not settled until 1922.

Tubantia was reputed to be carrying £2 million in specie when she was sunk. Between 1924 and 1927 a British salvage diving operator tried to recover the gold, without success. However, the decision by an English court on a legal dispute between two rival salvors wishing to attempt the salvage remains a leading part of the case law of marine salvage.

== Building ==
In 1913 and 1914 Alexander Stephen and Sons built a pair of sister ships at its yard in Linthouse, Glasgow, for KHL. Gelria was launched in May 1913 and completed that October. Tubantia was built as yard number 455, launched on 15 November 1913, and completed on 11 March 1914. She cost £300,000.

Tubantia's length overall was 560 ft (170 m) and her registered length was 540.4 ft (164.7 m). Her beam was 65.8 ft (20.1 m) and her depth was 35.3 ft (10.8 m). Her tonnages were 13,911 GRT, 8,561 NRT and 9,215 DWT. She had berths for 1,477 passengers: 252 first class, 236 second class, 135 third class and 854 steerage. Her holds had capacity for 357,000 cu ft (10,100 m^{3}) of baled cargo.

Tubantia had twin screws, each driven by a quadruple-expansion steam engine. Together her twin engines were rated at 1,725 NHP or 11,000 ihp. She achieved 17 1/2 knots (32.4 km/h) on her sea trials, exceeding the speed required by the contract to build her, and could cruise at 16 knots (30 km/h).

One author claims Tubantia was among the most luxurious passenger ships of her era. Her electrical equipment ranged from laundry equipment and ventilation fans to cigar lighters. Her name was spelt out in electric lights, suspended between her two funnels.

KHL registered Tubantia at Amsterdam. Her code letters were PVDL. Her navigation equipment included submarine signalling, and she was equipped for wireless telegraphy. Her call sign was PET.

== Career ==
Tubantia worked KHL's route between Amsterdam and Buenos Aires. When the First World War broke out in August 1914, she was returning from South America with £500,000 in gold destined for banks in London, much of which for the German Bank of London. She was also carrying about 150 German reservists in steerage and a cargo of grain destined for Germany. After she called at Vigo, Spain, the Royal Navy cruiser HMS Highflyer stopped Tubantia, put a boarding party aboard her, and escorted into Plymouth. There, Royal Marines disembarked the German reservists, and the gold was confiscated and taken ashore. Tubantia was released then from Plymouth and allowed to resume her voyage.

The New York Times reported that on 17 October Tubantia ran aground on the coast of Kent while en route from Buenos Aires to Rotterdam. Aid had been summoned from Dover, but the report did not say whether Tubantia was damaged.

In December 1915 the Overseas News Agency in Berlin claimed that the British authorities had seized all the mail and parcels from South America aboard Tubantia. The US expressed concern that the British had seized items from two Dutch ships in transatlantic service between the Netherlands and the US – Nieuw Amsterdam and Rijndam. The British Foreign Office replied by stating that contraband intended for Germany — which included four packages of rubber, and seven containers of wool — had been found among Tubantia's mail.

== Loss ==
On 15 March 1916 Tubantia left Amsterdam on a scheduled sailing to Buenos Aires. She carried only 80 passengers. At 0200 hrs on 16 March she anchored about 4 nautical miles (7.4 km) from the North Hinder Lightship, and about 50 nautical miles (93 km) off the Dutch coast, to await dawn and avoid misidentification or attack. She was completely illuminated.

At about 0230 hrs her lookouts sighted a stream of bubbles rapidly approaching her starboard side. There was an explosion, and she quickly began to sink. Three ships answered her distress signals: Breda, Krakatau, and La Campine. Between them they rescued all 80 passengers and all 294 crew members from Tubantia. She was the largest neutral vessel sunk during the war.

== Aftermath ==
Dutch artist Piet van der Hem's editorial cartoon decrying the sinking of Tubantia

A propaganda war between British and German newspapers broke out, with Germany trying to blame Britain, and Britain rebutting the accusation. Both sides had in mind the serious violation of Dutch neutrality. German newspapers first claimed that a British mine must have sunk Tubantia. The British reported that a German torpedo had sunk her. German newspapers replied that if a torpedo had sunk the ship, it had to have been British. A drifting lifeboat from Tubantia was found, examined, and found to have bronze torpedo fragments embedded in it. Germany was the only country that used bronze in its torpedoes.

Presented with evidence that it was torpedo no. 2033 which had been assigned to the small, coastal submarine UB-13, (Note: Sources almost invariably report the submarine as U-boat 13 or U-13. UB-13 was the only extant U-boat numbered 13 in March 1916; U-13 and UC-13 had been lost in 1914 and 1915, respectively.See: Helgason, Guðmundur. "WWI U-boats: U 13". German and Austrian U-boats of World War I - Kaiserliche Marine - Uboat.net. Helgason, Guðmundur. "WWI U-boats: UB 13". German and Austrian U-boats of World War I - Kaiserliche Marine - Uboat.net. Helgason, Guðmundur. "WWI U-boats: UC 13". German and Austrian U-boats of World War I - Kaiserliche Marine - Uboat.net.) German authorities presented a forged log from UB-13 that showed her nowhere near Tubantia at the time of the attack. They claimed UB-13 had fired that specific torpedo at a British warship on 6 March, ten days before Tubantia was sunk. The US Minister to the Netherlands, Henry van Dyke, writing in Fighting for Peace in 1917, called this explanation "amazing" and derided it:

This certain U-boat had fired this particular torpedo at a British war-vessel somewhere in the North Sea ten days before the Tubantia was sunk. The shot missed its mark. But the naughty undisciplined little torpedo went cruising around in the sea on its own hook for ten days waiting for a chance to kill somebody. Then the Tubantia came along and the wandering-Willy torpedo promptly, obstinately, ran into the ship and sank her. This was the explanation. Germany was not to blame.

The Dutch public was furious at what it believed a hostile German act. To help divert the public anger against his country, German diplomat Richard von Kühlmann began a coordinated campaign to spread rumors of an impending British invasion of the Netherlands. One author calls the German plan a "propaganda coup". The rumors caused some panic in the streets, and the Dutch government declared a four-day emergency from 30 March to 2 April.

Despite denials and rumor-spreading, Germany nevertheless offered compensation in the amount of £300,000, Tubantia's original cost. Rejected by the Dutch, the two countries agreed to have the issue arbitrated after the end of the war. The dispute was finally settled in 1922, when KHL was awarded compensation equivalent to £830,000.

== Salvage attempt ==
In 1924 two sets of salvors contested the salvage rights to the wreck, each wishing to try to recover £2 million of gold coins that she was reputed to be carrying. An English court resolved the dispute, and its decision The Tubantia [1924] P 78, remains the leading authority under English law as to when a salvor takes possession of a sunken shipwreck. The winning party, Royal Naval Air Service veteran Sydney Vincent Sippe, spent three years and £100,000 trying to access the gold, but abandoned the attempt after concluding that it was too dangerous for divers to recover it.

== Bibliography ==
- Lloyd's Register of Shipping. Vol. II.–Steamers, Sailing Vessels, and Owners. London: Lloyd's Register of Shipping. 1914 – via Internet Archive.
- The Marconi Press Agency Ltd (1914). The Year Book of Wireless Telegraphy and Telephony. London: The Marconi Press Agency Ltd.
- Pickford, Nigel (2006). Lost Treasure Ships of the Northern Seas: A Guide and Gazetteer to 2000 Years of Shipwreck. London: Chatham. ISBN 978-1-86176-250-4. OCLC 67375472.
- van Dyke, Henry (1921). The Works of Henry Van Dyke (Avalon ed.). New York: Charles Scribner's Sons. ISBN 0-665-81693-6. OCLC 9473678.
- van Tuyll van Serooskerken, Hubert P (2001). The Netherlands and World War I: Espionage, Diplomacy and Survival. Leiden: Brill. ISBN 978-90-04-12243-7. OCLC 48081143.
- Wilson, George Grafton (1922). "Report of the International Commission of Inquiry in the Loss of the Dutch Steamer Tubantia". The American Journal of International Law. 16 (3): 432–433. doi:10.2307/2188183. ISSN 0002-9300. JSTOR 2188183. OCLC 1480149. S2CID 146986647.
