= SM U-32 (Germany) =

German Type U 31 U-boat

Coordinates: 36.07°N 13.28°E

History

German Empire
- Name: U-32
- Ordered: 29 March 1912
- Builder: Germaniawerft, Kiel
- Yard number: 192
- Laid down: 8 November 1912
- Launched: 28 January 1914
- Commissioned: 3 September 1914
- Fate: Sunk 8 May 1918

General characteristics
- Class & type: Type U 31 submarine
- Displacement: 685 t (674 long tons) (surfaced); 878 t (864 long tons) (submerged)
- Length: 64.70 m (212 ft 3 in) (o/a); 52.36 m (171 ft 9 in) (pressure hull)
- Beam: 6.32 m (20 ft 9 in) (o/a); 4.05 m (13 ft 3 in) (pressure hull)
- Draught: 3.56 m (11 ft 8 in)
- Installed power: 2 × 1,850 PS (1,361 kW; 1,825 shp) diesel engines; 2 × 1,200 PS (883 kW; 1,184 shp) Doppelmodyn
- Propulsion: 2 × shafts; 2 × 1.60 m (5 ft 3 in) propellers
- Speed: 16.4 knots (30.4 km/h; 18.9 mph) (surfaced); 9.7 knots (18.0 km/h; 11.2 mph) (submerged)
- Range: 8,790 nmi (16,280 km; 10,120 mi) at 8 knots (15 km/h; 9.2 mph) (surfaced); 80 nmi (150 km; 92 mi) at 5 knots (9.3 km/h; 5.8 mph) (submerged)
- Test depth: 50 m (164 ft 1 in)
- Boats & landing craft carried: 1 dinghy
- Complement: 4 officers, 31 enlisted
- Armament: four 50 cm (20 in) torpedo tubes (2 each bow and stern); 6 torpedoes; two 8.8 cm (3.5 in) SK L/30 deck guns

Service record
- Part of: IV Flotilla; 3 September 1914 – 8 November 1916; Pola / Mittelmeer Flotilla; 8 November 1916 – 8 May 1918
- Commanders: Kptlt. Edgar von Spiegel von und zu Peckelsheim; 3 September 1914 - 17 March 1916; Kptlt. Kurt Hartwig; 18 March 1916 - 15 February 1918; Kptlt. Kurt Albrecht; 16 February - 8 May 1918
- Operations: 11 patrols
- Victories: 37 merchant ships sunk (106,035 GRT); 1 warship sunk (14,000 tons); 3 merchant ships damaged (18,554 GRT); 1 merchant ship taken as prize (1,115 GRT)

SM U-32 was a German Type U 31 U-boat of the Imperial German Navy.

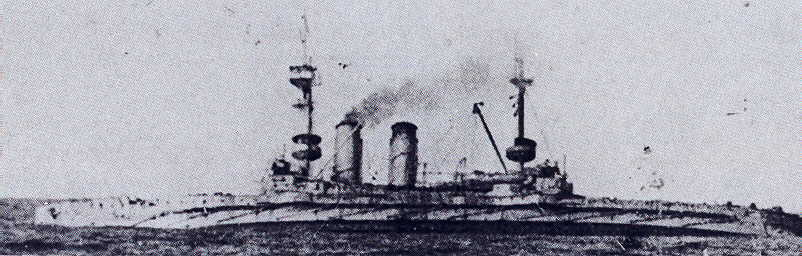
Cornwallis sinking in the Mediterranean Sea on 9 January 1917 after being torpedoed by U-32.

Her construction was ordered on 29 March 1912 and her keel was laid down on 8 November 1912 by Germaniawerft of Kiel. She was launched on 28 January 1914 and commissioned on 3 September 1914 under the command of Edgar von Spiegel von und zu Peckelsheim. On 1 February 1916 Spiegel was relieved by Kurt Hartwig who commanded the boat until 16 February 1918 when Karl Albrecht took over. Albrecht commanded her until her loss.

U-32 conducted 11 patrols, sinking 37 merchant ships totalling 106,035 gross register tons (GRT) and one warship for 14,000 tons. On 9 January 1917, to the East of Malta, U-32 sank the British pre-dreadnought battleship HMS Cornwallis, with the loss of 15 lives.

== Design ==
Type U 31 submarines were double-hulled ocean-going submarines similar to Type 23 and Type 27 subs in dimensions and differed only slightly in propulsion and speed. They were considered very good high sea boats with average manoeuvrability and good surface steering.

U-32 had an overall length of 64.70 m (212 ft 3 in), her pressure hull was 52.36 m (171 ft 9 in) long. The boat's beam was 6.32 m (20 ft 9 in) (o/a), while the pressure hull measured 4.05 m (13 ft 3 in). Type 31s had a draught of 3.56 m (11 ft 8 in) with a total height of 7.68–8.04 m (25 ft 2 in – 26 ft 5 in). The boats displaced a total of 971 tonnes (956 long tons); 685 t (674 long tons) when surfaced and 878 t (864 long tons) when submerged.

U-32 was fitted with two Germania 6-cylinder two-stroke diesel engines with a total of 1,850 metric horsepower (1,361 kW; 1,825 bhp) for use on the surface and two Siemens-Schuckert double-acting electric motors with a total of 1,200 PS (883 kW; 1,184 shp) for underwater use. These engines powered two shafts each with a 1.60 m (5 ft 3 in) propeller, which gave the boat a top surface speed of 16.4 knots (30.4 km/h; 18.9 mph), and 9.7 knots (18.0 km/h; 11.2 mph) when submerged. Cruising range was 8,790 nautical miles (16,280 km; 10,120 mi) at 8 knots (15 km/h; 9.2 mph) on the surface, and 80 nmi (150 km; 92 mi) at 5 knots (9.3 km/h; 5.8 mph) under water. Diving depth was 50 m (164 ft 1 in).

The U-boat was armed with four 50 cm (20 in) torpedo tubes, two fitted in the bow and two in the stern, and carried 6 torpedoes. Additionally U-32 was equipped in 1915 with two 8.8 cm (3.5 in) Uk L/30 deck guns. The boat's complement was 4 officers and 31 enlisted.

== Fate ==
Wreck location

On 8 May 1918 north-west of Malta she was shelled and then depth charged by HMS Wallflower and sunk with all hands, 41 dead.

== Summary of raiding history ==
Date	Name	Nationality	Tonnage (Note: Merchant ship tonnages are in gross register tons. Military vessels are listed by tons displacement.)	Fate
8 April 1915	Chateaubriand	France	2,247	Sunk
11 April 1915	Wayfarer	United Kingdom	9,599	Damaged
22 June 1915	Kiew	Denmark	1,115	Captured as prize
4 March 1916	Teutonian	United Kingdom	4,824	Sunk
5 March 1916	Rothesay	United Kingdom	2,007	Sunk
6 March 1916	Trois Freres	France	107	Sunk
7 March 1916	Ville Du Havre	France	3,109	Sunk
18 October 1916	Athene	Norway	1,847	Sunk
30 October 1916	Marquis Bacquehem	United Kingdom	4,396	Sunk
30 October 1916	Vertunno	Kingdom of Italy	3,239	Sunk
27 November 1916	City of Birmingham	United Kingdom	7,498	Sunk
27 November 1916	Karnak	France	6,816	Sunk
30 November 1916	S. Antonio	Kingdom of Italy	611	Sunk
1 December 1916	Cuore Di Gesu	Kingdom of Italy	199	Sunk
1 December 1916	Lampo	Kingdom of Italy	59	Sunk
2 December 1916	Angela Madre G.	Kingdom of Italy	155	Sunk
3 December 1916	Lucellum	United Kingdom	5,184	Damaged
6 December 1916	Campania	Kingdom of Italy	4,297	Sunk
8 December 1916	Carmelina Dominici	Kingdom of Italy	94	Sunk
12 December 1916	Saint Ursula	United Kingdom	5,011	Sunk
7 January 1917	Rosalia L.	Kingdom of Italy	7,186	Sunk
9 January 1917	HMS Cornwallis	Royal Navy	14,000	Sunk
10 April 1917	Porto Di Rodi	Kingdom of Italy	2,480	Sunk
12 April 1917	Kildale	United Kingdom	3,830	Sunk
17 April 1917	Costante	Kingdom of Italy	3,479	Sunk
18 April 1917	Rinaldo	United Kingdom	4,321	Sunk
21 April 1917	Giosue	Kingdom of Italy	140	Sunk
12 May 1917	Locksley Hall	United Kingdom	3,635	Sunk
24 May 1917	Biarritz	France	2,758	Sunk
16 July 1917	Khephren	United Kingdom	2,774	Sunk
16 July 1917	Porto Di Adalia	Kingdom of Italy	4,073	Sunk
17 July 1917	Virent	United Kingdom	3,771	Damaged
19 July 1917	Varvara	Greece	1,316	Sunk
20 September 1917	Kurdistan	United Kingdom	3,720	Sunk
22 September 1917	Caroline	France	107	Sunk
24 September 1917	Iriston	United Kingdom	3,221	Sunk
29 September 1917	Sanwen	United Kingdom	3,689	Sunk
4 October 1917	Constantinos Embiricos	Greece	2,611	Sunk
4 October 1917	Nicolaos Roussos	Greece	2,421	Sunk
10 October 1917	Transporteur	France	1,812	Sunk
21 April 1918	Bellview	United Kingdom	3,567	Sunk
1 May 1918	Era	Australia	2,379	Sunk

== Original documents from Room 40 ==
The following is a verbatim transcription of the recorded activities of SM U-32 known to British Naval Intelligence, Room 40 O.B.:

"SM U-32.

Oberlt.z.S. Spiegel von und zu Peckelsheim, later to U-93. Kaptlt. Hartwig October 1916 to Sept/October 1918, then to U-63. Kaptlt. Karl Albrecht, lost with her. Came off the stocks at Kiel about the end of October 1914 and did trials at Kiel School, leaving for the North Sea on 27 November. In December 1914 and January 1915, and February 1915, she was occasionally employed on patrol in the Bight, and was twice in dockyard hands with engine or other trouble. She was attached to the 4th Half Flotilla.

- 3 – 17 April 1915. Channel via Dover. Home northabout 1 S.S., 1 sailing vessel sunk, in Channel.
- 12 – 24 June 1915. North Sea, 1 prize taken in.
- 9 – 13 August 1915. Bight patrol.
- 14th – ? 16 August 1915. Bight anti-air raid patrol.
- 22 – 27 August 1915. North Sea. Returned owing to compass failure.
- 11 – 13 September 1915. To Flanders (Ostend).
- 19 – 21 September 1915. Ostend to Emden.
- ? 2 October 1915 – ? 4 October 1915. Bight patrol.
- 20 October 1915. Emden to List.
- 24 – 27 October 1915. North Sea.
- 29 December 1915 – 2 January 1916. ? North Sea patrol.
- 17 January 1916. On Bight patrol.
- 23 January – 3 February 1916. On Bight patrol.
- 11 – 14 February 1916. On Bight patrol.
- 26 February – 17 March 1916. Northabout to Channel approach. Sank 2 S.S., 2 sailing vessels.
- 16 – 18 April 1916. Bight patrol.
- 22 April 1916. Bight patrol.
- 27 April – 8 May 1916. North Sea patrol.
- 16 May – 3 June 1916. North Sea patrol (Jutland Battle).
- 24 – 25 August 1916. Bight patrol.
- 28 August – 1 September 1916. North Sea patrol.
- 20 September – 1 October 1916. ? North Sea.
- 16 October – 7/8 November 1916. Northabout to Mediterranean. Arrived Cattaro 7/8 November. Sank 2 S.S. and was fired at by S.S. ARLINGTON COURT on 30 October. When in Mediterranean she was with Pola-Cattaro Flotilla.
- End of November – Middle of December 1916. Proceeded out from Cattaro and cruised in Mediterranean (central). Sank 6 S.S., 9 sailing vessels (including the French S.S. KARNAK). U-32 with another submarine seems to have been concerned in attack on British S.S. NAGOYA but was driven off by gunfire.
- 2 January 1917 – 18 January 1917. On a cruise in central Mediterranean. Sank 2 S.S., 1 sailing vessel, and H.M.S. CORNWALLIS.
- February 1917 – March 1918. Operating in Mediterranean.
- 16 April 1918. Left Cattaro and cruised in western Mediterranean. Sank 1 S.S. and missed another by torpedo. On 24 April was sighted 50 miles N. of Algiers. She was sunk on 8 May 1918 by H.M.S. WALLFLOWER in 36°8'N., 13°30'E., apparently while returning from this cruise."

Note: S.S. = Steam Ship; S.V. = Sailing Vessel; northabout, Muckle Flugga, Fair I. = around Scotland; Sound, Belts, Kattegat = via North of Denmark to/from German Baltic ports; Bight = to/from German North Sea ports; success = sinking of ships

— Koerver, Hans Joachim (2009). Room 40: German Naval Warfare 1914-1918. Vol II., The Fleet in Being. Steinbach: LIS Reinisch. ISBN 978-3-902433-77-0.

== See also ==
- Room 40

== Bibliography ==
- Gröner, Erich; Jung, Dieter; Maass, Martin (1991). U-boats and Mine Warfare Vessels. German Warships 1815–1945. Vol. 2. Translated by Thomas, Keith; Magowan, Rachel. London: Conway Maritime Press. ISBN 0-85177-593-4.
- Spindler, Arno (1966) [1932]. Der Handelskrieg mit U-Booten. 5 Vols. Berlin: Mittler & Sohn. Vols. 4+5, dealing with 1917+18, are very hard to find: Guildhall Library, London, has them all, also Vol. 1-3 in an English translation: The submarine war against commerce.
- Beesly, Patrick (1982). Room 40: British Naval Intelligence 1914-1918. London: H Hamilton. ISBN 978-0-241-10864-2.
- Halpern, Paul G. (1995). A Naval History of World War I. New York: Routledge. ISBN 978-1-85728-498-0.
- Roessler, Eberhard (1997). Die Unterseeboote der Kaiserlichen Marine. Bonn: Bernard & Graefe. ISBN 978-3-7637-5963-7.
- Schroeder, Joachim (2002). Die U-Boote des Kaisers. Bonn: Bernard & Graefe. ISBN 978-3-7637-6235-4.
- Koerver, Hans Joachim (2008). Room 40: German Naval Warfare 1914-1918. Vol I., The Fleet in Action. Steinbach: LIS Reinisch. ISBN 978-3-902433-76-3.
- Koerver, Hans Joachim (2009). Room 40: German Naval Warfare 1914-1918. Vol II., The Fleet in Being. Steinbach: LIS Reinisch. ISBN 978-3-902433-77-0.
