= List of shipwrecks in January 1917 =

The list of shipwrecks in January 1917 includes ships sunk, foundered, grounded, or otherwise lost during January 1917.

== 1 January ==
List of shipwrecks: 1 January 1917
Ship	State	Description
Baycraig	United Kingdom	World War I: The cargo ship was torpedoed and sunk in the Mediterranean Sea 84 nautical miles (156 km) east south east of Malta (35°32′N 16°10′E) by SM UC-22 (Imperial German Navy). Her crew survived, but her captain was taken as a prisoner of war.
Britannic	Norway	World War I: The cargo ship was sunk in the Atlantic Ocean 44 nautical miles (81 km) west of Leixões, Portugal (40°58′N 9°30′W) by SM UC-37 (Imperial German Navy). Her crew survived.
Goosebridge	Sweden	World War I: The cargo ship was sunk in the Atlantic Ocean 10 nautical miles (19 km) west north west of Ouessant, Finistère, France (48°39′N 5°13′W) by SM UC-46 (Imperial German Navy).
Holly Branch	United Kingdom	World War I: The cargo ship was scuttled in the Atlantic Ocean 14 nautical miles (26 km) north east by north of the Île de Batz, Finistère, France (48°59′N 3°56′W) by SM UB-39 (Imperial German Navy). Her crew survived.
Ivernia	United Kingdom	World War I: The troopship was torpedoed and sunk in the Mediterranean Sea 58 nautical miles (107 km) south east of Cape Matapan, Greece (35°30′N 22°53′E) by SM UB-47 (Imperial German Navy) with the loss of 125 lives. Survivors were rescued by HMS Rifleman and a number of naval trawlers (all Royal Navy).
Laupar	Norway	World War I: the cargo ship was sunk in the Atlantic Ocean 40 nautical miles (74 km) west north west of Porto, Portugal by SM U-79 (Imperial German Navy). Her crew survived.
Leon	France	World War I: The coaster was sunk in the Atlantic Ocean 13 nautical miles (24 km) north north east of the Triagoz Lighthouse, Finistère by SM UB-39 (Imperial German Navy). Her crew survived.
Sussex	United Kingdom	World War I: The cargo ship struck a mine and was damaged in the North Sea 4 nautical miles (7.4 km) off Gravelines, Pas-de-Calais, France. She was beached without loss of life. Later refloated, repaired and returned to service.
Tsiropinas	Greece	World War I: The cargo ship was torpedoed and sunk in the Atlantic Ocean off Ferrol, Galicia, Spain (45°35′N 8°19′W) by SM U-70 (Imperial German Navy).
Venus II	French Navy	The submarine decoy ship was lost on this date.
Wanola	Canada	The schooner went ashore near Allerton Point, Massachusetts. Rigging, gear and some cargo salvaged. Later sold and raised.

== 2 January ==
List of shipwrecks: 2 January 1917
Ship	State	Description
Aconcagua	France	World War I: The full-rigged ship was shelled and sunk in the Bay of Biscay (46°11′N 7°26′W) by SM U-70 (Imperial German Navy).
Aristotelis C. Ioannou	Greece	World War I: The cargo ship was sunk in the Atlantic Ocean 30 nautical miles (56 km) west of Cape Roca, Portugal (38°55′N 9°48′W) by SM UC-37 (Imperial German Navy).
Asnières	France	World War I: The crew were captured by the merchant raider SMS Möwe (Imperial German Navy) which then sank the four-masted barque close to the St Peter and St Paul rocks in the Atlantic Ocean.
Bestik	Norway	World War I: The cargo ship was sunk in the Atlantic Ocean 30 nautical miles (56 km) south west of the Bishop Rock, Isles of Scilly, United Kingdom by SM UB-18 (Imperial German Navy). Her crew survived.
Carlyle	United Kingdom	World War I: The coaster was scuttled in the Atlantic Ocean 5 nautical miles (9.3 km) west south west of the Île de Sein Lighthouse, Finistère, France by SM UB-39 (Imperial German Navy). Her crew survived.
Dimitrios Goulandris	Greece	World War I: The cargo ship was shelled and sunk in the Atlantic Ocean 30 nautical miles (56 km) west of Cape Roca (39°10′N 9°50′W) by SM UC-37 (Imperial German Navy). Her crew survived.
Edward Arthur	United Kingdom	The schooner was wrecked on Lundy Island, Devon.
Ellik	Norway	World War I: The coaster was sunk in the Atlantic Ocean 40 nautical miles (74 km) south west of the Bishop Rock by SM UB-18 (Imperial German Navy). Her fourteen crew were rescued, eight of them by Elisabeth van België (Belgium). The second lifeboat with the rest of the crew landed on the Isles of Scilly.
El Toro	United Kingdom	The tanker foundered in the Atlantic Ocean 300 nautical miles (560 km) north west of Clogherhead, County Louth.
Gallier	United Kingdom	World War I: The cargo ship was torpedoed and sunk in the Atlantic Ocean by U-95 (Imperial German Navy) 7 nautical miles (13 km) east north east of the Wolf Rock, Cornwall.
Johannes	Russia	The schooner was wrecked at Cádiz, Spain.
Notre Dame du Verger	France	World War I: The three-masted schooner was scuttled in the Atlantic Ocean 12 nautical miles (22 km) off Cape Roca by SM UC-37 (Imperial German Navy). Her crew survived.
Odda	Norway	World War I: The cargo ship was sunk in the Atlantic Ocean 70 nautical miles (130 km) south west of Ouessant, Finistère (47°30′N 6°20′W) by SM U-70 (Imperial German Navy). Her crew survived.
Older	Norway	World War I: The cargo ship was sunk in the Atlantic Ocean 25 nautical miles (46 km) west of Porto, Portugal (41°07′N 9°42′W) by SM U-79 (Imperial German Navy). Her crew were rescued by Charkow (Denmark).
Omnium	France	World War I: The cargo ship was sunk in the Atlantic Ocean 120 nautical miles (220 km) west south west of Penmarc'h, Finistère (47°26′N 7°10′W) by SM U-82 (Imperial German Navy).
San Leandro	Spain	World War I: The cargo ship was sunk in the Atlantic Ocean (approximately 46°40′N 7°00′W) by SM U-70 (Imperial German Navy).

== 3 January ==
List of shipwrecks: 3 January 1917
Ship	State	Description
Angela	Italy	World War I: The cargo ship was sunk in the Atlantic Ocean 35 nautical miles (65 km) west of Cape St. Vincent, Portugal by SM U-79 (Imperial German Navy). Her crew survived.
Capricieuse	France	World War I: The schooner was scuttled in the Atlantic Ocean 12 nautical miles (22 km) west south west of Cape St. Vincent by SM UC-37 (Imperial German Navy). Her crew survived.
Columbia	France	World War I: The fishing vessel was scuttled in the Bay of Biscay off La Rochelle, Charente-Maritime (46°27′N 2°28′W) by SM UB-39 (Imperial German Navy).
Diamant de la Couronne I	France	World War I: The fishing vessel was scuttled in the Bay of Biscay off La Rochelle (46°27′N 2°28′W) by SM UB-39 (Imperial German Navy).
Diamant de la Couronne II	France	World War I: The fishing vessel was scuttled in the Bay of Biscay off La Rochelle (46°27′N 2°28′W) by SM UB-39 (Imperial German Navy).
Fama	Norway	World War I: The cargo ship was scuttled in the Atlantic Ocean south west of Spain (36°47′N 8°43′W) by SM UC-37 (Imperial German Navy). Her crew survived.
Formidable	France	World War I: The fishing vessel was sunk in the Bay of Biscay off La Rochelle by SM UB-39 (Imperial German Navy).
Helgøy	Norway	World War I: The cargo ship was sunk in the Bay of Biscay 10 nautical miles (19 km) south of the Chassiron Lighthouse, Charente-Maritime (45°55′N 1°35′W) by SM UB-39 (Imperial German Navy) with the loss of a crew member.
Honneur et Devouement	France	World War I: The fishing vessel was sunk in the Bay of Biscay off La Rochelle by SM UB-39 (Imperial German Navy).
Jeanne Mathilde	France	World War I: The fishing vessel was sunk in the Bay of Biscay off La Rochelle by SM UB-39 (Imperial German Navy).
La Pensee	France	World War I: The fishing vessel was sunk in the Bay of Biscay off La Rochelle by SM UB-39 (Imperial German Navy).
Marie Henriette	France	World War I: The fishing vessel was sunk in the Bay of Biscay off La Rochelle by SM UB-39 (Imperial German Navy).
Moderne	France	World War I: The fishing vessel was sunk in the Bay of Biscay off La Rochelle by SM UB-39 (Imperial German Navy).
Petite Emile	France	World War I: The fishing vessel was scuttled in the Bay of Biscay 40 nautical miles (74 km) west of the Baleines Lighthouse, Seine-Inférieure by SM UB-39 (Imperial German Navy). Her crew survived.
Père Montfort	France	World War I: The fishing vessel was sunk in the Bay of Biscay off La Rochelle by SM UB-39 (Imperial German Navy).
Pierre le Grand	France	World War I: The fishing vessel was sunk in the Bay of Biscay off La Rochelle by SM UB-39 (Imperial German Navy).
Richelieu	France	World War I: The fishing vessel was sunk in the Bay of Biscay off La Rochelle by SM UB-39 (Imperial German Navy). Her crew survived.
Saint Jacques	France	World War I: The fishing vessel was sunk in the Bay of Biscay off La Rochelle (46°27′N 2°28′W) by SM UB-39 (Imperial German Navy).
Saint Paul II	France	World War I: The fishing vessel was sunk in the Bay of Biscay off La Rochelle by SM UB-39 (Imperial German Navy). Her crew survived.
Thomas Edison Mulqueen	United States	The barge foundered in a gale and heavy seas six miles (9.7 km) west of Point Judith, Rhode Island, a total loss.
Valladares	Portugal	World War I: The sailing vessel was sunk in the Atlantic Ocean (43°30′N 9°48′W) by SM U-79 (Imperial German Navy).
Viking	Denmark	World War I: The coaster was sunk in the Atlantic Ocean by SM U-82 (Imperial German Navy). Her crew survived.

== 4 January ==
List of shipwrecks: 4 January 1917
Ship	State	Description
Calabro	Italy	World War I: The cargo ship was sunk in the Atlantic Ocean south west of Ouessant, Finistère, France (48°30′N 7°02′W) by SM U-82 (Imperial German Navy). Her crew survived.
Chinto Maru	Japan	World War I: The cargo ship was sunk in the Atlantic Ocean south west of Spain (36°29′N 9°36′W) by SM U-79 (Imperial German Navy).
Gabrielle François	France	World War I: The fishing vessel was sunk in the Gironde Estuary by SM UB-39 (Imperial German Navy).
Liberté	France	World War I: The schooner was shelled and sunk in the Atlantic Ocean off Cape St. Vincent, Portugal (35°49′N 6°10′W) by SM UC-37 (Imperial German Navy). Her crew survived.
Lonclara	United Kingdom	World War I: The cargo ship struck a mine placed by SM UC-31 (Imperial German Navy) and sank in the River Tyne at Sunderland, County Tyne and Wear with the loss of four of her crew.
Luigi Ciampa	Italy	World War I: The cargo ship was sunk in the Atlantic Ocean 15 nautical miles (28 km) off Sagres Point, Portugal by SM UC-37 (Imperial German Navy). Her crew survived.
Næsborg	Denmark	World War I: The cargo ship was sunk in the English Channel west of Guernsey, Channel Islands (49°26′N 3°40′W) by SM UB-18 (Imperial German Navy). Her crew survived.
Peresvet	Imperial Russian Navy	World War I: The Peresvet-class battleship struck two mines and sank in the Mediterranean Sea 10 nautical miles (19 km) north of Port Said, Egypt, with the loss of 167 of her 771 crew.
Ruby	Russia	World War I: The barque was scuttled in the Atlantic Ocean off the Isles of Scilly, United Kingdom (49°53′N 8°24′W) by SM U-70 (Imperial German Navy).
Seemel	Russia	World War I: The sailing vessel was sunk in the Atlantic Ocean (36°32′N 8°09′W) by SM UC-37 (Imperial German Navy).
Storebror	Norway	World War I: The barque was sunk by SMS Wolf (Imperial German Navy) in the South Atlantic.
HMT Teal	Royal Navy	The 118.1-foot (36.0 m), 165-ton steam minesweeping naval trawler was wrecked on rocks about a mile offshore to the north of Buckie, East Mucks, Moray Firth. She broke up in a storm sometime before daylight the next morning.
Wragby	United Kingdom	World War I: The cargo ship was shelled and sunk in the Atlantic Ocean 45 nautical miles (83 km) west by north of Cape Spartel, Morocco (35°57′N 6°49′W) by SM UC-37 (Imperial German Navy). Her crew survived.

== 5 January ==
List of shipwrecks: 5 January 1917
Ship	State	Description
Allie	United Kingdom	World War I: The cargo ship was scuttled in the Bay of Biscay off the Île de Ré, Charente-Maritime (46°15′N 1°48′W) by SM UB-39 (Imperial German Navy). Her crew survived.
Asta	Norway	World War I: The coaster was sunk in the English Channel 25 nautical miles (46 km) north of the Casquets, Channel Islands (50°09′N 2°34′W) by SM UB-37 (Imperial German Navy). Her crew survived.
Case	Canada	The steamer sprung a leak in a storm in Lake Erie and was beached on Middle Sister Island. She caught fire, burned and broke up. Her cargo, engine and boilers were salvaged.
Combermere	Italy	World War I: The full-rigged ship was sunk in the Mediterranean Sea off Cabo de Gata, Almería, Spain by SM UC-37 (Imperial German Navy).
Danevirke	Denmark	World War I: The cargo ship was sunk in the Atlantic Ocean 10 nautical miles (19 km) off Ouessant, Finistère, France (49°14′N 4°17′W) by SM UB-18 (Imperial German Navy). Her crew survived.
Ebro	Denmark	World War I: The cargo ship was sunk in the Atlantic Ocean 75 nautical miles (139 km) west south west o the Créac'h Lighthouse, Finistère by SM U-82 (Imperial German Navy). Her crew survived.
Lesbian	United Kingdom	World War I: The cargo ship was shelled and sunk in the Mediterranean Sea 125 nautical miles (232 km) east by south of Malta (35°48′N 17°06′E) by SM U-35 (Imperial German Navy). Her crew survived, but her captain was taken as a prisoner of war.
Markland	Norway	World War I: The cargo ship was sunk in the Bay of Biscay 10 nautical miles (19 km) west of the Île de Ré by SM UB-39 (Imperial German Navy). Her crew survived.
Salvatore Padre	Italy	World War I: The sailing vessel was sunk in the Mediterranean Sea by SM U-35 (Imperial German Navy).

== 6 January ==
List of shipwrecks: 6 January 1917
Ship	State	Description
Alphonse Conseil	France	World War I: The cargo ship was torpedoed and sunk in the Atlantic Ocean 180 nautical miles (330 km) west north west of A Coruña, Spain by SM U-48 (Imperial German Navy). Her crew survived.
Beaufront	United Kingdom	World War I: The cargo ship was torpedoed and sunk in the Atlantic Ocean 76 nautical miles (141 km) north west of Ouessant, Finistère by SM U-82 (Imperial German Navy). Her crew were rescued by Aldebaran (Sweden).
Hudworth	United Kingdom	World War I: The cargo ship was torpedoed and sunk in the Mediterranean Sea 94 nautical miles (174 km) east south east of Malta (35°31′N 16°24′E) by SM U-35 (Imperial German Navy). Her crew survived.
Ville du Havre	France	World War I: The cargo liner was sunk in the Atlantic Ocean 145 nautical miles (269 km) north west of Cape Villano, Spain (44°00′N 10°00′W) by SM U-48 (Imperial German Navy).

== 7 January ==
List of shipwrecks: 7 January 1917
Ship	State	Description
Borgholm	Norway	World War I: The cargo ship was sunk in the Atlantic Ocean 75 nautical miles (139 km) off Cape Finisterre, Spain (43°19′N 11°07′W) by SM U-48 (Imperial German Navy). Her crew survived.
Brenda	United Kingdom	World War I: The brigantine was shelled and sunk in the English Channel 10 nautical miles (19 km) south south west of Beachy Head, Sussex by SM UB-23 (Imperial German Navy). Her crew survived.
HMT Donside	Royal Navy	World War I: The naval trawler struck a mine placed by SM UC-4 (Imperial German Navy) and sank in the North Sea off Lowestoft, Suffolk (52°17′N 1°44′E) with the loss of four of her crew.
Evangelos	Greece	World War I: The cargo ship was sunk in the Atlantic Ocean 90 nautical miles (170 km) west of Cape Finisterre by SM U-48 (Imperial German Navy).
Hansi	Norway	World War I: The cargo ship was sunk in the English Channel 15 nautical miles (28 km) north north west of Île Vierge, Finistère, France (48°56′N 4°55′W) by SM UB-37 (Imperial German Navy). Her crew survived.
Mohacsfield	United Kingdom	World War I: The cargo ship was sunk in the Mediterranean Sea 40 nautical miles (74 km) south east by east of Malta by SM U-35 (Imperial German Navy) with the loss of three crew. Her captain was taken as a prisoner of war.
Radnorshire	United Kingdom	The cargo ship was scuttled in the Atlantic Ocean 110 nautical miles (200 km) east of Pernambuco, Brazil by SMS Möwe (Imperial German Navy).
Rosalia L.	Italy	World War I: The cargo ship was sunk in the Mediterranean Sea off Malta (35°07′N 16°53′E) by SM U-32 (Imperial German Navy).

== 8 January ==
List of shipwrecks: 8 January 1917
Ship	State	Description
Andoni	United Kingdom	World War I: The cargo ship was torpedoed and sunk in the Mediterranean Sea 46 nautical miles (85 km) south east of Malta (35°19′N 15°07′E) by SM U-35 (Imperial German Navy) with the loss of three crew.
HMT Cape Colony	Royal Navy	World War I: The naval trawler struck a mine placed by SM UC-11 (Imperial German Navy) and sank in the North Sea off Harwich, Essex (52°02′N 1°46′E). Her crew survived.
Carrier F. Roberts	United States	The Schooner sank at Block Island, Rhode Island. Wreck later removed.
Lynfield	United Kingdom	World War I: The collier was sunk in the Mediterranean Sea 32 nautical miles (59 km) south east by south of Malta by SM U-35 (Imperial German Navy) with the loss of a crew member. Her captain was taken as a prisoner of war. Survivors were rescued by Chili (France).

== 9 January ==
List of shipwrecks: 9 January 1917
Ship	State	Description
Alexandria	United Kingdom	World War I: The cargo ship was damaged in the Atlantic Ocean south west of the Fastnet Rock by SM U-84 (Imperial German Navy). She was beached but was later refloated.
Baynesk	United Kingdom	World War I: The cargo ship was torpedoed and sunk in the Mediterranean Sea 130 nautical miles (240 km) north by west of Alexandria, Egypt 33°45′N 29°24′E by SM U-39 (Imperial German Navy) with the loss of seven crew.
HMS Cornwallis	Royal Navy	HMS Cornwallis World War I: The Duncan-class pre-dreadnought battleship was torpedoed and sunk in the Mediterranean Sea off Malta by SM U-32 (Imperial German Navy) with the loss of fifteen of her 720 crew.
Excellent	United Kingdom	World War I: The collier was shelled and sunk in the North Sea 40 nautical miles (74 km) north east of Noup Head, Orkney Islands (59°37′N 4°19′W) by SM U-70 (Imperial German Navy). Her crew survived but her captain was taken as a prisoner of war.
Fernebo	Sweden	World War I: The cargo ship struck a mine laid by SM UC-19 (Imperial German Navy) and broke in two in the North Sea 3 nautical miles (5.6 km) north east of Cromer, Norfolk, United Kingdom. Both parts came ashore. Her crew were rescued by the Cromer Lifeboat. Fernebo was declared a total loss. One casualty.
Gladys Royle	United Kingdom	World War I: The cargo ship was scuttled in the Atlantic Ocean 120 nautical miles (220 km) south of Santa Maria, The Azores, Portugal by SMS Seeadler (Imperial German Navy).
Minieh	United Kingdom	World War I: The collier was scuttled in the Atlantic Ocean 170 nautical miles (310 km) east northeast of Pernamboco, Brazil by SMS Möwe (Imperial German Navy).
Pyrin	Greece	The cargo ship was abandoned in the North Sea off the coast of Norfolk. Her crew were rescued by the Cromer Lifeboat.
Schwarzwald	Imperial German Navy	World War I: The minesweeper struck a mine in the North Sea north of Borkum Reef and sank.

== 10 January ==
List of shipwrecks: 10 January 1917
Ship	State	Description
Bergenhus	Norway	World War I: The cargo ship was sunk in the Irish Sea south east of Ireland (48°55′N 10°05′W) by SM U-84 (Imperial German Navy). Her crew were rescued by Borinquem (United States).
Brookwood	United Kingdom	World War I: The cargo ship was shelled and sunk in the Atlantic Ocean 210 nautical miles (390 km) north by west of Cape Finisterre, Spain (45°50′N 11°50′W) by SM U-79 (Imperial German Navy) with the loss of two of her crew.
Lundy Island	United Kingdom	World War I: The cargo ship was shelled and sunk in the Atlantic Ocean 190 nautical miles (350 km) south east of Santa Maria, Azores, Portugal by SMS Seeadler (Imperial German Navy). One of her crew was taken as a prisoner of war.
Majestic	United Kingdom	The 103-foot (31 m), 159-ton steam trawler was wrecked at Robin Hood's Bay, Yorkshire.
Netherby Hall	United Kingdom	World War I: The cargo ship was scuttled in the Atlantic Ocean 300 nautical miles (560 km) east by north of Pernambuco, Brazil by SMS Möwe (Imperial German Navy).
Tholma	Germany	World War I: The cargo ship was scuttled in the Atlantic Ocean (43°23′N 11°01′W). Formerly a Norwegian cargo ship, she had been captured on 8 January by SM U-48 (Imperial German Navy).
Tuborg	Denmark	World War I: The cargo ship was sunk in the English Channel (49°38′N 4°45′W) by SM UB-37 (Imperial German Navy). Her crew survived.

== 11 January ==
List of shipwrecks: 11 January 1917
Ship	State	Description
HMS Ben-my-Chree	Royal Navy	Ben-my-Chree World War I: The aircraft carrying cruiser was shelled and sunk off Kastelorizo, Greece by Ottoman shore based artillery. All 250 crew were rescued. Ben-my-Chree was refloated in 1920 but found to be a total loss and was scrapped in 1923.
Ole Bull	Norway	World War I: The cargo ship struck a mine and sank in the North Sea off Great Yarmouth, Norfolk, United Kingdom. Her crew survived.

== 12 January ==
List of shipwrecks: 12 January 1917
Ship	State	Description
Auchencrag	United Kingdom	World War I: The cargo ship was torpedoed and sunk in the Atlantic Ocean 20 nautical miles (37 km) west of Ouessant, Finistère, France (48°28′N 5°35′W) by SM U-84 (Imperial German Navy) with the loss of four of her crew.
Brentwood	United Kingdom	World War I: The cargo ship struck a mine placed by SM UC-43 (Imperial German Navy) and sank in the North Sea 4 nautical miles (7.4 km) east north east of Whitby, Yorkshire with the loss of two of her crew.
Emeraude	France	World War I: The schooner was sunk off the coast of Spain by SM U-48 (Imperial German Navy).
Saint Michel	France	World War I: The schooner was scuttled in the English Channel off the Owers Lightship (United Kingdom) (50°31′N 0°25′W) by SM UC-18 (Imperial German Navy). Her crew were rescued by a Royal Navy destroyer.
Vestfold	Norway	World War I: The cargo ship was sunk in the Atlantic Ocean 70 nautical miles (130 km) west north west of Cape Finisterre, Spain (43°46′N 11°49′W) by SM U-48 (Imperial German Navy). Her crew survived.

== 13 January ==
List of shipwrecks: 13 January 1917
Ship	State	Description
USS Milwaukee	United States Navy	USS Milwaukee. The St. Louis-class ran aground at Eureka, California. All 438 crew were rescued. Milwaukee broke in two in November 1918 and was a total loss. Her remains were scrapped in situ.
Solvang	Norway	World War I: The cargo ship was sunk in the Atlantic Ocean 30 nautical miles (56 km) north of Cape Finisterre, Spain (43°17′N 9°25′W) by SM U-59 (Imperial German Navy). Her crew survived.
Toftwood	United Kingdom	World War I The cargo ship was torpedoed and sunk in the English Channel 24 nautical miles (44 km) north of Sept Îles, Côtes-du-Nord, France (49°15′N 3°43′W) by SM UC-18 (Imperial German Navy). Her crew survived.

== 14 January ==
List of shipwrecks: 14 January 1917
Ship	State	Description
Martin	United Kingdom	World War I: The cargo ship shelled and was sunk in the Atlantic Ocean 8 nautical miles (15 km) north by west of Ouessant, Finistère, France (48°36′N 5°08′W) by SM UC-18 (Imperial German Navy). Her crew survived.
Norma	Denmark	World War I: The cargo ship was sunk in the English Channel (50°13′N 2°00′W) by SM UB-37 (Imperial German Navy). Her crew survived.
Sydney	France	World War I: The cargo ship was shelled and sunk in the Atlantic Ocean 90 nautical miles (170 km) north west of Cape Villano, Spain (44°13′N 10°41′W) by SM U-48 (Imperial German Navy). Her crew survived.
Tsukuba	Imperial Japanese Navy	The Tsukuba-class cruiser exploded and sank at Yokosuka, Kanagawa with the loss of 305 of her 879 crew.
SM UB-37	Imperial German Navy	World War I: The Type UB II submarine was shelled and sunk in the English Channel 50°07′N 1°47′W by HMS Penshurst (Royal Navy) with the loss of all 21 crew.

== 15 January ==
List of shipwrecks: 15 January 1917
Ship	State	Description
Bernadette	France	World War I: The brig was scuttled in the Bay of Biscay 8 nautical miles (15 km) south south east of the Glénan Islands, Finistère (47°27′N 3°50′W) by SM UC-18 (Imperial German Navy). Her crew survived.
Brabant	Norway	World War I: The cargo ship struck a mine placed by SM UC-43 (Imperial German Navy) and sank in the North Sea 2 nautical miles (3.7 km) off Flamborough Head, Yorkshire, United Kingdom with the loss of three of her crew.
Esperanca	Norway	World War I: The cargo ship was captured in the Atlantic Ocean by SM U-48 (Imperial German Navy). She was scuttled the next day 165 nautical miles (306 km) north of Cape Finisterre, Spain.
Garfield	United Kingdom	World War I: The tanker was torpedoed and sunk in the Mediterranean Sea 60 nautical miles (110 km) north east by north of Alexandria, Egypt (36°05′N 19°57′E) by SM U-39 (Imperial German Navy). Her crew survived, but her captain was taken as a prisoner of war.
Graafjeld	Norway	World War I: The coaster struck a mine and sank in the North Sea 3 nautical miles (5.6 km) east of Flamborough Head. Her crew survived.
Independant	France	World War I: The sailing vessel was scuttled in the Atlantic Ocean 20 nautical miles (37 km) north west of Ouessant, Finistère by SM UB-38 (Imperial German Navy). Her crew survived; they were rescued by a Royal Navy destroyer.
Kinpurney	United Kingdom	World War I: The full-rigged ship was torpedoed and sunk in the Atlantic Ocean 110 nautical miles (200 km) west of the Bishop Rock, Isles of Scilly (49°20′N 9°10′W) by SM U-84 (Imperial German Navy). Her crew survived.
Omsk	Denmark	World War I: The cargo ship was sunk in the Atlantic Ocean 90 nautical miles (170 km) west of the Bishop's Rock (49°12′N 8°39′W) by SM U-84 (Imperial German Navy). Her crew survived.
Otto	Norway	World War I: The cargo ship was sunk in the Bay of Biscay 10 nautical miles (19 km) north west of Belle Île, Morbihan, France (47°32′N 3°41′W) by SM UC-18 (Imperial German Navy). Her crew survived.
Port Nicholson	United Kingdom	World War I: The cargo liner struck a mine placed by SM UC-1 (Imperial German Navy) and sank in the North Sea 15 nautical miles (28 km) west of Dunkirk, Pas-de-Calais, France (51°01′45″N 1°58′15″E) with the loss of two of her crew.

== 16 January ==
List of shipwrecks: 16 January 1917
Ship	State	Description
Baron Sempill	United Kingdom	World War I: The cargo ship was scuttled in the Atlantic Ocean 180 nautical miles (330 km) south west of the Fastnet Rock (48°49′N 11°45′W) by SM U-44 (Imperial German Navy). Her crew survived.
Brenn	France	World War I: The barque was scuttled in the Atlantic Ocean 90 nautical miles (170 km) north of Cape Ortegal, Spain (45°25′N 7°49′W) by SM U-59 (Imperial German Navy).
City of Tampico	Norway	World War I: The cargo ship was sunk in the Bay of Biscay 5 nautical miles (9.3 km) south south east of Penmarc'h, Finistère, France (47°43′N 4°19′W) by SM UC-18 (Imperial German Navy). Her crew survived.
Manuel	Spain	World War I: The cargo ship was sunk in the Atlantic Ocean 80 nautical miles (150 km) west of Ouessant, Finistère by SM UB-38 (Imperial German Navy). Her crew survived.

== 17 January ==
List of shipwrecks: 17 January 1917
Ship	State	Description
HMT Amplify	Royal Navy	The naval trawler was lost on this date.
Jeune France	France	World War I: The ship was sunk in the Atlantic Ocean 25 nautical miles (46 km) west north west of Ouessant, Finistère by SM UC-18 (Imperial German Navy).
John W. Davidson	United States	The barge was damaged in a collision with Gaston (flag unknown) off Lambert's Point, Virginia, became waterlogged and was beached.
Valle	Spain	World War I: The cargo ship was sunk in the Atlantic Ocean 10 nautical miles (19 km) south west of Ouessant by SM UC-18 (Imperial German Navy). Her crew were rescued by Kurt (Sweden).

== 18 January ==
List of shipwrecks: 18 January 1917
Ship	State	Description
Asp	Norway	World War I: The cargo ship was sunk in the Atlantic Ocean 45 nautical miles (83 km) north west of the Isles of Scilly, United Kingdom (50°37′N 6°43′W) by SM UB-38 (Imperial German Navy). Her crew survived.
Dagmar	Denmark	World War I: The cargo ship struck a mine and sank in the North Sea off Orfordness, Suffolk, United Kingdom (52°07′30″N 1°45′30″E). Her crew survived.
HMS Ferret	Royal Navy	World War I: The Acheron-class destroyer was torpedoed and damaged in the English Channel south east of St. Catherine's Point, Isle of Wight by SM UC-21 (Imperial German Navy) with the loss of a crew member. She was repaired and returned to service.
Louise	France	World War I: The sailing vessel was sunk in the Bay of Biscay 14 nautical miles (26 km) south south west of the Glénan Islands, Finistère by SM UC-18 (Imperial German Navy).
Louis Joseph	France	World War I: The auxiliary schooner was sunk in the Bay of Biscay six nautical miles (11 km) east south east of Guilvinec, Finistère by SM UC-18 (Imperial German Navy).
Manchester Inventor	United Kingdom	World War I: The cargo ship was torpedoed and sunk in the Atlantic Ocean 50 nautical miles (93 km) north west by west of the Fastnet Rock by SM U-57 (Imperial German Navy). Her crew survived.
Pilot	Canada	The ferry was wrecked on Red Island in the St. Lawrence River.
Taormina	Italy	World War I: The cargo ship was sunk in the English Channel 60 nautical miles (110 km) off Jersey, Channel Islands by SM UC-16 (Imperial German Navy). Her crew survived.
Unknown towboat	Unknown	The towboat was sunk in a collision with China (United States) in the Shimonoseki Straits, Sea of Japan. Lost with all six hands.

== 19 January ==
List of shipwrecks: 19 January 1917
Ship	State	Description
Anna	Norway	World War I: The cargo ship was scuttled in the Atlantic Ocean 80 nautical miles (150 km) west of Ouessant, Finistère, France (48°29′N 7°12′W) by SM UC-16 (Imperial German Navy). Her crew survived.
HMS E36	Royal Navy	The E-class submarine collided with HMS E43 (Royal Navy) in the North Sea off Harwich, Essex and sank with the loss of all 30 crew.
Gaea	Norway	World War I: The cargo ship was sunk in the Bay of Biscay 21 nautical miles (39 km) north by east of Bilbao, Biscay, Spain by SM U-59 (Imperial German Navy). Her crew survived.
Joseph Rosalie	France	World War I: The sailing vessel was sunk in the English Channel 40 nautical miles (74 km) north west of the Roches-Douvres Lighthouse, Côtes-du-Nord by SM UC-21 (Imperial German Navy).
Klampenborg	Denmark	World War I: The cargo ship was sunk in the Bay of Biscay off Audierne, Finistère, France (47°56′N 4°42′W) by SM UC-18 (Imperial German Navy). Her crew survived.
Lilian H.	United Kingdom	World War I: The schooner was scuttled in the Atlantic Ocean 15 nautical miles (28 km) south by east of the Old Head of Kinsale, County Cork by SM UB-38 (Imperial German Navy). Her crew survived.
Marietta di Giorgio	Norway	World War I: The coaster was scuttled in the Atlantic Ocean 70 nautical miles (130 km) south west of Ouessant (47°38′N 6°23′W) by SM UC-21 (Imperial German Navy). Her crew survived.
Nailsea Court	United Kingdom	World War I: The cargo ship was torpedoed and sunk in the Atlantic Ocean 32 nautical miles (59 km) west of the Skelligs by SM U-48 (Imperial German Navy). Her crew survived.
Parahyba	Uruguay	World War I: The cargo ship was sunk in the Bay of Biscay 5 nautical miles (9.3 km) south of the La Vieille Lighthouse, Finistère (47°57′N 4°45′W) by SM UC-18 (Imperial German Navy). Her crew survived.
Reinunga	Norway	World War I: The cargo ship was sunk in the Atlantic Ocean 70 nautical miles (130 km) south west of the Bishop Rock, Isles of Scilly, United Kingdom by SM UC-16 (Imperial German Navy). Her crew survived.
Theresdal	Norway	World War I: The cargo ship was sunk in the Atlantic Ocean off Ouessant by SM UC-16 (Imperial German Navy). Her crew survived.
Tremeadow	United Kingdom	World War I: The cargo ship was shelled and sunk in the Atlantic Ocean 35 nautical miles (65 km) north east by north of Ouessant (49°03′N 4°50′W) by SM UC-21 (Imperial German Navy). Her crew survived.

== 20 January ==
List of shipwrecks: 20 January 1917
Ship	State	Description
Bulgarian	United Kingdom	World War I: The cargo ship was torpedoed and sunk in the Atlantic Ocean 50 nautical miles (93 km) west of the Fastnet Rock by SM U-84 (Imperial German Navy) with the loss of fourteen of her crew. Nine survivors were taken as prisoners of war.
Dalzelline	United States	The tug went ashore on Plum Island, New York.
Kisagata Maru No.3	Japan	World War I: The cargo ship was sunk in the Bay of Biscay by SM UC-21 (Imperial German Navy). Her crew survived.
Neuquen	United Kingdom	World War I: The cargo ship was torpedoed and sunk in the Atlantic Ocean 20 nautical miles (37 km) north west by west of the Skellig Islands (51°50′N 10°52′W) by SM U-84 (Imperial German Navy) with the loss of eighteen crew.
HMT New Comet	Royal Navy	World War I: The naval trawler struck a mine placed by SM UC-4 (Imperial German Navy) and sank in the North Sea off Orfordness, Suffolk (52°07′30″N 1°43′40″E) with the loss of eight of her crew.
HMT Pansy	Royal Navy	The naval trawler was lost on this date.
Planudes	United Kingdom	World War I: The coaster struck a mine placed by SM UC-43 (Imperial German Navy) and sank in the North Sea off Whitby, Yorkshire with the loss of all eleven crew.
Standard	Denmark	World War I: The brigantine was sunk in the English Channel 13 nautical miles (24 km) off Portland Bill, Dorset, United Kingdom by SM UC-17 (Imperial German Navy). Her crew survived.

== 21 January ==
List of shipwrecks: 21 January 1917
Ship	State	Description
Charles Gounod	France	World War I: The barque was captured and sunk by SMS Seeadler (Imperial German Navy) north of St Paul Rocks.
Couronne	France	World War I: The schooner was scuttled in the Atlantic Ocean off the Isles of Scilly, United Kingdom by SM UC-16 (Imperial German Navy). Her crew took to the lifeboats but did not survive.
Ellen Roberts	United Kingdom	The schooner sprang a leak and foundered in the Irish Sea 5 nautical miles (9.3 km) south of Baltimore, County Cork.
Gladys	United Kingdom	World War I: The 129.9-foot (39.6 m), 275-ton steam trawler was captured, then shelled and sunk in the Atlantic Ocean 40 nautical miles (74 km) north west by west of Inishtrahull Island, County Donegal (55°46′N 8°20′W) by SM U-45 (Imperial German Navy). Her crew survived.
Leontine	France	World War I: The schooner was sunk in the Bay of Biscay by SM UC-21 (Imperial German Navy).
Lucy	United Kingdom	World War I: The 122.4-foot (37.3 m), 280-ton steam trawler was captured, then shelled and sunk in the Atlantic Ocean 40 nautical miles (74 km) north west by west of Inistrahull Island by SM U-45 (Imperial German Navy). Her crew survived.
Saint Pierre	France	World War I: The sailing vessel was sunk in the Bay of Biscay 14 nautical miles (26 km) west of the La Coubre Lighthouse, Charente-Maritime by SM UC-21 (Imperial German Navy).
Star of the Sea	United Kingdom	World War I: The trawler was shelled and sunk in the Atlantic Ocean 43 nautical miles (80 km) north west by west of Inishtrahull Island by SM U-45 (Imperial German Navy). Her crew survived.

== 22 January ==
List of shipwrecks: 22 January 1917
Ship	State	Description
Anna	France	World War I: The schooner was shelled and sunk in the English Channel off the coast of Finistère 49°12′N 4°26′W by SM U-53 (Imperial German Navy).
Aurelie	France	World War I: The sailing vessel was sunk in the English Channel (49°31′N 3°28′W) by SM UC-18 (Imperial German Navy).
Bearnais		World War I: The schooner was sunk in the Bay of Biscay off the La Coubre Lighthouse, Charente-Maritime (45°31′N 1°36′W) by SM UC-21 (Imperial German Navy).
Duc d'Aumale	France	World War I: The barque was scuttled in the Atlantic Ocean (45°21′N 8°50′W) by SM U-43 (Imperial German Navy). Her crew survived; they were taken on board U-43 and transferred to Storli (Norway) the next day.
Ethel	United Kingdom	World War I: The fishing smack was shelled and sunk in the English Channel 30 nautical miles (56 km) south south east of Start Point, Devon (49°50′N 3°54′W) by SM U-55 (Imperial German Navy). Her crew survived.
Euphrates	Belgium	World War I: The cargo ship was sunk in the Atlantic Ocean 200 nautical miles (370 km) south west of the Fastnet Rock by SM U-57 (Imperial German Navy).
Gaulois	France	World War I: The sailing vessel was sunk in the English Channel (49°05′N 5°14′W) by SM UC-17 (Imperial German Navy).
Kamma	Sweden	World War I: The cargo ship struck a mine placed by SM UC-40 (Imperial German Navy) and sank in the North Sea 1.5 nautical miles (2.8 km) east of Blyth, Northumberland, United Kingdom. Four of the crew was killed.
Minho	Portugal	World War I: The sailing vessel was sunk in the Atlantic Ocean south west of the Fastnet Rock by SM U-57 (Imperial German Navy).
O. A. Brodin	Sweden	World War I: The cargo ship was sunk in the English Channel 16 nautical miles (30 km) north of Ouessant, Finistère by SM UC-17 (Imperial German Navy). Her crew survived.
Precurseur		World War I: The schooner was sunk in the Bay of Biscay south west of the La Coubre Lighthouse by SM UC-21 (Imperial German Navy).
Steinmachos	Greece	World War I: The cargo ship was sunk in the Bay of Biscay off the La Coubre Lighthouse (45°40′N 1°30′W) by SM UC-21 (Imperial German Navy). Her crew survived.
Trevean	United Kingdom	World War I: The cargo ship was scuttled in the Atlantic Ocean 240 nautical miles (440 km) south west by west of the Fastnet Rock (approximately 48°N 13°W) by SM U-57 (Imperial German Navy). Her crew survived, but three of them were taken as prisoners of war.
SM U-76	Imperial German Navy	The Type UE I submarine collided with a Russian trawler and sank in the Arctic Ocean (approximately 71°N 23°E) with the loss of a crew member.
Zeta	Netherlands	World War I: The cargo ship was torpedoed and sunk in the English Channel 18 nautical miles (33 km) south south west of The Lizard, Cornwall, United Kingdom(49°43′N 5°37′W) by SM U-53 (Imperial German Navy).

== 23 January ==
List of shipwrecks: 23 January 1917
Ship	State	Description
Clan Shaw	United Kingdom	World War I: The cargo ship struck a mine placed by SM UC-29 (Imperial German Navy) and sank in the North Sea off St Andrews, Fife (56°27′N 2°38′W) with the loss of two of her crew.
Donstad	Norway	World War I: The coaster was captured in the Atlantic Ocean 60 nautical miles (110 km) north north east of Cape Villiano, Spain by SM U-43 (Imperial German Navy). She was scuttled on 27 January 12 nautical miles (22 km) north by west of Cape Villiano. Her crew survived.
Eden	Russia	World War I: The sailing vessel was sunk in the Atlantic Ocean off the Isles of Scilly, United Kingdom by SM U-55 (Imperial German Navy) with the loss of all hands.
Egypte	Belgium	World War I: The cargo ship was sunk in the English Channel (48°18′N 6°10′W) by SM UC-17 (Imperial German Navy).
Jevington	United Kingdom	World War I: The cargo ship was torpedoed and sunk in the Atlantic Ocean 52 nautical miles (96 km) north west of Cape Ortegal, Spain (44°08′N 9°00′W) by SM U-43 (Imperial German Navy). Her crew survived.
Ophelia	France	World War I: The schooner was sunk in the Atlantic Ocean 80 nautical miles (150 km) west of Ouessant, Finistère by SM UC-17 (Imperial German Navy).
Salland	Netherlands	World War I: The cargo ship was sunk in the Atlantic Ocean south of the Wolf Rock, Cornwall, United Kingdom (48°50′N 6°40′W) by SM U-55 (Imperial German Navy).
Sardinia	Norway	World War I: The cargo ship was sunk in the Atlantic Ocean 100 nautical miles (190 km) off Ouessant (46°56′N 6°42′W) by SM U-59 (Imperial German Navy). Her crew survived.
HMS Simoom	Royal Navy	World War I: The R-class destroyer was torpedoed and badly damaged in the North Sea by SMS S50 (Imperial German Navy). 44 of her 82 crew were killed. The survivors were rescued by HMS Morris and the wreck sunk by a torpedo from HMS Nimrod (both Royal Navy).
Ymer	Norway	World War I: The cargo ship was sunk in the Bay of Biscay off the Île d'Yeu, Vendée, France by SM UC-16 (Imperial German Navy) with the loss of eighteen of her crew.

== 24 January ==
List of shipwrecks: 24 January 1917
Ship	State	Description
Dan	Denmark	World War I: The cargo ship was sunk in the Bay of Biscay 17 nautical miles (31 km) south of Belle Île, Morbihan, France (47°08′N 2°57′W) by SM UC-21 (Imperial German Navy).
Gladiateur	France	World War I: The fishing vessel was sunk in the Bay of Biscay by SM UC-21 (Imperial German Navy).
Loire III	France	World War I: The fishing vessel was sunk in the Bay of Biscay by SM UC-21 (Imperial German Navy).
Marie 3	France	World War I: The pilot boat was sunk in the Bay of Biscay by SM UC-21 (Imperial German Navy).
Perce	Canada	World War I: The schooner was captured and sunk by SMS Seeadler (Imperial German Navy) off Brazil.
Quebec	France	World War I: The cargo ship struck a mine and sank in the Gironde Estuary. Her crew survived.
Vega	Denmark	World War I: The brig was scuttled in the Bay of Biscay off Belle Île (46°40′N 2°38′W) by SM UC-21 (Imperial German Navy). Her crew survived.

== 25 January ==
List of shipwrecks: 25 January 1917
Ship	State	Description
HMS Laurentic	Royal Navy	World War I: The armed merchant cruiser struck two mines and sank in Lough Swilly with the loss of 354 of the 475 people on board.
Myrdal	Norway	World War I: The cargo ship was scuttled in the Bay of Biscay 4.5 nautical miles (8.3 km) south south east of Penmarc'h, Finistère, France (47°44′N 4°22′W) by SM UC-21 (Imperial German Navy). Her crew survived.
O. B. Suhr	Denmark	World War I: The cargo ship was scuttled in the North Sea (56°12′N 3°15′E) by SM UC-31 (Imperial German Navy). Her crew survived.
Sunniva	Norway	World War I: The coaster was sunk in the North Sea 120 nautical miles (220 km) east north east of the mouth of the Tyne by SM UC-29 (Imperial German Navy). Her crew survived.
Sylvie	France	World War I: The cargo ship was sunk in the Mediterranean Sea 190 nautical miles (350 km) south west of Cape Matapan, Greece (36°00′N 18°50′E) by SM U-38 (Imperial German Navy). Her crew survived.

== 26 January ==
List of shipwrecks: 26 January 1917
Ship	State	Description
Bisagno	Italy	World War I: The cargo ship was sunk in the Atlantic Ocean south of Ireland (48°42′N 11°26′W) by SM U-57 (Imperial German Navy). Her crew survived.
Dicax	Norway	World War I: The coaster was sunk in the North Sea 60 nautical miles (110 km) west of the Ryvingen Lighthouse, Vest-Agder by SM U-85 (Imperial German Navy). Her crew survived.
Matheran	United Kingdom	World War I: The cargo ship struck a mine and sank in the Atlantic Ocean 9 nautical miles (17 km) west of Dassen Island, South Africa with the loss of a crew member.
Tabasco	United Kingdom	World War I: The cargo ship was torpedoed and sunk in the Atlantic Ocean 55 nautical miles (102 km) west north west of the Skelligs (51°50′N 12°00′W) by SM U-45 (Imperial German Navy). Her crew survived.

== 27 January ==
List of shipwrecks: 27 January 1917
Ship	State	Description
Artist	United Kingdom	World War I: The collier was torpedoed and sunk in the Atlantic Ocean 58 nautical miles (107 km) west of the Smalls Lighthouse (51°20′N 7°00′W) by SM U-55 (Imperial German Navy) with the loss of 35 crew.

== 28 January ==
List of shipwrecks: 28 January 1917
Ship	State	Description
Alexandra	United Kingdom	World War I: The fishing vessel was scuttled in the North Sea 60 nautical miles (110 km) east of the Longstone Lighthouse, Northumberland by SM UC-31 (Imperial German Navy). Her crew survived, but her skipper was taken as a prisoner of war.
Amiral Magon	France	World War I: The troopship was torpedoed and sunk in the Mediterranean Ocean 160 nautical miles (300 km) west of Antikythera, Greece (35°49′N 20°02′E) by SM U-39 (Imperial German Navy) with the loss of 203 lives.
Argo	Norway	World War I: The cargo ship struck a mine and sank in the North Sea 1.5 nautical miles (2.8 km) south east of the Inner Dowsing Lightship (United Kingdom) (53°19′N 0°37′E) with the loss of nine of her crew.
Daisy	Denmark	World War I: The cargo ship was sunk in the Atlantic Ocean 60 nautical miles (110 km) north north west of Cape Ortegal, Spain by SM U-67 (Imperial German Navy). Her crew survived.
Egret	Russia	World War I: The cargo ship struck a mine and sank in the North Sea 5 nautical miles (9.3 km) south west of the Inner Dowsing Lightship (United Kingdom) (53°16′N 0°35′E).
Foz do Douro	Portugal	World War I: The cargo ship was sunk in the Atlantic Ocean 55 nautical miles (102 km) west of A Coruña, Spain by SM U-43 (Imperial German Navy).
Fulton	Norway	World War I: The cargo ship was captured in the Atlantic Ocean 40 nautical miles (74 km) north west of Cape Finisterre, Spain by SM U-43 (Imperial German Navy). She was scuttled the next day in Corcubion Bay. Her crew survived.
Heimland I	Norway	World War I: The cargo ship struck a mine and sank in the North sea 2 nautical miles (3.7 km) off the Inner Dowsing Lightship (United Kingdom) (53°17′40″N 0°36′03″E). Her crew survived.
HMT Jacamar	Royal Navy	The naval trawler collided with another vessel and sank in the English Channel off the Folkestone Lightship (United Kingdom).
Nueva Montana	Spain	World War I: The cargo ship was sunk in the Bay of Biscay off Point Penmarc'h, Finistère, France (47°38′N 5°15′W) by SM U-53 (Imperial German Navy). Her crew survived.
Perce	United Kingdom	World War I: The sailing vessel was shelled and sunk in the Atlantic Ocean 150 nautical miles (280 km) north east by east of the St Paul Rocks, Brazil by SMS Seeadler (Imperial German Navy).
HM Torpedo Boat 24	Royal Navy	The torpedo boat collided with a breakwater and sank at Dover, Kent.

== 29 January ==
List of shipwrecks: 29 January 1917
Ship	State	Description
Algorta	Spain	World War I: The cargo ship was sunk in the Atlantic Ocean 30 nautical miles (56 km) north west of Ouessant, Finistère, France by SM U-53 (Imperial German Navy). Her crew survived.
Edda	Sweden	World War I: The coaster was sunk in the North Sea (56°00′N 3°40′E) by SM UC-32 (Imperial German Navy). Her crew were rescued by Hird (Norway).
HMS K13	Royal Navy	The K-class submarine sank in Gareloch with the loss of 32 of the 80 people on board. She was subsequently salvaged, repaired and returned to service as HMS K22.
Punta Teno	Spain	World War I: The cargo ship was sunk in the Atlantic Ocean north west of Spain (44°00′N 7°25′W) by SM U-67 (Imperial German Navy). Her crew survived.
Shamrock	United Kingdom	World War I: The trawler was shelled and sunk in the North Sea 115 nautical miles (213 km) north north east of the Longstone Lighthouse, Northumberland by SM UC-31 (Imperial German Navy). Her crew survived.
Thistle	United Kingdom	World War I: The trawler was shelled and sunk in the North Sea 140 nautical miles (260 km) north east by north of the mouth of the River Tyne by SM UC-31 (Imperial German Navy). Her crew survived.

== 30 January ==
List of shipwrecks: 30 January 1917
Ship	State	Description
Euonymus	United Kingdom	World War I: The fishing smack was shelled and sunk in the Atlantic Ocean 34 nautical miles (63 km) off Trevose Head, Cornwall (50°30′N 5°31′W) by SM U-55 (Imperial German Navy). Her crew survived.
Helena and Samuel	United Kingdom	World War I: The fishing smack was shelled and sunk in the Atlantic Ocean 30 nautical miles (56 km) north north west of Trevose Head (51°00′N 5°34′W) by SM U-55 (Imperial German Navy). Her crew survived.
Marcelle	Belgium	World War I: The trawler was sunk in the Atlantic Ocean off north west by west of Trevose Head (50°45′N 5°30′W) by SM U-55 (Imperial German Navy). Her crew survived.
Merit	United Kingdom	World War I: The fishing smack was shelled and sunk in the Atlantic Ocean 20 nautical miles (37 km) north by east of Trevose Head (50°50′N 4°46′W) by SM U-55 (Imperial German Navy). Her crew survived.
Trevone	United Kingdom	World War I: The fishing smack was shelled and sunk in the Atlantic Ocean 30 nautical miles (56 km) north west of Trevose Head (50°50′N 5°30′W) by SM U-55 (Imperial German Navy) with the loss of two of her crew.
W.A.H.	United Kingdom	World War I: The fishing smack was shelled and sunk in the Atlantic Ocean 32 nautical miles (59 km) north west of Trevose Head (50°46′N 5°38′W) by SM U-55 (Imperial German Navy). Her crew survived.
Wetherill	United Kingdom	World War I: The fishing smack was shelled and sunk in the Atlantic Ocean 25 nautical miles (46 km) north north west of Trevose Head (50°50′N 5°30′W) by SM U-55 (Imperial German Navy). Her crew survived.

== 31 January ==
List of shipwrecks: 31 January 1917
Ship	State	Description
Dundee	Canada	World War I: The cargo ship was torpedoed and sunk in the Atlantic Ocean 10 nautical miles (19 km) west of St Ives, Cornwall (50°22′N 5°36′W) by SM U-55 (Imperial German Navy) with the loss of a crew member.
Epsilon	Netherlands	World War I: The cargo ship was sunk in the English Channel 0.75 nautical miles (1.39 km) south of St Anthony's Lighthouse, Cornwall, United Kingdom (50°08′N 5°01′W) by SM UC-17 (Imperial German Navy).
Famiglia	Italy	World War I: The cargo ship was captured in the Atlantic Ocean west of the Hebrides, United Kingdom by SM U-43 (Imperial German Navy). A prize crew was placed aboard. They scuttled the ship on 9 February when intercepted by HMS Moldavia (Royal Navy).
Hekla	Norway	World War I: The coaster was sunk in the Atlantic Ocean south west of the Wolf Rock, Cornwall, United Kingdom by SM U-53 (Imperial German Navy). Her crew survived.
Ida Duncan	United Kingdom	World War I: The tug struck a mine and sank in the North Sea off Middlesbrough, Yorkshire (54°39′00″N 1°07′15″W) with the loss of six of her crew.
HMML 197	Royal Navy	The motor launch was lost on this date.
Modiva	Norway	World War I: The cargo ship struck a mine and sank in the North Sea 14 nautical miles (26 km) south east of Flamborough Head, Yorkshire (53°46′N 0°17′E) with the loss of three of her crew.
Ravensbourne	United Kingdom	World War I: The cargo ship struck a mine, set by SM UC-31, and sank in the North Sea 8 nautical miles (15 km) south east of the mouth of the River Tyne (54°56′N 1°14′W) (Imperial German Navy) with the loss of three of her crew.
Rigel	Norway	World War I: The cargo ship was scuttled in the Atlantic Ocean 60 nautical miles (110 km) north west of Cape Villano, Spain by SM U-43 (Imperial German Navy). Her crew survived.
Saint Léon	France	World War I: The schooner was sunk in the Atlantic Ocean 12 nautical miles (22 km) north north west of the Pendeen Lighthouse, Cornwall (50°21′N 5°48′W) by SM U-55 (Imperial German Navy).
Tampico	United States	The steamer went ashore on Great Point Rip, Nantucket, Massachusetts. Later refloated.
Yvonne	France	World War I: The sailing vessel was sunk in the Atlantic Ocean off the Pendeen Lighthouse by SM U-55 (Imperial German Navy).

== Unknown date ==
List of shipwrecks: Unknown date 1917
Ship	State	Description
Agnes	United Kingdom	World War I: The trawler was sunk in the North Sea by a Kaiserliche Marine submarine. Her crew were taken as prisoners of war.
Ava	United Kingdom	World War I: The ship was torpedoed and sunk in the Atlantic Ocean by a Kaiserliche Marine submarine with the loss of 92 lives.
Lux	United Kingdom	World War I: The cargo ship was torpedoed and sunk in the Atlantic Ocean with the loss of 29 lives.
Vera	United Kingdom	World War I: The trawler was sunk in the North Sea by a Kaiserliche Marine submarine. Her crew were taken as prisoners of war.
