= SM U-48 =

German submersible

Coordinates: 51°11′N 1°31′E

- U-48 capturing the Russian transport Suchan on 6 October 1916

History

German Empire
- Name: U-48
- Ordered: 4 August 1914
- Builder: Kaiserliche Werft, Danzig
- Yard number: 26
- Launched: 3 October 1915
- Commissioned: 22 April 1916
- Fate: Scuttled 24 November 1917

General characteristics
- Class & type: Type U-43 submarine
- Displacement: 725 t (714 long tons) surfaced; 940 t (930 long tons) submerged
- Length: 65.00 m (213 ft 3 in) (o/a)
- Beam: 6.20 m (20 ft 4 in) (oa); 4.18 m (13 ft 9 in) (pressure hull)
- Height: 9.00 m (29 ft 6 in)
- Draught: 3.74 m (12 ft 3 in)
- Installed power: 2 × 2,000 PS (1,471 kW; 1,973 shp) surfaced; 2 × 1,200 PS (883 kW; 1,184 shp) submerged
- Propulsion: 2 shafts
- Speed: 15.2 knots (28.2 km/h; 17.5 mph) surfaced; 9.7 knots (18.0 km/h; 11.2 mph) submerged
- Range: 11,400 nmi (21,100 km; 13,100 mi) at 8 knots (15 km/h; 9.2 mph) surfaced; 51 nmi (94 km; 59 mi) at 5 knots (9.3 km/h; 5.8 mph) submerged
- Test depth: 50 m (164 ft 1 in)
- Complement: 36
- Armament: 6 × torpedo tubes (four bow, two stern); 8 torpedoes; 2 × 8.8 cm (3.5 in) SK L/30 deck gun

Service record
- Part of: III Flotilla; 8 June 1916 – 24 November 1917
- Commanders: Kptlt. Berndt Buß; 22 April 1916 – 9 March 1917; Oblt.z.S. Hinrich Hermann Hashagen; 10–16 March 1917; Kptlt. Karl Edeling; 17 March – 24 November 1917
- Operations: 8 patrols
- Victories: 34 merchant ships sunk (104,558 GRT); 1 merchant ship damaged (180 GRT); 2 merchant ships taken as prize (5,904 GRT)

SM U-48 (Note: "SM" stands for "Seiner Majestät" (English: His Majesty's) and combined with the U for Unterseeboot would be translated as His Majesty's Submarine.) was one of the 329 submarines serving in the Imperial German Navy in World War I. U-48 was engaged in the naval warfare and took part in the First Battle of the Atlantic.

On 24 November 1917 she ran aground on Goodwin Sands. There she was fired on by HMS Gipsy. U-48 was scuttled and abandoned. In violation of the Hague Conventions of 1899 and 1907, HMS Gipsy continued to fire, killing an additional 19 survivors. Only 17 survived to be taken prisoner. Or, she fouled an anti-submarine net and drifted aground on the Goodwin Sands, Kent, United Kingdom. She was attacked at daylight by Naval drifters HMT Paramount, HMT Majesty, and HMT Present Help all ((Royal Navy)). She was able to drive them off, but they were reinforced by Naval drifters HMT Acceptable, HMT Feasible, HMT Lord Claud Hamilton, and destroyer HMS Gipsy all (Royal Navy). She was then scuttled with explosives with the loss of her Captain and eighteen of her 36 crew, 17 taken as POWs.

== Summary of raiding history ==
Date	Name	Nationality	Tonnage (Note: Tonnages are in gross register tons)	Fate
6 August 1916	Pendennis	United Kingdom	2,123	Captured as prize
2 October 1916	Lotusmere	United Kingdom	3,911	Sunk
4 October 1916	Brink	Norway	1,391	Sunk
6 October 1916	Suchan	Russian Empire	3,781	Captured as prize
6 October 1916	Tuva	Sweden	2,270	Sunk
29 December 1916	Tuskar	Russian Empire	3,042	Sunk
6 January 1917	Alphonse Conseil	France	1,591	Sunk
6 January 1917	Ville Du Havre	France	5,026	Sunk
7 January 1917	Borgholm	Norway	1,719	Sunk
7 January 1917	Evangelos	Greece	3,773	Sunk
8 January 1917	Tholma	Norway	1,896	Sunk
12 January 1917	Emeraude	France	183	Sunk
12 January 1917	Vestfold	Norway	1,883	Sunk
14 January 1917	Sydney	France	2,695	Sunk
16 January 1917	Esperanca	Norway	4,428	Sunk
19 January 1917	Nailsea Court	United Kingdom	3,295	Sunk
3 March 1917	Connaught	United Kingdom	2,646	Sunk
4 March 1917	Adelaide	United Kingdom	180	Damaged
4 March 1917	The Macbain	United Kingdom	291	Sunk
7 March 1917	Navarra	Norway	1,261	Sunk
9 March 1917	Abeja	United Kingdom	174	Sunk
9 March 1917	East Point	United Kingdom	5,234	Sunk
12 March 1917	Guerveur	France	2,596	Sunk
12 May 1917	San Onofre	United Kingdom	9,717	Sunk
13 May 1917	Jessmore	United Kingdom	3,911	Sunk
15 May 1917	Meuse	France	4,075	Sunk
17 May 1917	Margareta	Russian Empire	1,873	Sunk
21 May 1917	Lynton	Russian Empire	2,531	Sunk
21 May 1917	Madura	Norway	1,096	Sunk
13 July 1917	Gibel-Yedid	United Kingdom	949	Sunk
14 July 1917	Exford	United Kingdom	5,886	Sunk
15 July 1917	Torcello	United Kingdom	2,929	Sunk
16 July 1917	Asama	United Kingdom	284	Sunk
31 August 1917	Westbury	United Kingdom	3,097	Sunk
7 September 1917	Minnehaha	United Kingdom	13,714	Sunk
9 September 1917	Elsa	Denmark	1,236	Sunk
15 September 1917	Rollesby	United Kingdom	3,955	Sunk

== Bibliography ==
- Gröner, Erich; Jung, Dieter; Maass, Martin (1991). U-boats and Mine Warfare Vessels. German Warships 1815–1945. Vol. 2. Translated by Thomas, Keith; Magowan, Rachel. London: Conway Maritime Press. ISBN 0-85177-593-4.
- Rössler, Eberhard (1981). The U-boat : the evolution and technical history of German submarines. London: Cassell. ISBN 0304361208.
