= SM UC-4 =

German Type UC I submarine

History

German Empire
- Name: UC-4
- Ordered: November 1914
- Builder: AG Vulcan, Hamburg
- Yard number: 48
- Launched: 6 June 1915
- Commissioned: 10 June 1915
- Fate: Scuttled off Flanders, 5 October 1918

General characteristics
- Class & type: Type UC I submarine
- Displacement: 168 t (165 long tons), surfaced; 183 t (180 long tons), submerged
- Length: 33.99 m (111 ft 6 in) o/a; 29.62 m (97 ft 2 in) pressure hull
- Beam: 3.15 m (10 ft 4 in)
- Draft: 3.04 m (10 ft)
- Propulsion: 1 × propeller shaft; 1 × 6-cylinder, 4-stroke diesel engine, 90 PS (66 kW; 89 bhp); 1 × electric motor, 175 PS (129 kW; 173 shp)
- Speed: 6.20 knots (11.48 km/h; 7.13 mph), surfaced; 5.22 knots (9.67 km/h; 6.01 mph), submerged
- Range: 780 nmi (1,440 km; 900 mi) at 5 knots (9.3 km/h; 5.8 mph) surfaced; 50 nmi (93 km; 58 mi) at 4 knots (7.4 km/h; 4.6 mph) submerged
- Test depth: 50 m (160 ft)
- Complement: 14
- Armament: 6 × 100 cm (39 in) mine tubes; 12 × UC 120 mines; 1 × 8 mm (0.31 in) machine gun

Service record
- Part of: Baltic Flotilla; 11 July 1915 – 4 February 1916; Flandern Flotilla; 4 February – 19 March 1916; Baltic Flotilla; 19 March – 30 September 1916; Flandern / Flandern I Flotilla; 30 September 1916 – 2 October 1918
- Commanders: Oblt.z.S. Karl Vesper; 10 June – 28 December 1915; Oblt.z.S. Friedrich Moecke; 29 December 1915 – 19 March 1916; Oblt.z.S. Max Hamm; 20 March – 15 August 1916; Oblt.z.S. Ulrich Pilzecker; 16 August – 14 September 1916; Oblt.z.S. Gustav Buch; 15 September – 20 October 1916; Oblt.z.S. Hans Howaldt; 21 October – 26 November 1916; Oblt.z.S. Georg Reimarus; 27 November 1916 – 11 May 1917; Oblt.z.S. Oskar Steckelberg; 12 – 20 May 1917; Oblt.z.S. Georg Reimarus; 21 – 29 May 1917; Oblt.z.S. Erich Hecht; 30 May – 12 September 1917; Oblt.z.S. Walter Schmitz; 13 September 1917 – 19 January 1918; Oblt.z.S. Kurt Loch; 20 January – 26 February 1918; Oblt.z.S. Ernst Berlin; 27 February – 21 April 1918; Oblt.z.S. Eberhard Schmidt; 22 April – 2 October 1918
- Operations: 73 patrols
- Victories: 21 merchant ships sunk (33,518 GRT); 1 warship sunk (6,136 tons); 14 auxiliary warships sunk (5,134 GRT); 2 merchant ships damaged (9,441 GRT)

SM UC-4 was a German Type UC I minelayer submarine or U-boat in the German Imperial Navy (German: Kaiserliche Marine) during World War I. The U-boat had been ordered by November 1914 and was launched on 6 June 1915. She was commissioned into the German Imperial Navy on 10 June 1915 as SM UC-4. (Note: "SM" stands for "Seiner Majestät" (English: His Majesty's) and combined with the U for Unterseeboot would be translated as His Majesty's Submarine.) Mines laid by UC-4 in her 73 patrols were credited with sinking 36 ships. UC-4 was scuttled off the coast of Flanders during the German evacuation on 5 October 1918.

== Design ==
A Type UC I submarine, UC-4 had a displacement of 168 tonnes (165 long tons) when at the surface and 183 tonnes (180 long tons) while submerged. She had a length overall of 33.99 m (111 ft 6 in), a beam of 3.15 m (10 ft 4 in), and a draught of 3.04 m (10 ft). The submarine was powered by one Daimler-Motoren-Gesellschaft six-cylinder, four-stroke diesel engine producing 90 metric horsepower (66 kW; 89 shp), an electric motor producing 175 metric horsepower (129 kW; 173 shp), and one propeller shaft. She was capable of operating at a depth of 50 metres (160 ft).

The submarine had a maximum surface speed of 6.20 knots (11.48 km/h; 7.13 mph) and a maximum submerged speed of 5.22 knots (9.67 km/h; 6.01 mph). When submerged, she could operate for 50 nautical miles (93 km; 58 mi) at 4 knots (7.4 km/h; 4.6 mph); when surfaced, she could travel 780 nautical miles (1,440 km; 900 mi) at 5 knots (9.3 km/h; 5.8 mph). UC-4 was fitted with six 100 centimetres (39 in) mine tubes, twelve UC 120 mines, and one 8 millimetres (0.31 in) machine gun. She was built by AG Vulcan Stettin and her complement was fourteen crew members.

== Summary of raiding history ==
| Date | Name | Nationality | Tonnage (Note: Merchant ship tonnages are in gross register tons. Military vessels are listed by tons displacement.) | Fate |
|---|---|---|---|---|
| 15 August 1915 | Ladoga | Imperial Russian Navy | 6,136 | Sunk |
| 16 August 1915 | Linnea (n-1) | Imperial Russian Navy | 739 | Sunk |
| 12 February 1916 | Aduatiek | Belgium | 2,221 | Sunk |
| 12 February 1916 | Cedarwood | United Kingdom | 654 | Sunk |
| 13 February 1916 | Tergestea | United Kingdom | 4,308 | Sunk |
| 29 February 1916 | Den of Ogil | United Kingdom | 5,689 | Damaged |
| 27 October 1916 | Bygdo | Norway | 2,345 | Sunk |
| 28 October 1916 | Sparta | United Kingdom | 480 | Sunk |
| 9 November 1916 | Sunniside | United Kingdom | 447 | Sunk |
| 25 November 1916 | HMT Burnley | Royal Navy | 275 | Sunk |
| 3 December 1916 | HMT Remarko | Royal Navy | 245 | Sunk |
| 5 December 1916 | HMT Tervani | Royal Navy | 457 | Sunk |
| 7 January 1917 | HMT Donside | Royal Navy | 182 | Sunk |
| 18 January 1917 | Dagmar | Denmark | 758 | Sunk |
| 20 January 1917 | HMT New Comet | Royal Navy | 177 | Sunk |
| 13 February 1917 | HMT Sisters Melville | Royal Navy | 260 | Sunk |
| 23 February 1917 | Grenadier | United Kingdom | 1,004 | Sunk |
| 11 March 1917 | Kwasind | United Kingdom | 2,211 | Sunk |
| 12 March 1917 | Ambient | United Kingdom | 1,517 | Sunk |
| 12 March 1917 | Pontypridd | United Kingdom | 1,556 | Sunk |
| 3 June 1917 | Giralda | United Kingdom | 46 | Sunk |
| 4 July 1917 | Chrysolite | United Kingdom | 57 | Sunk |
| 7 July 1917 | HMT Kelvin | Royal Navy | 322 | Sunk |
| 20 July 1917 | HMS Queen of the North | Royal Navy | 594 | Sunk |
| 5 September 1917 | HMT Eros | Royal Navy | 286 | Sunk |
| 20 October 1917 | HMT Vitality | Royal Navy | 202 | Sunk |
| 11 November 1917 | Lapwing | United Kingdom | 1,192 | Sunk |
| 13 November 1917 | Axminster | United Kingdom | 1,905 | Sunk |
| 23 December 1917 | Grantley Hall | United Kingdom | 4,008 | Sunk |
| 25 February 1918 | Rubio | United Kingdom | 2,395 | Sunk |
| 26 February 1918 | Berwen | United Kingdom | 3,752 | Damaged |
| 5 March 1918 | Coalgas | United Kingdom | 2,257 | Sunk |
| 5 March 1918 | Estrella | United Kingdom | 1,740 | Sunk |
| 5 March 1918 | Tusnastabb | Norway | 1,136 | Sunk |
| 12 April 1918 | Lonhelen | United Kingdom | 1,281 | Sunk |
| 20 April 1918 | HMT Numitor | Royal Navy | 242 | Sunk |
| 25 April 1918 | HMS St. Seiriol | Royal Navy | 928 | Sunk |
| 26 June 1918 | HMT Achilles II | Royal Navy | 225 | Sunk |
