= SM U-43 (Germany) =

1914 U-43-class submarine

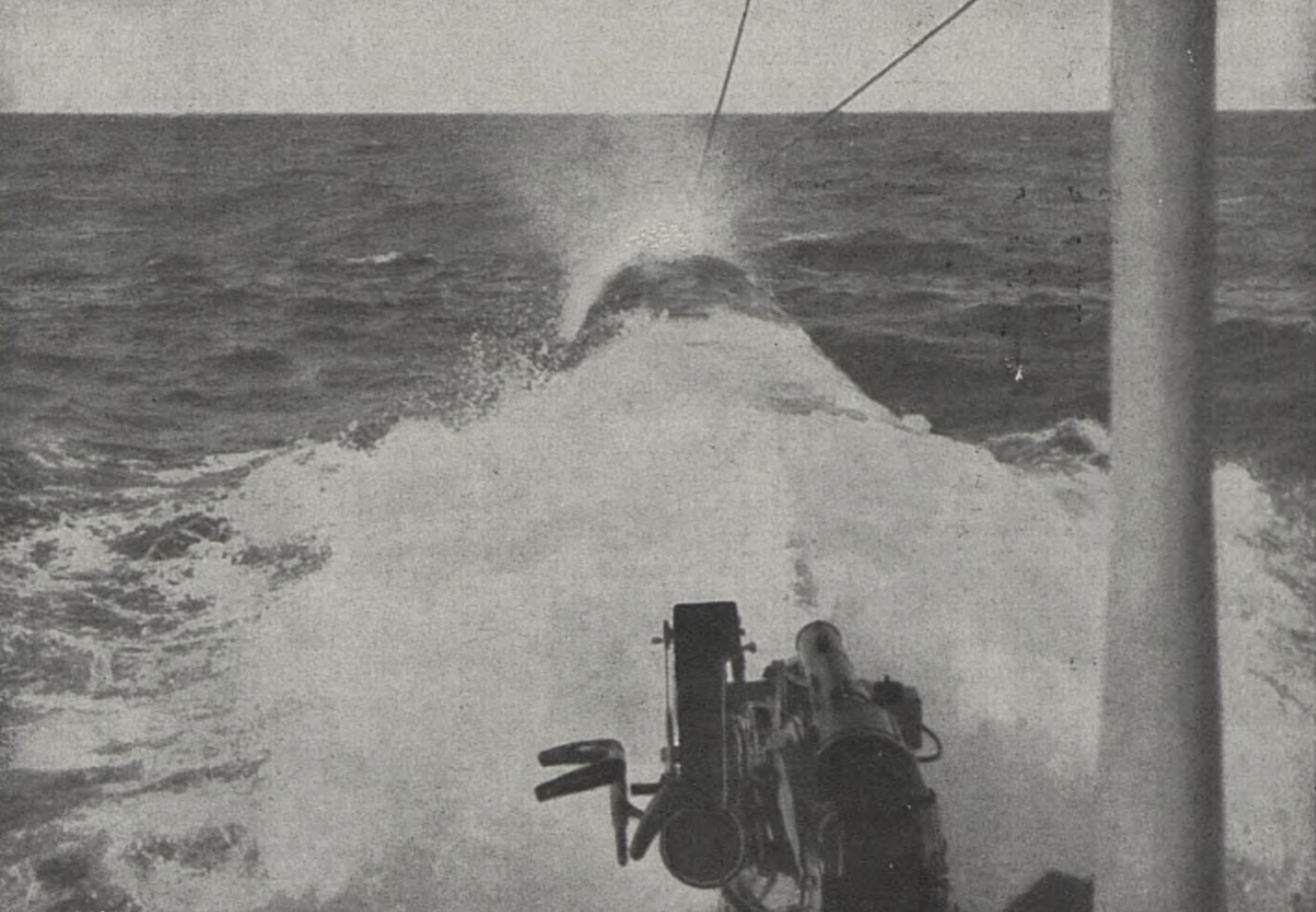
- SM U-43 cruising the North Sea, October 1916 (Illustrirte Zeitung)

History

German Empire
- Name: U-43
- Ordered: 10 July 1913
- Builder: Kaiserliche Werft Danzig
- Yard number: 21
- Launched: 26 September 1914
- Commissioned: 30 April 1915
- Fate: Surrendered 20 November 1918; scrapped 1919.

General characteristics
- Class & type: Type U-43 submarine
- Displacement: 725 t (714 long tons) surfaced; 940 t (930 long tons) submerged
- Length: 65 m (213 ft 3 in) (o/a)
- Beam: 6.20 m (20 ft 4 in) (oa); 4.18 m (13 ft 9 in) (pressure hull)
- Height: 8.70 m (28 ft 7 in)
- Draught: 3.74 m (12 ft 3 in)
- Installed power: 2 × 2,000 PS (1,471 kW; 1,973 shp) surfaced; 2 × 1,200 PS (883 kW; 1,184 shp) submerged
- Propulsion: 2 shafts
- Speed: 15.2 knots (28.2 km/h; 17.5 mph) surfaced; 9.7 knots (18.0 km/h; 11.2 mph) submerged
- Range: 11,400 nmi (21,100 km; 13,100 mi) at 8 knots (15 km/h; 9.2 mph) surfaced; 51 nmi (94 km; 59 mi) at 5 knots (9.3 km/h; 5.8 mph) submerged
- Test depth: 50 m (164 ft 1 in)
- Complement: 36
- Armament: 6 × torpedo tubes (four bow, two stern); 8 torpedoes; 1 × 8.8 cm (3.5 in) SK L/30 deck gun with 276 rounds

Service record
- Part of: III Flotilla; Unknown – 11 November 1918
- Commanders: K.Kapt. Hellmuth Jürst; 30 April 1915 – 16 May 1917; Kptlt. Waldemar Bender; 17 May 1917 – 17 April 1918; Kptlt. Johannes Kirchner; 18 April – 11 November 1918
- Operations: 11 patrols
- Victories: 44 merchant ships sunk (112,643 GRT); 1 auxiliary warship sunk (1,680 GRT); 2 merchant ships taken as prize (356 GRT)

SM U-43 (Note: "SM" stands for "Seiner Majestät" (English: His Majesty's) and combined with the U for Unterseeboot would be translated as His Majesty's Submarine.) was one of 329 submarines serving in the Imperial German Navy in World War I. She engaged in commerce warfare in the First Battle of the Atlantic, performing 11 patrols from 1915 to 1918.

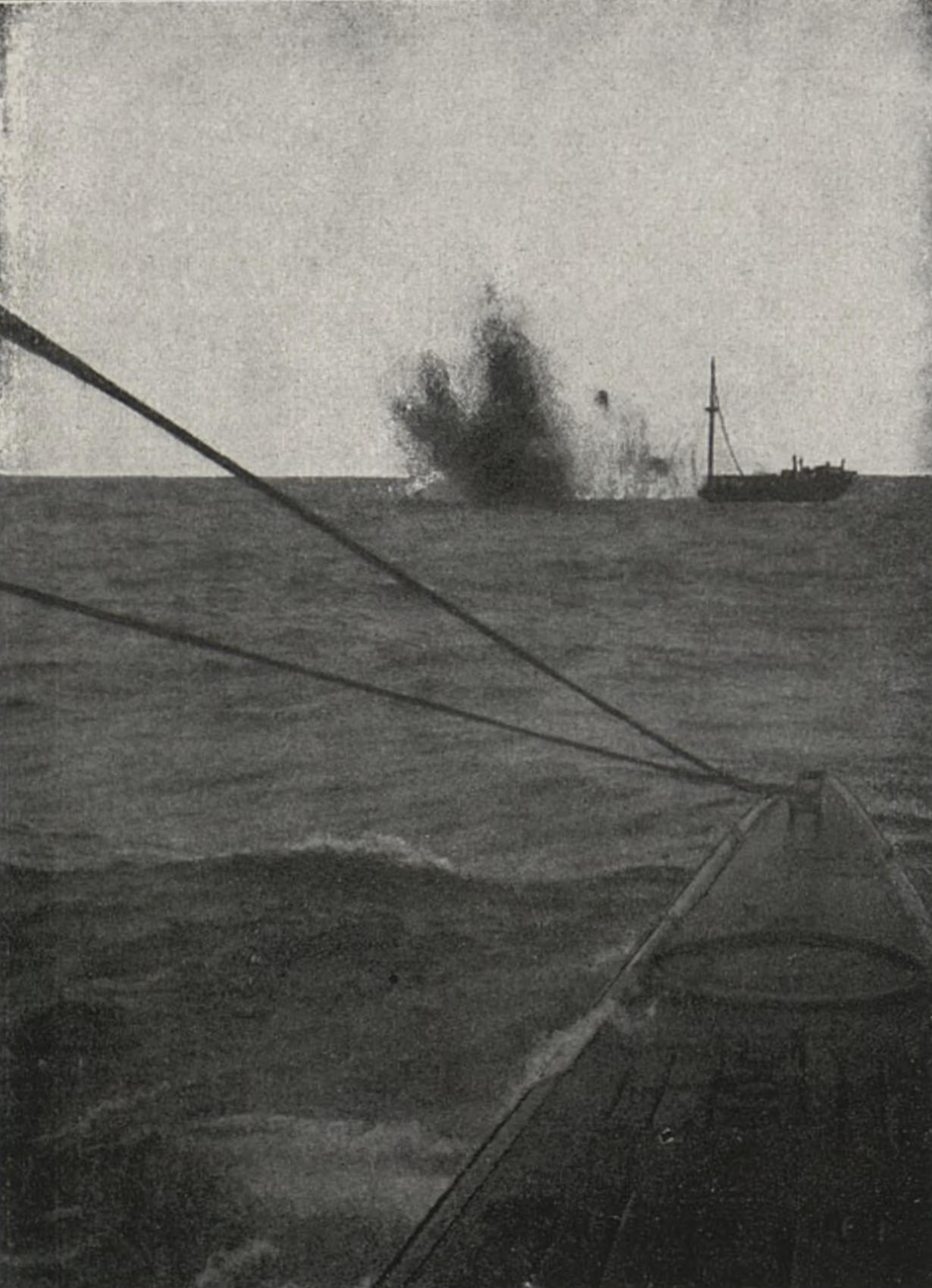
Sinking of the Russian steamer Tourgai on 3 October 1916

U-43 was surrendered to the Allies at Harwich on 20 November 1918 in accordance with the requirements of the Armistice with Germany. She was sold (without engines, removed at Chatham) by the British Admiralty to George Cohen on 3 March 1919 for £2,400, and was broken up at Swansea from May 1919 and 1922.

== Summary of raiding history ==
Date	Name	Nationality	Tonnage (Note: Tonnages are in gross register tons)	Fate
21 March 1916	Aranmore	United Kingdom	1,050	Sunk
24 March 1916	Englishman	United Kingdom	5,257	Sunk
26 September 1916	Dania	Norway	862	Sunk
26 September 1916	Knut Hilde	Norway	1,632	Sunk
28 September 1916	Rolf Jarl	Norway	1,265	Sunk
29 September 1916	Knut Jarl	Norway	1,070	Sunk
29 September 1916	Nesjar	Norway	1,609	Sunk
30 September 1916	Fancy	Norway	1,612	Sunk
3 October 1916	J. Y. Short	United Kingdom	2,193	Sunk
3 October 1916	Tourgai	Russian Empire	4,281	Sunk
10 October 1916	Gardepee	United Kingdom	1,633	Sunk
11 October 1916	Bistritza	Romania	3,688	Sunk
17 October 1916	Edam	Norway	2,381	Sunk
22 January 1917	Duc D’aumale	France	2,189	Sunk
23 January 1917	Jevington	United Kingdom	2,747	Sunk
23 January 1917	Donstad	Norway	699	Sunk
28 January 1917	Foz Do Douro	Portugal	1,677	Sunk
28 January 1917	Fulton	Norway	1,034	Sunk
31 January 1917	Rigel	Norway	2,671	Sunk
3 February 1917	Hollinside	United Kingdom	2,862	Sunk
3 February 1917	Songelv	Norway	2,064	Sunk
3 February 1917	Wasdale	Norway	1,856	Sunk
4 February 1917	Turino	United Kingdom	4,241	Sunk
9 February 1917	Famiglia	Kingdom of Italy	2,942	Sunk
16 April 1917	Anne	Denmark	240	Sunk
16 April 1917	Endymion	Russian Empire	1,345	Sunk
16 April 1917	Towergate	United Kingdom	3,697	Sunk
20 April 1917	August	Russian Empire	1,596	Sunk
20 April 1917	San Hilario	United Kingdom	10,157	Sunk
22 April 1917	Woodward Abrahams	United States	744	Sunk
24 April 1917	Cordelia	Sweden	613	Sunk
25 April 1917	Abosso	United Kingdom	7,782	Sunk
26 April 1917	Ehrglis	Russian Empire	238	Sunk
26 April 1917	Hektoria	Norway	5,002	Sunk
3 May 1917	Emma	Netherlands	183	Captured as prize
3 May 1917	Concordia	Netherlands	173	Captured as prize
4 June 1917	Juno	Norway	1,169	Sunk
10 June 1917	Haulwen	United Kingdom	4,032	Sunk
11 June 1917	Teviotdale	United Kingdom	3,847	Sunk
19 June 1917	Tunisie	France	3,246	Sunk
18 September 1917	HMS Glenfoyle	Royal Navy	1,680	Sunk
28 December 1917	Magellan	France	6,265	Sunk
27 July 1918	Subadar	United Kingdom	4,911	Sunk
3 August 1918	Maceio	Brazil	3,739	Sunk
3 August 1918	Vouga	Portugal	96	Sunk
15 October 1918	Bretagne	France	316	Sunk
19 October 1918	Aida	Portugal	93	Sunk

== Bibliography ==
- Gröner, Erich; Jung, Dieter; Maass, Martin (1991). German Warships 1815–1945, U-boats and Mine Warfare Vessels. Vol. 2. Translated by Thomas, Keith; Magowan, Rachel. London: Conway Maritime Press. ISBN 0-85177-593-4.
- Rössler, Eberhard (1981). The U-boat : the evolution and technical history of German submarines. London: Cassell. ISBN 0304361208.
