= SM UC-31 =

German Type UC II minelaying submarine

History

German Empire
- Name: UC-31
- Ordered: 29 August 1915
- Builder: AG Vulcan, Hamburg
- Yard number: 70
- Launched: 7 August 1916
- Commissioned: 2 September 1916
- Fate: Surrendered, 26 November 1918; broken up, 1922

General characteristics
- Class & type: Type UC II submarine
- Displacement: 400 t (390 long tons), surfaced; 480 t (470 long tons), submerged
- Length: 49.45 m (162 ft 3 in) o/a; 39.30 m (128 ft 11 in) pressure hull
- Beam: 5.22 m (17 ft 2 in) o/a; 3.65 m (12 ft) pressure hull
- Draught: 3.68 m (12 ft 1 in)
- Propulsion: 2 × propeller shafts; 2 × 6-cylinder, 4-stroke diesel engines, 500 PS (370 kW; 490 bhp); 2 × electric motors, 460 PS (340 kW; 450 shp)
- Speed: 11.6 knots (21.5 km/h; 13.3 mph), surfaced; 6.7 knots (12.4 km/h; 7.7 mph), submerged
- Range: 10,040 nmi (18,590 km; 11,550 mi) at 7 knots (13 km/h; 8.1 mph), surfaced; 53 nmi (98 km; 61 mi) at 4 knots (7.4 km/h; 4.6 mph), submerged
- Test depth: 50 m (160 ft)
- Complement: 26
- Armament: 6 × 100 cm (39.4 in) mine tubes; 18 × UC 200 mines; 3 × 50 cm (19.7 in) torpedo tubes (2 bow/external; one stern); 7 × torpedoes; 1 × 8.8 cm (3.5 in) Uk L/30 deck gun
- Notes: 48-second diving time

Service record
- Part of: I Flotilla; 10 December 1916 – 14 June 1918; Flandern II Flotilla; 14 June – 7 October 1918; I Flotilla; 7 October – 11 November 1918
- Commanders: Oblt.z.S. / Kptlt. Otto von Schrader; 2 September 1916 – 20 July 1917; Kptlt. Kurt Siewert; 21 July 1917 – 14 June 1918; Oblt.z.S. Willy Stüben; 15 June – 11 November 1918
- Operations: 13 patrols
- Victories: 35 merchant ships sunk (50,258 GRT); 3 auxiliary warships sunk (759 GRT); 3 merchant ships damaged (8,016 GRT); 1 warship damaged (1,025 tons)

SM UC-31 was a German Type UC II minelaying submarine or U-boat in the German Imperial Navy (German: Kaiserliche Marine) during World War I. The U-boat was ordered on 29 August 1915 and was launched on 7 August 1916. She was commissioned into the German Imperial Navy on 2 September 1916 as SM UC-31. (Note: "SM" stands for "Seiner Majestät" (English: His Majesty's) and combined with the U for Unterseeboot would be translated as His Majesty's Submarine.) In 13 patrols UC-31 was credited with sinking 38 ships, either by torpedo or by mines laid. UC-31 was surrendered on 26 November 1918 and broken up at Canning Town in 1922.

== Design ==
A Type UC II submarine, UC-31 had a displacement of 400 tonnes (390 long tons) when at the surface and 480 tonnes (470 long tons) while submerged. She had a length overall of 49.45 m (162 ft 3 in), a beam of 5.22 m (17 ft 2 in), and a draught of 3.68 m (12 ft 1 in). The submarine was powered by two six-cylinder four-stroke diesel engines each producing 250 metric horsepower (180 kW; 250 shp) (a total of 500 metric horsepower (370 kW; 490 shp)), two electric motors producing 460 metric horsepower (340 kW; 450 shp), and two propeller shafts. She had a dive time of 48 seconds and was capable of operating at a depth of 50 metres (160 ft).

The submarine had a maximum surface speed of 11.6 knots (21.5 km/h; 13.3 mph) and a submerged speed of 6.7 knots (12.4 km/h; 7.7 mph). When submerged, she could operate for 53 nautical miles (98 km; 61 mi) at 4 knots (7.4 km/h; 4.6 mph); when surfaced, she could travel 10,040 nautical miles (18,590 km; 11,550 mi) at 7 knots (13 km/h; 8.1 mph). UC-31 was fitted with six 100 centimetres (39 in) mine tubes, eighteen UC 200 mines, three 50 centimetres (20 in) torpedo tubes (one on the stern and two on the bow), seven torpedoes, and one 8.8 cm (3.5 in) Uk L/30 deck gun. Her complement was twenty-six crew members.

== Summary of raiding history ==
Date	Name	Nationality	Tonnage (Note: Merchant ship tonnages are in gross register tons. Military vessels are listed by tons displacement.)	Fate
31 December 1916	Protector	United Kingdom	200	Sunk
4 January 1917	Lonclara	United Kingdom	1,294	Sunk
25 January 1917	O. B. Suhr	Denmark	1,482	Sunk
28 January 1917	Alexandra	United Kingdom	179	Sunk
29 January 1917	Shamrock	United Kingdom	173	Sunk
29 January 1917	Thistle	United Kingdom	167	Sunk
31 January 1917	Ravensbourne	United Kingdom	1,226	Sunk
24 February 1917	Beneficent	United Kingdom	1,963	Sunk
29 March 1917	Kathleen Lily	United Kingdom	521	Sunk
30 March 1917	Harberton	United Kingdom	1,443	Sunk
4 April 1917	Helga	Denmark	839	Sunk
5 April 1917	N. J. Fjord	Denmark	1,425	Sunk
6 April 1917	HMT Strathrannoch	Royal Navy	215	Sunk
11 April 1917	Quaggy	United Kingdom	993	Sunk
12 April 1917	Dina Hinderika	Netherlands	200	Sunk
12 April 1917	Neptunus	Netherlands	209	Sunk
12 April 1917	Union	Denmark	152	Sunk
12 April 1917	Voorwaarts	Netherlands	147	Sunk
14 April 1917	Spray	United Kingdom	1,072	Sunk
15 April 1917	Brothertoft	United Kingdom	155	Sunk
6 May 1917	Poseidon I	Netherlands	98	Sunk
8 May 1917	HMY Zarefah	Royal Navy	279	Sunk
17 May 1917	Aspen	Sweden	3,103	Damaged
17 May 1917	Viken	Sweden	1,825	Sunk
30 June 1917	Lady of the Lake	United Kingdom	51	Sunk
1 July 1917	Amstelland	Netherlands	5,404	Sunk
2 July 1917	Thirlby	United Kingdom	2,009	Sunk
3 July 1917	Matador	United Kingdom	3,642	Sunk
7 August 1917	Othalia	Sweden	1,205	Damaged
11 August 1917	Holar	Denmark	548	Sunk
12 August 1917	Bogatyr	Denmark	1,360	Sunk
8 September 1917	Newholm	United Kingdom	3,399	Sunk
11 September 1917	Cento	United Kingdom	3,708	Damaged
16 September 1917	Quatre Freres	France	53	Sunk
13 November 1917	Amelie	Belgium	1,135	Sunk
13 November 1917	Australbush	Australia	4,398	Sunk
19 November 1917	HMT Morococala	Royal Navy	265	Sunk
21 January 1918	Teelin Head	United Kingdom	1,718	Sunk
29 January 1918	Ethelinda	United Kingdom	3,257	Sunk
1 April 1918	Ardglass	United Kingdom	4,617	Sunk
5 April 1918	Cyrene	United Kingdom	2,904	Sunk
10 April 1918	HMS Magic	Royal Navy	1,025	Damaged
