= SM UC-21 =

German Type UC II minelaying submarine

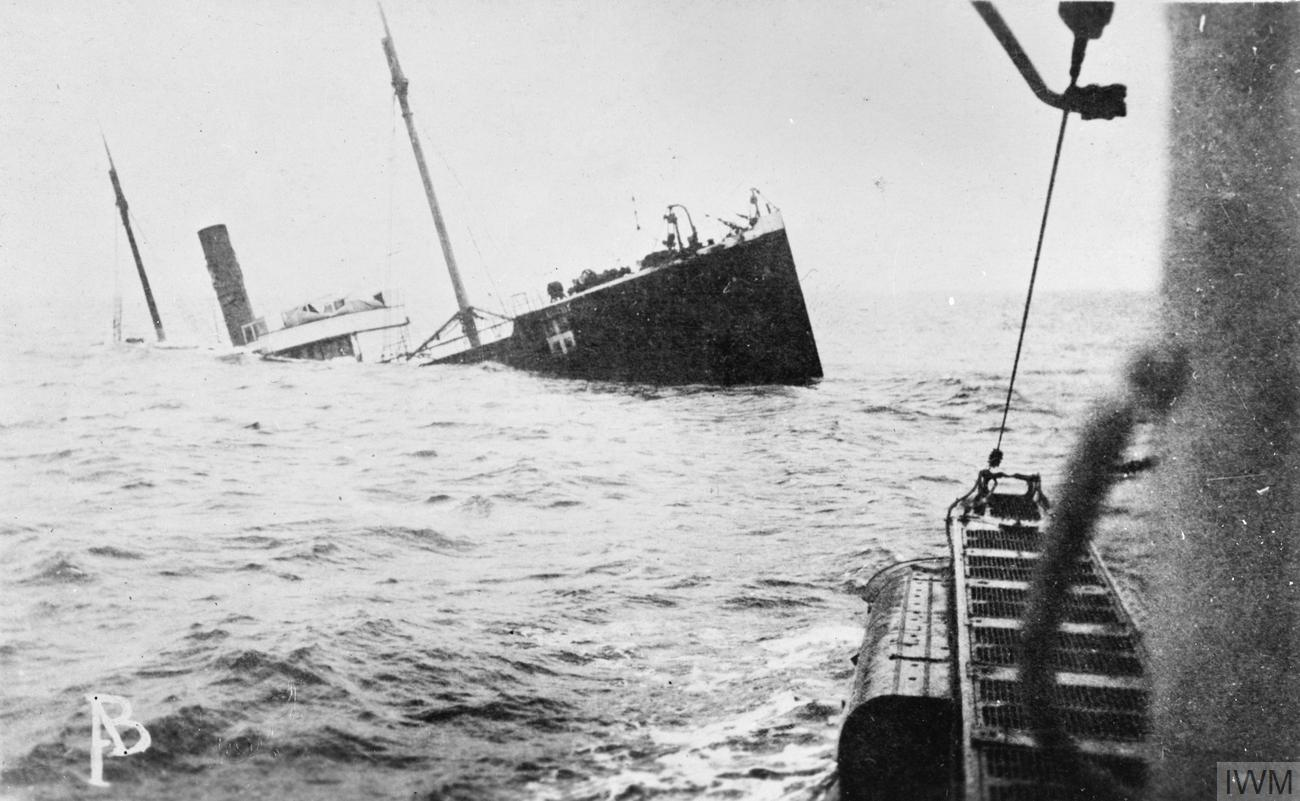
- Imperial German Navy U-boat SM UC-21 sinking steamship

History

German Empire
- Name: UC-21
- Ordered: 29 August 1915
- Builder: Blohm & Voss, Hamburg
- Yard number: 271
- Launched: 1 April 1916
- Commissioned: 12 September 1916
- Fate: Missing since September 1917

General characteristics
- Class & type: Type UC II submarine
- Displacement: 417 t (410 long tons), surfaced; 493 t (485 long tons), submerged
- Length: 49.35 m (161 ft 11 in) o/a; 39.30 m (128 ft 11 in) pressure hull
- Beam: 5.22 m (17 ft 2 in) o/a; 3.65 m (12 ft) pressure hull
- Draught: 3.68 m (12 ft 1 in)
- Propulsion: 2 × propeller shafts; 2 × 6-cylinder, 4-stroke diesel engines, 500 bhp (370 kW); 2 × electric motors, 460 shp (340 kW)
- Speed: 11.6 knots (21.5 km/h; 13.3 mph), surfaced; 7.0 knots (13.0 km/h; 8.1 mph), submerged
- Range: 9,430 nmi (17,460 km; 10,850 mi) at 7 knots (13 km/h; 8.1 mph), surfaced; 55 nmi (102 km; 63 mi) at 4 knots (7.4 km/h; 4.6 mph), submerged
- Test depth: 50 m (160 ft)
- Complement: 26
- Armament: 6 × 100 cm (39.4 in) mine tubes; 18 × UC 200 mines; 3 × 50 cm (19.7 in) torpedo tubes (2 bow/external; one stern); 7 × torpedoes; 1 × 8.8 cm (3.5 in) Uk L/30 deck gun
- Notes: 35-second diving time

Service record
- Part of: Flandern Flotilla; 14 November 1916 – 30 September 1917
- Commanders: Oblt.z.S. Reinhold Saltzwedel; 15 September 1916 – 9 June 1917; Oblt.z.S. Werner von Zerboni di Sposetti; 10 June – 30 September 1917
- Operations: 11 patrols
- Victories: 95 merchant ships sunk (131,844 GRT); 3 auxiliary warships sunk (2,219 GRT); 5 merchant ships damaged (11,826 GRT); 1 warship damaged (778 tons); 1 merchant ship taken as prize (148 GRT)

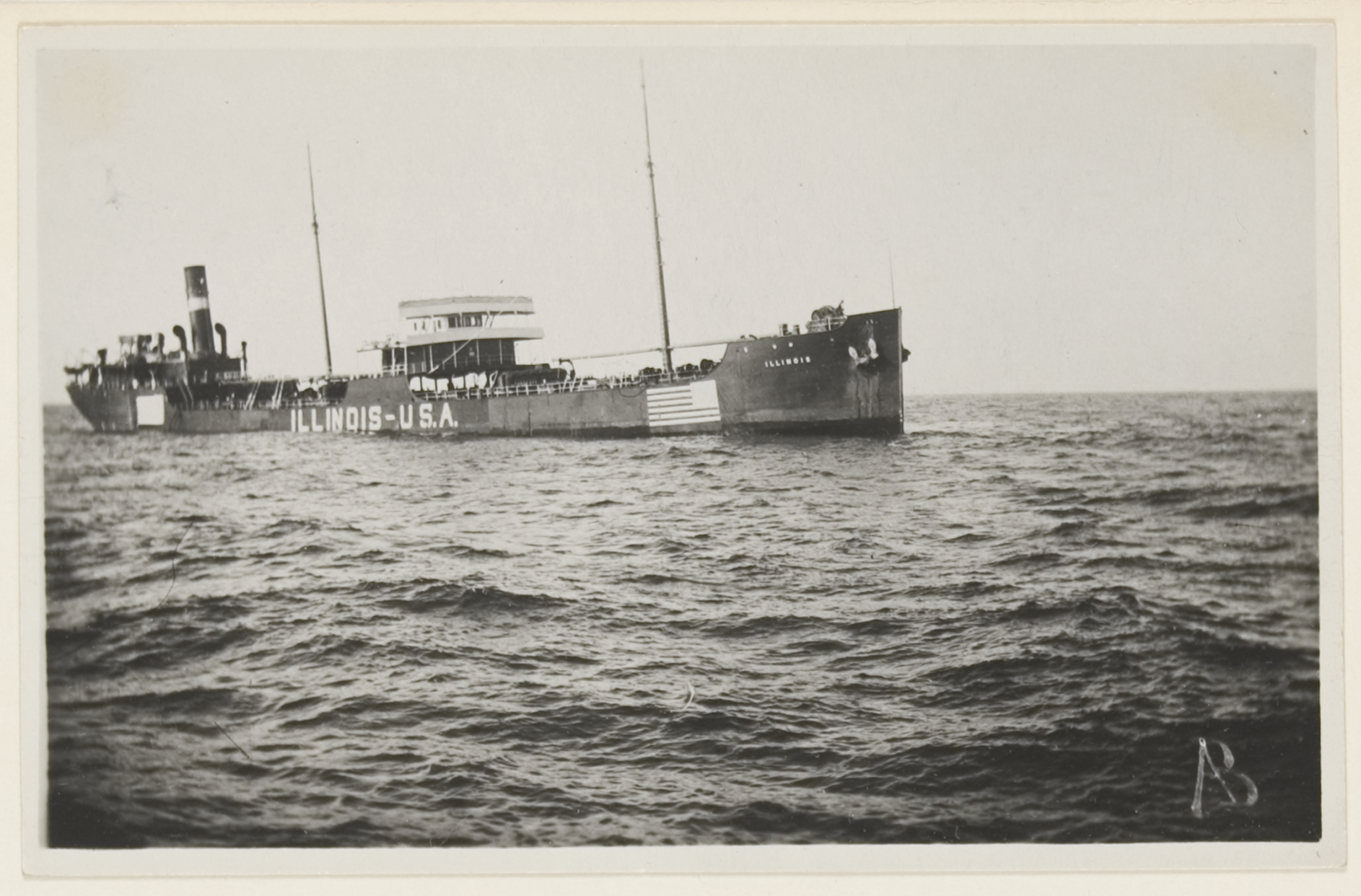

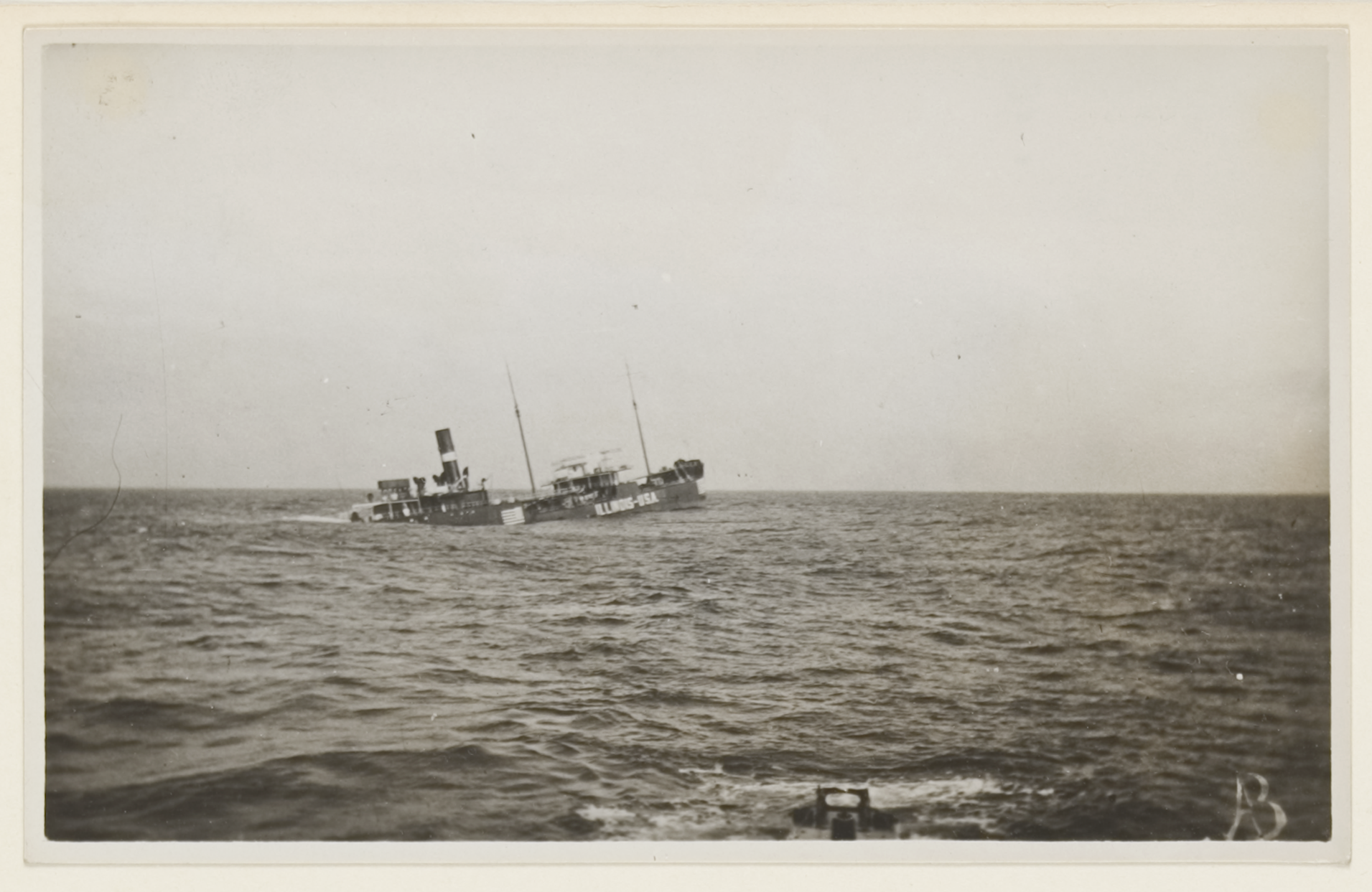
March 18, 1917, Imperial German Navy U-boat SM UC-21 sinking American tanker steamer Illinois

SM UC-21 was a German Type UC II minelaying submarine or U-boat in the German Imperial Navy (German: Kaiserliche Marine) during World War I. The U-boat was ordered on 29 August 1915 and was launched on 1 April 1916. She was commissioned into the German Imperial Navy on 12 September 1916 as SM UC-21. (Note: "SM" stands for "Seiner Majestät" (English: His Majesty's) and combined with the U for Unterseeboot translates as His Majesty's Submarine.)

In eleven patrols UC-21 was credited with sinking 98 ships, either by torpedo or by mines laid. They included the British hospital ship Donegal, which UC-21 torpedoed in the English Channel on 17 April 1917, killing 29 already wounded soldiers and 12 crew.

UC-21 disappeared after departing Zeebrugge for the Bay of Biscay on 13 September 1917.

== Design ==
Like all pre-UC-25 Type UC II submarines, UC-21 had a displacement of 417 tonnes (410 long tons) when at the surface and 493 tonnes (485 long tons) while submerged. She had a total length of 49.35 m (161 ft 11 in), a beam of 5.22 m (17 ft 2 in), and a draught of 3.65 m (12 ft). The submarine was powered by two six-cylinder four-stroke diesel engines each producing 250 metric horsepower (180 kW; 250 shp) (a total of 500 metric horsepower (370 kW; 490 shp)), two electric motors producing 460 metric horsepower (340 kW; 450 shp), and two propeller shafts. She had a dive time of 35 seconds and was capable of operating at a depth of 50 metres (160 ft).

The submarine had a maximum surface speed of 11.6 knots (21.5 km/h; 13.3 mph) and a submerged speed of 7 knots (13 km/h; 8.1 mph). When submerged, she could operate for 55 nautical miles (102 km; 63 mi) at 4 knots (7.4 km/h; 4.6 mph); when surfaced, she could travel 9,430 nautical miles (17,460 km; 10,850 mi) at 7 knots (13 km/h; 8.1 mph). UC-21 was fitted with six 100 centimetres (39 in) mine tubes, eighteen UC 200 mines, three 50 centimetres (20 in) torpedo tubes (one on the stern and two on the bow), seven torpedoes, and one 8.8 cm (3.5 in) Uk L/30 deck gun. Her complement was twenty-six crew members.

== Summary of raiding history ==
Date	Name	Nationality	Tonnage (Note: Merchant ship tonnages are in gross register tons. Military vessels are listed by tons displacement.)	Fate
28 November 1916	Clematis	United Kingdom	22	Sunk
28 November 1916	Lady of the Lake	United Kingdom	91	Sunk
28 November 1916	Vulcan	United Kingdom	27	Sunk
28 November 1916	HMD Pelagia	Royal Navy	84	Sunk
30 November 1916	Draupner	Norway	1,126	Sunk
30 November 1916	Eggesford	United Kingdom	4,414	Damaged
30 November 1916	Therese	France	165	Sunk
1 December 1916	King Bleddyn	United Kingdom	4,387	Sunk
2 December 1916	Demetrios Inglesis	Greece	2,088	Sunk
2 December 1916	Robinson	France	186	Sunk
2 December 1916	Uribitarte	Spain	1,756	Sunk
3 December 1916	Aiglon	France	280	Sunk
3 December 1916	Louise	France	155	Sunk
3 December 1916	Verdun	France	184	Sunk
4 December 1916	Pallas	Russian Empire	1,202	Sunk
5 December 1916	Nexos	Denmark	1,013	Sunk
6 December 1916	Gerona	Spain	1,328	Sunk
7 December 1916	Avristan	United Kingdom	3,818	Sunk
8 December 1916	HMT Dagon	Royal Navy	250	Sunk
8 December 1916	Falk	Norway	1,379	Sunk
8 December 1916	Marjolaine	France	163	Sunk
8 December 1916	Modum	Norway	2,937	Sunk
17 December 1916	Margaret	United Kingdom	54	Sunk
18 January 1917	HMS Ferret	Royal Navy	778	Damaged
19 January 1917	Joseph Rosalie	France	138	Sunk
19 January 1917	Marietta Di Giorgio	Norway	988	Sunk
19 January 1917	Tremeadow	United Kingdom	3,653	Sunk
20 January 1917	Kisagata Maru No. 3	Japan	2,588	Sunk
20 January 1917	Jotunfjell	Norway	2,492	Damaged
21 January 1917	Victoire	France	290	Damaged
21 January 1917	Leontine	France	124	Sunk
21 January 1917	Saint Pierre	France	127	Sunk
22 January 1917	Bearnais	France	301	Sunk
22 January 1917	Precurseur	France	364	Sunk
22 January 1917	Steinmachos	Greece	1,175	Sunk
24 January 1917	Dan	Denmark	1,869	Sunk
24 January 1917	Gladiateur	France	23	Sunk
24 January 1917	Loire III	France	27	Sunk
24 January 1917	Marie 3	France	25	Sunk
24 January 1917	Quebec	France	3,346	Sunk
24 January 1917	Vega	Denmark	195	Sunk
25 January 1917	Myrdal	Norway	2,631	Sunk
1 February 1917	Sainte Helene	France	2,128	Sunk
10 February 1917	Beechtree	United Kingdom	1,277	Sunk
11 February 1917	Dernes	Norway	738	Sunk
12 February 1917	Nordcap	Norway	332	Sunk
13 February 1917	Progreso	Norway	1,620	Sunk
14 February 1917	Longscar	United Kingdom	2,777	Sunk
14 February 1917	Mar Adriatico	Spain	2,410	Sunk
15 February 1917	Aline	France	30	Sunk
15 February 1917	Marion Dawson	United Kingdom	2,300	Sunk
16 February 1917	Niobe	France	1,319	Sunk
16 February 1917	Pollcrea	United Kingdom	1,209	Damaged
17 February 1917	Cabo	Norway	1,254	Sunk
17 February 1917	Silene	France	171	Sunk
18 February 1917	Triumph	United Kingdom	52	Sunk
19 February 1917	Rutenfjell	Norway	1,844	Sunk
10 March 1917	Asbjørn	Norway	3,459	Sunk
12 March 1917	Alice Charles	France	41	Sunk
12 March 1917	Arethuse	France	40	Sunk
13 March 1917	Girda	Norway	1,824	Sunk
13 March 1917	Vivina	Spain	3,034	Sunk
14 March 1917	Blaamanden	Norway	954	Sunk
14 March 1917	La Marne	France	133	Sunk
15 March 1917	Eugene Robert	France	98	Sunk
15 March 1917	Fleur D’Esperance	France	24	Sunk
15 March 1917	Frimaire	United Kingdom	1,778	Sunk
15 March 1917	Petit Jean	France	21	Sunk
16 March 1917	Anais	France	130	Sunk
16 March 1917	Madeleine Davoust	France	148	Sunk
16 March 1917	Ronald	Norway	3,021	Sunk
18 March 1917	Illinois	United States	5,225	Sunk
17 April 1917	HMHS Donegal	Royal Navy	1,885	Sunk
19 April 1917	Cilurnum	United Kingdom	3,126	Sunk
20 April 1917	Georgios	Greece	3,124	Sunk
21 April 1917	Emile Et Charlotte	France	41	Sunk
21 April 1917	Ville De Dieppe	Norway	1,254	Sunk
22 April 1917	Capenor	United Kingdom	2,536	Sunk
22 April 1917	Percy Birdsall	United States	1,127	Sunk
22 April 1917	Valerie	Norway	2,140	Sunk
24 April 1917	Barnton	United Kingdom	1,858	Sunk
25 April 1917	Baigorry	France	2,161	Sunk
26 April 1917	Boy Denis	United Kingdom	41	Sunk
22 May 1917	Jeune Albert	France	25	Sunk
23 May 1917	Harwood Palmer	United States	2,885	Sunk
23 May 1917	Lesto	United Kingdom	1,940	Sunk
26 May 1917	Aristides	Greece	2,179	Sunk
26 May 1917	Norhaug	Norway	1,245	Sunk
27 May 1917	Efstathios	Greece	3,847	Sunk
28 May 1917	Hiram	Norway	598	Sunk
28 May 1917	Urna	Norway	2,686	Sunk
28 May 1917	Waldemar	Norway	1,267	Sunk
30 May 1917	Sørland	Norway	2,472	Sunk
2 June 1917	Tonawanda	United Kingdom	3,421	Damaged
7 June 1917	Hafnia	Denmark	1,619	Sunk
29 June 1917	Lauwerzee	Netherlands	47	Sunk
4 July 1917	Bestevaer	Netherlands	1,044	Sunk
4 July 1917	Roelfina	Netherlands	148	Captured as prize
11 July 1917	Coquimbo	France	1,759	Sunk
15 August 1917	Phoebe	France	3,956	Sunk
17 August 1917	Pontoporos	Greece	4,049	Sunk
19 August 1917	Therese & Marie	France	1,615	Sunk
31 August 1917	Marques De Mudela	Spain	1,930	Sunk
16 September 1917	Ann J. Trainer	United States	426	Sunk
23 September 1917	St. Dunstan	United Kingdom	730	Sunk

== Bibliography ==
- Bendert, Harald (2001). Die UC-Boote der Kaiserlichen Marine 1914-1918. Minenkrieg mit U-Booten (in German). Hamburg, Berlin, Bonn: Mittler. ISBN 3-8132-0758-7.
- Gröner, Erich; Jung, Dieter; Maass, Martin (1991). U-boats and Mine Warfare Vessels. German Warships 1815–1945. Vol. 2. Translated by Thomas, Keith; Magowan, Rachel. London: Conway Maritime Press. ISBN 0-85177-593-4.
- Gardiner, Robert, ed. (1985). Conway's All the World's Fighting Ships 1906–1921. Annapolis, MD: Naval Institute Press. ISBN 978-0-87021-907-8. OCLC 12119866.
- Tarrant, V. E. (1989). The U-Boat Offensive: 1914–1945. Annapolis, MD: Naval Institute Press. ISBN 978-0-87021-764-7. OCLC 20338385.
