= SM U-84 =

History

German Empire
- Name: U-84
- Ordered: 23 June 1915
- Builder: Germaniawerft, Kiel
- Yard number: 254
- Laid down: 25 October 1915
- Launched: 22 July 1916
- Commissioned: 7 October 1916
- Fate: Sunk by unknown cause off Penmarch, France on 15 June 1918

General characteristics
- Displacement: 808 t (795 long tons) surfaced; 946 t (931 long tons) submerged
- Length: 70.06 m (229 ft 10 in) (o/a); 55.55 m (182 ft 3 in) (pressure hull)
- Beam: 6.30 m (20 ft 8 in) (oa); 4.15 m (13 ft 7 in) (pressure hull)
- Height: 8.00 m (26 ft 3 in)
- Draught: 4.02 m (13 ft 2 in)
- Installed power: 2 × 2,400 PS (1,765 kW; 2,367 shp) surfaced; 2 × 1,200 PS (883 kW; 1,184 shp) submerged
- Propulsion: 2 shafts, 2 × 1.70 m (5 ft 7 in) propellers
- Speed: 16.8 knots (31.1 km/h; 19.3 mph) surfaced; 9.1 knots (16.9 km/h; 10.5 mph) submerged
- Range: 11,220 nmi (20,780 km; 12,910 mi) at 8 knots (15 km/h; 9.2 mph) surfaced; 56 nmi (104 km; 64 mi) at 5 knots (9.3 km/h; 5.8 mph) submerged
- Test depth: 50 m (160 ft)
- Complement: 4 officers, 31 enlisted
- Armament: 4 × 50 cm (19.7 in) torpedo tubes (two bow, two stern); 12-16 torpedoes; 1 × 10.5 cm (4.1 in) SK L/45 deck gun (from 1917)

Service record
- Part of: IV Flotilla; 3 December 1916 – 26 January 1918
- Commanders: Kptlt. Walter Roehr; 17 October 1916 – 26 January 1918
- Operations: 8 patrols
- Victories: 28 merchant ships sunk (84,906 GRT); 1 warship sunk (1,290 tons); 7 merchant ships damaged (42,149 GRT); 2 merchant ships taken as prize (3,462 GRT)

SM U-84 was one of the 329 submarines serving in the Imperial German Navy (Kaiserliche Marine) in World War I. U-84 was engaged in the naval warfare and took part in the First Battle of the Atlantic.

Initially U-81 to U-83 had one 10.5 cm gun with 140-240 rounds. U-84 - U-86 on the other hand had two 8.8 cm guns. In 1917 U-84 - U-86 were refitted with a single 10.5 cm gun (240 rounds)

== Design ==
Type U 81 submarines were preceded by the shorter Type UE I submarines. U-84 had a displacement of 808 tonnes (795 long tons) when at the surface and 946 tonnes (931 long tons) while submerged. She had a total length of 70.06 m (229 ft 10 in), a pressure hull length of 55.55 m (182 ft 3 in), a beam of 6.30 m (20 ft 8 in), a height of 8 m (26 ft 3 in), and a draught of 4.02 m (13 ft 2 in). The submarine was powered by two 2,400 metric horsepower (1,800 kW; 2,400 shp) engines for use while surfaced, and two 1,200 metric horsepower (880 kW; 1,200 shp) engines for use while submerged. She had two propeller shafts. She was capable of operating at depths of up to 50 metres (160 ft).

The submarine had a maximum surface speed of 16.8 knots (31.1 km/h; 19.3 mph) and a maximum submerged speed of 9.1 knots (16.9 km/h; 10.5 mph). When submerged, she could operate for 56 nautical miles (104 km; 64 mi) at 5 knots (9.3 km/h; 5.8 mph); when surfaced, she could travel 11,220 nautical miles (20,780 km; 12,910 mi) at 8 knots (15 km/h; 9.2 mph). U-84 was fitted with four 50 centimetres (20 in) torpedo tubes (two at the bow and two at the stern), twelve to sixteen torpedoes, and one 10.5 cm (4.1 in) SK L/45 deck gun. She had a complement of thirty-five (thirty-one crew members and four officers).

=== Previously recorded fate ===
U-84 was originally though to have been rammed, depth charged and sunk by PC62 in St George's Channel and sunk at 51°53′N 5°44′W.

== Summary of raiding history ==
Date	Name	Nationality	Tonnage (Note: Merchant ship tonnages are in gross register tons. Military vessels are listed by tons displacement.)	Fate
14 December 1916	Aamot	Norway	1,362	Captured as prize
18 December 1916	Malcolm	Sweden	2,100	Captured as prize
9 January 1917	Alexandrian	United Kingdom	4,467	Damaged
10 January 1917	Bergenhus	Norway	3,606	Sunk
12 January 1917	Auchencrag	United Kingdom	3,916	Sunk
15 January 1917	Kinpurney	United Kingdom	1,944	Sunk
15 January 1917	Omsk	Denmark	1,574	Sunk
20 January 1917	Bulgarian	United Kingdom	2,515	Sunk
20 January 1917	Neuquen	United Kingdom	3,583	Sunk
17 February 1917	Bayonne	France	2,589	Sunk
17 February 1917	Romsdalen	United Kingdom	2,548	Sunk
18 February 1917	Berrima	United Kingdom	11,137	Damaged
18 February 1917	Hunsworth	United Kingdom	2,991	Damaged
18 February 1917	Juno	Norway	2,416	Sunk
18 February 1917	Valdes	United Kingdom	2,233	Sunk
21 February 1917	Dukat	Norway	1,408	Sunk
22 February 1917	Invercauld	United Kingdom	1,416	Sunk
13 April 1917	Argyll	United Kingdom	3,547	Sunk
13 April 1917	Lime Branch	United Kingdom	5,379	Damaged
18 April 1917	Cragoswald	United Kingdom	3,235	Sunk
18 April 1917	Rowena	United Kingdom	3,017	Sunk
19 April 1917	Elswick Manor	United Kingdom	3,943	Sunk
20 April 1917	Malakand	United Kingdom	7,653	Sunk
1 July 1917	Bachi	Spain	2,184	Sunk
1 July 1917	Demerara	United Kingdom	11,484	Damaged
4 July 1917	Goathland	United Kingdom	3,044	Sunk
7 July 1917	Condesa	United Kingdom	8,557	Sunk
7 July 1917	Oxø	Norway	831	Sunk
12 August 1917	Ursus Minor	Norway	623	Sunk
13 August 1917	HMS Bergamot	Royal Navy	1,290	Sunk
24 November 1917	Actaeon	United States	4,999	Sunk
1 December 1917	Antonios Stathatos	Greece	2,743	Sunk
2 December 1917	Birchgrove	United Kingdom	2,821	Sunk
9 January 1918	Bayvoe	United Kingdom	2,979	Sunk
10 January 1918	Cardiff	United Kingdom	2,808	Damaged
11 January 1918	Mereddio	United Kingdom	3,069	Sunk
12 January 1918	Chateau Laffite	France	1,913	Sunk
17 January 1918	Messidor	United Kingdom	3,883	Damaged

== Bibliography ==
- Gröner, Erich; Jung, Dieter; Maass, Martin (1991). U-boats and Mine Warfare Vessels. German Warships 1815–1945. Vol. 2. Translated by Thomas, Keith; Magowan, Rachel. London: Conway Maritime Press. ISBN 0-85177-593-4.
