= SM UC-37 =

German Type UC II minelaying U-boat

History

German Empire
- Name: UC-37
- Ordered: 20 November 1915
- Builder: Blohm & Voss, Hamburg
- Yard number: 278
- Launched: 5 June 1916
- Commissioned: 17 October 1916
- Fate: Surrendered, 25 November 1918; broken up, 1920

General characteristics
- Class & type: Type UC II submarine
- Displacement: 427 t (420 long tons), surfaced; 509 t (501 long tons), submerged
- Length: 50.35 m (165 ft 2 in) o/a; 40.30 m (132 ft 3 in) pressure hull
- Beam: 5.22 m (17 ft 2 in) o/a; 3.65 m (12 ft) pressure hull
- Draught: 3.65 m (12 ft)
- Propulsion: 2 × propeller shafts; 2 × 6-cylinder, 4-stroke diesel engines, 600 PS (440 kW; 590 shp); 2 × electric motors, 460 PS (340 kW; 450 shp)
- Speed: 11.6 knots (21.5 km/h; 13.3 mph), surfaced; 6.8 knots (12.6 km/h; 7.8 mph), submerged
- Range: 10,180 nmi (18,850 km; 11,710 mi) at 7 knots (13 km/h; 8.1 mph) surfaced; 54 nmi (100 km; 62 mi) at 4 knots (7.4 km/h; 4.6 mph) submerged
- Test depth: 50 m (160 ft)
- Complement: 26
- Armament: 6 × 100 cm (39.4 in) mine tubes; 18 × UC 200 mines; 3 × 50 cm (19.7 in) torpedo tubes (2 bow/external; one stern); 7 × torpedoes; 1 × 8.8 cm (3.5 in) Uk L/30 deck gun
- Notes: 35-second diving time

Service record
- Part of: Pola / Mittelmeer / Mittelmeer II Flotilla; 12 January 1917 – 18 July 1918; Constantinople Flotilla; 18 July – 11 November 1918
- Commanders: Oblt.z.S. Otto Launburg; 13 October 1916 – 1 July 1917; Oblt.z.S. Willy List; 2 July 1917 – 9 January 1918; Oblt.z.S. Otto Kümpel; 10 January – 14 November 1918
- Operations: 13 patrols
- Victories: 65 merchant ships sunk (85,805 GRT); 1 warship sunk (200 tons); 5 merchant ships damaged (20,829 GRT); 1 warship damaged (7,350 tons)

SM UC-37 was a German Type UC II minelaying submarine or U-boat in the German Imperial Navy (German: Kaiserliche Marine) during World War I. The U-boat was ordered on 20 November 1915 and was launched on 5 June 1916. She was commissioned into the German Imperial Navy on 17 October 1916 as SM UC-37. (Note: "SM" stands for "Seiner Majestät" (English: His Majesty's) and combined with the U for Unterseeboot would be translated as His Majesty's Submarine.) In 13 patrols UC-37 was credited with sinking 66 ships, either by torpedo or by mines laid. UC-37 was surrendered at Sevastopol on 25 November 1918 and broken up at Bizerta in August 1921.

== Design ==
A Type UC II submarine, UC-37 had a displacement of 427 tonnes (420 long tons) when at the surface and 509 tonnes (501 long tons) while submerged. She had a length overall of 50.35 m (165 ft 2 in), a beam of 5.22 m (17 ft 2 in), and a draught of 3.65 m (12 ft). The submarine was powered by two six-cylinder four-stroke diesel engines each producing 300 metric horsepower (220 kW; 300 shp) (a total of 600 metric horsepower (440 kW; 590 shp)), two electric motors producing 460 metric horsepower (340 kW; 450 shp), and two propeller shafts. She had a dive time of 35 seconds and was capable of operating at a depth of 50 metres (160 ft).

The submarine had a maximum surface speed of 11.6 knots (21.5 km/h; 13.3 mph) and a submerged speed of 6.6 knots (12.2 km/h; 7.6 mph). When submerged, she could operate for 54 nautical miles (100 km; 62 mi) at 4 knots (7.4 km/h; 4.6 mph); when surfaced, she could travel 10,180 nautical miles (18,850 km; 11,710 mi) at 7 knots (13 km/h; 8.1 mph). UC-37 was fitted with six 100 centimetres (39 in) mine tubes, eighteen UC 200 mines, three 50 centimetres (20 in) torpedo tubes (one on the stern and two on the bow), seven torpedoes, and one 8.8 cm (3.5 in) Uk L/30 deck gun. Her complement was twenty-six crew members.

== Summary of raiding history ==
| Date | Name | Nationality | Tonnage (Note: Merchant ship tonnages are in gross register tons. Military vessels are listed by tons displacement.) | Fate |
|---|---|---|---|---|
| 1 January 1917 | Britannic | Norway | 2,289 | Sunk |
| 2 January 1917 | Aristotelis C. Ioannou | Greece | 2,868 | Sunk |
| 2 January 1917 | Dimitrios Goulandris | Greece | 3,744 | Sunk |
| 2 January 1917 | Notre Dame Du Verger | France | 227 | Sunk |
| 3 January 1917 | Capricieuse | France | 156 | Sunk |
| 3 January 1917 | Fama | Norway | 2,417 | Sunk |
| 4 January 1917 | Liberte | France | 166 | Sunk |
| 4 January 1917 | Luigi Ciampa | Kingdom of Italy | 3,988 | Sunk |
| 4 January 1917 | Seemel | Russian Empire | 209 | Sunk |
| 4 January 1917 | Wragby | United Kingdom | 3,641 | Sunk |
| 5 January 1917 | Combermere | Kingdom of Italy | 1,718 | Sunk |
| 26 February 1917 | Gerolamo Ulloa | Kingdom of Italy | 4,283 | Damaged |
| 26 February 1917 | Victoria | Greece | 1,388 | Sunk |
| 3 March 1917 | Craigendoran | United Kingdom | 2,789 | Sunk |
| 5 March 1917 | Salvatore | Kingdom of Italy | 119 | Sunk |
| 27 March 1917 | Nr. 62 | French Navy | 200 | Sunk |
| 31 March 1917 | Galatee | France | 3,062 | Damaged |
| 3 April 1917 | Ernest Simons | France | 5,555 | Sunk |
| 3 April 1917 | Saint Simon | France | 3,419 | Sunk |
| 4 April 1917 | San Giovanni Battiste | Kingdom of Italy | 46 | Sunk |
| 14 April 1917 | Gange | French Navy | 6,886 | Sunk |
| 16 April 1917 | Sagres | Portugal | 2,986 | Sunk |
| 21 April 1917 | Warrior | United Kingdom | 3,674 | Sunk |
| 28 April 1917 | Niobe | Kingdom of Italy | 66 | Sunk |
| 29 April 1917 | Giuseppe Maria | Kingdom of Italy | 99 | Sunk |
| 30 April 1917 | Colbert | French Navy | 5,394 | Sunk |
| 2 May 1917 | Camerata | United Kingdom | 3,723 | Damaged |
| 5 May 1917 | Dina Di Lozenzo | Kingdom of Italy | 127 | Sunk |
| 5 May 1917 | Harmattan | United Kingdom | 4,792 | Sunk |
| 15 June 1917 | Assunzione | Kingdom of Italy | 3,770 | Sunk |
| 8 August 1917 | Breton | France | 3,739 | Sunk |
| 11 October 1917 | Unidentified Sailing Vessel | | 14 | Sunk |
| 31 October 1917 | Evangelistria | Greece | 17 | Sunk |
| 1 November 1917 | Marigo | Kingdom of Italy | 24 | Sunk |
| 3 November 1917 | A.S. 160 | Greece | 20 | Sunk |
| 3 November 1917 | Essichia | Greece | 30 | Sunk |
| 5 November 1917 | Caterina | Kingdom of Italy | 30 | Sunk |
| 23 December 1917 | Dunedin | United Kingdom | 4,796 | Damaged |
| 12 February 1918 | Aghios Nicolaos | Greece | 20 | Sunk |
| 14 February 1918 | Ventmoor | United Kingdom | 3,456 | Sunk |
| 15 February 1918 | San Rito | United Kingdom | 3,310 | Sunk |
| 17 March 1918 | Waihemo | United Kingdom | 4,283 | Sunk |
| 21 March 1918 | Termini | Kingdom of Italy | 1,523 | Sunk |
| 25 March 1918 | Warturm | United Kingdom | 4,965 | Damaged |
| 26 March 1918 | Unidentified Sailing Vessel | Greece | 31 | Sunk |
| 26 March 1918 | Unidentified sailing vessel | Greece | 15 | Sunk |
| 26 March 1918 | Unidentified Sailing Vessel | Greece | 15 | Sunk |
| 29 March 1918 | Porto Santo | Portugal | 2,801 | Sunk |
| 8 July 1918 | San Nicola | Greece | 50 | Sunk |
| 14 July 1918 | Hagios Zion | Greece | 4 | Sunk |
| 15 July 1918 | Unidentified Sailing Vessel | Greece | 2 | Sunk |
| 15 July 1918 | Unidentified Sailing Vessel | Greece | 14 | Sunk |
| 17 July 1918 | Unidentified Sailing vessel | Greece | 35 | Sunk |
| 19 August 1918 | Marie Suzanne | United Kingdom | 3,106 | Sunk |
| 19 August 1918 | Unidentified Sailing Vessel | Greece | 58 | Sunk |
| 19 August 1918 | NN155a | Greece | 30 | Sunk |
| 19 August 1918 | S919a | Greece | 80 | Sunk |
| 19 August 1918 | SS165 | Greece | 65 | Sunk |
| 19 August 1918 | V108a | Greece | 60 | Sunk |
| 19 August 1918 | V135 | Greece | 20 | Sunk |
| 19 August 1918 | V62a | Greece | 30 | Sunk |
| 24 August 1918 | AS19 | Greece | 35 | Sunk |
| 24 August 1918 | S275 | Greece | 35 | Sunk |
| 24 August 1918 | A59a | Greece | 35 | Sunk |
| 26 August 1918 | Evangtelistria | Greece | 20 | Sunk |
| 27 August 1918 | Unidentified Sailing Vessel | Greece | 31 | Sunk |
| 27 August 1918 | C57a | Greece | 14 | Sunk |
| 28 August 1918 | V214a | Greece | 12 | Sunk |
| 28 August 1918 | S804qu | Greece | 53 | Sunk |
| 29 August 1918 | A56a | Greece | 31 | Sunk |
| 29 August 1918 | 121B | Greece | 124 | Sunk |
| 30 August 1918 | HMS Endymion | Royal Navy | 7,350 | Damaged |
