= SM U-59 =

History

German Empire
- Name: U-59
- Ordered: 6 October 1914
- Builder: AG Weser, Bremen
- Yard number: 214
- Laid down: 13 July 1915
- Launched: 20 June 1916
- Commissioned: 7 September 1916
- Fate: Sunk 14 May 1917

General characteristics
- Class & type: Type U 57 submarine
- Displacement: 786 t (774 long tons) surfaced; 956 t (941 long tons) submerged
- Length: 67.00 m (219 ft 10 in) (o/a); 54.22 m (177 ft 11 in) (pressure hull)
- Beam: 6.32 m (20 ft 9 in) (oa); 4.05 m (13 ft 3 in) (pressure hull)
- Height: 8.05 m (26 ft 5 in)
- Draught: 3.79 m (12 ft 5 in)
- Installed power: 2 × 1,800 PS (1,324 kW; 1,775 shp) surfaced; 2 × 1,200 PS (883 kW; 1,184 shp) submerged
- Propulsion: 2 shafts
- Speed: 14.7 knots (27.2 km/h; 16.9 mph) surfaced; 8.4 knots (15.6 km/h; 9.7 mph) submerged
- Range: 7,730 nmi (14,320 km; 8,900 mi) at 8 knots (15 km/h; 9.2 mph) surfaced; 55 nmi (102 km; 63 mi) at 5 knots (9.3 km/h; 5.8 mph) submerged
- Test depth: 50 m (164 ft 1 in)
- Complement: 36
- Armament: 4 × 50 cm (19.7 in) torpedo tubes (two bow, two stern); 7 torpedoes; 1 × 10.5 cm (4.1 in) SK L/45 deck gun; 1 × 8.8 cm (3.5 in) SK L/30 deck gun

Service record
- Part of: II Flotilla; 20 November 1916 – 14 May 1917
- Commanders: Kptlt. Freiherr Wilhelm von Fircks; 7 September 1916 – 14 May 1917
- Operations: 4 patrols
- Victories: 14 merchant ships sunk (28,050 GRT); 1 merchant ship damaged (6,526 GRT)

SM U-59 (Note: "SM" stands for "Seiner Majestät" (English: His Majesty's) and combined with the U for Unterseeboot would be translated as His Majesty's Submarine.) was one of the 329 submarines serving in the Imperial German Navy in World War I. U-59 was engaged in the naval warfare and took part in the First Battle of the Atlantic. She struck a German mine and broke into two parts at Horns Reef (55°33′N 7°15′E) at about midnight on 14 May 1917. She lost 33 of her crew; there were 4 survivors. The wreck of U-59 was located in 2002.

The SM U-59 deck gun is on display at the Strandingsmuseum St. George Thorsminde.

== Summary of raiding history ==
Date	Name	Nationality	Tonnage (Note: Tonnages are in gross register tons)	Fate
7 December 1916	August	Sweden	341	Sunk
8 December 1916	Harry	Sweden	81	Sunk
13 January 1917	Solvang	Norway	2,970	Sunk
16 January 1917	Brenn	France	2,189	Sunk
19 January 1917	Gaea	Norway	1,002	Sunk
23 January 1917	Sardinia	Norway	1,500	Sunk
19 March 1917	Charlois	Netherlands	2,786	Sunk
20 March 1917	Gurre	Denmark	2,866	Sunk
21 March 1917	Najade	Norway	1,752	Sunk
31 March 1917	Valacia	United Kingdom	6,526	Damaged
2 April 1917	Snespurven	Norway	1,409	Sunk
5 April 1917	Canadian	United Kingdom	9,309	Sunk
6 April 1917	Amiral L’hermite	France	156	Sunk
6 April 1917	Roland	France	135	Sunk
9 April 1917	Fremad I	Norway	1,554	Sunk

== Bibliography ==
- Gröner, Erich; Jung, Dieter; Maass, Martin (1991). U-boats and Mine Warfare Vessels. German Warships 1815–1945. Vol. 2. Translated by Thomas, Keith; Magowan, Rachel. London: Conway Maritime Press. ISBN 0-85177-593-4.
