= SM U-79 =

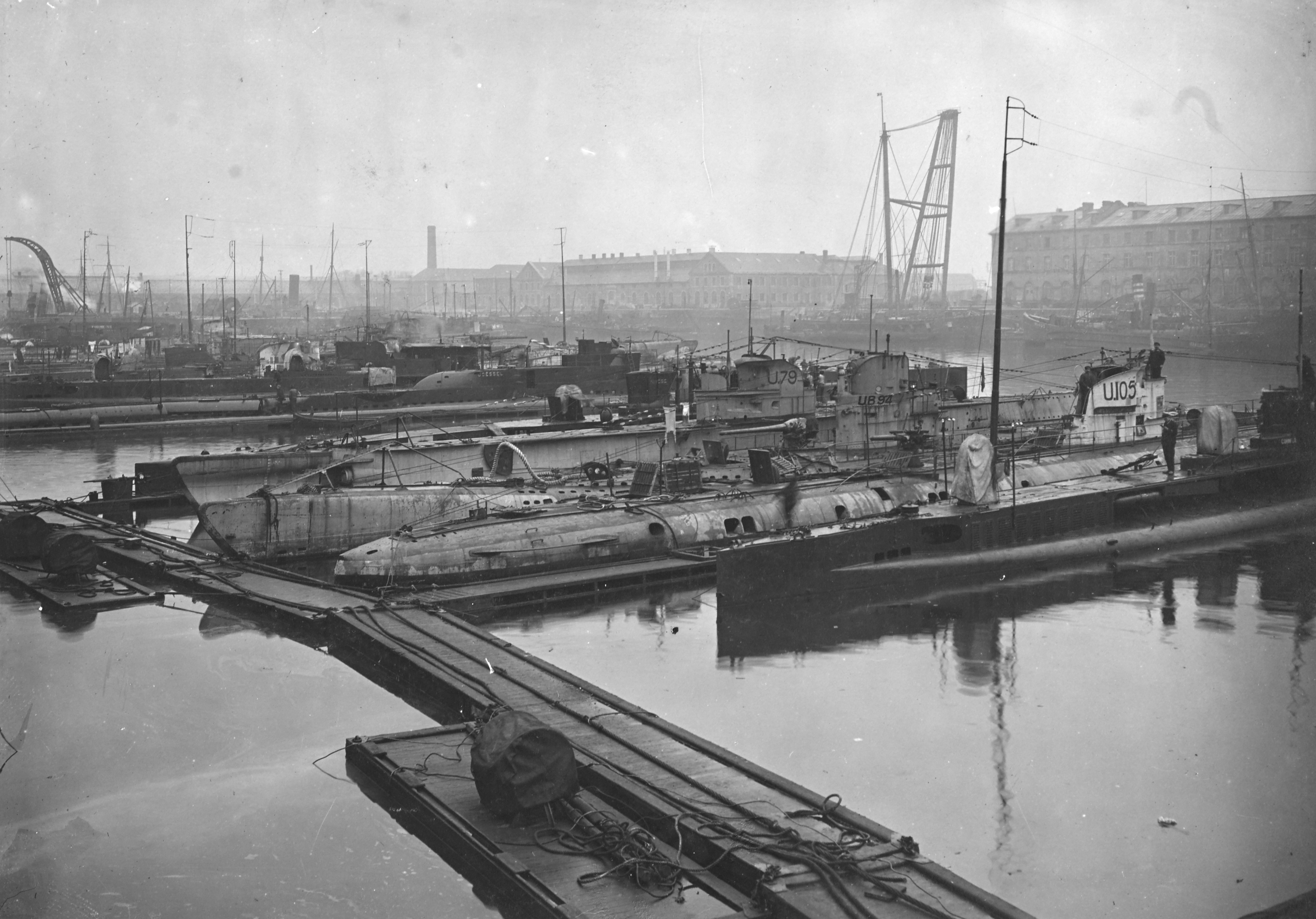
- U-79 in Cherbourg after the war, around 1920, together with U-105 and UB-94

History

German Empire
- Name: U-79
- Ordered: 6 January 1915
- Builder: AG Vulcan Stettin
- Yard number: 61
- Launched: 31 October 1915
- Commissioned: 26 January 1916
- Fate: Surrendered 21 November 1918

France
- Name: Victor Réveille
- Commissioned: 1922
- Fate: Broken up in 1936

General characteristics
- Class & type: Type UE I submarine
- Displacement: 755 t (743 long tons) surfaced; 832 t (819 long tons) submerged
- Length: 56.80 m (186 ft 4 in) (o/a); 46.66 m (153 ft 1 in) (pressure hull)
- Beam: 5.90 m (19 ft 4 in) (o/a); 5.00 m (16 ft 5 in) (pressure hull)
- Height: 8.25 m (27 ft 1 in)
- Draught: 4.86 m (15 ft 11 in)
- Installed power: 2 × 900 PS (662 kW; 888 shp) surfaced; 2 × 900 PS (662 kW; 888 shp) submerged
- Propulsion: 2 shafts, 2× 1.41 m (4 ft 8 in) propellers
- Speed: 9.9 knots (18.3 km/h; 11.4 mph) surfaced; 7.9 knots (14.6 km/h; 9.1 mph) submerged
- Range: 7,880 nmi (14,590 km; 9,070 mi) at 7 knots (13 km/h; 8.1 mph) surfaced; 83 nmi (154 km; 96 mi) at 4 knots (7.4 km/h; 4.6 mph) submerged
- Test depth: 50 m (164 ft 1 in)
- Complement: 4 officers, 28 enlisted
- Armament: 2 × 50 cm (19.7 in) torpedo tubes (one starboard bow, one starbord stern); 4 torpedoes; 1 × 8.8 cm (3.5 in) SK L/30 deck guns

Service record
- Part of: I Flotilla; 30 July 1916 – 11 November 1918
- Commanders: Kptlt. Heinrich Jeß; 25 May 1916 – 20 February 1917; Kptlt. Otto Rohrbeck; 21 February – 26 October 1917; Kptlt. Otto Dröscher; 27 October – 23 November 1917; Oblt.z.S. Karl Thouret; 24 November 1917 – 15 April 1918; Oblt.z.S. Rudolf (i.V.) Zentner; 16 April – 17 August 1918; Oblt.z.S. Martin Hoffmann; 18–26 August 1918; Lt.z.S. Rudolf (i.V.) Haagen; 27 August – 15 September 1918; Kptlt. Woldemar Petri; 16 September – 14 October 1918; Oblt.z.S. Kurt Slevogt; 15 October – 11 November 1918
- Operations: 9 patrols
- Victories: 19 merchant ships sunk (33,678 GRT); 1 warship sunk (14,300 tons); 3 auxiliary warships sunk (801 GRT); 2 merchant ships damaged (7,474 GRT); 1 warship damaged (790 tons); 1 merchant ship taken as prize (1,125 GRT)

SM U-79 was one of the 329 submarines serving in the Imperial German Navy (Imperial German Navy) in World War I. U-79 was engaged in the combat in the First Battle of the Atlantic.

After the war she was transferred to the French Navy, in which she served as Victor Réveille.

== Imperial German Navy ==
SM U-79 was commissioned by Kaptlt. Jess, who was replaced by Kaptlt. Rohrbeck in January 1917. Rohrbeck would be replaced by Kaptlt. Stevogt. U-79 came off the stocks at Hamburg (Vulcan) in 1916, and joined the Kiel School, where she is known to have been in July, and left Kiel for Wilhelmshaven about the end of July to join the 1st Half Flotilla.

Between 6 and 26 August 1916, she laid 34 mines off the south coast of Ireland. She fired on a special service vessel north-west of Ireland on the night of 19 August; the torpedo missed. In the period 26 September to 14 October 1916, she laid mines in the Firth of Clyde.

Patrolling off Portugal, via the English Channel, between 21 December 1916 and 28 January 1917, she sank eight steamers and one sailing ship, as well as capturing the Norwegian steamer Nanna on 24 January. On her return journey, by way of the Irish Channel, U-79 compelled Nanna to take her under tow to the Danish coast, likely as a result of engine damage she reported 26 January.

On 1 April 1917, she departed to lay mines in Inishtrahull Sound, but could not complete her task due to engine trouble, and returned on 21 April. She made three more minelaying patrols in 1917, one off the Butt of Lewis between 6 June and 4 July; one in Rathlin Sound and off Inishtrahull Island, between 12 September and 15 October, during which she also sank the armoured cruiser HMS Drake off Rathlin Island, 11 October, avoiding Heligoland Bight (per a 10 October general order) on her return; and one between 17 and 20 December, off the Dutch coast, transiting Heligoland Bight inbound and outbound on this occasion. She departed for a repeat of this mission 1 January 1918, but was forced to return 5 January due to compass trouble.

She carried out training off Augustenhof Lighthouse, in the Baltic Sea, from 5 to 9 February, before departing on her next patrol, to lay mines off the Netherlands, returning 19 February, again avoiding Heligoland.

British Naval Intelligence (better known as Room 40) records her at Norderney on 2 May 1918, and possibly in the Elbe on 9 November. On 21 November 1918, she was surrendered at Harwich.

=== Summary of raiding history ===
Date	Name	Nationality	Tonnage (Note: Merchant ship tonnages are in gross register tons. Military vessels are listed by tons displacement.)	Fate
14 September 1916	Counsellor	United Kingdom	4,958	Sunk
26 December 1916	Johan	Denmark	828	Sunk
27 December 1916	Copsewood	United Kingdom	599	Sunk
27 December 1916	Ida	Norway	1,300	Sunk
30 December 1916	Danmark	Denmark	1,875	Sunk
1 January 1917	Laupar	Norway	1,407	Sunk
2 January 1917	Older	Norway	2,256	Sunk
3 January 1917	Angela	Italy	2,422	Sunk
3 January 1917	Valladares	Portugal	124	Sunk
4 January 1917	Chinto Maru	Japan	2,592	Sunk
10 January 1917	Brookwood	United Kingdom	3,093	Sunk
24 January 1917	Nanna	Norway	1,125	Captured as prize
14 June 1917	Carthaginian	United Kingdom	4,444	Sunk
22 June 1917	Maggie	Norway	1,118	Sunk
23 June 1917	HMT Corientes	Royal Navy	280	Sunk
26 June 1917	HMT Charles Astie	Royal Navy	295	Sunk
26 June 1917	Serapis	United Kingdom	1,932	Sunk
30 June 1917	Bröderna	Sweden	39	Sunk
30 June 1917	Lancaster	Sweden	77	Sunk
30 June 1917	Preceptor	Sweden	55	Sunk
13 August 1917	Camito	United Kingdom	6,611	Damaged
2 October 1917	HMS Brisk	Royal Navy	790	Damaged
2 October 1917	HMS Drake	Royal Navy	14,300	Sunk
2 October 1917	Lugano	United Kingdom	3,810	Sunk
23 October 1917	HMT Earl Lennox	Royal Navy	226	Sunk
12 January 1918	Caledonia	Netherlands	863	Damaged
15 January 1918	Westpolder	Netherlands	749	Sunk

== French Navy ==
U-79 was surrendered to the Allies at Harwich on 21 November 1918 in accordance with the requirements of the Armistice with Germany. She was transferred to France and commissioned as Victor Réveille in 1922. On 23 November 1923, she ran aground at Boulogne, Pas de Calais, France. She was refloated, repaired, and returned to service.

Reduced to reserve in 1930, the boat was stricken on 27 July 1935, condemned two days later, and sold to L'Hermitte (Brest) for FF 70,642 on 6 August 1936, to be broken up.

== See also ==
- Room 40

== Bibliography ==
- Gardiner, Robert (1985). Conway′s All the World′s Fighting Ships 1906-1921. New York: Mayflower Books. ISBN 0-8317-0303-2.
- Gardiner, Robert (1985). Conway′s All the World′s Fighting Ships 1922-1946. Annapolis, Maryland: Naval Institute Press. ISBN 0-87021-907-3.
- Gröner, Erich; Jung, Dieter; Maass, Martin (1991). U-boats and Mine Warfare Vessels. German Warships 1815–1945. Vol. 2. Translated by Thomas, Keith; Magowan, Rachel. London: Conway Maritime Press. ISBN 0-85177-593-4.
- Spindler, Arno (1966) [1932]. Der Handelskrieg mit U-Booten. 5 Vols. Berlin: Mittler & Sohn. Vols. 4+5, dealing with 1917+18, are very hard to find: Guildhall Library, London, has them all, also Vol. 1-3 in an English translation: The submarine war against commerce.
- Beesly, Patrick (1982). Room 40: British Naval Intelligence 1914-1918. London: H Hamilton. ISBN 978-0-241-10864-2.
- Halpern, Paul G. (1995). A Naval History of World War I. New York: Routledge. ISBN 978-1-85728-498-0.
- Roessler, Eberhard (1997). Die Unterseeboote der Kaiserlichen Marine. Bonn: Bernard & Graefe. ISBN 978-3-7637-5963-7.
- Schroeder, Joachim (2002). Die U-Boote des Kaisers. Bonn: Bernard & Graefe. ISBN 978-3-7637-6235-4.
- Koerver, Hans Joachim (2008). Room 40: German Naval Warfare 1914-1918. Vol I., The Fleet in Action. Steinbach: LIS Reinisch. ISBN 978-3-902433-76-3.
- Koerver, Hans Joachim (2009). Room 40: German Naval Warfare 1914-1918. Vol II., The Fleet in Being. Steinbach: LIS Reinisch. ISBN 978-3-902433-77-0.
