= SS Tampico =

Several merchant ships have been named SS Tampico including:

- SS Tampico (1900), a US bulk freighter launched in 1900 and scuttled in 1968.
- SS Tampico (1908), a tanker launched in 1908 as Carpathian, renamed British Peer in 1918 and Tampico in 1933. Sunk in 1945.
- SS Tampico (1944), a Type T2-SE-A1 tanker launched in 1944, renamed Esso Reading in 1946, reverted to Tampico in 1961 and renamed American Hawk in 1976. Scrapped in 1982
