= List of shipwrecks in December 1916 =

The list of shipwrecks in December 1916 includes ships sunk, foundered, grounded, or otherwise lost during December 1916.

== 1 December ==
List of shipwrecks: 1 December 1916
Ship	State	Description
Barge #792	United States	The barge sank near Faulkners Island, Connecticut.
Bossi	Norway	World War I: The cargo ship was scuttled in the Atlantic Ocean 33 nautical miles (61 km) west south west of The Lizard, Cornwall, United Kingdom (49°38′N 5°50′W) by SM UB-29 (Imperial German Navy). Her crew survived.
Briardene	United Kingdom	World War I: The cargo ship was scuttled in the Atlantic Ocean 12.5 nautical miles (23.2 km) south east by east of the Bishop Rock, Isles of Scilly (49°45′N 6°11′W) by SM UB-29 (Imperial German Navy). Her crew survived.
Burcombe	United Kingdom	World War I: The cargo ship was torpedoed and sunk in the Mediterranean Sea 100 nautical miles (190 km) south east by east of Malta (35°20′N 16°23′E) by SM UC-22 (Imperial German Navy) with the loss of three of her crew.
Camellia	United Kingdom	World War I: The fishing smack struck a mine and sank in the Atlantic Ocean off the Eddystone Lighthouse with the loss of three of her crew.
Cuore di Gesu	Italy	World War I: The brigantine was sunk in the Tyrrhenian Sea by SM U-32 (Imperial German Navy).
Douglas	Sweden	World War I: The cargo ship was sunk in the North Sea 120 nautical miles (220 km) off Lindesnes, Lister og Mandal county, Norway (56°36′N 4°37′E) by SM U-81 (Imperial German Navy). Her crew survived.
HMS E37	Royal Navy	The E-class submarine was lost in the North Sea with the loss of all 30 crew.
E.L.G.	United Kingdom	World War I: The fishing smack was scuttled in the Atlantic Ocean 25 nautical miles (46 km) north west of Trevose Head, Cornwall by an Imperial German Navy submarine.
Erich Lindoe	Norway	World War I: The cargo ship was sunk in the Atlantic Ocean 150 nautical miles (280 km) off Ouessant, Finistère, France (47°45′N 7°48′W) by SM UB-37 (Imperial German Navy). Her crew survived.
Indiana	France	World War I: The barquentine was scuttled in the Atlantic Ocean 5 nautical miles (9.3 km) north west of Trevose Head, Cornwall, (50°41′N 5°10′W) by SM UB-18 (Imperial German Navy). Her seven crew survived.
Jeanne d'Arc	France	World War I: The schooner was scuttled in the English Channel 10 nautical miles (19 km) north of the Île de Batz, Finistère by SM UB-39 (Imperial German Navy). Her crew survived.
Kediri	Netherlands	World War I: The cargo ship was torpedoed and sunk in the Atlantic Ocean 10 nautical miles (19 km) south south east of Maspalomas, Canary Isles, Spain by SM U-47 (Imperial German Navy).
King Bleddyn	United Kingdom	World War I: The cargo ship was scuttled in the Atlantic Ocean 30 nautical miles (56 km) south by west of Ouessant (47°54′N 5°07′W) by SM UC-21 (Imperial German Navy). Her crew survived.
Lampo	Italy	World War I: The sailing vessel was sunk in the Tyrrhenian Sea by SM U-32 (Imperial German Navy).
René Montrieux	France	World War I: The schooner was scuttled in the Atlantic Ocean off Ouessant (48°37′N 5°01′W) by SM UC-19 (Imperial German Navy). Her crew survived.
Saint Joseph	France	World War I: The schooner was scuttled in the Atlantic Ocean 15 nautical miles (28 km) north north west of Trevose Head (50°46′N 4°52′W) by SM UB-18 (Imperial German Navy). Her crew survived, they were rescued by Cran (Norway).
T. and A.C.	United Kingdom	World War I: The fishing smack was scuttled in the Atlantic Ocean 20 nautical miles (37 km) north north west of Trevose Head (50°50′N 5°30′W) by SM UB-18 (Imperial German Navy). Her crew survived.

== 2 December ==
List of shipwrecks: 2 December 1916
Ship	State	Description
HMT Adequate	Royal Navy	The naval trawler was lost on this date.
Angelo Madre G.	Italy	World War I: The brigantine was sunk in the Mediterranean Sea off Isola Rossa, Sardinia (42°44′N 8°48′E) by SM U-32 (Imperial German Navy).
Bravo	Spain	World War I: The cargo ship was torpedoed and sunk in the Atlantic Ocean off Ouessant, Finistère, France by SM U-39 (Imperial German Navy).
Demetrios Inglesis	Greece	World War I: The cargo ship was sunk in the Atlantic Ocean off Ouessant, Finistère, France by SM UC-21 (Imperial German Navy). Her crew survived.
France Chérie	United Kingdom	The cargo ship sprang a leak and was beached at Sutton Harbour, Devon.
Godafoss	Denmark	The mailboat ran aground at Straumnes, Iceland and was wrecked.
Harpalus	United Kingdom	World War I: The cargo ship was scuttled in the Atlantic Ocean 34 nautical miles (63 km) south south west of Galley Head, County Cork (50°56′N 8°58′W) by SM UB-23 (Imperial German Navy). Her crew survived.
Hitterøy	Norway	World War I: The cargo ship was scuttled in the Atlantic Ocean 26 nautical miles (48 km) west south west of the Bishop Rock, Isles of Scilly, United Kingdom (49°42′N 7°04′W) by SM UB-29 (Imperial German Navy). Her crew survived.
Istrar	United Kingdom	World War I: The cargo ship was torpedoed and sunk in the Mediterranean Sea 120 nautical miles (220 km) north north west of Alexandria, Egypt (33°15′N 28°20′E) by SM U-39 (Imperial German Navy) with the loss of a crew member. One of the survivors was taken as a prisoner of war.
Luigi C.	Italy	World War I: The sailing vessel was sunk in the Mediterranean Sea off Isola Rossa, Sardinia by SM U-63 (Imperial German Navy).
Palacine	Canada	World War I: The cargo ship was scuttled in the Atlantic Ocean 18 nautical miles (33 km) east north east of Ouessant (48°40′N 4°43′W) by SM UB-39 (Imperial German Navy). Her crew survived.
Robinson	France	World War I: The brig was scuttled in the Atlantic Ocean 15 nautical miles (28 km) west north west of Ouessant (48°32′N 5°25′W) by SM UC-21 (Imperial German Navy). Her crew were rescued by Ardent (French Navy).
Roma	Italy	World War I: The barque was sunk in the Mediterranean Sea off Isola Rossa (42°45′N 8°58′E) by SM U-63 (Imperial German Navy).
Palermo	Italy	World War I: The passenger ship was sunk in the Mediterranean Sea 25 nautical miles (46 km) off Cape San Sebastian, Spain by SM U-72 (Imperial German Navy).
Rebecca B. Douglas	United States	The schooner was stranded at Crabtree Point, Frenchmans Bay, Maine.
Skjodulf	Norway	World War I: The cargo ship was sunk in the Atlantic Ocean 26 nautical miles (48 km) south of the Longships Lighthouse (49°45′N 6°13′W) by SM UB-18 (Imperial German Navy). Her crew survived.
Uribitarte	Spain	World War I: The cargo ship was sunk in the Atlantic Ocean 15 nautical miles (28 km) south west of Ouessant by SM UC-21 (Imperial German Navy). Her crew survived.
Voltaire	United Kingdom	World War I: The cargo ship was sunk in the Atlantic Ocean 650 nautical miles (1,200 km) west of the Fastnet Rock by SMS Möwe (Imperial German Navy). Her crew were taken as prisoners of war.

== 3 December ==
List of shipwrecks: 3 December 1916
Ship	State	Description
Aiglon	France	World War I: The barquentine was sunk in the Atlantic Ocean 35 nautical miles (65 km) north north west of Ouessant, Finistère by SM UC-21 (Imperial German Navy).
Căpitan Valter Mărăcineanu	Royal Romanian Navy	World War I: The Captain Nicolae Lascar Bogdan-class river torpedo boat was sunk by a mine on the Danube.
Dacia	United Kingdom	World War I: While diverting the German South American submarine cable, the cable layer was torpedoed and sunk at Funchal, Madeira, Portugal by SM U-38 (Imperial German Navy). Her crew survived.
Kanguroo	France	Kanguroo (right) with Dacia in the background. World War I: The 2,493-gross register ton submarine carrier and auxiliary transport was torpedoed and sunk in the Atlantic Ocean off Funchal, Madeira by the submarine SM U-38 (Imperial German Navy).
Louise	France	World War I: The schooner was scuttled in the English Channel (49°17′N 5°17′W) by SM UC-21 (Imperial German Navy). Her crew were rescued by Kalfond (Norway).
Mizpah	United Kingdom	World War I: The ketch was scuttled in the Atlantic Ocean 30 nautical miles (56 km) south south east of the Eddystone Lighthouse (49°47′N 3°40′W) by SM UB-18 (Imperial German Navy). Her crew survived.
HMS Perugia	Royal Navy	World War I: The Q-ship was sunk in the Gulf of Genoa (42°54′N 7°39′E) by SM U-63 (Imperial German Navy).
Plata	Italy	World War I: The cargo ship was sunk in the Mediterranean Sea 33°40′N 28°10′E) by SM U-39 (Imperial German Navy). Her crew survived.
Primevere	France	World War I: The schooner was sunk in the Atlantic Ocean 12 nautical miles (22 km) north of the Stiff Lighthouse, Finistère by SM UB-39 (Imperial German Navy). Her crew survived.
HMT Remarko	Royal Navy	World War I: The naval trawler struck a mine placed by SM UC-4 (Imperial German Navy) and sank in the North Sea off Lowestoft, Suffolk (54°20′N 1°53′E) with the loss of twelve of her crew.
Seeker	United Kingdom	World War I: The schooner was scuttled in the English Channel 30 nautical miles (56 km) north west of the Les Hanois Lighthouse, Guernsey, Channel Islands by SM UB-18 (Imperial German Navy). Her crew survived.
Surprise	French Navy	World War I: The 646-ton Surprise-class gunboat was torpedoed and sunk off Funchal by the submarine SM U-38 (Imperial German Navy).
Verdun	France	World War I: The ship was sunk in the Bay of Biscay off the Glénan Islands, Finistère (47°19′N 5°32′W) by SM UC-21 (Imperial German Navy). Her crew survived.
William E. Cleary	United States	The steamer sank in the harbor at New London, Connecticut.
Yrsa	Denmark	World War I: The coaster was sunk in the English Channel 30 nautical miles (56 km) west north west of Guernsey by SM UB-18 (Imperial German Navy). Her crew survived.

== 4 December ==
List of shipwrecks: 4 December 1916
Ship	State	Description
Algerie	France	World War I: The passenger ship was sunk in the Mediterranean Sea 145 nautical miles (269 km) south east of Malta by SM UC-22 (Imperial German Navy).
Caledonia	United Kingdom	World War I: The passenger ship was torpedoed and sunk in the Mediterranean Sea 125 nautical miles (232 km) east by south of Malta (35°40′N 17°05′E) by SM U-65 (Imperial German Navy) with the loss of a crew member. Her captain was taken as a prisoner of war.
Fofo	Greece	World War I: The cargo ship was scuttled in the Atlantic Ocean 40 nautical miles (74 km) off Ouessant, Finistère, France by SM UB-37 (Imperial German Navy). Her crew survived.
Hallbjørg	Norway	World War I: The cargo ship was sunk with scuttling charges in the Atlantic Ocean (49°09′N 26°08′W) by SMS Möwe (Imperial German Navy).
Nervion	Norway	World War I: The cargo ship was sunk in the Atlantic Ocean south of the Fastnet Rock by SM UB-23 (Imperial German Navy). Her 24 crew were rescued by Zaanland (Netherlands).
Pallas	Russia	World War I: The cargo ship was sunk in the Atlantic Ocean 32 nautical miles (59 km) south west of Ar Men, Finistère (47°50′N 5°52′W) by SM UC-21 (Imperial German Navy).
Senta	Sweden	World War I: The barque was sunk in the Kattegat 5 nautical miles (9.3 km) south west of Ryvingen Lighthouse, Lister og Mandal county, Norway by SM U-58 (Imperial German Navy). Her crew survived.

== 5 December ==
List of shipwrecks: 5 December 1916
Ship	State	Description
Dorit	Denmark	World War I: The three-masted schooner was sunk in the North Sea 100 nautical miles (190 km) west of Hanstholm, Nordjylland by SM U-82 (Imperial German Navy). Her crew survived.
Ella	Norway	World War I: The coaster was sunk in the North Sea by SM U-82 (Imperial German Navy). Her crew survived.
Grigorios Anghelatos	Greece	World War I: The cargo ship was sunk in the Gulf of Genoa 20 nautical miles (37 km) south of Genoa, Italy (43°52′N 8°49′E) by SM U-63 (Imperial German Navy). Her crew survived.
Nexos	Denmark	World War I: The cargo ship was sunk in the Atlantic Ocean 26 nautical miles (48 km) west south west of Ar Men, Finistère, France (48°02′N 5°40′W) by SM UC-21 (Imperial German Navy). Her crew survived.
Pio IX	Spain	The cargo ship foundered in the Atlantic Ocean 800 nautical miles (1,500 km) south east of Madeira, Portugal. Twenty-two of her 61 crew were rescued by Buenos Ayres (flag unknown) and another vessel.
Stettin	Norway	World War I: The coaster was scuttled in the North Sea 48 nautical miles (89 km) south west by west of Slotterø, Rogaland (59°20′N 3°49′E) by SM U-58 (Imperial German Navy). Her crew survived.
HMT Tervani	Royal Navy	World War I: The naval trawler struck a mine placed by SM UC-4 (Imperial German Navy) and sank in the North Sea off Orfordness, Suffolk (52°06′00″N 1°39′30″E) with the loss of a crew member.

== 6 December ==
List of shipwrecks: 6 December 1916
Ship	State	Description
Amicitia	Norway	World War I: The cargo ship was sunk in the Atlantic Ocean 120 nautical miles (220 km) south west of Ouessant, Finistère, France by SM UB-39 (Imperial German Navy). Her crew survived.
Ans	Russia	World War I: The three-masted schooner was scuttled in the Atlantic Ocean 15 nautical miles (28 km) south west of the Bishop Rock, Isles of Scilly, United Kingdom (49°42′N 6°43′W) by SM UB-29 (Imperial German Navy).
Campania	Italy	World War I: The cargo ship was shelled and sunk in the Tyrrhenian Sea (41°20′N 11°30′E) by SM U-32 (Imperial German Navy)
Christine	Denmark	World War I: The three-masted schooner was sunk in the North Sea 110 nautical miles (200 km) west of Hanstholm, Nordjylland (56°53′N 5°23′E) by SM U-82 (Imperial German Navy).
Duchess of Cornwall	United Kingdom	World War I: The sailing vessel was sunk in the Atlantic Ocean 650 nautical miles (1,200 km) west of the Fastnet Rock by SMS Möwe (Imperial German Navy): Her crew were taken as prisoners of war.
Gerona	Spain	World War I: The cargo ship was sunk in the English Channel (49°04′N 6°20′W) by SM UC-21 (Imperial German Navy). Her crew survived.
Halfdan	Denmark	World War I: The cargo ship was torpedoed and sunk in the Atlantic Ocean 20 nautical miles (37 km) south of the Eddystone Lighthouse by SM UB-37 (Imperial German Navy). Her crew survived.
Marie	Denmark	World War I: The three-masted schooner was scuttled in the Atlantic Ocean 10 nautical miles (19 km) west of the Bishop Rock (49°50′N 6°41′W) by SM UB-29 (Imperial German Navy). Her crew survived.
Mount Temple	United Kingdom	World War I: The cargo ship was captured and scuttled in the Atlantic Ocean 1,200 nautical miles (2,200 km) north of the Azores, Portugal by SMS Möwe (Imperial German Navy with the loss of four of her crew.
Robert	Denmark	World War I: The barque was sunk in the North Sea 110 nautical miles (200 km) west of Hanstholm by SM U-82 (Imperial German Navy). Her crew survived.
Shchit	Imperial Russian Navy	World War I: The minesweeper struck a mine placed by SM UC-25 (Imperial German Navy) and sank in the Baltic Sea.
SM UC-19	Imperial German Navy	World War I: The Type UC II submarine was depth charged and sunk in the English Channel (49°41′N 6°31′W) by HMS Ariel (Royal Navy) with the loss of all 25 crew.

== 7 December ==
List of shipwrecks: 7 December 1916
Ship	State	Description
August	Sweden	World War I: The barquentine was sunk in the North Sea by SM U-59 (Imperial German Navy). Her crew survived.
Avristan	United Kingdom	World War I: The cargo ship was torpedoed and sunk in the Atlantic Ocean 14 nautical miles (26 km) south by west of Ouessant, Finistère, France (47°13′N 5°12′W) by SM UC-21 (Imperial German Navy) with the loss of a crew member.
Bato	France	The cargo ship caught fire and sank at Addah, French West Africa.
Bravo	Spain	World War I: The cargo ship was sunk in the Atlantic Ocean 7 nautical miles (13 km) south west of the Créac'h Lighthouse, Finistère by SM UB-39 (Imperial German Navy). Her crew survived.
Marguerite Dollfus	France	World War I: The barque was scuttled in the English Channel 35 nautical miles (65 km) north west of Guernsey, Channel Islands (49°45′N 3°40′W) by SM UB-37 (Imperial German Navy). Her crew were rescued by Baltic (Norway).
Meteor	Norway	World War I: The cargo ship was torpedoed and sunk in the Atlantic Ocean south west of the Isles of Scilly (49°23′N 7°54′W) by SM UB-29 or SM UC-19 (Imperial German Navy). Her crew survived.
Reliance	United States	The tugboat sank in heavy seas when her tow caused her to heel over and fill between the breakwaters in Limon Bay, Panama Canal Zone in 40 feet (12 m) of water. Her master and at least two crew died. The rest of crew were rescued by launches from the Port Captain's Office.
Spyros	Greece	World War I: The cargo ship was sunk in the Atlantic Ocean south of Fuerteventura, Canary Islands, Spain (28°00′N 14°20′W) by SM U-47 (Imperial German Navy).
SM UB-46	Imperial German Navy	World War I: The Type UB II submarine struck a mine and sank in the Black Sea off Akpına, Turkey with the loss of all twenty crew.

== 8 December ==
List of shipwrecks: 8 December 1916
Ship	State	Description
Bob	United States	The barge broke up and sank in the Gulf of Mexico in a heavy gale between Tampico, Mexico and Texas City, Texas, a total loss. One crewman killed, the other three made it to shore near Brownsville, Texas.
Brask	Norway	World War I: The cargo ship was sunk in the Atlantic Ocean west of Gibraltar (37°46′N 9°26′W) by SM U-38 (Imperial German Navy). Her crew survived.
Britannia	United Kingdom	World War I: The cargo ship was torpedoed and sunk in the Atlantic Ocean 70 nautical miles (130 km) west of Cape Sines, Portugal (37°18′N 10°29′W) by SM U-38 (Imperial German Navy) with the loss of two of her 40 crew. Her captain was taken as a prisoner of war.
Carmelina Dominici	Italy	World War I: The sailing vessel was sunk in the Tyrrhenian Sea by SM U-32 (Imperial German Navy).
Conch	United Kingdom	World War I: The tanker was torpedoed and sunk in the English Channel 10 nautical miles (19 km) south of Poole, Dorset (50°23′N 2°02′W) by SM UB-23 (Imperial German Navy) with the loss of 28 of her 31 crew.
HMT Dagon	Royal Navy	World War I: The naval trawler struck a mine placed by SM UC-21 (Imperial German Navy) and sank in the English Channel off the Royal Sovereign Lightship (United Kingdom) with the loss of twelve of her crew.
Falk	Norway	World War I: The cargo ship was sunk in the Atlantic Ocean 15 nautical miles (28 km) south west of Penmarc'h, Finistère, France by SM UC-21 (Imperial German Navy). Her crew survived.
Harry	Sweden	World War I: The sailing vessel was sunk in the North Sea (56°10′N 2°18′E) by SM U-59 (Imperial German Navy). Her crew survived.
HMS Kent County	Royal Navy	The Q-ship was lost on this date.
King George	United Kingdom	World War I: The cargo ship was sunk in the Atlantic Ocean 700 nautical miles (1,300 km) east of Cape Race, Newfoundland by SMS Möwe (Imperial German Navy). Her crew were taken as prisoners of war.
Marjolaine	France	World War I: The sailing vessel was sunk in the Atlantic Ocean 10 nautical miles (19 km) west of Penmarc'h by SM UC-21 (Imperial German Navy).
Modum	Norway	World War I: The cargo ship was sunk in the Atlantic Ocean south south west of Penmarc'h (47°38′N 4°19′W) by SM UC-21 (Imperial German Navy). Her crew survived.
Rakiura	Norway	World War I: The cargo ship was sunk in the Atlantic Ocean 60 nautical miles (110 km) west south west of the Casquets, Channel Islands by SM UB-39 (Imperial German Navy). Her crew survived.
Rollo	Denmark	World War I: The cargo ship was sunk in the Atlantic Ocean 35 nautical miles (65 km) north of the Île de Batz, Finistère (49°12′N 3°40′W) by SM UB-39 (Imperial German Navy). Her crew survived.
Saga	Norway	World War I: The coaster was sunk in the Atlantic Ocean 50 nautical miles (93 km) west north west of Guernsey, Channel Islands by SM UB-39 (Imperial German Navy). Her crew survived.

== 9 December ==
List of shipwrecks: 9 December 1916
Ship	State	Description
Brizella	Portugal	World War I: The brigantine was sunk in the Atlantic Ocean west of Gibraltar (38°05′N 10°02′W) by SM U-38 (Imperial German Navy).
Cambrian Prince	United Kingdom	World War I: The cargo ship was scuttled in the Atlantic Ocean 610 nautical miles (1,130 km) east of Cape Race, Newfoundland by SMS Möwe (Imperial German Navy). Her crew were taken as prisoners of war.
Forth	United Kingdom	World War I: The cargo ship struck a mine and sank in the North Sea 4 nautical miles (7.4 km) south west of the Shipwash Lightship (United Kingdom). Her crew survived.
Harlington	United Kingdom	World War I: The cargo ship struck a mine placed by SM UC-11 (Imperial German Navy) and sank in the North Sea 4 nautical miles (7.4 km) south west of the Shipwash Lightship (United Kingdom) with the loss of seven of her crew.
Harlyn	United Kingdom	World War I: The cargo ship struck a mine placed by SM UC-11 (Imperial German Navy) and sank in the North Sea 4 nautical miles (7.4 km) south west of the Shipwash Lightship (United Kingdom) with the loss of two of her crew.
Louise B.	France	The schooner was wrecked at Port-de-Bouc, Bouches-du-Rhône. Her crew were rescued.

== 10 December ==
List of shipwrecks: 10 December 1916
Ship	State	Description
Agder	Norway	World War I: The coaster was sunk in the North Sea 84 nautical miles (156 km) west of Utsire, Rogaland by SM U-24 (Imperial German Navy). Her crew survived.
Emma Laurans	France	World War I: The barque was shelled and sunk in the Atlantic Ocean off the Canary Islands, Spain (27°48′N 23°16′W) by SM U-52 (Imperial German Navy). Her crew survived, they were rescued by U-52 and landed in the Canary Isles on 12 December.
Esemplare	Italy	World War I: The cargo ship was sunk in the Atlantic Ocean west of Gibraltar (36°38′N 8°22′W) by SM U-38 (Imperial German Navy). Her crew survived.
Georgic	United Kingdom	World War I: The cargo ship was torpedoed and sunk in the Atlantic Ocean 590 nautical miles (1,090 km) east south east of Cape Race, Newfoundland by SMS Möwe (Imperial German Navy) with the loss of a crew member. The survivors were taken as prisoners of war.
Gerda	Norway	World War I: The barque was set afire and sunk in the North Sea by SM U-82 (Imperial German Navy). Her crew survived.
Powhatan	United States	The steamer was rammed and sunk by Telena (United Kingdom) near Old Point Comfort east north east of Thimble Shoal Light in Hampton Roads, sinking in 20 feet (6.1 m) of water. She was later refloated, but beached on a mudbank and abandoned. She was refloated by new owners in 1919, taken to Brooklyn, New York, repaired and returned to service. The crew were rescued by Jamestown (United States).
Strathalbyn	United Kingdom	World War I: The cargo ship struck a mine and sank in the English Channel off Cherbourg, Seine-Inférieure, France. Her crew survived.
Unknown piledriver	United States	The piledriver sank off Saybrook, Connecticut.

== 11 December ==
List of shipwrecks: 11 December 1916
Ship	State	Description
Bjor	Norway	World War I: The cargo ship was sunk in the North Sea 4 nautical miles (7.4 km) off the Ryvingen Lighthouse, Lister og Mandal county, Norway by SM U-66 (Imperial German Navy). Her fifteen crew survived.
Francis Mulqueen	United States	The barge sank off Point Judith, Rhode Island, in a gale and heavy seas, a total loss.
Inger	Denmark	World War I: The coaster was sunk in the English Channel 15 nautical miles (28 km) south south west of St Catherine's Point, Isle of Wight, United Kingdom by SM UC-18 (Imperial German Navy). Her crew survived.
Jeanne	Italy	World War I: The sailing vessel was sunk in the Mediterranean Sea south of Sardinia by SM U-72 (Imperial German Navy).
Magellan	France	World War I: The passenger ship was sunk in the Mediterranean Sea 10 nautical miles (19 km) south of Pantellaria, Italy (36°36′N 12°10′E) by SM U-63 (Imperial German Navy). Her crew survived.
Nora	Denmark	World War I: The coaster struck a mine placed by SM UC-10 (Imperial German Navy) and sank in the North Sea 7 nautical miles (13 km) south of Withernsea, Yorkshire, United Kingdom (54°05′N 0°55′E) with the loss of four of her crew.
Palander	Sweden	World War I: The three-masted schooner was sunk in the North Sea off Oxø by SM U-66 (Imperial German Navy). Her crew survived.
Regina Margherita	Regia Marina	World War I: The Regina Margherita-class battleship struck a mine and sank in the Adriatic Sea off Vlorë, Albania, with the loss of 675 of her 945 crew.
Sinai	France	World War I: The cargo ship was sunk in the Mediterranean Sea 3 nautical miles (5.6 km) south of Pantellaria (36°35′N 12°12′E) by SM U-63 (Imperial German Navy). Her crew survived.
St. Daniel	United States	The barge sank off Point Judith, Rhode Island in a gale and heavy seas, or went to pieces after going ashore at Narragansett Pier, Narragansett, Rhode Island, a total loss.
USAT Sumner	United States Army	The United States Army Transport was wrecked on Barnegat Shoals 300 yards (274 m) off Barnegat City, New Jersey. All 232 passengers and crew survived and were taken aboard the cutter USCGC Seneca ( United States Coast Guard) and the wrecking tug Rescue (United States). She broke in two and was still visible in March 1917. Her wreck eventually sank in 25 feet (8 m) of water.

== 12 December ==
List of shipwrecks: 12 December 1916
Ship	State	Description
Coath	United Kingdom	World War I: The coaster was sunk in the English Channel 3 nautical miles (5.6 km) south west of Eastbourne, Sussex by SM UB-38 (Imperial German Navy) with the loss of sixteen of her crew.
Conrad	United Kingdom	World War I: The schooner was scuttled in the English Channel 45 nautical miles (83 km) south south east of St. Catherine's Point, Isle of Wight (50°05′N 0°40′W) by SM UB-38 (Imperial German Navy). Her crew survived.
Ørnen	Norway	The fishing steamer disappeared with her crew of 19 off Sula in Møre og Romsdal, Norway.
St. Ursula	United Kingdom	World War I: The cargo ship was torpedoed and sunk in the Mediterranean Sea 45 nautical miles (83 km) south east by south of Malta by SM U-32 (Imperial German Navy) with the loss of four crew.

== 13 December ==
List of shipwrecks: 13 December 1916
Ship	State	Description
Angelo Parodi	Italy	World War I: The cargo ship was sunk in the Mediterranean Sea 6 nautical miles (11 km) off Cabo Tinoso, Spain (37°18′N 1°25′W) by SM U-38 (Imperial German Navy).
Bretwalda	United Kingdom	World War I: The cargo ship was torpedoed and sunk in the Mediterranean Sea 220 nautical miles (410 km) east by south of Malta (35°30′N 19°05′E) by SM UB-43 (Imperial German Navy). Her crew survived.
Kaupanger	Norway	World War I: The cargo ship was sunk in the Mediterranean Sea 20 nautical miles (37 km) off Cartagena, Murcia, Spain (37°23′N 0°48′W) by SM U-38 (Imperial German Navy). Her crew survived.
Salamis	Greece	World War I: The cargo ship was scuttled in the Atlantic Ocean off Gran Canaria, Canary Islands, Spain by SM U-47 (Imperial German Navy).
Solon	Denmark	World War I: The schooner was sunk in the North Sea 25 nautical miles (46 km) west of Hanstholm, Nordjylland by SM U-71 (Imperial German Navy). Her crew survived.
SM UB-29	Imperial German Navy	World War I: The Type UB II submarine was depth charged and sunk in the English Channel south of the Goodwin Sands, Kent, United Kingdom (51°09′N 1°46′E) by HMS Landrail (Royal Navy) with the loss of all 22 crew.
Vala	Sweden	World War I: The cargo ship, en route from Malmö to Blyth, Northumberland, struck a mine and sank in the North Sea off Hanstholm. Her crew survived.

== 14 December ==
List of shipwrecks: 14 December 1916
Ship	State	Description
Burnhope	United Kingdom	World War I: The cargo ship struck a mine placed by SM UC-32 (Imperial German Navy) and sank at Hartlepool, County Durham with the loss of a crew member.
Glencoe	United Kingdom	World War I: The cargo ship was torpedoed and sunk in the Bay of Biscay 14 nautical miles (26 km) north north west of the Île d'Yeu, Vendée, France (46°54′N 2°38′W) by SM UC-18 (Imperial German Navy). Her crew survived.
Leca	Portugal	World War I: The cargo ship was shelled and sunk in the Bay of Biscay west of the Île de Noirmoutier, Vendée (46°57′N 2°41′W) by SM UC-18 (Imperial German Navy). Her crew survived.
Marcus L. Crann	United States	The schooner was abandoned in the Atlantic Ocean. Three of her crew were rescued by Mar Del Norte (Spain).
Russian	United Kingdom	World War I: The cargo ship was torpedoed and sunk in the Mediterranean Sea 210 nautical miles (390 km) east by south of Malta (35°30′N 18°52′E) by SM UB-43 (Imperial German Navy) with the loss of 28 crew.
Westminster	United Kingdom	World War I: The cargo ship was torpedoed and sunk in the Mediterranean Sea 196 nautical miles (363 km) east by south of Malta (35°35′N 18°23′E) by SM UB-43 (Imperial German Navy with the loss of fifteen of her crew.

== 15 December ==
List of shipwrecks: 15 December 1916
Ship	State	Description
Amodeo	Italy	The barque was wrecked at Toulon, Var, France. Her crew were rescued.
Cecelia	Italy	The barque was wrecked at Toulon with some loss of life.
Constance Mary	United Kingdom	World War I: The schooner was scuttled in the English Channel 20 nautical miles (37 km) north east of Cape Barfleur, Seine-Inférieure, France by SM UC-17 (Imperial German Navy). Her crew survived.
Emmanuele Accame	Italy	World War I: The cargo ship was sunk in the Mediterranean Sea 3 nautical miles (5.6 km) off Cape Bengut, Algeria (37°02′N 3°58′E) by SM U-38 (Imperial German Navy).
Naiad	United Kingdom	World War I: The full-rigged ship was shelled and sunk in the Atlantic Ocean 25 nautical miles (46 km) south east by south of the Bishop Rock, Isles of Scilly (49°42′N 5°51′W) by SM UB-38 (Imperial German Navy). Her crew survived.
Powhatan	United States	Powhatan shortly after being brought to the surface Merchants' and Miners' Transportation Company ship collided with Telena (United Kingdom) and sank on Thimble Shoal in Chesapeake Bay. She was salvaged and rebuilt as Cuba.
Rogn	Norway	World War I: The cargo ship was sunk in the Bay of Biscay 18 nautical miles (33 km) off Groix, Morbihan, France by SM UC-18 (Imperial German Navy). Her crew survived.

== 16 December ==
List of shipwrecks: 16 December 1916
Ship	State	Description
Chassie Maersk	Denmark	World War I: The cargo ship was sunk in the Bay of Biscay south west of Brest, Finistère, France (47°05′N 7°49′W) by SM U-46 (Imperial German Navy). Her crew survived.
HMT Crathie	Royal Navy	The naval trawler was lost on this date.
English and Welsh Ground Lightship	United Kingdom	The lightship was run into by Welshman (United Kingdom) and sank. Her crew were rescued.
USS H-3	United States Navy	Salvage of USS H-3 The H-class submarine ran aground in fog at Samoa Beach, California near the entrance to Humboldt Bay. She was taken overland to Humboldt Bay by a lumber company in April 1917, repaired and returned to service.
Taki Maru	Japan	World War I: The cargo ship was sunk in the Bay of Biscay south west of Brest (47°03′N 7°35′W) by SM U-46 (Imperial German Navy). Her crew survived.

== 17 December ==
List of shipwrecks: 17 December 1916
Ship	State	Description
Alerte	France	World War I: The schooner was sunk in the English Channel 40 nautical miles (74 km) west of the Casquets, Channel Islands (49°42′N 3°25′W) by SM UC-17 (Imperial German Navy). Her crew survived.
Ason	Spain	World War I: The cargo ship was torpedoed and sunk in the Atlantic Ocean 27 nautical miles (50 km) west of the Bishop Rock, Isles of Scilly, United Kingdom (49°40′N 7°00′W) by SM UB-38 (Imperial German Navy).
Athole	United Kingdom	World War I: The trawler struck a mine and sank in the North Sea 8 nautical miles (15 km) east by south of Tod Head, Aberdeenshire.
Bayhall	United Kingdom	World War I: The cargo ship was scuttled in the Atlantic Ocean 90 nautical miles (170 km) north by east of Cape Ortegal by SM U-46 (Imperial German Navy). Her crew survived, but her captain was taken as a prisoner of war.
Cascais	Portugal	World War I: The coaster was torpedoed and sunk in the Bay of Biscay south west of the Île d'Oléron, Charente-Maritime, France (45°51′N 1°26′W) by SM UC-18 (Imperial German Navy).
Imaculée Conception	France	World War I: The three-masted schooner was scuttled in the Bay of Biscay off the La Coubre Lighthouse, Charente-Maritime (45°49′N 1°34′W) by SM UC-18 (Imperial German Navy).
Margaret	United Kingdom	World War I: The drifter struck a mine placed by SM UC-21 (Imperial German Navy) and sank in the English Channel off Rye, Sussex with the loss of six of her crew.
Michail Ontchoukoff	Denmark	World War I: The cargo ship struck a mine and sank in the North Sea north by east of the Sunk Lightship (United Kingdom) (51°50′45″N 1°37′30″E). Her crew survived.
Niord	Sweden	World War I: The wooden barquentine, en route from Christiania to West Hartlepool, was burnt and sunk in the North Sea by SM U-83 (Imperial German Navy. Her crew survived.
Numancia	Spanish Navy	Numancia The decommissioned coastal defense ship, a former armoured frigate, struck rocks off the Setúbal District near Sesimbra, Portugal, and was wrecked during a gale while under tow from San Fernando, Spain, to Bilbao, Spain, for scrapping. Her wreck was partially scrapped in situ, and the remainder of it was abandoned in 5 to 6 metres (16 to 20 ft) of water.
Pascal	United Kingdom	World War I: The cargo ship was torpedoed and sunk in the English Channel 12 nautical miles (22 km) north of the Casquets (49°55′N 2°27′W) by SM U-70 (Imperial German Navy with the loss of two of her crew. Her captain was taken as a prisoner of war.
Prima	Norway	World War I: The cargo ship was scuttled in the Bay of Biscay 10 nautical miles (19 km) off the La Coubre Lighthouse (45°50′N 1°31′W) by SM UC-18 (Imperial German Navy). Her crew survived.
Prosper Leon	France	World War I: The fishing vessel was scuttled in the Bay of Biscay off the Île d'Oléron (46°13′N 2°25′W) by SM UC-18 (Imperial German Navy).
Saint Yves	France	World War I: The three-masted schooner was scuttled in the Bay of Biscay off the La Coubre Lighthouse (45°49′N 1°34′W) by SM UC-18 (Imperial German Navy).
Sjofna	Norway	World War I: The coaster was sunk in the North Sea 130 nautical miles (240 km) off the Ryvingen Lighthouse, Lister og Mandal county, Norway (57°36′N 4°55′E) by SM U-71 (Imperial German Navy). Her crew survived.
Tripoli	Italy	World War I: The sailing vessel was sunk in the Mediterranean Sea south west of Cape Carbonara, Sardinia by SM U-38 (Imperial German Navy).

== 18 December ==
List of shipwrecks: 18 December 1916
Ship	State	Description
Arran	United Kingdom	World War I: The trawler was shelled and sunk in the North Sea 110 nautical miles (200 km) east of the Longstone Lighthouse, Northumberland (56°06′N 1°40′E) by SM UB-34 (Imperial German Navy). Her crew survived.
Buki	Russia	World War I: The cargo ship struck a mine and sank in the Baltic Sea off Naissaar, Estonia (59°34′N 24°25′E).
Dramatist	United Kingdom	World War I: The cargo ship was scuttled in the Atlantic Ocean 490 nautical miles (910 km) off Flores, Pernambuco, Brazil by SMS Möwe (Imperial German Navy). Her crew survived.
Eugene Gaston	France	World War I: The brig was scuttled in the Atlantic Ocean 15 nautical miles (28 km) north west of the Le Four Lighthouse, Ouessant, Finistère by SM U-70 (Imperial German Navy). Her crew survived.
Flimston	United Kingdom	World War I: The cargo ship was scuttled in the Atlantic Ocean 21 nautical miles (39 km) north by east of Ouessant (48°48′N 5°08′W) by SM U-70 (Imperial German Navy). Her crew survived, but two of them were taken as prisoners of war.
Herø	Norway	World War I: The cargo ship was sunk in the North Sea 100 nautical miles (190 km) west south west of Lindesnes, Lister og Mandal county, Norway (56°52′N 5°19′E) by SM U-71 (Imperial German Navy). Her crew survived.
Hirondelle	France	World War I: The sailing vessel was sunk in the Atlantic Ocean north east of the Le Four Lighthouse by SM U-70 (Imperial German Navy).
Maria Louis	France	World War I: The schooner was scuttled in the English Channel 35 nautical miles (65 km) north west of Île Vierge, Finistère (49°17′N 5°02′W) by SM UC-17 (Imperial German Navy). Her crew survived.
Opal	United Kingdom	World War I: The coaster was sunk in the Irish Sea off the Isle of Man by SM U-80 (Imperial German Navy) with the loss of twelve crew.
Quo Vadis	France	World War I: The sailing vessel was scuttled in the English Channel south of The Lizard, Cornwall, United Kingdom (49°38′N 5°08′W) by SM UC-17 (Imperial German Navy).
Sieka	Netherlands	World War I: The sailing vessel was sunk in the North Sea (56°43′N 4°35′E) by SM U-71 (Imperial German Navy). Her crew survived; they were rescued by SM U-71.
Vague	France	World War I: The schooner was scuttled in the English Channel 35 nautical miles (65 km) north of Île Vierge (49°11′N 4°52′W) by SM UC-17 (Imperial German Navy). Her crew survived.

== 19 December ==
List of shipwrecks: 19 December 1916
Ship	State	Description
Ansgar	Norway	World War I: The sailing vessel was sunk in the North Sea by SM UB-34 (Imperial German Navy). Her crew survived.
Falk	Norway	World War I: The coaster was sunk in the Atlantic Ocean 5 nautical miles (9.3 km) west of Cape Finisterre, Spain by SM U-46 (Imperial German Navy). Her crew survived.
Gerda	Germany	World War I: The depôt ship was scuttled on this date. A former Danish coaster, she was captured on 16 December in the Atlantic Ocean off Cape Finisterre (47°07′N 7°45′W) by SM U-46 (Imperial German Navy). Her crew survived.
Kornmo	Norway	World War I: The barque was sunk in the North Sea by SM UB-34 (Imperial German Navy). Her crew survived.
Liverpool	United Kingdom	World War I: The coaster struck a mine placed by SM U-80 (Imperial German Navy) and sank in the Irish Sea 11 nautical miles (20 km) south east by east of the Chicken Rock, Isle of Man (53°49′N 4°23′W) with the loss of three of her crew.
Nystrand	Norway	World War I: The cargo ship was sunk in the North Sea 170 nautical miles (310 km) south west of Lyngør, Nedenes county, Norway (56°47′N 6°08′E) by SM U-81 (Imperial German Navy). Her crew survived.
Ocean	France	World War I: The three-masted schooner was sunk in the Atlantic Ocean 40 nautical miles (74 km) west north west of Ouessant, Finistère by SM UB-38 (Imperial German Navy).
Sno	Norway	World War I: The cargo ship was sunk in the Mediterranean Sea 25 nautical miles (46 km) west of the Isla de Alborán, Spain by SM U-47 (Imperial German Navy). Her crew survived.

== 20 December ==
List of shipwrecks: 20 December 1916
Ship	State	Description
Eva	Denmark	World War I: The schooner was sunk in the North Sea 80 nautical miles (150 km) east north east of Hartlepool, County Durham, United Kingdom by SM UB-34 (Imperial German Navy). Her crew survived.
Hildawell	United Kingdom	World War I: The cargo ship struck a mine placed by SM UC-32 (Imperial German Navy) and sank in the North Sea off Sunderland, County Durham with the loss of 22 of her crew.
Itonus	United Kingdom	World War I: The cargo ship was torpedoed and sunk in the Mediterranean Sea 60 nautical miles (110 km) north west by west of Malta (36°12′N 13°16′E) by SM U-38 (Imperial German Navy) with the loss of five crew.
Mereddio	Sweden	World War I: The cargo ship was torpedoed and sunk in the North Sea (56°28′N 3°50′E) by SM UB-34 (Imperial German Navy). Her crew survived.
Otarie II	France	World War I: The trawler was shelled and sunk in the Bay of Biscay 24 nautical miles (44 km) west of La Coubre, Gironde by SM UC-17 (Imperial German Navy). Her crew survived.
Saint Antoine de Padoue	France	World War I: The trawler was sunk in the Bay of Biscay off Bordeaux, Gironde by SM UC-17 (Imperial German Navy).

== 21 December ==
List of shipwrecks: 21 December 1916
Ship	State	Description
HMS Hoste	Royal Navy	The Parker-class destroyer leader collided with the Admiralty M-class destroyer HMS Negro off the Orkney Islands. Both vessels sank, HMS Negro with the loss of all 80 crew.
Modig	Norway	World War I: The cargo ship struck a mine and sank in the North Sea 15 nautical miles (28 km) south south east of Flamborough Head, Yorkshire, United Kingdom (53°56′N 0°13′E). Her crew survived.
Murex	United Kingdom	World War I: The tanker was torpedoed and sunk in the Mediterranean Sea 94 nautical miles (174 km) off Port Said, Egypt (32°20′N 31°00′E) by SM U-73 (Imperial German Navy) with the loss of a crew member.
No. 12 and No. 16	Ottoman Navy	The No. 1-class motor gunboats were lost on this date.
Norseman	United Kingdom	The cargo ship struck the Maids Rocks, in the Irish Sea off Larne, County Antrim and sank. Her crew were rescued.
Skiftet	Russia	World War I: The ship struck a mine placed by SM UC-27 (Imperial German Navy) and sank in the Baltic Sea south of Åland, Finland (59°58′N 20°08′E) with the loss of 86 lives.
HMT St. Ives	Royal Navy	World War I: The naval trawler struck a mine placed by SM UC-17 (Imperial German Navy) and sank in the English Channel off St. Anthony Head, Cornwall (approximately 50°06′N 5°00′W) with the loss of eleven of her crew.

== 22 December ==
List of shipwrecks: 22 December 1916
Ship	State	Description
Amedée	France	World War I: The sailing vessel was sunk in the English Channel 35 nautical miles (65 km) north of the Triagoz Lighthouse, Finistère by SM UC-18 (Imperial German Navy).
Avanti	Italy	World War I: The cargo ship was sunk in the Bay of Biscay off the north coast of Spain by SM U-70 (Imperial German Navy) with the loss of all hands.
Dansborg	Denmark	World War I: The cargo ship was sunk in the English Channel (49°40′N 3°48′W) by SM UC-18 (Imperial German Navy). Her crew survived.
HMS E30	Royal Navy	World War I: The E-class submarine struck a mine and sank in the North Sea off Orford Ness, Suffolk with the loss of all 30 crew.
Hroptatyr	Denmark	World War I: The cargo ship was sunk in the English Channel 25 nautical miles (46 km) west north west of Guernsey, Channel Islands (49°37′N 3°00′W) by SM UC-18 (Imperial German Navy) with the loss of two of her crew.

== 23 December ==
List of shipwrecks: 23 December 1916
Ship	State	Description
Burgermeister Pauli	Imperial German Navy	The Greta-class Vorpostenboot was wrecked on Hohes Riff. Salvaged, repaired and returned to service.
Frigga	Sweden	World War I: The cargo ship, en route from Rauma, Finland to Stockholm, struck a mine and sunk in the Baltic Sea off the Valkyakari lightship. One crew member was killed in the explosion.
Marques di Urquijo	Spain	World War I: The cargo ship was sunk in the Bay of Biscay 50 nautical miles (93 km) north of Bilbao, Biscay (44°12′N 3°31′W) by SM U-46 (Imperial German Navy). Her crew survived.
Thistleban	United Kingdom	World War I: The cargo ship struck a mine and was damaged in the Mediterranean Sea 5 nautical miles (9.3 km) north north west of Alexandria, Egypt. She was beached but was declared a total loss.
William Middleton	United Kingdom	World War I: The cargo ship was damaged in the Bristol Channel 4 nautical miles (7.4 km) north north west of Lundy Island, Devon by SM UC-45 (Imperial German Navy). She was beached, but was later repaired and returned to service.

== 24 December ==
List of shipwrecks: 24 December 1916
Ship	State	Description
HMT Abelard	Royal Navy	World War I: The naval trawler sank at Plymouth, Devon, possibly through striking a mine. Salvage efforts were abandoned on 11 January 1917.
Bargany	United Kingdom	World War I: The coaster was shelled and sunk in the English Channel 25 nautical miles (46 km) north of Ouessant, Finistère, France (48°52′N 5°19′W) by SM UC-17 (Imperial German Navy). Her crew survived.
Harry W. Adams	United Kingdom	World War I: The schooner was shelled and sunk in the Atlantic Ocean 46 nautical miles (85 km) north west by west of Cape Villano, Spain by SM U-70 (Imperial German Navy). Her crew survived.

== 25 December ==
List of shipwrecks: 25 December 1916
Ship	State	Description
Boavista	Denmark	The barque was wrecked at Boa Vista, Cape Verde Islands with the loss of a crew member.
Courlis	France	World War I: The schooner was sunk in the English Channel 25 nautical miles (46 km) north east of the Île Vierge Lighthouse, Finistère by SM UC-17 (Imperial German Navy).
Hiram	Russia	The barquentine was driven ashore on Nevis and was wrecked.
Marie Pierre	France	World War I: The schooner was set afire and sunk in the Bay of Biscay (44°42′N 3°10′W) by SM U-46 (Imperial German Navy). Her crew survived.

== 26 December ==
List of shipwrecks: 26 December 1916
Ship	State	Description
Agnes	United Kingdom	World War I: The schooner was scuttled in the Irish Sea 15 nautical miles (28 km) south west by west of St. Ann's Head, Pembrokeshire by SM UC-46 (Imperial German Navy). Her crew survived.
Johan	Denmark	World War I: The barque was scuttled in the English Channel 22 nautical miles (41 km) north north west of the Casquets, Channel Islands by SM U-79 (Imperial German Navy). Her crew survived.
Maryland	United States	The steamer sank 150 or 300 miles (240 or 480 km) off New York on 26 December after leaving Philadelphia on 22 December. A message had been received that she was sinking at (39°0′N 67°00′W). SM U-53 (Imperial German Navy) claimed to have sunk her on 16 December, so was either a different vessel or was misdated by ten days. Lost with all 26 hands.
Neptune	Belgium	World War I: The trawler was sunk in the Irish Sea off the Smalls Lighthouse by SM UC-46 (Imperial German Navy). Her crew survived.
Saint Louis	France	World War I: The schooner struck a mine placed by SM UC-46 (Imperial German Navy) and sank in the Irish Sea 3.5 nautical miles (6.5 km) south of Mumbles Head, Glamorgan, United Kingdom (51°31′N 3°59′W) with the loss of three of her crew.
Spinaway	United Kingdom	World War I: The schooner was shelled and sunk in the Atlantic Ocean 42 nautical miles (78 km) north west of Cape Villano, Spain (43°06′N 10°03′W) by SM U-70 (Imperial German Navy). Her crew survived.

== 27 December ==
List of shipwrecks: 27 December 1916
Ship	State	Description
Aislaby	United Kingdom	World War I: The cargo ship was scuttled in the Bay of Biscay 10 nautical miles (19 km) off Estaca Point, Galicia, Spain by SM U-46 (Imperial German Navy). Her crew survived, but her captain was taken as a prisoner of war.
Copsewood	United Kingdom	World War I: The coaster was torpedoed and sunk in the Atlantic Ocean 34 nautical miles (63 km) south south west of The Lizard, Cornwall (49°19′N 5°49′W) by SM U-79 (Imperial German Navy). Her crew survived.
Gaulois	French Navy	A drawing of Gaulois sinking. World War I: The Charlemagne-class battleship was torpedoed and sunk in the Aegean Sea off Cape Maleas, Greece (36°15′N 23°42′E) by SM UB-47 (Imperial German Navy) with the loss of four of her 668 crew.
Goulfar	Germany	World War I: The depôt ship was scuttled on this day. Formerly a French trawler, she was captured on 24 December in the Bay of Biscay north of Spain (43°54′N 7°34′W) by SM U-46 (Imperial German Navy).
Ida	Norway	World War I: The cargo ship was sunk in the Atlantic Ocean 50 nautical miles (93 km) south of the Wolf Rock, Cornwall (48°56′N 5°50′W) by SM U-79 (Imperial German Navy). Her crew survived.
Maud	France	World War I: The schooner was sunk in the Atlantic Ocean off the coast of Portugal (42°07′N 10°32′W) by SM UC-34 (Imperial German Navy). Her crew survived.

== 28 December ==
List of shipwrecks: 28 December 1916
Ship	State	Description
Oronsay	United Kingdom	World War I: The cargo ship was torpedoed and sunk in the Mediterranean Sea 48 nautical miles (89 km) south east of Malta by SM UC-22 (Imperial German Navy). Her crew survived, but her captain was taken as a prisoner of war.
Pitho	United Kingdom	World War I: The brigantine was scuttled in the English Channel 30 nautical miles (56 km) south east of Start Point, Devon by SM UC-17 (Imperial German Navy). Her crew survived.
Seedonis	Russia	World War I: The three-masted schooner was sunk in the Atlantic Ocean off Lisbon, Portugal (38°02′N 10°26′W) by SM UC-34 (Imperial German Navy).
Union	Norway	World War I: The sailing vessel was sunk in the English Channel by SM UC-17 (Imperial German Navy). Her crew survived.
317	French Navy	World War I: The torpedo boat struck a mine placed by SM UC-1 (Imperial German Navy) and sank in the English Channel off Calais with the loss of nine of her crew.

== 29 December ==
List of shipwrecks: 29 December 1916
Ship	State	Description
Alondra	United Kingdom	The passenger-cargo ship was wrecked on Kedge Rock off Baltimore, County Cork, Ireland. 16 crew took to the ships boat, but that too was wrecked, and all 16 perished. With a RNLI lifeboat yet to be placed at Baltimore, the Venerable Archdeacon John Richard Hedge Becher MA, the local RNLI Honorary Secretary, brought together a crew to attempt a rescue. In a joint effort lasting 2 days, involving his boat crew, the rocket brigade, and the crew of two Royal Navy trawlers, the remaining 23 survivors were rescued.
Fram	Norway	The steam fishing vessel was sunk in a collision with Osnes (Norway) while fishing near Tyrhaug Lighthouse.
Lena F. Oxner	Canada	The schooner foundered off Liverpool, Nova Scotia.
Lennox	United Kingdom	World War I: The steamship was wrecked on South Island off Wexford while trying to elude a pursuing U-boat. Crew evacuated before she broke up, a total loss.
Lonada	United Kingdom	World War I: The cargo ship struck a mine placed by SM UC-6 (Imperial German Navy) and sank in the North Sea 5 nautical miles (9.3 km) north by east of the Shipwash Lightship (United Kingdom) with the loss of six of her crew.
Obell	United Kingdom	The steamship was wrecked south west of the mouth of the Bashee River, Union of South Africa. She was on a voyage from Madagascar to an English port.
Tuskar	Russia	World War I: The cargo ship was sunk in the North Sea 60 nautical miles (110 km) east of Kirkwall, Orkney Islands, United Kingdom by SM U-48 (Imperial German Navy). Her crew survived.
HMS Ludlow	Royal Navy	World War I: The Racecourse-class minesweeper struck a mine placed by SM UC-6 (Imperial German Navy) and sank in the North Sea off the Shipwash Lightship (United Kingdom) (51°51′N 1°20′E) with the loss of six of her crew.
Yemassee	United States	The schooner barge sprung a leak and sank in Massachusetts Bay, a total loss.
Zoroaster	United Kingdom	World War I: The collier struck a mine placed by SM UC-11 (Imperial German Navy) and sank in the North Sea 1.75 nautical miles (3.24 km) east north east of the Sunk Lightship (United Kingdom) (51°53′N 1°38′E) with the loss of three of her crew.

== 30 December ==
List of shipwrecks: 30 December 1916
Ship	State	Description
Apsleyhall	United Kingdom	World War I: The cargo ship was torpedoed and sunk in the Mediterranean Sea 28 nautical miles (52 km) west by north of Gozo, Malta by SM UC-22 (Imperial German Navy). Her crew survived, but her captain was taken as a prisoner of war.
Borre	Norway	World War I: The cargo ship was scuttled in the Atlantic Ocean 16 nautical miles (30 km) north east of Cape Finisterre, Spain (43°12′N 9°23′W) by SM U-70 (Imperial German Navy). Her crew survived.
Danmark	Denmark	World War I: The cargo ship was scuttled in the Bay of Biscay off Viveiro, Galicia, Spain (45°55′N 8°00′W) by SM U-79 (Imperial German Navy). Her crew survived.
Edda	Norway	World War I: The cargo ship was scuttled in the Atlantic Ocean 3.5 nautical miles (6.5 km) north west of Cape Finisterre (43°11′N 9°19′W) by SM U-70 (Imperial German Navy). Her crew survived.
Jean	United Kingdom	World War I: The sailing vessel was sunk in the Atlantic Ocean 60 nautical miles (110 km) east of the St Paul Rocks, Brazil by SMS Geier (Imperial German Navy).
HMT Relevo	Royal Navy	The naval trawler was wrecked in the Mediterranean Sea off El Arish, Egypt.
Sappho	Greece	World War I: The cargo ship was sunk in the English Channel 25 nautical miles (46 km) north of the Île Vierge, Finistère, France (48°45′N 4°40′W) by SM UC-46 (Imperial German Navy). Her crew survived.

== 31 December ==
List of shipwrecks: 31 December 1916
Ship	State	Description
Eva	Norway	World War I: The cargo ship was scuttled in the English Channel 10 nautical miles (19 km) south of The Lizard, Cornwall, United Kingdom (49°47′N 5°10′W) by SM UB-18 (Imperial German Navy). Her crew survived.
Flora	Norway	World War I: The cargo ship was sunk in the Atlantic Ocean 25 nautical miles (46 km) south west of the Wolf Rock, Cornwall by SM UB-18 (Imperial German Navy). Her crew survived.
Protector	United Kingdom	World War I: The pilot boat struck a mine placed by SM UC-31 (Imperial German Navy) and sank in the River Tyne with the loss of nineteen lives.
Venus	French Navy	World War I: The naval trawler struck a mine placed by SM UC-23 (Imperial German Navy) and sank in the Aegean Sea off Milos, Greece with the loss of nine of her crew.

== Unknown date ==
List of shipwrecks: Unknown date 1916
Ship	State	Description
Jessie Costa	United States	The fishing schooner sailed from Boston on 13 December to St. John's, Newfoundland to be deliver to her new owners and vanished. Lost with all seven hands.
Orleanian	United States	The steamer left New York City for Malta on 23 December 1915 or 1916, and probably sank in a storm on 26 December. Lost with all 36 hands.
