= U19 =

U19 or U-19 may refer to:

- German submarine U-19, various vessels
- Stellated truncated hexahedron
- Stinson U-19 Sentinel, an American utility aircraft
- U-19, an experimental self-propelled gun based on the KV-1 tank
- Under 19, a sports team in the youth system
