= SS Magellan (1897) =

French passenger ship (1897–1916)

History

France
- Name: (France) Indus (1897-1903); (France) Magellan (1904-1916)
- Namesake: Ferdinand Magellan
- Owner: Messageries Maritimes
- Port of registry: France, Paris
- Route: Marseille - Singapore - Saigon - Shanghai - Yokohama (1898-1903 & 1912-1916); Bordeaux - Buenos Aires (1903-1912)
- Builder: Messageries Maritimes, La Ciotat
- Yard number: 109
- Launched: 29 August 1898
- Completed: 1898
- Acquired: 1898
- Maiden voyage: 27 March 1898
- In service: 27 March 1898
- Out of service: 11 December 1916
- Identification: Official number: 5600971
- Fate: Torpedoed and sunk on 11 December 1916

General characteristics
- Type: Passenger ship
- Tonnage: 6,027 GRT
- Length: 141.9 m (465 ft 7 in)
- Beam: 15.5 m (50 ft 10 in)
- Depth: 11 m (36 ft 1 in)
- Installed power: Two 3 cyl. triple expansion steam engine
- Propulsion: 2 screw propellers
- Speed: 19 knots (35 km/h; 22 mph)
- Capacity: 736 passengers
- Notes: 2 masts and 2 funnels

SS Magellan was a French passenger ship that was torpedoed and sunk by the German submarine SM U-63 10 nautical miles (19 km) south of Pantelleria in the Mediterranean Sea on 11 December 1916 with the loss of 36 lives, while she was travelling from Shanghai, China to Marseille, France.

== Construction ==
Magellan was built as Indus at the Messageries Maritimes shipyard in La Ciotat, France in 1897, and launched on 29 August 1898 before being completed that same year. The ship was 141.9 metres (465 ft 7 in) long, had a beam of 15.5 metres (50 ft 10 in) and a depth of 11 metres (36 ft 1 in). She was assessed at 6,027 gross register tons (GRT) and had two 3-cylinder triple expansion steam engine producing 9,500 nhp, driving two screw propellers. The ship could reach a maximum speed of 19 knots (35 km/h; 22 mph) and possessed two masts and two funnels. As built, she had the capacity to carry 736 passengers.

== Career and loss ==
Indus entered service on 27 March 1898, sailing the Marseille to Yokohama route via Singapore, Saigon and Shanghai. The ship was renamed Magellan and transferred to the Bordeaux to Buenos Aires route in 1903 before returning to her original route in 1912. When the First World War broke out in August 1914, Magellan was requisitioned to assure the postal service on her route to the Far East. In March and April 1915, Magellan took part in the Gallipoli campaign as a troopship.

In December 1916, Magellan was travelling in a convoy from Shanghai to Marseille while carrying 736 troops bound for the Western Front. Among the ships in the convoy were the French troopship Amiral Mogan, the French destroyer Sabre and HMS Cyclamen. On 11 December at 7.30 am, Magellan was struck by two torpedoes from the German submarine SM U-63 10 nautical miles (19 km) south of Pantelleria, killing 23 troops and 10 crew and sinking the ship within two hours. While the cargo ship SS Sinai and the French destroyer Sagaie were rescuing the Magellan survivors, SM U-63 torpedoed Sinai, sinking the ship in six hours without further loss of life. All survivors were landed at Malta, where a further three soldiers from Magellan succumbed to their injuries and were buried at the Bighi cemetery, bringing the total death toll to 36. The Magellan survivors were picked up by another ship and brought to Marseille at the end of December 1916.

== Wreck ==
The wreck of Magellan lies at (36°36′N 12°10′E). The current condition of the wreck is unknown.
