= SM UB-29 =

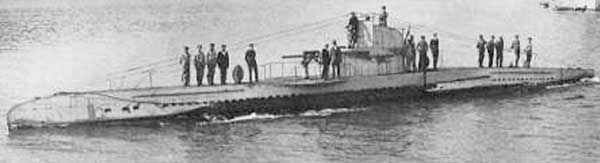
- SM UB-45, a U-boat similar to UB-29

History

German Empire
- Name: UB-29
- Ordered: 30 April 1915
- Builder: AG Weser, Bremen
- Cost: 1,291,000 German Papiermark
- Yard number: 243
- Laid down: 15 July 1915
- Launched: 31 December 1915
- Commissioned: 18 January 1916
- Fate: Sunk on 13 December 1916

General characteristics
- Class & type: Type UB II submarine
- Displacement: 265 t (261 long tons) surfaced; 291 t (286 long tons) submerged
- Length: 36.13 m (118 ft 6 in) o/a; 27.13 m (89 ft) pressure hull
- Beam: 4.36 m (14 ft 4 in) o/a; 3.85 m (13 ft) pressure hull
- Draught: 3.66 m (12 ft)
- Propulsion: 1 × propeller shaft; 2 × four-stroke 6-cylinder diesel engine, 284 PS (209 kW; 280 bhp); 2 × electric motor, 280 PS (210 kW; 280 shp)
- Speed: 9.15 knots (16.95 km/h; 10.53 mph) surfaced; 5.81 knots (10.76 km/h; 6.69 mph) submerged
- Range: 6,650 nautical miles (12,320 km; 7,650 mi) at 5 knots (9.3 km/h; 5.8 mph) surfaced; 45 nmi (83 km; 52 mi) at 5 knots (9.3 km/h; 5.8 mph) submerged
- Test depth: 50 m (160 ft)
- Complement: 2 officers, 21 men
- Armament: 2 × 50 cm (19.7 in) torpedo tubes; 4 × torpedoes (later 6); 1 × 5 cm SK L/40 gun
- Notes: 30-second diving time

Service record
- Part of: Training Flotilla; 8 March – 13 December 1916
- Commanders: Oblt.z.S. Herbert Pustkuchen; 18 January – 2 November 1916; Oblt.z.S. Erich Platsch; 3 November – 13 December 1916
- Operations: 17 patrols
- Victories: 36 merchant ships sunk (47,107 GRT); 2 merchant ships damaged (3,713 GRT); 1 warship damaged (3,750 tons); 2 merchant ships taken as prize (2,170 GRT)

SM UB-29 was a German Type UB II submarine or U-boat in the German Imperial Navy (German: Kaiserliche Marine) during World War I. The U-boat was ordered on 30 April 1915 and launched on 31 December 1915. She was commissioned into the German Imperial Navy on 18 January 1916 as SM UB-29. (Note: "SM" stands for "Seiner Majestät" (English: His Majesty's) and combined with the U for Unterseeboot would be translated as His Majesty's Submarine.)

The submarine sank 36 ships in 17 patrols for a total of 47,107 gross register tons (GRT). UB-29 was supposedly sunk by two depth charges from HMS Landrail south of Goodwin Sands at 51°9′N 1°46′E on 13 December 1916 , although the location of its wreck discovered in Belgian waters, approximately 15 nm NW of Ostend, contradicts this claim. The Landrail might have mistaken UB-29 for another boat, possibly the UC-19.

The UB-29's wreckage – exceptionally well preserved and with the hull still intact – was found by Belgian divers in the summer of 2017, and formally identified in November 2017. Its exact location was not published, in order to enable further research and protection of the site.

== Design ==
A Type UB II submarine, UB-29 had a displacement of 265 tonnes (261 long tons) when at the surface and 291 tonnes (286 long tons) while submerged. She had a total length of 36.13 m (118 ft 6 in), a beam of 4.36 m (14 ft 4 in), and a draught of 3.66 m (12 ft). The submarine was powered by two Benz six-cylinder diesel engines producing a total 267 metric horsepower (263 shp; 196 kW), two Siemens-Schuckert electric motors producing 280 metric horsepower (210 kW; 280 shp), and one propeller shaft. She was capable of operating at depths of up to 50 metres (160 ft).

The submarine had a maximum surface speed of 9.15 knots (16.95 km/h; 10.53 mph) and a maximum submerged speed of 5.81 knots (10.76 km/h; 6.69 mph). When submerged, she could operate for 45 nautical miles (83 km; 52 mi) at 5 knots (9.3 km/h; 5.8 mph); when surfaced, she could travel 6,650 nautical miles (12,320 km; 7,650 mi) at 5 knots (9.3 km/h; 5.8 mph). UB-29 was fitted with two 50 centimetres (20 in) torpedo tubes, four torpedoes, and one 5 cm (2.0 in) SK L/40 deck gun. She had a complement of twenty-one crew members and two officers and a thirty-second dive time.

== Summary of raiding history ==
Date	Name	Nationality	Tonnage (Note: Merchant ship tonnages are in gross register tons. Military vessels are listed by tons displacement.)	Fate
19 March 1916	Nominoe	France	3,155	Sunk
20 March 1916	Langeli	Norway	1,565	Sunk
20 March 1916	Skodsborg	Denmark	1,697	Sunk
24 March 1916	Salybia	United Kingdom	3,352	Sunk
24 March 1916	Sussex	France	1,353	Damaged
6 April 1916	Vesuvio	United Kingdom	1,391	Sunk
6 April 1916	Asger Ryg	Denmark	1,134	Sunk
7 April 1916	Braunton	United Kingdom	4,575	Sunk
7 April 1916	Marguerite	France	42	Sunk
25 April 1916	Berkelstroom	Netherlands	736	Sunk
25 April 1916	HMS Penelope	Royal Navy	3,750	Damaged
17 May 1916	Boy Percy	United Kingdom	46	Sunk
17 May 1916	Boy Sam	United Kingdom	46	Sunk
17 May 1916	Wanderer	United Kingdom	47	Sunk
6 August 1916	Loch Lomond	United Kingdom	42	Sunk
3 September 1916	Gotthard	Norway	1,636	Sunk
3 September 1916	Notre Dame De Lourdes	France	161	Sunk
5 September 1916	Jeanne	Denmark	1,191	Sunk
6 September 1916	Torridge	United Kingdom	5,036	Sunk
6 September 1916	Yvonne	France	104	Sunk
7 September 1916	Alice	France	119	Sunk
9 September 1916	Consolation	United Kingdom	47	Sunk
9 September 1916	Dorado	United Kingdom	36	Sunk
9 September 1916	Favourite	United Kingdom	38	Sunk
9 September 1916	Muriel Franklin	United Kingdom	29	Sunk
21 October 1916	Fart 3	Norway	230	Sunk
21 October 1916	Grit	United Kingdom	147	Sunk
21 October 1916	Princess May	United Kingdom	104	Sunk
22 October 1916	Georges M. Embiricos	Greece	3,636	Sunk
24 October 1916	Anna Gurine	Norway	1,147	Sunk
24 October 1916	Sidmouth	United Kingdom	4,045	Sunk
28 October 1916	Saint Charles	France	521	Sunk
12 November 1916	Batavier VI	Netherlands	1,085	Captured as prize
15 November 1916	Midsland	Netherlands	1,085	Captured as prize
1 December 1916	Bossi	Norway	1,462	Sunk
1 December 1916	Briardene	United Kingdom	2,701	Sunk
2 December 1916	Hitterøy	Norway	1,985	Sunk
6 December 1916	Ans	Russian Empire	362	Sunk
6 December 1916	Marie	Denmark	325	Sunk
7 December 1916	Keltier	Belgium	2,360	Damaged
7 December 1916	Meteor	Norway	4,217	Sunk

== Wreckage ==
The well preserved wreckage of the submarine was discovered in 2017 off the coast of Ostend. Hence, the assumption that it was sunk south of Goodwin Sands after a collision with HMS Landrail cannot be maintained. One possible explanation is that UB-29 escaped after the collision, and ran into a mine in Belgian waters. Another explanation is that HMS Landrail sank another U-boat, possibly the UC-19. The German government decided to leave the 22 crew members in the wreckage. Only some minor artefacts lying outside the submarine will be salvaged for an exposition in Belgium and will later be handed to the Internationales Maritimes Museum Hamburg.

== Bibliography ==
- Bendert, Harald (2000). Die UB-Boote der Kaiserlichen Marine, 1914-1918. Einsätze, Erfolge, Schicksal (in German). Hamburg: Verlag E.S. Mittler & Sohn GmbH. ISBN 3-8132-0713-7.
- Gröner, Erich; Jung, Dieter; Maass, Martin (1991). U-boats and Mine Warfare Vessels. German Warships 1815–1945. Vol. 2. Translated by Thomas, Keith; Magowan, Rachel. London: Conway Maritime Press. ISBN 0-85177-593-4.
- Rössler, Eberhard (1979). Die deutschen U-Boote und ihre Werften: eine Bilddokumentation über den deutschen U-Bootbau; in zwei Bänden (in German). Vol. I. Munich: Bernard & Graefe. ISBN 3-7637-5213-7.
