= SM U-46 =

German and Japanese submarine

History

German Empire
- Name: U-46
- Ordered: 4 August 1914
- Builder: Kaiserliche Werft, Danzig
- Yard number: 24
- Launched: 18 May 1915
- Commissioned: 17 December 1915
- Fate: Surrendered to Japan 26 November 1918

Japanese Empire
- Name: O-2
- Acquired: 26 November 1918
- Commissioned: 1920
- Decommissioned: 1921
- Fate: Possibly scrapped 1922; Possibly foundered on 21 April 1925 or; Scuttled on or after 5 August 1927

General characteristics
- Class & type: Type U-43 submarine
- Displacement: 725 t (714 long tons) surfaced; 940 t (930 long tons) submerged
- Length: 65.00 m (213 ft 3 in) (o/a)
- Beam: 6.20 m (20 ft 4 in) (oa); 4.18 m (13 ft 9 in) (pressure hull)
- Height: 9.00 m (29 ft 6 in)
- Draught: 3.74 m (12 ft 3 in)
- Installed power: 2 × 2,000 PS (1,471 kW; 1,973 shp) surfaced; 2 × 1,200 PS (883 kW; 1,184 shp) submerged
- Propulsion: 2 shafts
- Speed: 15.2 knots (28.2 km/h; 17.5 mph) surfaced; 9.7 knots (18.0 km/h; 11.2 mph) submerged
- Range: 11,400 nmi (21,100 km; 13,100 mi) at 8 knots (15 km/h; 9.2 mph) surfaced; 51 nmi (94 km; 59 mi) at 5 knots (9.3 km/h; 5.8 mph) submerged
- Test depth: 50 m (164 ft 1 in)
- Complement: 36
- Armament: 6 × torpedo tubes (four bow, two stern); 8 torpedoes; 1 × 8.8 cm (3.5 in) SK L/30 deck gun

Service record
- Part of: III Flotilla; 29 March 1916 – 11 November 1918
- Commanders: Kptlt. Leo Hillebrand; 17 December 1915 - 6 December 1917; Kptlt. Alfred Saalwächter; 7 December 1916 – 15 January 1917; Kptlt. Leo Hillebrand; 16 January – 11 November 1918
- Operations: 11 patrols
- Victories: 51 merchant ships sunk (138,942 GRT); 1 auxiliary warship sunk (1,372 GRT); 1 merchant ship damaged (7,378 GRT)

SM U-46 was one of the 329 submarines serving in the Imperial German Navy in World War I. U-46 was engaged in the combat during World War I and took part in the First Battle of the Atlantic. After the war, she served in the Imperial Japanese Navy as O-2.

== Imperial German Navy ==
Ordered on 4 August 1914, U-46 was constructed at the Kaiserliche Werft in Danzig, Germany. Launched on 18 May 1915, she was commissioned on 17 December 1915.

Assigned to the III Flotilla, U-46 began her first war patrol on 29 March 1916. Remaining in the III Flotilla for the rest of the war, she conducted a total of 11 war patrols before the war ended on 11 November 1918 and was credited with sinking 51 merchant ships totaling 138,942 gross register tons and one auxiliary warship of 1,372 gross register tons and damaging one merchant ship of 7,378 gross register tons.

After the end of the war, she surrendered to Japan on 26 November 1918.

=== Summary of raiding history ===
Date	Name	Nationality	Tonnage (Note: Merchant ship tonnages are in gross register tons. Military vessels are listed by tons displacement.)	Fate
29 September 1916	Ravn	Norway	1,260	Sunk
29 September 1916	Sinsen	Norway	1,925	Sunk
30 September 1916	Hafnia	Norway	962	Sunk
30 September 1916	Hekla	Norway	950	Sunk
4 October 1916	Brantingham	United Kingdom	2,617	Sunk
6 October 1916	Erika	Russian Empire	2,430	Sunk
9 October 1916	Astoria	United Kingdom	4,262	Sunk
11 October 1916	Iolo	United Kingdom	3,903	Sunk
16 December 1916	Chassie Maersk	Denmark	1,387	Sunk
16 December 1916	Taki Maru	Japan	3,208	Sunk
16 December 1916	Gerda	Denmark	775	Sunk
17 December 1916	Bayhall	United Kingdom	3,898	Sunk
19 December 1916	Falk	Norway	948	Sunk
23 December 1916	Marques De Urquijo	Spain	2,170	Sunk
25 December 1916	Marie Pierre	France	166	Sunk
27 December 1916	Aislaby	United Kingdom	2,692	Sunk
27 December 1916	Goulfar	France	259	Sunk
21 March 1917	Hindustan	United Kingdom	3,692	Sunk
23 March 1917	Argo	Portugal	1,563	Sunk
24 March 1917	Montreal	France	3,342	Sunk
1 April 1917	Aztec	United States	3,727	Sunk
3 April 1917	Hesperus	Russian Empire	2,231	Sunk
5 April 1917	Benheather	United Kingdom	4,701	Sunk
7 April 1917	Fiskaa	Norway	1,700	Sunk
15 May 1917	Grosholm	Norway	1,847	Sunk
17 May 1917	Lewisham	United Kingdom	2,810	Sunk
18 May 1917	Llandrindod	United Kingdom	3,841	Sunk
18 May 1917	Penhale	United Kingdom	3,712	Sunk
20 May 1917	HMS Paxton	Royal Navy	1,372	Sunk
22 May 1917	Tansan Maru	Japan	2,443	Sunk
24 May 1917	Jersey City	United Kingdom	4,670	Sunk
24 July 1917	Brumaire	United Kingdom	2,324	Sunk
24 July 1917	Zermatt	United Kingdom	3,767	Sunk
25 July 1917	Peninsula	United Kingdom	1,384	Sunk
25 July 1917	Purley	United Kingdom	4,500	Sunk
27 July 1917	Begona No. 4	United Kingdom	2,407	Sunk
31 July 1917	Shimosa	United Kingdom	4,221	Sunk
22 October 1917	Zillah	United Kingdom	3,788	Sunk
24 October 1917	Ilderton	United Kingdom	3,125	Sunk
28 October 1917	Baron Balfour	United Kingdom	3,991	Sunk
4 November 1917	Irina	Russian Empire	2,210	Sunk
7 November 1917	Obj	Norway	1,829	Sunk
27 January 1918	Andania	United Kingdom	13,405	Sunk
31 January 1918	Towneley	United Kingdom	2,476	Sunk
1 February 1918	Cavallo	United Kingdom	2,086	Sunk
3 February 1918	Lutece	France	1,346	Sunk
5 February 1918	Cresswell	United Kingdom	2,829	Sunk
13 March 1918	Crayford	United Kingdom	1,209	Sunk
18 March 1918	Atlantic Sun	United States	2,333	Sunk
30 March 1918	Stabil	Norway	538	Sunk
25 May 1918	Rathlin Head	United Kingdom	7,378	Damaged
16 September 1918	Tasman	United Kingdom	5,023	Sunk
25 September 1918	Gloire a Jesus	France	60	Sunk

== Imperial Japanese Navy ==
Transferred to Japan after surrendering, the submarine was commissioned into the Imperial Japanese Navy in 1920 as O-2. Decommissioned in 1921, she was partly dismantled at the Kure Naval Arsenal in April 1921.

A photo of U-46 apparently at the time of transfer to Japan shows the submarine docked and flying the flag of the Imperial Japanese Navy over the flag of the Imperial German Navy.

Some sources claim that O-2 was scrapped in 1922. Other sources claim that in 1925, O-2 was rebuilt at Yokosuka Naval Arsenal to serve as a testbed for submarine salvage operations by the submarine salvage ship Asahi and foundered in the Pacific Ocean in a storm off the coast of Japan during her transfer voyage from Yokosuka to Kure on 21 April 1925, adding that an American merchant ship sighted her derelict hulk floating in the Pacific west of Oahu, Hawaii, on 5 August 1927, and that the hulk subsequently was scuttled.

== Bibliography ==
- Gardiner, Robert (1985). Conway's All the World's Fighting Ships 1906-1921. Annapolis, Maryland: Naval Institute Press. ISBN 0-87021-907-3.
- Gröner, Erich; Jung, Dieter; Maass, Martin (1991). U-boats and Mine Warfare Vessels. German Warships 1815–1945. Vol. 2. Translated by Thomas, Keith; Magowan, Rachel. London: Conway Maritime Press. ISBN 0-85177-593-4.
- Rössler, Eberhard (1981). The U-boat : the evolution and technical history of German submarines. London: Cassell. ISBN 0304361208.
