= SM UC-11 =

German Type UC I minelayer submarine or U-boat

History

German Empire
- Name: UC-11
- Ordered: 23 November 1914
- Builder: AG Weser, Bremen
- Yard number: 225
- Laid down: 26 January 1915
- Launched: 11 April 1915
- Commissioned: 23 April 1915
- Fate: Sunk by mine, 26 June 1918

General characteristics
- Class & type: Type UC I submarine
- Displacement: 168 t (165 long tons), surfaced; 182 t (179 long tons), submerged
- Length: 33.99 m (111 ft 6 in) o/a; 29.62 m (97 ft 2 in) pressure hull
- Beam: 3.15 m (10 ft 4 in)
- Draft: 3.06 m (10 ft 0 in)
- Propulsion: 1 × propeller shaft; 1 × 6-cylinder, 4-stroke diesel engine, 80 PS (59 kW; 79 bhp); 1 × electric motor, 175 PS (129 kW; 173 shp)
- Speed: 6.49 knots (12.02 km/h; 7.47 mph), surfaced; 5.67 knots (10.50 km/h; 6.52 mph), submerged
- Range: 910 nmi (1,690 km; 1,050 mi) at 5 knots (9.3 km/h; 5.8 mph) surfaced; 50 nmi (93 km; 58 mi) at 4 knots (7.4 km/h; 4.6 mph) submerged
- Test depth: 50 m (160 ft)
- Complement: 14
- Armament: 6 × 100 cm (39 in) mine tubes; 12 × UC 120 mines; 1 × 8 mm (0.31 in) machine gun

Service record
- Part of: Flandern Flotilla; 26 May – 17 October 1915; Training Flotilla; 17 October 1915 – 11 August 1916; Flandern / Flandern I Flotilla; 11 August 1916 – 26 June 1918
- Commanders: Oblt.z.S. Walter Gottfried Schmidt; 23 April 1915 – 11 August 1916; Oblt.z.S. Reinhold Saltzwedel; 12 – 20 August 1916; Oblt.z.S. Max Schmitz; 21 August – 1 December 1916; Oblt.z.S. Benno von Ditfurth; 2 December 1916 – 29 June 1917; Oblt.z.S. Georg Niemeyer; 30 June – 19 July 1917; Oblt.z.S. Benno von Ditfurth; 20 July – 5 August 1917; Oblt.z.S. Karl Dobberstein; 6 August – 16 November 1917; Oblt.z.S. Ferdinand Schwartz; 17 November 1917 – 10 February 1918; Oblt.z.S. Reinhold Thomsen; 11 February – 4 April 1918; Oblt.z.S. Werner Lange; 5 April – 16 June 1918; Oblt.z.S. Kurt Utke; 17 – 26 June 1918
- Operations: 83 patrols
- Victories: 17 merchant ships sunk (31,560 GRT); 2 warships sunk (510 tons); 8 auxiliary warships sunk (1,638 GRT); 2 warships damaged (5,084 tons); 1 auxiliary warship damaged (378 GRT)

SM UC-11 was a German Type UC I minelayer submarine or U-boat in the German Imperial Navy (German: Kaiserliche Marine) during World War I. The U-boat was ordered on 23 November 1914, laid down on 26 January 1915, and was launched on 11 April 1915. She was commissioned into the German Imperial Navy on 23 April 1915 as SM UC-11. (Note: "SM" stands for "Seiner Majestät" (English: His Majesty's) and combined with the U for Unterseeboot would be translated as His Majesty's Submarine.) Mines laid by UC-11 in her 83 patrols were credited with sinking 27 ships. UC-11 was mined and sunk on 26 June 1918. A crew member was Rudolf Finkler from Oberlinxweiler, Kreis St. Wendel, Germany. According to his death record the boat went down in the North Sea near Harwich, abt. 2.5 nautical miles (4.6 km; 2.9 mi) north east of Funk Feuerschiff on position 51°55′N 1°41′E.

== Design ==
A Type UC I submarine, UC-11 had a displacement of 168 tonnes (165 long tons) when at the surface and 182 tonnes (179 long tons) while submerged. She had a length overall of 33.99 m (111 ft 6 in), a beam of 3.15 m (10 ft 4 in), and a draught of 3.06 m (10 ft). The submarine was powered by one Benz six-cylinder, four-stroke diesel engine producing 80 metric horsepower (59 kW; 79 shp), an electric motor producing 175 metric horsepower (129 kW; 173 shp), and one propeller shaft. She was capable of operating at depths of up to 50 metres (160 ft).

The submarine had a maximum surface speed of 6.20 knots (11.48 km/h; 7.13 mph) and a maximum submerged speed of 5.22 knots (9.67 km/h; 6.01 mph). When submerged, she could operate for 50 nautical miles (93 km; 58 mi) at 4 knots (7.4 km/h; 4.6 mph); when surfaced, she could travel 910 nautical miles (1,690 km; 1,050 mi) at 5 knots (9.3 km/h; 5.8 mph). UC-11 was fitted with six 100 centimetres (39 in) mine tubes, twelve UC 120 mines, and one 8 millimetres (0.31 in) machine gun. She was built by AG Weser Bremen and her complement was fourteen crew members.

== Summary of raiding history ==
Date	Name	Nationality	Tonnage (Note: Merchant ship tonnages are in gross register tons. Military vessels are listed by tons displacement.)	Fate
1 June 1915	HMS Mohawk	Royal Navy	865	Damaged
9 June 1915	Erna Boldt	United Kingdom	1,731	Sunk
9 June 1915	Lady Salisbury	United Kingdom	1,446	Sunk
10 June 1915	HMS TB 10	Royal Navy	255	Sunk
10 June 1915	HMS TB 12	Royal Navy	255	Sunk
15 June 1915	Argyll	United Kingdom	280	Sunk
20 October 1916	Huguenot	United Kingdom	1,032	Sunk
24 October 1916	Framfield	United Kingdom	2,510	Sunk
26 October 1916	HMT Lord Roberts	Royal Navy	293	Sunk
21 November 1916	Helena	Netherlands	1,798	Sunk
29 November 1916	HMT Lord Airedale	Royal Navy	215	Sunk
9 December 1916	Forth	United Kingdom	1,159	Sunk
9 December 1916	Harlington	United Kingdom	1,089	Sunk
9 December 1916	Harlyn	United Kingdom	1,794	Sunk
17 December 1916	Michail Ontchoukoff	Denmark	2,118	Sunk
29 December 1916	Zoroaster	United Kingdom	3,803	Sunk
8 January 1917	HMD Cape Colony	Royal Navy	82	Sunk
2 February 1917	HMT Holdene	Royal Navy	274	Sunk
12 February 1917	Foreland	United Kingdom	1,960	Sunk
14 February 1917	Marie Leonhardt	United Kingdom	1,466	Sunk
26 April 1917	HMS Mercury	Royal Navy	378	Damaged
27 April 1917	HMT Agile	Royal Navy	246	Sunk
24 September 1917	HMD Hastfen	Royal Navy	77	Sunk
25 October 1917	Wearside	United Kingdom	3,560	Sunk
27 October 1917	HMT Strymon	Royal Navy	198	Sunk
24 November 1917	French Rose	United Kingdom	465	Sunk
25 November 1917	Ostpreussen	United Kingdom	1,779	Sunk
27 November 1917	Groeswen	United Kingdom	3,570	Sunk
16 January 1918	HMT John E. Lewis	Royal Navy	253	Sunk
13 June 1918	HMS Conquest	Royal Navy	4,219	Damaged
