= SS Solstad (1916) =

History

Norway
- Name: Solstad
- Owner: A. F. Klaveness
- Operator: A. F. Klaveness
- Builder: Sunderland Shipbuilding Company, Sunderland
- Yard number: 289
- Launched: 18 April 1916
- Commissioned: June 1916
- Maiden voyage: 15 June 1916
- Homeport: Kristiania
- Identification: Call sign MNQG
- Fate: Sunk, 5 April 1917

General characteristics
- Type: Cargo ship
- Tonnage: 4,147 GRT; 2,575 NRT; 7,000 DWT
- Length: 364 ft 0 in (110.95 m)
- Beam: 50 ft 8 in (15.44 m)
- Depth: 25 ft 5 in (7.75 m)
- Installed power: 336 Nhp
- Propulsion: North Eastern Marine Engineering Co 3-cylinder triple expansion
- Speed: 9.0 knots

Solstad was a steam cargo ship built in 1916 by the Sunderland Shipbuilding Company of Sunderland for A. F. Klaveness & Co of Kristiania. She was primarily employed as a collier doing tramp trade during her career. The freighter was sunk by a German submarine in April 1917 on one of her regular journeys.

== Design and construction ==
Solstad was laid down at Sunderland Ship Building Company's South Dock shipyard in Sunderland, launched on 18 April 1916 (yard number 289), and after successful completion of sea trials was delivered to her owner in June 1916. On 13 May 1916 a new company (Aktieselskapet Dampskibet "Solstad"), a subsidiary of A. F. Klaveness & Co, with NOK 87,000 starting capital was registered to operate the new vessel.

As built, the ship was 364 feet 0 inches (110.95 m) long (between perpendiculars) and 50 feet 8 inches (15.44 m) abeam, a mean draft of 25 feet 5 inches (7.75 m). Solstad was assessed at 4,147 GRT, 2,575 NRT and had deadweight of approximately 7,000. The vessel had a steel hull, and a single 336 nhp triple-expansion steam engine, with cylinders of 25-inch (64 cm), 42-inch (110 cm), and 68-inch (170 cm) diameter with a 45-inch (110 cm) stroke, that drove a single screw propeller, and moved the ship at up to 9.0 knots (10.4 mph; 16.7 km/h).

== Operational history ==
After delivery Solstad was immediately chartered to transport coal to Egypt and left Sunderland for her maiden voyage on 15 June 1916 for Alexandria. After discharging her load, the ship left for Baltimore on 24 July and reached there on 19 August. The vessel then loaded 5,693 tons of coal and left for Alexandria at the end of August. The vessel conducted one more trip from Baltimore carrying 5,689 tons of coal at the end of October arriving at Alexandria on 27 November.

After unloading the vessel continued on to Australia arriving there in January 1917. Solstad finished loading 78,685 sacks (approximately 6,497 tons) of wheat in Melbourne on 2 February and left the next day for Europe. The ship coaled at Fremantle on 14 February, Colombo on 6 March, touched off at Aden on 21 March 1917 before arriving at Port Said on 1 April around 09:10. After taking on 500 tons of coal the ship departed Port Said at approximately 17:30 and was directed by the British authorities to proceed to Livorno to discharge her cargo.

=== Sinking ===
On 5 April 1917, at around 12:00 noon, Solstad was in an approximate position 35°40′N 21°15′E and under command of Captain August Larsen. The weather was clear with a gentle breeze from the southeast. At 15:25 a white stripe was noticed in the water close to the vessel, and shortly after a torpedo hit the No. 2 hold on the port side. The ship immediately began to list to port, and an order was given to stop the engines. As the captain ordered the crew to abandon ship and lower the lifeboats, a submarine flying a German navy ensign but no identification, approached. The captain was interrogated, and was told his vessel was within the blockade zone. A boarding crew went aboard to retrieve food supplies, tools, maps and navigational instruments, etc. As the time passed by, the ship steadied herself and was still floating. With the exception of No. 2 hold, no other hold or room seemed to have any water present. At about 18:00 the submarine commander ordered Solstad's crew to abandon ship. Since the ship was not sinking, scuttling charges were placed on board and fired. As the charges exploded, the vessel began listing and slowly sunk bow first around 18:25. At the Captain Larsen's request the submarine took the lifeboats in tow at around 18:50 and pulled them towards Greece until 19:55. The crew then continued rowing towards Greece, and on 6 April at about 15:15 they managed to reach land near a small town of Marathos (Marathopoli) on the west coast of Greece. It was later discovered that the German submarine U-63 was responsible for the ship's sinking.
