= SM UC-46 =

German Type UC II minelaying U-boat

History

German Empire
- Name: UC-46
- Ordered: 20 November 1915
- Builder: AG Weser, Bremen
- Yard number: 256
- Laid down: 1 February 1916
- Launched: 8 August 1916
- Commissioned: 15 September 1916
- Fate: Sunk, 8 February 1917

General characteristics
- Class & type: Type UC II submarine
- Displacement: 420 t (410 long tons), surfaced; 502 t (494 long tons), submerged
- Length: 51.85 m (170 ft 1 in) o/a; 39.70 m (130 ft 3 in) pressure hull
- Beam: 5.22 m (17 ft 2 in) o/a; 3.65 m (12 ft) pressure hull
- Draught: 3.67 m (12 ft 0 in)
- Propulsion: 2 × propeller shafts; 2 × 6-cylinder, 4-stroke diesel engines, 600 PS (440 kW; 590 shp); 2 × electric motors, 460 PS (340 kW; 450 shp)
- Speed: 11.7 knots (21.7 km/h; 13.5 mph), surfaced; 6.74 knots (12.48 km/h; 7.76 mph), submerged
- Range: 7,280 nmi (13,480 km; 8,380 mi) at 7 knots (13 km/h; 8.1 mph) surfaced; 54 nmi (100 km; 62 mi) at 4 knots (7.4 km/h; 4.6 mph) submerged
- Test depth: 50 m (160 ft)
- Complement: 26
- Armament: 6 × 100 cm (39.4 in) mine tubes; 18 × UC 200 mines; 3 × 50 cm (19.7 in) torpedo tubes (2 bow/external; one stern); 7 × torpedoes; 1 × 8.8 cm (3.5 in) Uk L/30 deck gun
- Notes: 30-second diving time

Service record
- Part of: Flandern Flotilla; 29 November 1916 – 8 February 1917
- Commanders: Oblt.z.S. Friedrich Moecke; 15 September 1916 – 8 February 1917
- Operations: 4 patrols
- Victories: 9 merchant ships sunk (10,346 GRT); 1 auxiliary warship sunk (275 GRT); 3 merchant ships damaged (18,836 GRT)

SM UC-46 was a German Type UC II minelaying submarine or U-boat in the German Imperial Navy (German: Kaiserliche Marine) during World War I. The U-boat was ordered on 20 November 1915, laid down on 1 February 1916, and was launched on 8 August 1916. She was commissioned into the German Imperial Navy on 15 September 1916 as SM UC-46. (Note: "SM" stands for "Seiner Majestät" (English: His Majesty's) and combined with the U for Unterseeboot would be translated as His Majesty's Submarine.) In four patrols UC-46 was credited with sinking 10 ships, either by torpedo or by mines laid. UC-46 was rammed and sunk southeast of Goodwin Sands by the British destroyer HMS Liberty on 8 February 1917.

== Design ==
A Type UC II submarine, UC-46 had a displacement of 420 tonnes (410 long tons) when at the surface and 502 tonnes (494 long tons) while submerged. She had a length overall of 51.85 m (170 ft 1 in), a beam of 5.22 m (17 ft 2 in), and a draught of 3.68 m (12 ft 1 in). The submarine was powered by two six-cylinder four-stroke diesel engines each producing 300 metric horsepower (220 kW; 300 shp) (a total of 600 metric horsepower (440 kW; 590 shp)), two electric motors producing 460 metric horsepower (340 kW; 450 shp), and two propeller shafts. She had a dive time of 48 seconds and was capable of operating at a depth of 50 metres (160 ft).

The submarine had a maximum surface speed of 11.7 knots (21.7 km/h; 13.5 mph) and a submerged speed of 6.7 to 7.4 knots (12.4 to 13.7 km/h; 7.7 to 8.5 mph). When submerged, she could operate for 54 nautical miles (100 km; 62 mi) at 4 knots (7.4 km/h; 4.6 mph); when surfaced, she could travel 7,280 nautical miles (13,480 km; 8,380 mi) at 7 knots (13 km/h; 8.1 mph). UC-46 was fitted with six 100 centimetres (39 in) mine tubes, eighteen UC 200 mines, three 50 centimetres (20 in) torpedo tubes (one on the stern and two on the bow), seven torpedoes, and one 8.8 cm (3.5 in) Uk L/30 deck gun. Her complement was twenty-six crew members.

== Summary of raiding history ==
Date	Name	Nationality	Tonnage (Note: Merchant ship tonnages are in gross register tons. Military vessels are listed by tons displacement.)	Fate
21 December 1916	Modig	Norway	1,704	Sunk
23 December 1916	William Middleton	United Kingdom	2,543	Damaged
24 December 1916	Paul Paix	United Kingdom	4,196	Damaged
26 December 1916	Agnes	United Kingdom	99	Sunk
26 December 1916	Neptune	Belgium	199	Sunk
26 December 1916	Saint Louis	France	184	Sunk
30 December 1916	Sappho	Greece	2,087	Sunk
1 January 1917	Goosebridge	Sweden	1,886	Sunk
1 February 1917	Gamma	Netherlands	2,115	Sunk
2 February 1917	Isle of Arran	United Kingdom	1,918	Sunk
4 February 1917	Marthe	France	154	Sunk
5 February 1917	Argyllshire	United Kingdom	12,097	Damaged
6 February 1917	HMT Longset	Royal Navy	275	Sunk
