= SM UC-32 =

1915 German Type UC II minelaying U-boat

Coordinates: 54°55′N 1°20′E

History

German Empire
- Name: UC-32
- Ordered: 29 August 1915
- Builder: AG Vulcan, Hamburg
- Yard number: 71
- Launched: 12 August 1916
- Commissioned: 13 September 1916
- Fate: Sunk by own mine, 23 February 1917

General characteristics
- Class & type: Type UC II submarine
- Displacement: 400 t (390 long tons), surfaced; 480 t (470 long tons), submerged
- Length: 49.45 m (162 ft 3 in) o/a; 39.30 m (128 ft 11 in) pressure hull
- Beam: 5.22 m (17 ft 2 in) o/a; 3.65 m (12 ft) pressure hull
- Draught: 3.68 m (12 ft 1 in)
- Propulsion: 2 × propeller shafts; 2 × 6-cylinder, 4-stroke diesel engines, 500 PS (370 kW; 490 bhp); 2 × electric motors, 460 PS (340 kW; 450 shp)
- Speed: 11.6 knots (21.5 km/h; 13.3 mph), surfaced; 6.7 knots (12.4 km/h; 7.7 mph), submerged
- Range: 10,040 nmi (18,590 km; 11,550 mi) at 7 knots (13 km/h; 8.1 mph), surfaced; 53 nmi (98 km; 61 mi) at 4 knots (7.4 km/h; 4.6 mph), submerged
- Test depth: 50 m (160 ft)
- Complement: 26
- Armament: 6 × 100 cm (39.4 in) mine tubes; 18 × UC 200 mines; 3 × 50 cm (19.7 in) torpedo tubes (2 bow/external; one stern); 7 × torpedoes; 1 × 8.8 cm (3.5 in) Uk L/30 deck gun
- Notes: 48-second diving time

Service record
- Part of: I Flotilla; 27 November 1916 – 23 February 1917
- Commanders: Oblt.z.S. Herbert Breyer; 13 September 1916 – 23 February 1917
- Operations: 3 patrols
- Victories: 6 merchant ships sunk (9,083 GRT)

SM UC-32 (Note: "SM" stands for "Seiner Majestät" (English: His Majesty's) and combined with the U for Unterseeboot would be translated as His Majesty's Submarine.) was a German Type UC II minelaying submarine or U-boat in the German Imperial Navy (German: Kaiserliche Marine) during World War I. The U-boat was ordered on 29 August 1915 and was launched on 12 August 1916. She was commissioned into the German Imperial Navy on 13 September 1916 as SM UC-32. In three patrols UC-32 was credited with sinking six ships, either by torpedo or by mines laid. UC-32 was sunk by the detonation of one of her own mines on 23 February 1917.

== Design ==
A Type UC II submarine, UC-32 had a displacement of 400 tonnes (390 long tons) when at the surface and 480 tonnes (470 long tons) while submerged. She had a length overall of 49.45 m (162 ft 3 in), a beam of 5.22 m (17 ft 2 in), and a draught of 3.68 m (12 ft 1 in). The submarine was powered by two six-cylinder four-stroke diesel engines each producing 250 metric horsepower (180 kW; 250 shp) (a total of 500 metric horsepower (370 kW; 490 shp)), two electric motors producing 460 metric horsepower (340 kW; 450 shp), and two propeller shafts. She had a dive time of 48 seconds and was capable of operating at a depth of 50 metres (160 ft).

The submarine had a maximum surface speed of 11.6 knots (21.5 km/h; 13.3 mph) and a submerged speed of 6.6 knots (12.2 km/h; 7.6 mph). When submerged, she could operate for 53 nautical miles (98 km; 61 mi) at 4 knots (7.4 km/h; 4.6 mph); when surfaced, she could travel 10,040 nautical miles (18,590 km; 11,550 mi) at 7 knots (13 km/h; 8.1 mph). UC-32 was fitted with six 100 centimetres (39 in) mine tubes, eighteen UC 200 mines, three 50 centimetres (20 in) torpedo tubes (one on the stern and two on the bow), seven torpedoes, and one 8.8 cm (3.5 in) Uk L/30 deck gun. Her complement was twenty-six crew members.

== Summary of raiding history ==
Date	Name	Nationality	Tonnage (Note: Tonnages are in gross register tons)	Fate
14 December 1916	Burnhope	United Kingdom	1,941	Sunk
20 December 1916	Hildawell	United Kingdom	2,494	Sunk
29 January 1917	Edda	Sweden	536	Sunk
31 January 1917	Ida Duncan	United Kingdom	139	Sunk
1 February 1917	Jerv	Norway	1,112	Sunk
1 March 1917	Apollonia	Kingdom of Italy	2,861	Sunk
