= SM U-71 =

History

German Empire
- Name: U-71
- Ordered: 6 January 1915
- Builder: AG Vulkan, Hamburg
- Yard number: 55
- Launched: 31 October 1915
- Commissioned: 20 December 1915
- Fate: 23 February 1919 - Surrendered to France. Broken up at Cherburg in 1921.

General characteristics
- Class & type: Type UE I submarine
- Displacement: 755 t (743 long tons) surfaced; 832 t (819 long tons) submerged
- Length: 56.80 m (186 ft 4 in) (o/a); 46.66 m (153 ft 1 in) (pressure hull)
- Beam: 5.90 m (19 ft 4 in) (o/a); 5.00 m (16 ft 5 in) (pressure hull)
- Height: 8.25 m (27 ft 1 in)
- Draught: 4.86 m (15 ft 11 in)
- Installed power: 2 × 900 PS (662 kW; 888 shp) surfaced; 2 × 900 PS (662 kW; 888 shp) submerged
- Propulsion: 2 shafts
- Speed: 10.6 knots (19.6 km/h; 12.2 mph) surfaced; 7.9 knots (14.6 km/h; 9.1 mph) submerged
- Range: 7,880 nmi (14,590 km; 9,070 mi) at 7 knots (13 km/h; 8.1 mph) surfaced; 83 nmi (154 km; 96 mi) at 4 knots (7.4 km/h; 4.6 mph) submerged
- Test depth: 50 m (164 ft 1 in)
- Complement: 4 officers, 28 enlisted
- Armament: 2 × 50 cm (19.7 in) torpedo tubes (one starboard bow, one starbord stern); 4 torpedoes; 1 × 8.8 cm (3.5 in) SK L/30 deck gun

Service record
- Part of: I Flotilla; 7 April 1916 – 11 November 1918
- Commanders: Kptlt. Hugo Schmidt; 20 December 1915 – 19 April 1917; Kptlt. Walter Gude; 20 April – 27 November 1917; Kptlt. Otto Dröscher; 28 November 1917 – 27 January 1918; Oblt.z.S. Richard Scheurlen; 28 January – 29 July 1918; Oblt.z.S. Kurt Slevogt; 30 July – 14 October 1918
- Operations: 12 patrols
- Victories: 17 merchant ships sunk (14,964 GRT); 2 warships sunk (2,731 tons); 1 auxiliary warship sunk (309 GRT); 1 merchant ship damaged (3,230 GRT); 1 warship damaged (820 tons); 1 merchant ship taken as prize (82 GRT)

SM U-71 was one of 329 submarines serving in the Imperial German Navy in World War I. U-71 was engaged in the naval warfare and took part in the First Battle of the Atlantic.

== Design ==
Type UE I submarines were preceded by the longer Type U 66 submarines. U-71 had a displacement of 755 tonnes (743 long tons) when at the surface and 832 tonnes (819 long tons) while submerged. She had a total length of 56.80 m (186 ft 4 in), a pressure hull length of 46.66 m (153 ft 1 in), a beam of 5.90 m (19 ft 4 in), a height of 8.25 m (27 ft 1 in), and a draught of 4.86 m (15 ft 11 in). The submarine was powered by two 900 metric horsepower (660 kW; 890 shp) engines for use while surfaced, and two 900 metric horsepower (660 kW; 890 shp) engines for use while submerged. She had two propeller shafts. She was capable of operating at depths of up to 50 metres (160 ft).

The submarine had a maximum surface speed of 10.6 knots (19.6 km/h; 12.2 mph) and a maximum submerged speed of 7.9 knots (14.6 km/h; 9.1 mph). When submerged, she could operate for 83 nautical miles (154 km; 96 mi) at 4 knots (7.4 km/h; 4.6 mph); when surfaced, she could travel 7,880 nautical miles (14,590 km; 9,070 mi) at 7 knots (13 km/h; 8.1 mph). U-71 was fitted with two 50 centimetres (20 in) torpedo tubes (one at the starboard bow and one starboard stern), four torpedoes, and one 8.8 centimetres (3.5 in) deck gun. She had a complement of thirty-two (twenty-eight crew members and four officers).

== Operations ==
U-71 came off the stocks at Hamburg (Vulcan) in January 1916, and joined the Kiel School where she remained until 7 April 1916, when she entered the North Sea to join the 1st Half Flotilla.

- 12 April - ? 21 April 1916. Apparently cruising in North Sea.
- 21 June – 8 July 1916. Northabout. Laid mines off Skerryvore.
- 14 October – 4 November 1916. Skagerrak. Sank 3 S.S., 1 sailing vessel.
- 11–23 December 1916. North Sea. Sank 2 S.S., 2 sailing vessels.
- 10–22 January 1917. Minelaying in North Sea, St. Magnus Bay, Shetland Isles. Returned owing to bad weather and overheating of engine.
- 6–21 February 1917. ? Laid mines in Loch Ewe, North Minch, off Butt of Lewis, Broad Bay and Firth of Lorne.
- At sea 16 May 1917 – 8 June 1917. Possible laid mines off Tory I. Sank 1 S.S., 2 sailing vessels.
- 7–26 July 1917. North Sea. Locality of her mines not fixed. Sank 223 tons.
- 1/5 September 1917. Went out 3 times and returned, the last time with defects.
- 10–14 October 1917. In Baltic. Returned with defects.
- 20–24 December 1917. Laid mines off Dutch coast.
- 29 December 1917 – 2 January 1918. Laid mines off Dutch coast. ? Took 1 prize.
- 18–23 January 1918. Laid mines off Dutch coast.
- 4–15 February 1918. Laid mines off Dutch coast. Emerged from Skagerrak and returned by Sound.
- 18–29 March 1918. Laid mines off Dutch coast. Went out by Skagerrak. Returned to Bight.
- 23 April – 2 May 1918. Laid mines off Firth of Forth.
- 18–24 June 1918. Laid mines off Aberdeen.
- Early in July – 22 July 1918. Laid mines off Firth of Forth.
- ? 29 September – 11 October 1918. ? Dutch coast. Submarine reports "Task given up".
- 23 February 1919. Surrendered at Harwich.

== Summary of raiding history ==
Date	Name	Nationality	Tonnage (Note: Merchant ship tonnages are in gross register tons. Military vessels are listed by tons displacement.)	Fate
18 October 1916	Greta	Sweden	1,370	Sunk
19 October 1916	Mercur	Sweden	711	Sunk
19 October 1916	Normandie	Sweden	1,342	Sunk
21 October 1916	Rönnaug	Norway	1,331	Sunk
13 December 1916	Solon	Denmark	137	Sunk
17 December 1916	Sjofna	Norway	528	Sunk
18 December 1916	Herø	Norway	1,106	Sunk
18 December 1916	Sieka	Netherlands	119	Sunk
19 February 1917	Halcyon	United Kingdom	190	Sunk
4 June 1917	Orion	Denmark	1,870	Sunk
5 June 1917	C. Thorén	Sweden	269	Sunk
5 June 1917	Götha	Sweden	232	Sunk
20 July 1917	Sirra	Netherlands	223	Sunk
26 July 1917	Flore	France	3,553	Sunk
26 July 1917	Ethelwynne	United Kingdom	3,230	Damaged
14 August 1917	Majorka	Norway	1,684	Sunk
31 August 1917	Taurus	United Kingdom	128	Sunk
20 October 1917	HMT Thomas Stratten	Royal Navy	309	Sunk
12 December 1917	Amadavat	United Kingdom	171	Sunk
31 December 1917	De Hoop	Netherlands	82	Captured as prize
15 August 1918	HMS Scott	Royal Navy	1,801	Sunk
15 August 1918	HMS Ulleswater (Note: According to other sources, HMS Ulleswater was sunk by UC-17.)	Royal Navy	930	Sunk
20 August 1918	HMS Shirley	Royal Navy	820	Damaged

== Bibliography ==
- Gröner, Erich; Jung, Dieter; Maass, Martin (1991). U-boats and Mine Warfare Vessels. German Warships 1815–1945. Vol. 2. Translated by Thomas, Keith; Magowan, Rachel. London: Conway Maritime Press. ISBN 0-85177-593-4.
