= German submarine U-19 =

U-19 may refer to one of the following German submarines:

- SM U-19, was the lead ship of the Type U 19 submarines; launched in 1912 and served in the First World War until surrendered on 24 November 1918
  - During the First World War, Germany also had these submarines with similar names:
    - SM UB-19, a Type UB II submarine launched in 1915 and sunk 30 November 1916
    - SM UC-19, a Type UC II submarine launched in 1916 and sunk 6 December 1916
- German submarine U-19 (1935), a Type IIB submarine that served in the Second World War and was scuttled on 11 September 1944
- German submarine U-19 (S198), a Type 206 submarine of the Bundesmarine that was launched in 1973 and scrapped in 1998
