= SS Telena =

History

United Kingdom
- Name: Telena
- Operator: Marcus Samuel & Company, London (1895-1898); Shell Transport & Trading, London (1898-1907); Anglo-Saxon Petroleum, London (1907-1917)
- Builder: William Gray & Company, West Hartlepool
- Launched: 19 September 1895
- Completed: November 1895
- Fate: Sunk on 21 April 1917

General characteristics
- Class & type: Oil tanker
- Tonnage: 4,778 GRT; 3,124 NRT
- Length: 375.5 ft (114.5 m)
- Beam: 48 ft (15 m)
- Depth: 29.8 ft (9.1 m)
- Propulsion: T3cyl (27.5, 43.5, 73 x 48in), 398 nhp, 1 screw, engine aft

SS Telena was a British merchant ship that was torpedoed and sunk in the Atlantic Ocean 170 nautical miles (310 km) west north west of the Fastnet Rock (51°16′N 14°00′W) by German submarine SM U-61 on 21 April 1917. Her crew survived. She was en route from Philadelphia to Queenstown, with a cargo of benzine.

She was built in 1895 by William Gray & Company of West Hartlepool, she was initially operated by Marcus Samuel & Company, London, the forerunner of Shell Transport & Trading, to which company Telena was transferred on its restructuring in 1898. She was transferred to the subsidiary company Anglo-Saxon Petroleum when it took over Shell's shipping assets in 1907. On 15 December 1916 Telena was inbound to Norfolk, Virginia, when at 8:14 p.m. she collided with the Merchants and Miners Transportation Company's vessel SS Powhatan southeast of Thimble Shoal Light in the deep channel of the lower Chesapeake Bay. Both ships were damaged with Powatan beached with ship and cargo a total loss. Court findings were that Powhatan, in confused signals, had cut across Telena's course rather than pass port to port with the responsibility for the collision resting entirely with Powhatan. On appeal of that decision the Fourth Circuit Court of Appeals dismissed the case and found it "unnecessary to add anything to the full and fair discussion" of the case in the lower court. Powhatan was later salvaged and returned to service as SS Cuba.

== Bibliography ==
- "The Powhatan—The Telena". United States Circuit Courts of Appeals Reports. Vol. 168. West Publishing Company. 1920.
- "The Powhatan—The Telena". The Federal Reporter. Vol. 248. West Publishing Company. 1918.
- "First Motor Driven Passenger Ship". Morse Dry Dock Dial. Vol. 3, no. 12. Morse Dry Dock and Repair Company. December 1920.
