= SS Yorktown =

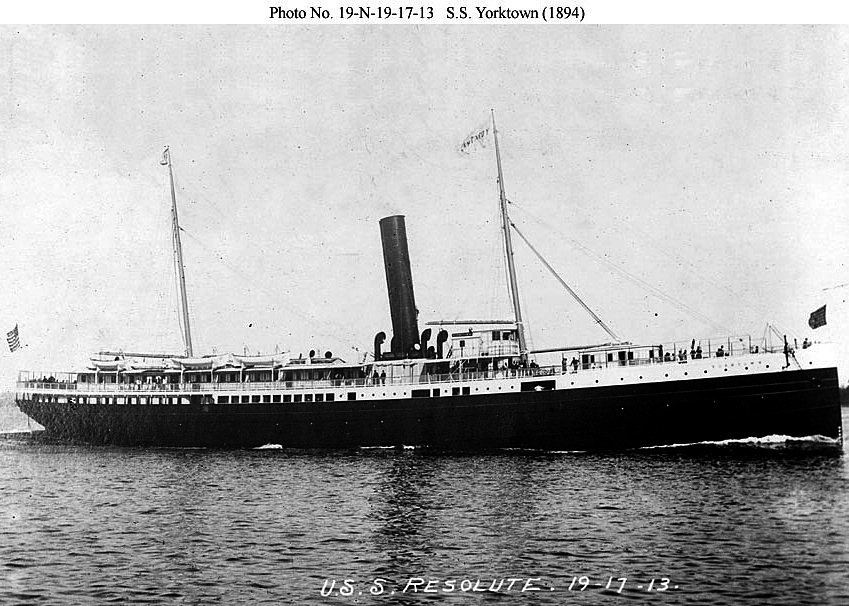
- SS Yorktown (1894)

History

United States
- Name: Yorktown (1894); USS Resolute (1898); USAT Rawlins (1900); Powhatan (1902); Cuba (1920); Seneca (?)
- Namesake: Resolute: marked by firm determination; resolved.
- Owner: Old Dominion Steamship Company (1894–1898); United States government (1898–1902); Merchants and Miners Transportation Company (1902–1916); sunk, hulk underwriters? (1916–1919); Miami Steamship Company (1919–?); unknown sunk December 30, 1927
- Builder: Delaware River Iron Ship Building and Engine Works, Chester, Pennsylvania
- Launched: February 10, 1894
- Acquired: by Navy April 21, 1898
- Commissioned: by Navy May 11, 1898
- Decommissioned: December 15, 1899, by Navy
- In service: 1894–1927
- Out of service: December 30, 1927
- Fate: Burned and sank December 30, 1927, at Hoboken, New Jersey, refloated September 2, 1928, and scrapped.

General characteristics
- Type: Auxiliary cruiser and transport
- Displacement: 4,175 long tons (4,242 t)
- Length: 310 ft (94 m)
- Beam: 40 ft (12 m)
- Draft: 18 ft (5.5 m)
- Depth of hold: 26 ft 9 in (8.15 m)
- Propulsion: Steam engine
- Speed: 16 kn (18 mph; 30 km/h)
- Complement: 87
- Armament: 4 × 6-pounder guns

General characteristics
- Type: Turbo-electric passenger vessel
- Displacement: 3,580 long tons (3,640 t)
- Length: 328 ft (100 m) LOA
- Beam: 40 ft (12 m)
- Draft: 17 ft (5.2 m) (mean)
- Depth of hold: 26 ft 9 in (8.15 m)
- Installed power: 2 × 150-kilowatt General Electric turbo-generator sets
- Propulsion: Turbo-electric, General Electric eight-stage turbo-generator set providing power at 1,100 volts, 1,234 amperes rated at 2,350 kilowatts, delivering 50-cycle alternating current to the General Electric synchronous-type electric motor with a rated 3,000 horsepower running at 1,150 volts and 1,180 amperes driving the shaft and 15-foot (4.6 m) four-bladed propeller.
- Speed: 17.28 kn (19.89 mph; 32.00 km/h)
- Notes: After 1919–1920 rebuild of Powhatan to Cuba.

SS Yorktown was launched February 10, 1894, by Delaware River Iron Ship Building and Engine Works, Chester, Pennsylvania for the Old Dominion Steamship Company for the company's overnight New York City/Norfolk, Virginia service. The United States Navy purchased Yorktown on April 21, 1898, to be commissioned as the second USS Resolute, an auxiliary cruiser and transport that saw naval service during the Spanish–American War 1898–1899. The United States Department of War acquired the ship on January 22, 1900, for service as the United States Army Transport (USAT) Rawlins. The ship was sold to the Merchants and Miners Transportation Company of Baltimore, Maryland on July 27, 1901, and renamed Powhatan. Powhatan was wrecked in 1916 and in 1919 rebuilt as the world's first turbo-electric propelled passenger ship Cuba for luxury passenger and express freight service between Florida and Cuba with the Miami Steamship Company beginning service in 1920. Renamed Seneca, the ship burned and sank December 30, 1927, at Hoboken, New Jersey then refloated September 2, 1928, and scrapped.

Over the ship's career she went aground at Santiago, Cuba, then two months later burned and sank at Brooklyn in 1901, collided and sank in 1916 in the Chesapeake Bay and finally burned and sank in Hoboken, in 1927.

== Construction ==
Yorktown, an iron-hulled passenger ship, was launched on February 10, 1894, by Delaware River Shipbuilding and Engine Works at Chester, Pennsylvania for the Old Dominion Steamship Company. Yorktown was the last ship on order, and when completed the company warned it would be forced to close for the first time in its history unless new orders were placed, putting the 100 men, down from 1,500 a few years before, out of work with depressive impact on the town of Chester.

== Old Dominion Steamship Company service, 1894–1898 ==
The company served ports in the Chesapeake Bay with weekday, overnight freight and passenger service between New York, pier 26, North River, and Norfolk (Old Point Comfort) with routes extending to Richmond, Virginia, and Washington, D.C. Service by Yorktown and sister ship Jamestown was planned to begin April 10, 1894. On March 19, 1898, Yorktown was advertised by the company as the most comfortable way to travel from New York, sailing at 3 p.m. on March 22 and arriving the next morning for a $13 fare that included berth and meals, to see the "Launching of the Great Twin Battleships Kearsarge and Kentucky" on March 24, 1898, at Newport News.

== United States government service, 1898–1902 ==
The U.S. Navy purchased Yorktown from the Old Dominion Steamship Company on April 21, 1898, for Spanish–American War service commissioning the ship as USS Resolute on May 11, 1898.

=== United States Navy service, 1898–1899 ===
Resolute departed New York City on May 25, 1898, assigned to cruise between Môle-Saint-Nicolas, Haiti, and Santiago de Cuba, Cuba, in search of the Spanish Navy squadron commanded by Admiral Pascual Cervera y Topete. After calling at Key West, Florida, on June 8, Resolute returned to the southeast Cuban coast to assist the U.S. fleet in scouting, relying on her high speed for protection. She was present on July 3 at the Battle of Santiago de Cuba, steaming eastward to warn United States Army transports of the Spanish squadron's emergence from the harbor of Santiago de Cuba. Subsequently, Resolute transported Spanish prisoners-of-war to the United States, departing the Cuban coast on July 8 for Charleston, South Carolina; Newport News, Virginia; Tompkinsville, New York; and New York City.

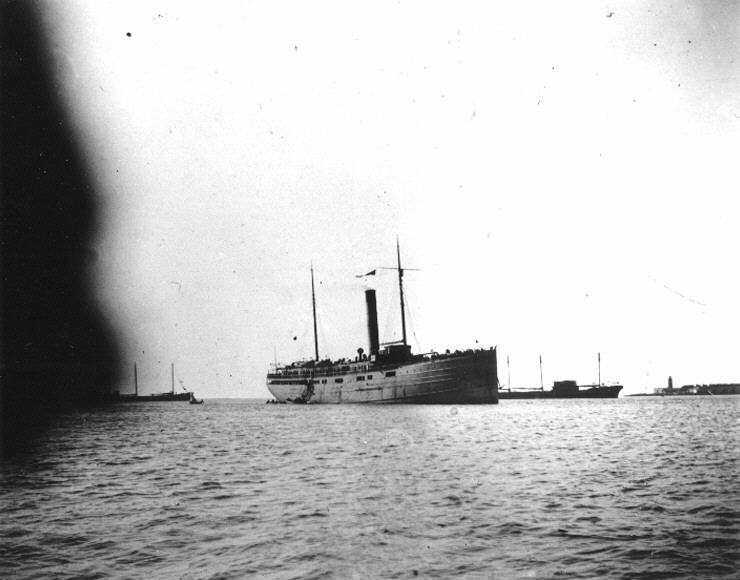
USS Resolute off Portsmouth, New Hampshire, probably while serving as a marker ship for the sea trials of the new battleship Kearsarge in May–September 1899. (Note: The suggestion at the U.S. Naval Historical Center Online Library of Selected Images that the photo possibly shows Resolute in July 1898 while transporting Spanish prisoners-of-war captured during the Spanish–American War does not appear possible, as the ship operated off Portsmouth only during the Kearsarge trials of 1899.)

Resolute returned to the Cuban war zone late in July engaging Spanish shore batteries at Manzanillo, Cuba, on August 12, but sailed for the United States carrying returning Marines from the First Battalion who had made the first assault landing at Guantánamo Bay. The ship reached New York on August 23 and after inspection continued to Portsmouth Harbor the next day, where the First Marine Battalion was disembarked.

In October, Resolute embarked the Evacuation Commission at Nuevitas, Cuba, for transportation to Havana, Cuba, and Key West, and again to Havana. Then she returned American troops home to the U.S.

Resolute was out of service until December, while being fumigated following an outbreak of yellow fever on board. She then steamed between Havana and Key West on transport missions through March 1899. Her final service was as a marker vessel for the steam trials of the new battleship Kearsarge at Portsmouth, New Hampshire, from May–September 1899. The ship arrived at Philadelphia, Pennsylvania, on October 2 for decommissioning effective on December 15, 1899, at League Island Navy Yard.

=== United States Army service, 1900–1902 ===
Resolute was transferred to the United States Department of War on January 22, 1900, for service with the Army Transport Service as the United States Army Transport (USAT) Rawlins. The ship was aground on a coral reef at Santiago, Cuba when on the way to embark the troops of the Tenth United States Infantry destined for New York. Then, on April 10, 1901, Rawlins was to have sailed from New York to Havana, Cuba with miscellaneous cargo, largely horse feed, but caught fire in the engine room with the result of a two alarm fire bringing six engines, two trucks and three fireboats and so much water pumped aboard by 9:30 a.m. that she rolled over, flooded and sank with deck awash at the Army's pier at Pacific Street, Brooklyn. There was no loss of life but four men were overcome by smoke and damage was estimated at $20,000 to refloat and $50,000 to repair. Rawlins was sold to the Merchants and Miners Transportation Company of Baltimore, Maryland on July 27, 1901, for $200,000.

== Later career, 1902–1928 ==
The ship was returned to mercantile service in 1902 and operated under the names SS Powhatan, SS Cuba, and SS Seneca.

=== Powatan ===
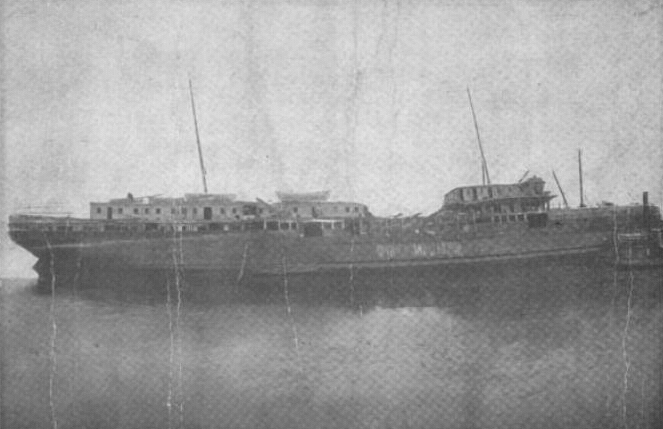
SS Powhatan shortly after being brought to the surface.

Renamed Powatan the ship began Norfolk, Virginia—Boston, Massachusetts service with the Merchants and Miners Transportation Company. The company is shown in a 1908 railway guide with twenty-four ships and routes extending from Boston to Savannah, Georgia.

At about 8:14 p.m. December 15, 1916, outbound Powatan collided with the 375 feet 6 inches (114.5 m) inbound British ship Telena southeast of Thimble Shoal Light in the deep channel of the lower Chesapeake Bay. (Note: Dates of December 8 and 13 were found in other references; however, presumption is that a formal court record would have the most accurate date of such an incident.) Both ships were damaged with Powatan beached with ship and cargo a total loss. Court findings were that Powatan, in confused signals, had cut across Telena's course rather than pass port to port with the responsibility for the collision resting entirely with Powatan. On appeal of that decision the Fourth Circuit Court of Appeals dismissed the case and found it "unnecessary to add anything to the full and fair discussion" of the case in the lower court.

Powhatan was declared a total loss by both owners and underwriters and remained unsalvaged for months until World War I demands for shipping and skyrocketing ship values resulted in the hulk being raised and taken into Norfolk, Virginia until a rehabilitation plan was established. Powatan, described as "rusted, wasted hulk of a ship" that "shipping men" described as "the most hopeless" after two years on mud flats, was "yanked" off the mud and towed to New York by Morse tugs escorted as far as Barnegat, New Jersey by osprey's with two eggs in a nest in the masthead lamp. (Note: The photo of the hulk in this reference shows the vessel stripped of all superstructure and deck houses with a stream of water being ejected from the port side.) At the Morse Dry Dock and Repair Company's Brooklyn yard damaged and corroded plates and frames were removed along with all machinery and there "was scarcely a whole shell" by the time the rebuild that converted the ship into the world's first electric drive passenger ship, SS Cuba, began.

=== Cuba—world's first electric drive passenger ship ===
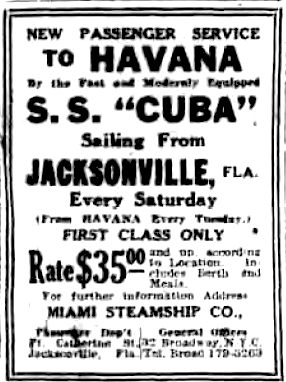
December 4, 1920, advertisement in New York Evening Post.

The rebuilt Powhatan, renamed Cuba, underwent trials and began operation in late 1920 as the world's first passenger ship with turbo-electric drive and all lighting and auxiliary machinery also being electric. On trials with the propulsion motor delivering full 3,000 horsepower, the ship attained a speed of 17.28 knots.

Cuba was a relatively small ship of 3,580 tons displacement at 17 feet (5.2 m) draft, 320 feet 6 inches (97.7 m) length overall and was not intended by the owners, Miami Steamship Company, to carry any cargo other than automobiles on deck, express freight and some refrigerated fruit with emphasis put of passenger accommodations and spaces—so that Cuba could "well be called a luxurious yacht rather than a passenger steamship". The rebuilding into Cuba was sponsored by Charles L. Dimon, grandson of John Dimon, partner in the firm Smith & Dimon that had designed and built 1845 clipper Rainbow and the 1846 clipper Sea Witch, backed by the General Electric Company which Dimon had selected to furnish electrical equipment including the main propulsion. Initial references are for first-class-only service between to Florida ports and Havana, Cuba but later advertisements are for "New York direct to Miami" service leaving New York every Saturday.

==== Engineering ====
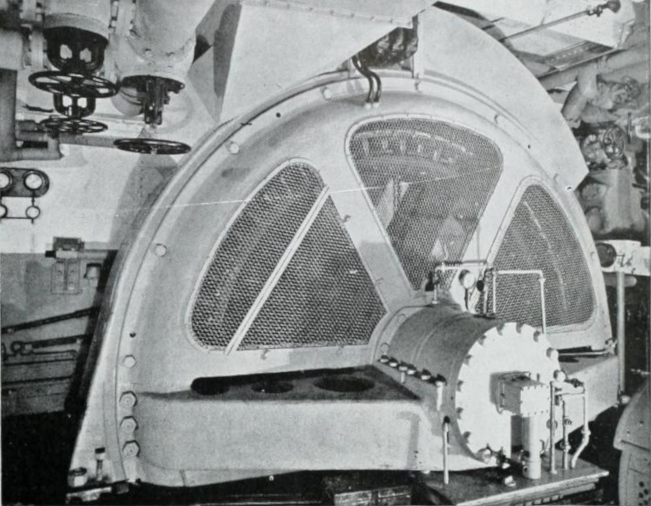
3,000-horsepower, 1,150-volt, 1,180-ampere electric propulsion motor installed in Cuba.

Electric power was provided by a steam plant of four Scotch boilers, each with three oil-fired furnaces, driving a General Electric eight-stage turbo-generator set which in turn provided power at 1,100 volts, 1,234 amperes rated at 2,350 kilowatts delivering 50-cycle alternating current to the General Electric synchronous-type electric motor with a rated 3,000 horsepower running at 1,150 volts and 1,180 amperes driving the shaft and 15-foot (4.6 m), four-bladed propeller with pitch of 8 feet 9 inches (2.7 m) of the built-up type with cast-iron hub and manganese bronze blades. Motor control was by two levers, one for motor speed and another for forward or reverse.

Two 150-kilowatt General Electric turbo-generator sets provided lighting and power for auxiliary machinery with a half-kilowatt Holtzer-Cabot Electric Company generator providing power for wireless communication with an emergency lighting generator set driven by a gasoline engine on the upper deck. Capstans and winches were all-electric, including the windlass for the two bower anchors of 5,110 pounds (2,317.9 kg) each. Steering gear, not electric, was steam driven, as were various engineering pumps; main boiler feed pump, auxiliary feed, circulating and air pumps. Two eight ton refrigeration plants were installed forward.

==== Accommodations ====
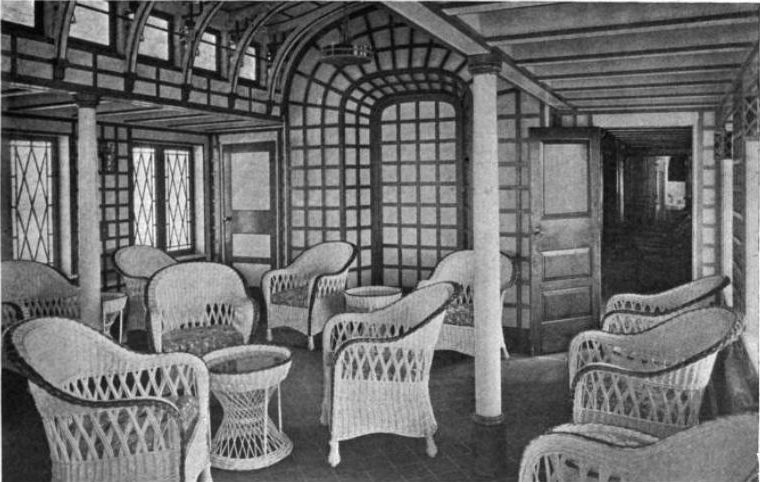
Verandah Café.

Passenger staterooms, with double berths and private baths, were in the forward superstructure with the dining room furnished with tables seating four. To aid in handling passenger's automobiles the vessel's side auto port was designed to allow the largest limousines then built to be driven, rather than hoisted, aboard. Among the passenger spaces were a card room on the boat deck aft of the officer's quarters and radio room; a smoking room with a large mahogany bar and end-to-end skylight aft of the card room and the Verandah Café aft of the smoking room. The Verandah Café was designed to imitate a typical verandah with running vines and trellis work, furniture in ivory and green and large windows opening to the sea breeze.

=== Seneca ===
On December 30, 1927, Seneca burned and sank at Hoboken, New Jersey. She was refloated on September 2, 1928, and subsequently scrapped.

== Bibliography ==
- Allen, W.F. (1908). "Merchants and Miners Transportation Co". Official Guide of the Railways and Steam Navigation Lines of the United States, Porto Rico, Canada, Mexico and Cuba. 40 (8). National Railway Publication Company.
- "Yet They Want Free Ships". The American Economist. XIII. The American Protective Tariff League. May 18, 1894.
- "Advertisements: Ocean Steamships". Brooklyn Daily Eagle. March 19, 1898.
- "Davy Jones' Locker Forced to Release the S.S. Powhatan—Sharks Ousted From Boiler Room". Brooklyn Daily Eagle. October 26, 1919.
- "Advertisement: New York Direct to Miami S.S. "Cuba"". Brooklyn Daily Eagle. January 18, 1925.
- Circuit Courts of Appeals, Fourth Circuit (1920). "The Powhatan—The Telena". United States Circuit Courts of Appeals Reports. 168. West Publishing Company.
- District Court, Eastern District, Virginia (1918). "The Powhatan—The Telena". The Federal Reporter. 248. West Publishing Company.
- Kelley, James A. (December 1920). "Electrically Propelled Passenger Ship Cuba". Marine Engineering. Vol. XXV, no. 12. Aldrich Publishing Company. pp. 949–961.
- Kelley, James A. (January 1921). "First Turbo-electric Passenger Ship". Pacific Marine Review. No. 1. Pacific American Steamship Association. pp. 22–24.
- "First Motor Driven Passenger Ship". Morse Dry Dock Dial. Vol. 3. Morse Dry Dock and Repair Company. December 1920.
- "Resolute II (Iron Passenger Liner)". Dictionary of American Naval Fighting Ships. Naval History And Heritage Command. 2005.
- "Fireboats attend to the burning S.S. Seneca in Hoboken, N.J. as reporters watch". New York Daily News. December 30, 1927. Archived from the original on October 21, 2014.
- "Transport Rawlins Aground; Strikes On Coral Reef Near Wreck Of The Merrimac In Harbor At Santiago". New York Times. February 11, 1901.
- "Largest American Ship Repair Plant". Pacific Marine Review. Vol. 17, no. 10. Pacific American Steamship Association / Shipowners' Association of the Pacific Coast. October 1920.
- "Army Transport In Flames Is Sunk At Brooklyn Pier". San Francisco Call. Vol. 87. April 11, 1901.
- Annual Reports of the War Department: Report of the Quartermaster General—Army Transport Service. United States Department of War. 1903.
- "Deep Sea Soundings" (PDF). The Weekly Press. New York. February 14, 1894.
