= SM U-63 (Germany) =

German WWI submarine

History

German Empire
- Name: U-63
- Ordered: 17 May 1915
- Builder: Germaniawerft, Kiel
- Yard number: 247
- Laid down: 30 April 1915
- Launched: 8 February 1916
- Commissioned: 11 March 1916
- Fate: Surrendered 16 January 1919. Broken up at Blyth in 1919-20

General characteristics
- Class & type: Type U 63 submarine
- Displacement: 810 t (800 long tons) surfaced; 927 t (912 long tons) submerged
- Length: 68.36 m (224 ft 3 in) (o/a); 55.55 m (182 ft 3 in) (pressure hull)
- Beam: 6.30 m (20 ft 8 in) (oa); 4.15 m (13 ft 7 in) (pressure hull)
- Height: 7.65 m (25 ft 1 in)
- Draught: 4.04 m (13 ft 3 in)
- Installed power: 2 × 2,200 PS (1,618 kW; 2,170 shp) surfaced; 2 × 1,200 PS (883 kW; 1,184 shp) submerged
- Propulsion: 2 shafts
- Speed: 16.5 knots (30.6 km/h; 19.0 mph) surfaced; 9 knots (17 km/h; 10 mph) submerged
- Range: 9,170 nmi (16,980 km; 10,550 mi) at 8 knots (15 km/h; 9.2 mph) surfaced; 60 nmi (110 km; 69 mi) at 5 knots (9.3 km/h; 5.8 mph) submerged
- Test depth: 50 m (164 ft 1 in)
- Complement: 36
- Armament: 4 × 50 cm (19.7 in) torpedo tubes (two bow, two stern); 8 torpedoes; 1 × 8.8 cm (3.5 in) SK L/30 deck gun

Service record
- Part of: IV Flotilla; 2 May - 6 November 1916; Pola / Mittelmeer / Mittelmeer I Flotilla; 6 November 1916 - 11 November 1918
- Commanders: Kptlt. Otto Schultze; 11 March 1916 – 27 August 1917 , 15 October – 24 December 1917; Kptlt. Heinrich Metzger; 28 August – 14 October 1917; Kptlt. Kurt Hartwig; 25 December 1917 – 11 November 1918
- Operations: 12 patrols
- Victories: 69 merchant ships sunk (192,145 GRT); 1 warship sunk (5,250 tons); 3 auxiliary warships sunk (6,020 GRT); 11 merchant ships damaged (47,700 GRT); 2 warships damaged (2,540 tons)

SM U-63 was one of the 329 submarines serving in the Imperial German Navy in World War I. U-63 was engaged in naval warfare and took part in the First Battle of the Atlantic.

== Summary of raiding history ==
Date	Name	Nationality	Tonnage (Note: Merchant ship tonnages are in gross register tons. Military vessels are listed by tons displacement.)	Fate
4 July 1916	HMS Rosemary	Royal Navy	1,250	Damaged
20 August 1916	HMS Falmouth	Royal Navy	5,250	Sunk
23 October 1916	Bayreaulx	United Kingdom	3,009	Sunk
28 October 1916	Lanao	United States	692	Sunk
28 October 1916	Rio Pirahy	United Kingdom	3,561	Sunk
28 October 1916	Selene	Italy	3,955	Sunk
28 October 1916	Torsdal	Norway	3,621	Sunk
29 October 1916	Massalia	Greece	2,186	Sunk
29 October 1916	Meroë	United Kingdom	3,552	Sunk
29 October 1916	Torino	United Kingdom	1,850	Sunk
31 October 1916	Delto	Norway	3,193	Sunk
31 October 1916	Fedelta	Italy	1,906	Sunk
27 November 1916	Maude Larssen	United Kingdom	1,222	Sunk
28 November 1916	Sigurd	Denmark	2,119	Sunk
30 November 1916	Roma	United Kingdom	125	Sunk
2 December 1916	Luigi C.	Italy	71	Sunk
2 December 1916	Roma	Italy	643	Sunk
3 December 1916	HMS Perugia	Royal Navy	4,348	Sunk
5 December 1916	Grigorios Anghelatos	Greece	3,635	Sunk
11 December 1916	Magellan	France	6,027	Sunk
11 December 1916	Sinai	France	4,624	Sunk
25 March 1917	Vellore	United Kingdom	4,926	Sunk
26 March 1917	L. Rahmanich	Egypt	79	Sunk
1 April 1917	Zambesi	United Kingdom	3,759	Sunk
4 April 1917	Margit	United Kingdom	2,490	Sunk
5 April 1917	Solstad	Norway	4,147	Sunk
5 April 1917	Kangaroo	United Kingdom	4,348	Damaged
28 April 1917	Carmelo Padre	Italy	74	Sunk
28 April 1917	Giuseppe Padre I	Italy	102	Sunk
28 April 1917	Giuseppina G.	Italy	100	Sunk
28 April 1917	I Due Fratelli P.	Italy	97	Sunk
28 April 1917	Karonga	United Kingdom	4,665	Sunk
28 April 1917	Natale B.	Italy	55	Sunk
28 April 1917	San Francesco Di Paola	Italy	41	Sunk
3 May 1917	Washington	United Kingdom	5,080	Sunk
4 May 1917	Transylvania	United Kingdom	14,348	Sunk
5 May 1917	Talawa	United Kingdom	3,834	Damaged
7 May 1917	Crown of Leon	United Kingdom	3,391	Damaged
14 May 1917	Francesco Raiola	Italy	181	Sunk
14 May 1917	Volga	United Kingdom	4,404	Damaged
15 May 1917	Ferrara	Italy	5,660	Damaged
22 June 1917	Himalaya	France	5,620	Sunk
23 June 1917	Craonne	France	777	Sunk
23 June 1917	Kalypso Vergotti	Greece	2,819	Sunk
26 June 1917	Birdoswald	United Kingdom	4,013	Sunk
27 June 1917	Tong Hong	United Kingdom	2,184	Sunk
30 June 1917	Alkelda	Italy	98	Sunk
30 June 1917	Enrichetta	Italy	3,638	Sunk
1 July 1917	Marie	France	118	Sunk
2 July 1917	Argentario	Italy	739	Sunk
3 July 1917	Immacolatina	Italy	54	Sunk
5 September 1917	Proletaire	France	101	Sunk
11 September 1917	Embleton	United Kingdom	5,377	Sunk
12 September 1917	Reim	Norway	1,126	Sunk
15 September 1917	Platuria	United States	3,445	Sunk
18 September 1917	Arendal	United Kingdom	1,387	Sunk
26 September 1917	Heraklios	Greece	2,878	Sunk
5 November 1917	Hilda R.	United Kingdom	136	Sunk
5 November 1917	Kai	Denmark	1,391	Sunk
6 November 1917	HMS Peveril	Royal Navy	1,459	Sunk
8 November 1917	HMS Candytuft	Royal Navy	1,290	Damaged
8 November 1917	Benledi	United Kingdom	3,931	Damaged
9 November 1917	Ardglamis	United Kingdom	4,540	Sunk
14 November 1917	Trowbridge	United Kingdom	3,712	Sunk
16 November 1917	Gasconia	United Kingdom	3,801	Sunk
16 November 1917	Kyno	United Kingdom	3,034	Sunk
18 November 1917	Huntsgulf	United Kingdom	3,185	Damaged
20 November 1917	Commendatore Carlo Bruno	Italy	813	Sunk
21 November 1917	Mossoul	France	3,135	Sunk
5 January 1918	Rio Claro	United Kingdom	3,687	Sunk
8 January 1918	San Guglielmo	Italy	8,145	Sunk
15 January 1918	Bonanova	Spain	933	Sunk
18 January 1918	Maria P.	United Kingdom	263	Sunk
18 January 1918	Ville De Bordeaux	France	4,857	Sunk
22 January 1918	Anglo-Canadian	United Kingdom	4,239	Sunk
22 January 1918	Manchester Spinner	United Kingdom	4,247	Sunk
19 May 1918	Saxilby	United Kingdom	3,630	Damaged
19 May 1918	Snowdon	United Kingdom	3,189	Sunk
24 May 1918	Elysia	United Kingdom	6,397	Damaged
30 May 1918	Antinous	United Kingdom	3,682	Damaged
30 May 1918	Asiatic Prince	United Kingdom	2,887	Sunk
30 May 1918	Aymeric	United Kingdom	4,363	Sunk
11 August 1918	City of Adelaide	United Kingdom	8,389	Sunk
12 August 1918	G6	Regia Marina	213	Sunk
24 August 1918	Delphinula	United Kingdom	5,238	Damaged
16 October 1918	War Council	United Kingdom	5,875	Sunk

== Bibliography ==
- Gröner, Erich; Jung, Dieter; Maass, Martin (1991). German Warships 1815–1945, U-boats and Mine Warfare Vessels. Vol. 2. Translated by Thomas, Keith; Magowan, Rachel. London: Conway Maritime Press. ISBN 0-85177-593-4.
