= SM UC-19 =

1915 German Type UC II minelaying U-boat

History

German Empire
- Name: UC-19
- Ordered: 29 August 1915
- Builder: Blohm & Voss, Hamburg
- Yard number: 269
- Launched: 15 March 1916
- Commissioned: 21 August 1916
- Fate: Sunk, 6 December 1916

General characteristics
- Class & type: Type UC II submarine
- Displacement: 417 t (410 long tons), surfaced; 493 t (485 long tons), submerged
- Length: 49.35 m (161 ft 11 in) o/a; 39.30 m (128 ft 11 in) pressure hull
- Beam: 5.22 m (17 ft 2 in) o/a; 3.65 m (12 ft) pressure hull
- Draught: 3.68 m (12 ft 1 in)
- Propulsion: 2 × propeller shafts; 2 × 6-cylinder, 4-stroke diesel engines, 500 PS (370 kW; 490 bhp); 2 × electric motors, 460 PS (340 kW; 450 shp)
- Speed: 11.6 knots (21.5 km/h; 13.3 mph), surfaced; 7.0 knots (13.0 km/h; 8.1 mph), submerged
- Range: 9,430 nautical miles (17,460 km; 10,850 mi) at 7 knots (13 km/h; 8.1 mph), surfaced; 55 nautical miles (102 km; 63 mi) at 4 knots (7.4 km/h; 4.6 mph), submerged
- Test depth: 50 m (160 ft)
- Complement: 26
- Armament: 6 × 100 cm (39.4 in) mine tubes; 18 × UC 200 mines; 3 × 50 cm (19.7 in) torpedo tubes (2 bow/external; one stern); 7 × torpedoes; 1 × 8.8 cm (3.5 in) Uk L/30 deck gun
- Notes: 35-second diving time

Service record
- Part of: Flandern Flotilla; 9 November - 6 December 1916
- Commanders: Oblt.z.S. Alfred Nitzsche; 22 August – 6 December 1916
- Operations: 3 patrols
- Victories: 3 merchant ships sunk (3,509 GRT); 1 auxiliary warship sunk (275 GRT)

SM UC-19 was a German Type UC II minelaying submarine or U-boat in the German Imperial Navy (German: Kaiserliche Marine) during World War I. The U-boat was ordered on 29 August 1915 and was launched on 15 March 1916. She was commissioned into the German Imperial Navy on 21 August 1916 as SM UC-19. (Note: "SM" stands for "Seiner Majestät" (English: His Majesty's) and combined with the U for Unterseeboot would be translated as His Majesty's Submarine.) In three patrols UC-19 was credited with sinking four ships, either by torpedo or by mines laid. UC-19 was sunk by depth charges from HMS Landrail in the English Channel on 6 December 1916.

== Design ==
Like all pre-UC-25 Type UC II submarines, UC-19 had a displacement of 417 tonnes (410 long tons) when at the surface and 493 tonnes (485 long tons) while submerged. She had a total length of 49.35 m (161 ft 11 in), a beam of 5.22 m (17 ft 2 in), and a draught of 3.65 m (12 ft). The submarine was powered by two six-cylinder four-stroke diesel engines each producing 250 metric horsepower (180 kW; 250 shp) (a total of 500 metric horsepower (370 kW; 490 shp)), two electric motors producing 460 metric horsepower (340 kW; 450 shp), and two propeller shafts. She had a dive time of 35 seconds and was capable of operating at a depth of 50 metres (160 ft).

The submarine had a maximum surface speed of 11.6 knots (21.5 km/h; 13.3 mph) and a submerged speed of 7 knots (13 km/h; 8.1 mph). When submerged, she could operate for 55 nautical miles (102 km; 63 mi) at 4 knots (7.4 km/h; 4.6 mph); when surfaced, she could travel 9,430 nautical miles (17,460 km; 10,850 mi) at 7 knots (13 km/h; 8.1 mph). UC-19 was fitted with six 100 centimetres (39 in) mine tubes, eighteen UC 200 mines, three 50 centimetres (20 in) torpedo tubes (one on the stern and two on the bow), seven torpedoes, and one 8.8 cm (3.5 in) Uk L/30 deck gun. Her complement was twenty-six crew members.

== Previously recorded fate ==
UC-19 was thought to have been sunk in the English Channel by depth charges from HMS Ariel. This attack was likely against UB-29.

== Summary of raiding history ==
Date	Name	Nationality	Tonnage (Note: Merchant ship tonnages are in gross register tons. Military vessels are listed by tons displacement.)	Fate
24 November 1916	HMT Dhoon	Royal Navy	275	Sunk
1 December 1916	Rene Montrieux	France	234	Sunk
9 January 1917	Fernebo	Sweden	1,440	Sunk
11 January 1917	Ole Bull	Norway	1,835	Sunk
