= U72 =

U72 may refer to:

- German submarine U-72, various vessels
- HMS Weston (U72), a sloop of the Royal Navy
- Small nucleolar RNA SNORA72
- Small retrosnub icosicosidodecahedron
- U72, a line of the Düsseldorf Stadtbahn
