= SM U-64 =

Submarine

Coordinates: 38°07′N 10°27′E

History

German Empire
- Name: U-64
- Ordered: 17 May 1915
- Builder: Germaniawerft, Kiel
- Yard number: 248
- Laid down: 19 May 1915
- Launched: 29 February 1916
- Commissioned: 15 April 1916
- Fate: Sunk 17 June 1918

General characteristics
- Class & type: Type U 63 submarine
- Displacement: 810 t (800 long tons) surfaced; 927 t (912 long tons) submerged
- Length: 68.36 m (224 ft 3 in) (o/a); 55.55 m (182 ft 3 in) (pressure hull)
- Beam: 6.30 m (20 ft 8 in) (oa); 4.15 m (13 ft 7 in) (pressure hull)
- Height: 7.65 m (25 ft 1 in)
- Draught: 4.04 m (13 ft 3 in)
- Installed power: 2 × 2,200 PS (1,618 kW; 2,170 shp) surfaced; 2 × 1,200 PS (883 kW; 1,184 shp) submerged
- Propulsion: 2 shafts
- Speed: 16.5 knots (30.6 km/h; 19.0 mph) surfaced; 9.0 knots (16.7 km/h; 10.4 mph) submerged
- Range: 9,170 nmi (16,980 km; 10,550 mi) at 8 knots (15 km/h; 9.2 mph) surfaced; 60 nmi (110 km; 69 mi) at 5 knots (9.3 km/h; 5.8 mph) submerged
- Test depth: 50 m (164 ft 1 in)
- Complement: 36
- Armament: 4 × 50 cm (19.7 in) torpedo tubes (two bow, two stern); 8 torpedoes; 1 × 10.5 cm (4.1 in) SK L/40 deck gun

Service record
- Part of: IV Flotilla; 31 May – 19 November 1916; Pola / Mittelmeer / Mittelmeer I Flotilla; 19 November 1916 – 17 June 1918
- Commanders: Kptlt. Robert Moraht; 15 April 1916 – 17 June 1918
- Operations: 10 patrols
- Victories: 44 merchant ships sunk (129,327 GRT); 1 warship sunk (18,300 tons); 1 auxiliary warship sunk (243 GRT); 3 merchant ships damaged (9,420 GRT); 1 merchant ship taken as prize (186 GRT)

SM U-64 was a Type U 63 submarine in the Imperial German Navy that served during World War I. She was built in 1916 and served in the Mediterranean Sea.

On 19 March 1917, while on patrol in the Tyrrhenian Sea, U-64 encountered the French battleship Danton 30 nautical miles (56 km; 35 mi) south of Sardinia. U-64 torpedoed Danton which sank in 45 minutes with the loss of 296 men.

During her career, U-64 was under the command of Kapitänleutnant Robert Moraht. She was lost on 17 June 1918 at position.

== Summary of raiding history ==
Date	Name	Nationality	Tonnage (Note: Merchant ship tonnages are in gross register tons. Military vessels are listed by tons displacement.)	Fate
25 September 1916	Bella	United Kingdom	11	Sunk
26 September 1916	Loch Ryan	United Kingdom	186	Captured as prize
10 November 1916	Freja	Denmark	2,168	Sunk
10 November 1916	Tripel	Norway	4,633	Sunk
15 November 1916	F. Matarazzo	United Kingdom	2,823	Sunk
17 February 1917	HMT Hawk	Royal Navy	243	Sunk
17 February 1917	Okement	United Kingdom	4,349	Sunk
18 February 1917	Asturian	United Kingdom	3,193	Damaged
19 February 1917	Corso	United Kingdom	3,242	Sunk
12 March 1917	Nina M.	Italy	118	Sunk
16 March 1917	Catania	Italy	3,188	Sunk
17 March 1917	Tripoli	Italy	658	Sunk
19 March 1917	Danton	French Navy	18,300	Sunk
23 March 1917	Eptalofos	United Kingdom	4,413	Sunk
25 March 1917	Berbera	United Kingdom	4,352	Sunk
25 March 1917	Immacolata	Italy	137	Sunk
5 June 1917	Kallundborg	United Kingdom	1,590	Sunk
6 June 1917	Oriana	Argentina	1,015	Sunk
7 June 1917	Mama Filomena	Italy	148	Sunk
9 June 1917	Fert	Italy	5,567	Sunk
9 June 1917	Gratangen	Norway	2,484	Sunk
12 June 1917	Moreni	United States	4,045	Sunk
19 June 1917	La Giuseppina	Italy	28	Sunk
19 June 1917	Nuovo Mondo Carmelo	Italy	25	Sunk
12 September 1917	Gisla	Norway	2,118	Sunk
12 September 1917	Urd	United Kingdom	3,049	Sunk
12 September 1917	Wilmore	United States	5,395	Sunk
14 September 1917	Amiral De Kersaint	France	5,570	Sunk
14 September 1917	Ausonia	Italy	1,438	Sunk
14 September 1917	Chulmleigh	United Kingdom	4,911	Sunk
19 October 1917	War Clover	United Kingdom	5,174	Sunk
25 October 1917	Erviken	Norway	2,134	Sunk
25 October 1917	Ness	United Kingdom	3,050	Sunk
25 October 1917	Sheaf Blade	United Kingdom	2,378	Sunk
26 October 1917	Le Tarn	France	1,658	Sunk
28 October 1917	Ferrona	United Kingdom	4,591	Sunk
9 December 1917	Adour	Norway	1,940	Sunk
10 December 1917	Crathorne	Norway	2,619	Sunk
10 December 1917	Owasco	United States	4,630	Sunk
11 December 1917	D. A. Gordon	United Kingdom	2,301	Sunk
11 December 1917	Minorca	United Kingdom	1,145	Sunk
14 December 1917	Coila	United Kingdom	4,135	Sunk
30 January 1918	Minnetonka	United Kingdom	13,528	Sunk
4 February 1918	Participation	Italy	2,438	Sunk
5 February 1918	Caprera	Italy	1,875	Sunk
6 February 1918	Duca Di Genova	Italy	7,893	Sunk
7 February 1918	Montenegro	France	1,306	Damaged
8 February 1918	Agnese Madre	Italy	235	Sunk
8 February 1918	Emma Felice	Italy	128	Sunk
17 June 1918	Kandy	United Kingdom	4,921	Damaged

== Bibliography ==
- Amos, Jonathan (19 February 2009). "Danton wreck found in deep water". BBC News.
- Gröner, Erich; Jung, Dieter; Maass, Martin (1991). U-boats and Mine Warfare Vessels. German Warships 1815–1945. Vol. 2. Translated by Thomas, Keith; Magowan, Rachel. London: Conway Maritime Press. ISBN 0-85177-593-4.
