= List of shipwrecks in June 1917 =

The list of shipwrecks in June 1917 includes ships sunk, foundered, grounded, or otherwise lost during June 1917.

== 1 June ==
List of shipwrecks: 1 June 1917
Ship	State	Description
Cavina	United Kingdom	World War I: The cargo ship was torpedoed and sunk in the Atlantic Ocean 45 nautical miles (83 km) west by south of the Fastnet Rock (50°56′N 10°35′W) by SM U-88 (Imperial German Navy). Her crew survived.
Domenico Miscuraca	Italy	World War I: The barquentine was shelled and sunk in the Mediterranean Sea west of Sicily (37°38′N 12°07′E) by SM UC-25 (Imperial German Navy).
Teal	United Kingdom	World War I: The trawler was shelled and sunk in the Atlantic Ocean 57 nautical miles (106 km) north west by north of Skule Skerry (59°13′N 4°16′W) by SM U-57 (Imperial German Navy). Her crew survived.
Vittoria	Italy	World War I: The brigantine was shelled and sunk in the Mediterranean Sea west of Sicily (37°05′N 12°07′E) by SM UC-25 (Imperial German Navy).

== 2 June ==
List of shipwrecks: 2 June 1917
Ship	State	Description
Cameronian	United Kingdom	World War I: The cargo ship was torpedoed and sunk in the Mediterranean Sea 50 nautical miles (93 km) north west by north of Alexandria, Egypt (31°53′N 29°19′E) by SM UC-34 (Imperial German Navy) with the loss of 42 lives (or 43 lost - 11 crew + 32 soldiers).
Eliofilo	Italy	World War I: The cargo ship was sunk in the Atlantic Ocean off Ouessant, Finistère, France (48°27′N 8°31′W) by SM U-87 (Imperial German Navy). Her crew survived.
Ereaga	Spain	World War I: The cargo ship was torpedoed and sunk in the Bay of Biscay off Mimizan, Landes, France by SM UC-72 (Imperial German Navy). Her crew survived.
Harfursfjord	Norway	World War I: The cargo ship was sunk in the Atlantic Ocean south of Iceland (60°25′N 16°20′W) by SM U-155 (Imperial German Navy). Her crew survived.
Prudence	United Kingdom	World War I: The fishing smack was shelled and sunk in the Atlantic Ocean 15 nautical miles (28 km) west south west of the Eddystone Lighthouse by SM UB-23 (Imperial German Navy). Her crew survived.
Shamrock	United Kingdom	World War I: The trawler was shelled and sunk in the Atlantic Ocean 66 nautical miles (122 km) north east of Sule Skerry by SM U-96 (Imperial German Navy). Her crew survived.
Skarpsno	Norway	World War I: The cargo ship was sunk in the Bay of Biscay (44°18′N 3°50′W) by SM UC-72 (Imperial German Navy) with the loss of seventeen of her crew.
St. Bernard	United Kingdom	World War I: The trawler was shelled and sunk in the Atlantic Ocean 65 nautical miles (120 km) north by west of Noup Head, Orkney Islands by SM U-96 (Imperial German Navy). Her crew survived.
St. Sunniva	Norway	World War I: The cargo ship struck a mine and sank in the Bay of Biscay off Saint-Jean-de-Luz, Basses-Pyrénées, France (43°26′N 1°41′W) with the loss of four of her crew.
Wairuna	United Kingdom	World War I: The cargo ship was scuttled in the Pacific Ocean off Raoul Island, New Zealand by SMS Wolf (Imperial German Navy).

== 3 June ==
List of shipwrecks: 3 June 1917
Ship	State	Description
Elisabeth	France	World War I: The barque was scuttled in the English Channel 20 nautical miles (37 km) south of The Lizard, Cornwall, United Kingdom (49°45′N 5°05′W) by SM UC-29 (Imperial German Navy). Her crew survived.
HMT George V	Royal Navy	The naval trawler was lost on this date.
Giralda	United Kingdom	World War I: The fishing smack struck a mine and sank in the North Sea. Her crew survived.
Greenbank	United Kingdom	World War I: The cargo ship was torpedoed and sunk in the Mediterranean Sea 12 nautical miles (22 km) north of Cape Falcon, Algeria (36°05′N 1°04′W) by SM U-33 (Imperial German Navy) with the loss of a crew member.
Hollington	United Kingdom	World War I: The cargo ship was torpedoed and sunk in the Atlantic Ocean 14 nautical miles (26 km) south of the Faroe Islands by SM U-95 (Imperial German Navy) with the loss of 30 of her crew.
Islandmore	United Kingdom	World War I: The collier was shelled and sunk in the Mediterranean Sea 20 nautical miles (37 km) north west of Cape Falcon (35°52′N 1°09′W) by SM U-33 (Imperial German Navy) with the loss of two crew.
Manin B.	Italy	World War I: The barque was scuttled in the Mediterranean Sea 54 nautical miles (100 km) off Cabo Creux (42°19′N 4°28′E) by SM U-72 (Imperial German Navy).
Merioneth	United Kingdom	World War I: The cargo ship was shelled and sunk in the Norwegian Sea 105 nautical miles (194 km) west by north of Tromsø, Norway (71°20′N 16°20′E) by SM U-28 (Imperial German Navy). Her crew survived.
Petronella Madre	Italy	World War I: The sailing vessel was sunk in the Strait of Sicily by SM U-39 (Imperial German Navy).
Portofino	Italy	World War I: The cargo ship was sunk in the Atlantic Ocean 3 nautical miles (5.6 km) east by north of the Pendeen Lighthouse, Cornwall by SM UC-66 (Imperial German Navy) with the loss of three of her crew.
Rosario	Uruguay	World War I: The barque was scuttled in the Bay of Biscay 80 nautical miles (150 km) off the mouth of the Gironde by SM UC-72 (Imperial German Navy).
Sten II	Russia	World War I: The coaster was scuttled in the Gulf of Bothnia by SM UC-58 (Imperial German Navy).
Virgilia	United Kingdom	World War I: The trawler was scuttled in the North Sea 5 nautical miles (9.3 km) east of Girdle Ness, Aberdeenshire (57°10′N 1°51′W) by SM UC-77 (Imperial German Navy). Her crew survived, but her captain was taken as a prisoner of war.
Vulcanus	France	World War I: The cargo ship was sunk in the Mediterranean Sea off Cape Rizzutto, Italy (37°47′N 17°47′E) by SM U-47 (Imperial German Navy). Her crew survived.

== 4 June ==
List of shipwrecks: 4 June 1917
Ship	State	Description
Algol	Russia	World War I: The cargo ship was sunk in the Barents Sea 70 nautical miles (130 km) north of the North Cape, Norway (71°30′N 26°00′E) by SM U-28 (Imperial German Navy).
City of Baroda	United Kingdom	World War I: The cargo ship was torpedoed and sunk in the Atlantic Ocean 90 nautical miles (170 km) north west by west of Tory Island, County Donegal (56°00′N 10°20′W) by SM UC-53 (Imperial German Navy). Her crew survived.
Clara	Sweden	World War I: The barque was scuttled in the North Sea 70 nautical miles (130 km) north of Foula, Shetland Islands, United Kingdom by SM UC-55 (Imperial German Navy). Her crew survived.
Juno	Norway	World War I: The barque was shelled and sunk in the North Sea north east of the Shetland Islands, United Kingdom 60°30′N 0°45′W) by SM U-43 (Imperial German Navy). Her crew survived.
SMS M23	Imperial German Navy	World War I: The M1-class minesweeper was sunk by mines in the North Sea.
Manchester Trader	United Kingdom	The cargo ship was shelled and sunk in the Mediterranean Sea 8 nautical miles (15 km) off Pantelleria, Italy (36°58′N 12°36′E) by SM U-65 (Imperial German Navy) with the loss of a crew member. One of the survivors was taken as a prisoner of war.
Orion	Denmark	World War I: The cargo ship was sunk in the Atlantic Ocean north of the Shetland Islands, United Kingdom (62°14′N 1°02′E) by SM U-71 (Imperial German Navy). Her crew survived.
Phemius	United Kingdom	World War I: The cargo ship was torpedoed and sunk in the Atlantic Ocean 80 nautical miles (150 km) north west of Eagle Island, County Mayo (54°56′N 12°07′W by SM UC-45 (Imperial German Navy). Her crew survived.
HMT Southland	United Kingdom	World War I: The troopship was torpedoed and sunk in the Atlantic Ocean 140 nautical miles (260 km) off Tory Island, County Donegal (56°10′N 12°14′W)by SM U-70 (Imperial German Navy) with the loss of 4 lives.
Songelv	Norway	World War I: The full-rigged ship was sunk in the Atlantic Ocean 80 to 90 nautical miles (150 to 170 km) south west by west of the Bishop Rock, Isles of Scilly, United Kingdom by SM UC-29 (Imperial German Navy). Her crew survived.
SMS Wildfang	Austro-Hungarian Navy	World War I: The Huszár-class destroyer struck a mine and sank in the Adriatic Sea off Brijuni.

== 5 June ==
List of shipwrecks: 5 June 1917
Ship	State	Description
Alaska	Norway	World War I: The fishing vessel was sunk in the Barents Sea 30 nautical miles (56 km) north east of Vardø, Finnmark (71°25′N 35°49′E) by SM U-28 (Imperial German Navy).
Amor	Italy	World War I: The cargo ship was sunk in the Atlantic Ocean 200 nautical miles (370 km) north west of the Fastnet Rock (52°44′N 13°42′W) by SM U-66 (Imperial German Navy).
C. Thorén	Sweden	World War I: The barquentine was sunk in the North Sea (61°13′N 2°43′E) by SM U-71 (Imperial German Navy). Her crew survived.
Duen	Norway	World War I: The fishing vessel was sunk in the Barents Sea north of Vardø by SM U-28 (Imperial German Navy).
Götha	Sweden	World War I: The barquentine was sunk in the North Sea (61°13′N 2°43′E) by SM U-71 (Imperial German Navy). Her crew survived.
Laura Ann	United Kingdom	World War I: The schooner was shelled and sunk in the English Channel 20 nautical miles (37 km) south south east of Beachy Head, Sussex by SM UB-23 (Imperial German Navy) with the loss of a crew member.
Kallundborg	United Kingdom	World War I: The cargo ship was scuttled in the Mediterranean Sea 80 nautical miles (150 km) south south west of Toulon, Var, France (42°58′N 5°38′E) by SM U-64 (Imperial German Navy) with the loss of a crew member.
Manchester Miller	United Kingdom	World War I: The cargo ship was torpedoed and sunk in the Atlantic Ocean 190 nautical miles (350 km) north west of the Fastnet Rock (52°49′N 14°07′W) by SM U-66 (Imperial German Navy) with the loss of eight crew.
SMS S20	Imperial German Navy	World War I: The S13-class torpedo boat was sunk in the North Sea off the coast of Belgium by HMS Canterbury and HMS Conquest (Royal Navy).
SMS Senator Predohl	Imperial German Navy	The Vorpostenboot was lost on this date.
Sydkap	Norway	World War I: The fishing vessel was sunk in the Barents Sea north north east of Vardø (71°52′N 35°49′E) by SM U-28 (Imperial German Navy).

== 6 June ==
List of shipwrecks: 6 June 1917
Ship	State	Description
Anton	Sweden	World War I: The cargo ship was sunk in the North Sea (56°45′N 1°05′W) by SM UC-77 (Imperial German Navy). Two casualties were reported.
Cornelia	Netherlands	World War I: The schooner was sunk in the English Channel west of Jersey, Channel Islands (49°10′N 2°40′W) by SM UB-18 (Imperial German Navy).
Diane	France	World War I: The coaster was sunk in the Mediterranean Sea off Oran, Algeria (37°19′N 11°42′E) by SM U-39 (Imperial German Navy). Her crew survived.
Edvard	Sweden	World War I: The sailing vessel was scuttled in the Baltic Sea off Rauma, Finland by SM UC-58 (Imperial German Navy). Her crew survived.
Elianna	Sweden	World War I: The sailing vessel was scuttled in the Baltic Sea off Rauma by SM UC-58 (Imperial German Navy). Her crew survived.
Eemdijk	Netherlands	World War I: The cargo ship was sunk in the Atlantic Ocean north of the Shetland Islands, United Kingdom (61°40′N 1°40′W) by SM U-88 (Imperial German Navy). Her crew survived.
Harald Klitgaard	Denmark	World War I: The cargo ship was torpedoed and sunk in the North Sea 28 nautical miles (52 km) north of the Farne Islands, Northumberland, United Kingdom by SM UC-77 (Imperial German Navy) with the loss of a crew member.
Isabella J. Boyce	United States	The sandsucker grounded, caught fire and sank on Middle Bass Island in Lake Erie, Ontario, Canada. No lives were lost.
Oriana	Argentina	World War I: The sailing vessel was scuttled in the Mediterranean Sea 2 nautical miles (3.7 km) south east of Cap Camarat, Var, France (42°42′N 6°45′E) by SM U-64 (Imperial German Navy). Her crew survived; they were rescued by the tug Indefatiguable (France).
Parthenia	United Kingdom	World War I: The cargo ship was torpedoed and sunk in the Atlantic Ocean 49°28′N 9°15′W) by SM U-69 (Imperial German Navy) with the loss of three crew.
Saint Eloi	France	World War I: The cargo ship was sunk in the Bay of Biscay off the Île d'Yeu, Vendée by SM UC-72 (Imperial German Navy).
S.N.A. 2	France	World War I: The cargo ship was sunk in the North Sea 10 nautical miles (19 km) north east of Scarborough, Yorkshire by SM UB-21 (Imperial German Navy).

== 7 June ==
List of shipwrecks: 7 June 1917
Ship	State	Description
Cranmore	United Kingdom	World War I: The cargo ship was torpedoed and damaged in the Atlantic Ocean 150 nautical miles (280 km) north west of the Fastnet Rock (52°46′N 14°24′W) by SM U-66 (Imperial German Navy). She was beached but was later refloated.
Errington Court	United Kingdom	World War I: The cargo ship struck a mine in the Mediterranean Sea off Port-la-Nouvelle, Aude, France and was beached. She was later refloated.
Golden Hope	United Kingdom	World War I: The drifter was scuttled in the North Sea 30 nautical miles (56 km) east of Kinnaird Head, Aberdeenshire by SM UC-45 (Imperial German Navy). Her crew survived.
Hafnia	Denmark	World War I: The cargo ship was sunk in the Bay of Biscay south west of the Cordouan Lighthouse, Gironde, France (45°24′N 1°15′W) by SM UC-21 (Imperial German Navy). Her crew survived.
Il Dionisio	Italy	World War I: The sailing vessel was sunk in the Strait of Sicily by SM U-33 (Imperial German Navy).
Ikalis	United Kingdom	World War I: The cargo ship was torpedoed and sunk in the Atlantic Ocean 170 nautical miles (310 km) north west of the Fastnet Rock (52°19′N 13°57′W) by SM U-66 (Imperial German Navy). Her crew survived.
John Bakke	Norway	World War I: The cargo ship was sunk in the North Sea east of the Shetland Islands, United Kingdom by SM U-88 (Imperial German Navy). Her crew survived.
Jonathan Holt	United Kingdom	World War I: The cargo ship was torpedoed and sunk in the Atlantic Ocean 130 nautical miles (240 km) north west by west of the Fastnet Rock by SM U-54 (Imperial German Navy). Her crew survived.
Liliana	Italy	World War I: The sailing vessel was scuttled in the Mediterranean Sea off Alexandria, Egypt (32°43′N 31°40′E) by SM UC-34 (Imperial German Navy).
Mahopac	United Kingdom	World War I: The cargo ship was torpedoed and damaged in the English Channel (50°44′N 0°12′W) by SM UB-40 (Imperial German Navy). She was beached but was later refloated.
Mama Filomena	Italy	World War I: The brigantine was shelled and sunk in the Gulf of Lion (42°04′N 3°55′E) by SM U-64 (Imperial German Navy).
Rosa M.	Italy	World War I: The sailing vessel was sunk in the Mediterranean Sea (37°50′N 15°53′E) by SM U-65 (Imperial German Navy).
San Antonio	Italy	World War I: The sailing vessel was sunk in the Strait of Sicily by SM U-33 (Imperial German Navy).
Sir Francis	United Kingdom	World War I: The cargo ship was torpedoed and sunk in the North Sea 2 nautical miles (3.7 km) north east of Scarborough, Yorkshire (54°19′N 0°22′W) by SM UB-21 (Imperial German Navy) with the loss of ten of her crew.
SM UC-29	Imperial German Navy	World War I: The Type UC II submarine was shelled and sunk by Q-ship HMS Pargust (Royal Navy), which it had attacked. Twenty-three of her 25 crew were killed.
Wilhelm	United Kingdom	World War I: The schooner was shelled and sunk in the English Channel 20 nautical miles (37 km) south east by south of The Lizard, Cornwall (49°46′N 4°46′W) by SM UC-75 (Imperial German Navy). Her crew survived.
Yuba	Norway	World War I: The barque was shelled and sunk in the Atlantic Ocean by SM U-50 (Imperial German Navy). Her crew survived.

== 8 June ==
List of shipwrecks: 8 June 1917
Ship	State	Description
AG-15	Imperial Russian Navy	The American Holland-class submarine sank off Öland, Sweden due to a hatch being left open when she dived. At least two of her fifteen crew died; there were at least eight survivors. She was raised on 16 June by the rescue vessel Volkhov (Russia) and taken in to Reval. Subsequently repaired and returned to service.
Cariad	United Kingdom	World War I: The fishing vessel was scuttled in the English Channel 6 nautical miles (11 km) east by south of Start Point, Devon by SM UB-18 (Imperial German Navy). Her crew survived.
Cheltonian	United Kingdom	World War I: The cargo ship was shelled and sunk in the Mediterranean Sea 54 nautical miles (100 km) west by south of the Planier Lighthouse, Bouches-du-Rhône, France (42°46′N 4°40′E) by SM U-72 (Imperial German Navy). Her crew survived, but two of them were taken as prisoners of war.
Enidwen	United Kingdom	World War I: The cargo ship was torpedoed and sunk in the Atlantic Ocean 170 nautical miles (310 km) west north west of the Fastnet Rock (53°09′N 13°53′W) by SM U-69 (Imperial German Navy). Her crew survived.
Felicina	Italy	World War I: The sailing vessel was sunk in the Gulf of Lion (42°57′N 4°38′E) by SM U-72 (Imperial German Navy).
Huntstrick	United Kingdom	World War I: The troopship was torpedoed and sunk in the Atlantic Ocean 80 nautical miles (150 km) west north west of Cape Spartel, Morocco (35°52′N 6°47′W) by SM U-39 (Imperial German Navy) with the loss of fifteen lives.
Isle of Jura	United Kingdom	World War I: The cargo ship was scuttled in the Atlantic Ocean 15 nautical miles (28 km) west south west of Cape Spartel (35°44′N 6°25′W) by SM U-39 (Imperial German Navy) with the loss of two crew.
SMS M47	Imperial German Navy	World War I: The Type 1915 minesweeper struck a mine and sank in the North Sea.
HMML 540 and HMML 541	Royal Navy	World War I: The motor launches were lost when Huntstrick (United Kingdom) was sunk by SM U-39 (Imperial German Navy).
Ocean's Pride	United Kingdom	World War I: The fishin vessel was scuttled in the English Channel 9 nautical miles (17 km) east by south of Start Point by SM UB-18 (Imperial German Navy). Her crew survived.
Onward	United Kingdom	World War I: The fishing vessel was scuttled in the English Channel 9 nautical miles (17 km) east of Start Point by SM UB-18 (Imperial German Navy). Her crew survived.
Orator	United Kingdom	World War I: The cargo liner was torpedoed and sunk in the Atlantic Ocean 85 nautical miles (157 km) west north west of the Fastnet Rock (51°02′N 11°45′W) by SM U-96 (Imperial German Navy) with the loss of five of her crew.
Phantom	United Kingdom	World War I: The brig was shelled and sunk in the English Channel 25 nautical miles (46 km) north north west of Cap La Heve, Seine-Inférieure, France by SM UB-40 (Imperial German Navy) with the loss of three of her crew.
Saragossa	United Kingdom	World War I: The cargo ship was torpedoed and sunk in the Atlantic Ocean 178 nautical miles (330 km) north west of the Fastnet Rock by SM U-69 (Imperial German Navy). Her crew survived.
Sequana	France	World War I: The troopship was torpedoed and sunk in the Bay of Biscay 5 nautical miles (9.3 km) south east of the Pointe des Corbeaux, Île d'Yeu, Vendée (46°36′N 2°18′W) by SM UC-72 (Imperial German Navy) with the loss of 207 of the 665 people on board.
Sverre II	Norway	World War I: The fishing vessel was sunk in the Barents Sea north east of Vardø, Finnmark (71°00′N 36°00′E) by SM U-28 (Imperial German Navy).
Torbay Lass	United Kingdom	World War I: The fishing vessel was scuttled in the English Channel 9 nautical miles (17 km) east of Start Point by SM UB-18 (Imperial German Navy). Her crew survived.
Valdieri	Italy	World War I: The cargo ship was torpedoed and sunk in the Atlantic Ocean 50 nautical miles (93 km) west north west of Cape Spartel (35°46′N 6°52′W) by SM U-39 (Imperial German Navy).
Vinaes	Norway	World War I: The cargo ship was sunk in the English Channel 15 nautical miles (28 km) east north east of Barfleur, Manche, France by SM UB-32 (Imperial German Navy) with the loss of nine of her crew.

== 9 June ==
List of shipwrecks: 9 June 1917
Ship	State	Description
Achilles	United Kingdom	World War I: The coaster was shelled and sunk in the Atlantic Ocean 75 nautical miles (139 km) south west by west of the Fastnet Rock (51°10′N 10°15′W) by SM U-55 and SM U-95 (both Imperial German Navy). Her crew survived, but two of them were taken as prisoners of war.
Ada	Sweden	World War I: The cargo ship was torpedoed and sunk in the North Sea 20 nautical miles (37 km) east of Aberdeen, United Kingdom by SM U-61 (Imperial German Navy) with the loss of three crew.
Amphitrite	Portugal	World War I: The sailing vessel was scuttled in the Atlantic Ocean 40 nautical miles (74 km) off Cape Prior, Spain by SM UC-48 (Imperial German Navy).
Appledore	United Kingdom	World War I: The cargo ship was torpedoed and sunk in the Atlantic Ocean 165 nautical miles (306 km) north west by west of the Fastnet Rock (48°42′N 8°46′W) by SM U-70 (Imperial German Navy). Her crew survived.
Baron Cawdor	United Kingdom	World War I: The cargo ship was torpedoed and sunk in the Atlantic Ocean 150 nautical miles (280 km) south west by south of the Fastnet Rock by SM U-96 (Imperial German Navy) with the loss of three of her crew.
Bravore	Norway	World War I: The cargo ship was sunk in the Mediterranean Sea 70 nautical miles (130 km) off Toulon, Var, France (42°05′N 5°10′E) by SM U-72 (Imperial German Navy). Her crew survived.
Dana	Denmark	World War I: The cargo ship was torpedoed and sunk in the North Sea 42 nautical miles (78 km) south of Lerwick, Shetland Islands, United Kingdom by SM U-61 (Imperial German Navy) with the loss of four crew.
Deveron	Norway	World War I: The barque was torpedoed and sunk in the Atlantic Ocean 25 nautical miles (46 km) north north east of North Rona, United Kingdom by SM U-94 (Imperial German Navy) with the loss of four of her crew.
Egyptiana	United Kingdom	World War I: The cargo ship was torpedoed and sunk in the Atlantic Ocean 120 nautical miles (220 km) west south west of the Isles of Scilly by SM U-70 (Imperial German Navy). Her crew survived.
Eugene Mathilde	France	World War I: The fishing vessel was sunk in the English Channel off the coast of Seine-Inférieure by SM UB-40 (Imperial German Navy).
Fert	Italy	The cargo ship was sunk in the Mediterranean Sea 0.75 nautical miles (1.39 km) off Cape Tortosa, Spain (40°36′N 0°55′E) by SM U-64 (Imperial German Navy).
François Georgette	France	The fishing vessel was sunk in the English Channel off the coast of Seine-Inférieure by SM UB-40 (Imperial German Navy).
General Laurie	United Kingdom	World War I: The schooner was set afire and scuttled in the Mediterranean Sea 75 nautical miles (139 km) west by south of Marseille, Var (42°09′N 5°00′E) by SM U-72 (Imperial German Navy). Her crew survived.
Gratangen	Norway	World War I: The cargo ship was sunk in the Mediterranean Sea 6 nautical miles (11 km) off Cape Torotsa (40°44′N 1°02′E) by SM U-64 (Imperial German Navy). Her crew survived.
Harbury	United Kingdom	World War I: The cargo ship was torpedoed and sunk in the Atlantic Ocean 170 nautical miles (310 km) west north west of Ouessant, Finistère, France (47°47′N 9°16′W) by SM U-70 (Imperial German Navy) with the loss of twelve crew.
Lilly	Denmark	World War I: The cargo ship was scuttled in the Atlantic Ocean 3 nautical miles (5.6 km) off the Montedor Lighthouse, Portugal (41°40′N 9°45′W) by SM UC-53 (Imperial German Navy). Her crew survived.
Ludwig	Sweden	World War I: The sailing vessel was sunk in the Baltic Sea 25 nautical miles (46 km) north of Oerker by SM UC-57 (Imperial German Navy).
Marjorie	United Kingdom	World War I: The auxiliary ketch was scuttled in the English Channel 30 nautical miles (56 km) south east by south of The Lizard, Cornwall (49°36′N 4°41′W) by SM UB-18 (Imperial German Navy). Her crew survived.
Montebello	Italy	World War I: The cargo ship was sunk in the Gulf of Lion (42°03′N 5°10′E) by SM U-72 (Imperial German Navy). Her crew survived.
Roland	France	World War I: The barque was sunk in the Ionian Sea 30 nautical miles (56 km) west south west of Cythera, Greece (35°50′N 22°01′E) by SM U-27 (Austro-Hungarian Navy).
Tordenvore	Norway	World War I: The cargo ship was sunk in the Atlantic Ocean south west of Cape Finisterre, Spain (42°30′N 9°08′W) by SM UC-53 (Imperial German Navy). Her crew survived.

== 10 June ==
List of shipwrecks: 10 June 1917
Ship	State	Description
Annam	France	World War I: The cargo liner was sunk in the Ionian Sea 20 nautical miles (37 km) south of Sapientza, Greece (36°49′N 21°23′E) by SM UC-35 (Imperial German Navy).
August	Sweden	World War I: The ketch was sunk in the Baltic Sea 7 nautical miles (13 km) off the Unterstens Lighthouse by SM UC-58 (Imperial German Navy). Her crew survived.
Bay State	United Kingdom	World War I: The cargo ship was torpedoed and sunk in the Atlantic Ocean 250 nautical miles (460 km) north west of the Fastnet Rock (53°00′N 16°09′W) by SM U-66 (Imperial German Navy). Her crew survived.
Betty	Russia	World War I: The cargo ship was sunk in the Atlantic Ocean 45 nautical miles (83 km) north west of North Rona, United Kingdom (59°30′N 6°15′W) by SM U-61 (Imperial German Navy).
Clan Alpine	United Kingdom	World War I: The cargo ship was torpedoed and sunk in the Atlantic Ocean 40 nautical miles (74 km) north by east of Muckle Flugga, Shetland Islands by SM U-60 (Imperial German Navy) with the loss of eight crew.
Dulwich	United Kingdom	World War I: The cargo ship struck a mine laid by the submarine SM UB-12 (Imperial German Navy) and sank in the North Sea 7 nautical miles (13 km) north by east of the Shipwash Lightship (United Kingdom) (52°08′N 1°45′E) with the loss of five of her crew.
Galicia	United Kingdom	World War I: The cargo ship was torpedoed and sunk in the Atlantic Ocean 140 nautical miles (260 km) south west by south of the Fastnet Rock (48°55′N 10°00′W) by SM U-70 (Imperial German Navy) with the loss of four crew.
HMS Grafton	Royal Navy	World War I: The Edgar-class cruiser was torpedoed and damaged in the Mediterranean Sea 150 nautical miles (280 km) east of Malta by SM UB-43 (Imperial German Navy).
Haulwen	United Kingdom	World War I: The cargo ship was torpedoed and sunk in the Atlantic Ocean 250 nautical miles (460 km) north west of the Fastnet Rock (52°48′N 16°00′W) by SM U-43 (Imperial German Navy) with the loss of four crew.
Henri Jeanne	France	World War I: The fishing vessel was sunk in the English Channel off the coast of Seine-Inférieure by SM UB-40 (Imperial German Navy).
Jupiter I	French Navy	World War I: The naval trawler struck a mine and sank in the English Channel off Calais, Pas-de-Calais (50°59′N 1°47′E) with the loss of ten of her crew.
Kleopatra	Greece	World War I: The sailing vessel was sunk in the Doro Channel by SM UC-23 (Imperial German Navy).
Madeleine	France	World War I: The fishing vessel was scuttled in the English Channel off Le Havre, Seine-Inférieure by SM UB-40 (Imperial German Navy).
Marie Elsie	United Kingdom	World War I: The cargo ship was torpedoed and sunk in the Barents Sea 125 nautical miles (232 km) north west of Cape Teriberski, Russia (71°21′N 34°16′E) by SM U-28 (Imperial German Navy) with the loss of three of her crew.
Perla	United Kingdom	World War I: The cargo ship was sunk in the Barents Sea 130 nautical miles (240 km) west by north of Cape Teriberski (71°23′N 35°26′E) by SM U-28 (Imperial German Navy) with the loss of four crew.
Petrolite	United States	World War I: The tanker was torpedoed and sunk in the Atlantic Ocean 185 nautical miles (343 km) west of Cape Spartel, Morocco (35°03′N 9°13′W) by SM U-39 (Imperial German Navy). Her crew survived.
Ribera	United Kingdom	World War I: The cargo ship was torpedoed and sunk in the Atlantic Ocean 70 nautical miles (130 km) north of Cape Wrath, Sutherland by SM U-61 (Imperial German Navy). Her crew survived.
Santa Maria	Portugal	World War I: The three-masted schooner was scuttled in the Atlantic Ocean 6 nautical miles (11 km) south of the Berlingas (39°11′N 9°35′W) by SM UC-53 (Imperial German Navy).
Scottish Hero	Canada	World War I: The cargo ship was shelled and sunk in the Atlantic Ocean 440 nautical miles (810 km) west by south of the Fastnet Rock (46°59′N 18°12′W) by SM U-155 (Imperial German Navy) with the loss of a crew member.
Solhaug	Norway	World War I: The cargo ship was sunk in the Cantabrian Sea 5 nautical miles (9.3 km) east by south of Cape Peñas, Spain by SM UC-48 (Imperial German Navy). Her crew survived.
Stylianos	Egypt	World War I: The sailing vessel was sunk in the Mediterranean Sea by SM UC-74 (Imperial German Navy). Her crew survived.
HM Torpedo Boat 117	Royal Navy	The TB 114-class torpedo boat collided with Kamourska (United Kingdom) and sank in the English Channel.

== 11 June ==
List of shipwrecks: 11 June 1917
Ship	State	Description
Anglian	United Kingdom	World War I: The cargo ship was torpedoed and sunk in the Atlantic Ocean 43 nautical miles (80 km) south west by west of the Bishop Rock, Isles of Scilly (49°22′N 7°12′W) by SM UC-75 (Imperial German Navy) with the loss of a crew member.
Benha	United Kingdom	World War I: The cargo ship was scuttled in the Mediterranean Sea 50 nautical miles (93 km) north east of Marsa Susa, Libya (33°45′N 24°10′E) by SM UC-74 (Imperial German Navy). Her crew survived.
Breid	Norway	World War I: The cargo ship was sunk in the North Sea 10 nautical miles (19 km) east by south of Noss, Caithness, United Kingdom by SM UC-41 (Imperial German Navy). Her crew survived.
City of Perth	United Kingdom	World War I: The cargo ship was torpedoed and sunk in the Atlantic Ocean 195 nautical miles (361 km) south south west of the Fastnet Rock (48°06′N 10°30′W) by SM U-70 (Imperial German Navy) with the loss of eight of her crew.
Huntsholm	United Kingdom	World War I: The cargo ship was torpedoed and sunk in the English Channel 4 nautical miles (7.4 km) east by south of the Owers Lightship (United Kingdom) by SM UB-40 (Imperial German Navy). Her crew survived.
L'vitsa	Imperial Russian Navy	World War I: The Bars-class submarine was sunk in the Baltic Sea, probably by a mine.
Mar Cor	Italy	World War I: The cargo ship was sunk in the Atlantic Ocean west of the Bishop Rock by SM UB-32 (Imperial German Navy). Her crew survived.
Sibens	Russia	World War I: The sailing vessel was scuttled in the Atlantic Ocean off the Santa Maria Lighthouse, Portugal (36°52′N 8°08′W) by SM UC-53 (Imperial German Navy).
Sigrun	Norway	World War I: The cargo ship was sunk in the Atlantic Ocean 180 nautical miles (330 km) west of the Fastnet Rock by SM U-50 (Imperial German Navy). Her crew survived.
Teviotdale	United Kingdom	World War I: The cargo ship was torpedoed and sunk in the Atlantic Ocean 330 nautical miles (610 km) north west by west of the Fastnet Rock (52°20′N 18°27′W by SM U-43 (Imperial German Navy) with the loss of a crew member.
Wera	Russia	World War I: The sailing vessel was scuttled in the Atlantic Ocean 100 nautical miles (190 km) off Cádiz, Spain (35°11′N 8°11′W) by SM U-39 (Imperial German Navy).
HMS Zylpha	Royal Navy	World War I: The Q-ship was torpedoed and damaged in the Atlantic Ocean south west of Ireland (51°20′N 11°00′W) by SM U-82 (Imperial German Navy) with the loss of a crew member. She was taken under tow but sank on 15 June.

== 12 June ==
List of shipwrecks: 12 June 1917
Ship	State	Description
Alexandre	France	World War I: The barque was set afire and sunk in the English Channel off Fécamp, Seine-Inférieure by SM UC-69 (Imperial German Navy).
Alfred	United Kingdom	World War I: The schooner was scuttled in the English Channel off Boulogne, Pas-de-Calais, France by SM UB-40 (Imperial German Navy). Her crew survived.
Alwyn	United Kingdom	World War I: The ketch was scuttled in the North Sea 5 nautical miles (9.3 km) south east of Girdleness, Aberdeenshire (57°05′N 1°55′W) by SM UB-41 (Imperial German Navy). Her crew survived.
Amakura	United Kingdom	World War I: The cargo ship was torpedoed and sunk in the Atlantic Ocean 180 nautical miles (330 km) north west of Tory Island, County Donegal by SM U-94 (Imperial German Navy) with the loss of two of her crew.
HMT Carew Castle	Royal Navy	World War I: The naval trawler struck a mine and sank in the Bristol Channel off Hartland Point, Devon (50°58′N 4°36′W) with the loss of three of her crew.
Elevera	United States	The motor vessel was wrecked in fog on Cape Cleare (59°47′N 147°54′W) on Montague Island off the south-central coast of the Territory of Alaska. Her crew of two survived.
Eugene F. Moran	Canada	The cargo ship sank outside the entrance to St. John's, Newfoundland.
Gaita	Russia	World War I: The sailing vessel was scuttled in the Atlantic Ocean 40 nautical miles (74 km) off Cape Spartel, Morocco (35°55′N 6°52′W) by SM U-39 (Imperial German Navy).
Moreni	United States	World War I: The tanker was shelled and sunk in the Mediterranean Sea 17 nautical miles (31 km) south east of Tabarca, Spain (37°52′N 0°14′E) by SM U-64 (Imperial German Navy) with the loss of four crew.
Premier	United Kingdom	The tug broke in two at Halifax, Nova Scotia, and was a total loss.
Polyxena	United Kingdom	World War I: The cargo ship was torpedoed and sunk in the Atlantic Ocean 57 nautical miles (106 km) west of the Fastnet Rock (51°06′N 11°05′W) by SM U-95 (Imperial German Navy) with the loss of seven of her crew.
Symra	Norway	World War I: The cargo ship was sunk in the Atlantic Ocean 5 nautical miles (9.3 km) south west of Huelva, Portugal by SM UC-53 (Imperial German Navy). Her crew survived.
South Point	United Kingdom	World War I: The cargo ship was torpedoed and sunk in the Atlantic Ocean 30 nautical miles (56 km) south west of the Bishop Rock, Isles of Scilly (49°43′N 7°00′W) by SM UB-32 (Imperial German Navy). Her crew survived.
Unknown submarine	Unknown	World War I: A submarine was shelled and sunk by Meaford (Canada) in a gun battle in the Mediterranean Sea.

== 13 June ==
List of shipwrecks: 13 June 1917
Ship	State	Description
Aghios Nicolaos	Greece	World War I: The sailing vessel was sunk in the Aegean Sea west of Icaria by SM UC-23 (Imperial German Navy).
Biagio	Italy	World War I: The sailing vessel was scuttled in the Mediterranean Sea off Cape Camaret, France (43°19′N 6°59′E) by SM U-72 (Imperial German Navy).
Candace	Norway	World War I: The barque was sunk in the North Sea 50 nautical miles (93 km) south west of Utsira, Rogaland by SM U-62 (Imperial German Navy). Her crew survived.
Cederic	Norway	World War I: The cargo ship was torpedoed and sunk in the Atlantic Ocean north west of Tory Island, County Donegal, United Kingdom (55°22′N 12°03′W) by SM U-94 (Imperial German Navy). Her crew survived.
Darius	United Kingdom	World War I: The cargo ship was torpedoed and sunk in the Atlantic Ocean 210 nautical miles (390 km) south west of the Fastnet Rock by SM U-54 (Imperial German Navy) with the loss of fifteen crew.
Ernestine	France	World War I: The schooner was sunk in the Bay of Biscay 6 nautical miles (11 km) west north west of Cap Ferret, Gironde by SM UC-48 (Imperial German Navy).
Eugene F. Moran	United Kingdom	The tug foundered 1 nautical mile (1.9 km) off St. John's, Newfoundland.
Kelvinbank	United Kingdom	World War I: The cargo ship was torpedoed and sunk in the Atlantic Ocean 100 nautical miles (190 km) north of Cape Wrath, Sutherland by SM U-69 (Imperial German Navy) with the loss of sixteen of her crew.
Manchuria	United States	The passenger-cargo ship collided with the monitor USS Amphitrite (United States Navy) in New York Harbor. After her crew abandoned ship and were rescued by two section patrol boats (both United States Navy) and a motor sailer (flag unknown), Manchuria was towed and beached off Tompkinsville, Staten Island, New York. She was refloated, repaired, and returned to service.
USS McCulloch	United States Navy	USS McCulloch sinking. The patrol vessel, a former cutter (United States Navy), collided with the passenger steamer Governor (United States) in dense fog and sank in the Pacific Ocean 3 nautical miles (5.6 km) northwest of Point Conception, California. Governor rescued all 90 members of McCulloch's crew, but one of them died three days later.
Santo	Italy	World War I: The barque was shelled and sunk in the Mediterranean Sea off Cape Camarat, France by SM U-72 (Imperial German Navy). Her crew survived.
Silverburn	United Kingdom	World War I: The coaster was shelled and sunk in the North Sea 4 nautical miles (7.4 km) south of Aberdeen (57°04′N 1°54′W) by SM UB-41 (Imperial German Navy). Her crew survived.
St. Andrews	United Kingdom	World War I: The cargo ship was torpedoed and sunk in the Mediterranean Sea 4 nautical miles (7.4 km) west of Cape Spartivento, (Not Sardinia) Calabria, Italy by SM UC-38 (Imperial German Navy) with the loss of three of her crew.
Storegut	Norway	World War I: The four-masted barque was shelled and sunk in the Atlantic Ocean 235 nautical miles (435 km) south west of Land's End, Cornwall, United Kingdom (48°23′N 10°28′W) by SM U-82 (Imperial German Navy). Her crew survived.
Sylvia	Norway	World War I: The sailing vessel was sunk in the North Sea 70 nautical miles (130 km) west of Olmestad by SM U-62 (Imperial German Navy). Her crew survived.

== 14 June ==
List of shipwrecks: 14 June 1917
Ship	State	Description
Angantyr	Denmark	World War I: The cargo ship was sunk in the North Sea south east of Aberdeen, United Kingdom by SM UB-41 (Imperial German Navy) with the loss of a crew member.
HMS Avenger	Royal Navy	World War I: The armed merchant cruiser was sunk in the Atlantic Ocean west of the Shetland Islands (60°22′N 4°35′W) by SM U-69 (Imperial German Navy) with the loss of a crew member.
Aysgarth	United Kingdom	World War I: The cargo ship was scuttled in the Atlantic Ocean 430 nautical miles (800 km) west north west of Cape Finisterre, Spain (42°50′N 18°52′W) by SM U-155 (Imperial German Navy) with the loss of three of her crew.
Carthaginian	United Kingdom	World War I: The cargo ship struck a mine, placed by SM U-79, and sank in the Atlantic Ocean 2.5 nautical miles (4.6 km) north west of the Inishtrahull Lighthouse, County Donegal (55°28′00″N 7°21′30″W). Her crew survived, they were rescued by a Royal Navy destroyer.
Cedarbank	Norway	World War I: The four-masted barque was torpedoed and sunk in the North Sea (60°22′N 2°45′E by SM U-100 (Imperial German Navy) with the loss of all 26 crew.
Dart	United Kingdom	World War I: The cargo ship was torpedoed and sunk in the Atlantic Ocean 6 nautical miles (11 km) south south west of the Ballycottin Lighthouse, County Cork by SM UC-47 (Imperial German Navy) with the loss of four of her crew.
Hasting	Sweden	World War I: The coaster was sunk in the Atlantic Ocean south of Ouessant, Finistère, France (48°18′N 5°37′W) by SM UC-69 (Imperial German Navy). Her crew survived.
Highbury	United Kingdom	World War I: The cargo ship was sunk in the Atlantic Ocean 100 nautical miles (190 km) west south west of the Bishop Rock, Isles of Scilly (48°25′N 10°28′W) by SM U-82 (Imperial German Navy) with the loss of all 40 crew.
Kankakee	United Kingdom	World War I: The cargo ship was torpedoed and sunk in the Irish Sea by a Luftstreitkräfte aircraft.
New Zealand Transport	United Kingdom	World War I: The collier was torpedoed and sunk in the Aegean Sea 8 nautical miles (15 km) south east of Serphopulo Island, Greece by SM UC-23 (Imperial German Navy) with the loss of three of her crew.
Nirefs	Greece	World War I: The cargo ship struck a mine and sank in the Atlantic Ocean 1.5 nautical miles (2.8 km) off the La Vielle Lighthouse, Ouessant.
Ortolan	United Kingdom	World War I: The cargo ship was torpedoed and sunk in the Atlantic Ocean 100 nautical miles (190 km) west south west of the Bishop Rock (48°09′N 9°45′W) by SM U-82 (Imperial German Navy) with the loss of three of her crew.
Perfect	Norway	World War I: The sailing vessel was sunk in the North Sea east of the Shetland Islands (60°58′N 2°18′E) by SM U-66 (Imperial German Navy). Her crew survived.
Vigoureuse	France	World War I: The schooner was scuttled in the English Channel 20 nautical miles (37 km) north of the Casquets, Channel Islands by SM UB-32 (Imperial German Navy). Her crew survived.
Wega	United Kingdom	World War I: The cargo ship was torpedoed and sunk in the English Channel 20 nautical miles (37 km) west by south of the Royal Sovereign Lightship (United Kingdom) by SM UC-71 (Imperial German Navy) with the loss of five of her crew.

== 15 June ==
List of shipwrecks: 15 June 1917
Ship	State	Description
A. B. Johnson	United States	World War I: The schooner was burned after being captured the day before by SMS Seeadler (Imperial German Navy).
Addah	United Kingdom	World War I: The Elder Dempster 4,397 GRT cargo/passenger ship was torpedoed and sunk in the Bay of Biscay 35 nautical miles (65 km) south west of Penmarc'h, Finistère, France (47°24′N 5°00′W) by SM UC-69 (Imperial German Navy) with the loss of nine of her crew, whilst en route from Montreal to Cherbourg. The sinking is notable because when the submarine surfaced Oberleutnant zur See, Erwin Waßner ordered firing on Addah's captain's boat, hereby killing eight men. The master's boat's stern was blown off, but the U-boat continued firing at the swimming men as their lifeboat was sinking. The chief officer's lifeboat was also targeted and again some men were wounded badly. When the U-boat finally disappeared, the captain and others made it for the second lifeboat.
Albertine Beatrice	Netherlands	World War I: The barque was shelled and sunk in the Atlantic Ocean 200 nautical miles (370 km) south west of the Fastnet Rock (48°02′N 10°57′W) by SM U-82 (Imperial German Navy).
Assunzione	Italy	World War I: The cargo ship struck a mine and sank in the Mediterranean Sea east of Bône, Algeria (37°00′N 8°00′E). Her crew survived.
Clio	Sweden	World War I: The sailing vessel struck a mine and sank in the Baltic Sea off Vaasa, Finland.
Espinho	Portugal	World War I: The coaster was torpedoed, shelled and sunk in the Atlantic Ocean (37°34′N 9°06′W) by SM U-39 (Imperial German Navy). Her crew survived.
Eugène et Eugènie	France	World War I: The sailing vessel was scuttled in the Loire Estuary by SM UC-48 (Imperial German Navy). Her crew survived.
Kristianiafjord	Norway	The passenger ship was wrecked off Cape Race, Newfoundland. All 1,144 passengers and crew were rescued.
Marion	United States	The motor boat sank just after leaving dock at Bath, North Carolina due to overloading. Four passengers died.
USS Olympia	United States Navy	The protected cruiser ran aground in Long Island Sound off Block Island. Her crew were taken off. She was later refloated, repaired and returned to service.
Pasha	United Kingdom	World War I: The cargo ship was torpedoed and sunk in the Strait of Messina (37°52′N 15°27′E) by SM UC-38 (Imperial German Navy) with the loss of three of her crew.
Teesdale	United Kingdom	World War I: The cargo ship was damaged in the English Channel 2 nautical miles (3.7 km) off Bolt Head, Devon by SM UB-31 (Imperial German Navy) with the loss of three of her crew. She was later refloated.
HMT Towhee	Royal Navy	The naval trawler sank in the English Channel.
Wapello	United Kingdom	World War I: The tanker was torpedoed and sunk in the English Channel 14 nautical miles (26 km) west south west of the Owers Lightship (United Kingdom) (50°30′N 0°57′W) by SM UC-71 (Imperial German Navy) with the loss of two of her crew.
Westonby	United Kingdom	World War I: The cargo ship was torpedoed and sunk in the Atlantic Ocean 195 nautical miles (361 km) south west by south of the Fastnet Rock by SM U-82 (Imperial German Navy). Her crew survived.

== 16 June ==
List of shipwrecks: 16 June 1917
Ship	State	Description
Carrie Hervey	United Kingdom	World War I: The schooner was shelled and sunk in the Atlantic Ocean 52 nautical miles (96 km) south east by south of the Armen Rock (47°16′N 4°03′W) by SM U-50 (Imperial German Navy). Her crew survived.
Emsli	Tunisia	World War I: The sailing vessel was sunk in the Gulf of Gabès by SM UC-27 (Imperial German Navy).
Esperanza	Spain	World War I: The sailing vessel was sunk in the Mediterranean Sea off Algiers, Algeria by SM UC-53 (Imperial German Navy).
Fallodon	United Kingdom	World War I: The cargo ship was torpedoed and damaged in the Atlantic Ocean off Mine Head, County Cork by SM U-61 (Imperial German Navy). She was beached but was later refloated, repaired and returned to service.
Inge	Denmark	World War I: The three-masted schooner was scuttled in the North Sea 175 nautical miles (324 km) off Hanstholm (56°21′N 3°09′E) by SM UB-22 (Imperial German Navy). Her crew survived.
Jessie	United Kingdom	World War I: The cargo ship was torpedoed and sunk in the Atlantic Ocean 260 nautical miles (480 km) west of the Bishop Rock, Isles of Scilly by SM U-82 (Imperial German Navy). Her crew survived.
John D. Archbold	United States	World War I: The tanker was torpedoed and sunk in the Atlantic Ocean 85 nautical miles (157 km) south west of Penmarc'h, Finistère, France (47°47′N 6°01′W by SM UC-48 (Imperial German Navy) with the loss of three of her crew.
Kamouma	Tunisia	World War I: The sailing vessel was sunk in the Gulf of Gabès by SM UC-27 (Imperial German Navy).
Kibira	Tunisia	World War I: The sailing vessel was sunk in the Gulf of Gabès by SM UC-27 (Imperial German Navy).
Kornsø	Denmark	World War I: The auxiliary schooner was shelled and sunk in the Atlantic Ocean north west of the Orkney Islands, United Kingdom by SM U-62 (Imperial German Navy). Her crew survived.
La Tour d'Agon	France	World War I: The sailing vessel was scuttled in the Bay of Biscay 35 nautical miles (65 km) off the La Coubre Lighthouse by SM UC-69 (Imperial German Navy).
Liberté	Tunisia	World War I: The sailing vessel was sunk in the Gulf of Gabès by SM UC-27 (Imperial German Navy).
Metlaoni	Tunisia	World War I: The sailing vessel was sunk in the Gulf of Gabès by SM UC-27 (Imperial German Navy).
Roald Amundsen	Norway	World War I: The cargo ship struck a mine and was damaged in the North Sea 0.3 nautical miles (560 m) west of the Tongue Lightship (United Kingdom) with the loss of three of her crew. She was beached but was later refloated, repaired and returned to service.
Unkai Maru No. 7	Japan	World War I: The steamer was sunk by a mine in the Arabian Sea south west of Bombay, India (18°33′N 72°10′E).

== 17 June ==
List of shipwrecks: 17 June 1917
Ship	State	Description
Aghios Georgios	Greece	World War I: The sailing vessel was sunk in the Mediterranean Sea 30 nautical miles (56 km) west of Malta (35°37′N 13°49′E) by SM UC-22 (Imperial German Navy).
Anjou	French Navy	World War I: The auxiliary minesweeper struck a mine and sank in the Adour at Bayonne, Basses-Pyrénées (43°35′N 1°32′W). Her crew survived.
Antonios M. Mavrogordatos	Greece	World War I: The cargo ship was torpedoed and sunk in the Atlantic Ocean 7 nautical miles (13 km) south of the Wolf Rock, Cornwall, United Kingdom (49°55′N 5°59′W) by SM UC-48 (Imperial German Navy).
Argentina	Italy	World War I: The sailing vessel was sunk in the Gulf of Gabès off Djerba, Tunisia by SM UC-27 (Imperial German Navy).
Bell Angelina	Italy	World War I: The fishing vessel was sunk in the Gulf of Gabès by SM UC-27 (Imperial German Navy).
Fornebo	United Kingdom	World War I: the tanker was torpedoed and sunk in the Atlantic Ocean 4 nautical miles (7.4 km) north of Cape Wrath, Sutherland by SM U-78 (Imperial German Navy). Her crew survived.
HMT Fraser	Royal Navy	World War I: The naval trawler struck a mine and sank in the English Channel off Boulogne, Pas-de-Calais, France with the loss of twelve of her crew.
Giuseppe S.	Italy	World War I: The fishing vessel was sunk in the Gulf of Gabès by SM UC-27 (Imperial German Navy).
Gunhild	Denmark	World War I: The coaster was torpedoed and sunk in the North Sea 22 nautical miles (41 km) off Holmengrå, Vestland, Norway (60°45′N 4°19′E) by SM U-100 (Imperial German Navy) with the loss of six of her crew.
Lizzie Westoll	United Kingdom	World War I: The cargo ship was torpedoed and sunk in the Atlantic Ocean 120 nautical miles (220 km) north west by west of the Fastnet Rock (51°39′N 12°44′W) by SM UC-42 (Imperial German Navy). Her crew survived.
Luigina	Italy	World War I: The fishing vessel was sunk in the Gulf of Gabès by SM UC-27 (Imperial German Navy).
Nostra Madre	Italy	World War I: The barque was shelled and sunk in the Atlantic Ocean 70 nautical miles (130 km) east of the Fastnet Rock by SM U-60 (Imperial German Navy).
Raloo	United Kingdom	World War I: The cargo ship was torpedoed and sunk in St. George's Channel 6 nautical miles (11 km) south east by east of the Coningbeg Lightship (United Kingdom) by SM U-61 (Imperial German Navy) with the loss of three crew.
San Antonio V	Italy	World War I: The fishing vessel was sunk in the Gulf of Gabès by SM UC-27 (Imperial German Navy).
Stanhope	United Kingdom	World War I: The cargo ship was torpedoed and sunk in the English Channel 7 nautical miles (13 km) south west by west of Start Point, Devon (50°08′N 3°45′W) by SM UB-31 (Imperial German Navy) with the loss of 22 of her crew.
HMS Tartar	Royal Navy	World War I: The Tribal-class destroyer struck a mine and was damaged in the English Channel off Boulogne with the loss of 45 of her crew.
Tosto	Norway	World War I: The cargo ship struck a mine and sank off Noup Head, Westray, Orkney Islands, United Kingdom. Her crew survived.
Wairuna	New Zealand	World War I: The cargo ship was captured by SMS Wolf (Imperial German Navy) on 2 June off Sunday Island. She was scuttled on 17 June, a day after leaving the island.

== 18 June ==
List of shipwrecks: 18 June 1917
Ship	State	Description
HMT Bega	Royal Navy	World War I: The 129.9-foot (39.6 m), 318-ton patrol naval trawler was torpedoed and sunk in the Atlantic Ocean 40 nautical miles (74 km) north of Muckle Flugga, Shetland Islands (61°36′N 0°35′W) by SM U-58 (Imperial German Navy) with the loss of seven crew.
Bettina	Italy	World War I: The brigantine was sunk in the Gulf of Gabès off Sfax, Tunisia (35°17′N 11°10′E) by SM UC-27 (Imperial German Navy).
Bianca B	Italy	World War I: The brig was sunk in the Gulf of Gabès off Sfax (35°18′N 11°19′E) by SM UC-27 (Imperial German Navy).
HMT Borneo	Royal Navy	World War I: The naval trawler struck a mine and sank in the English Channel off Beachy Head, Sussex (50°40′N 0°12′E) with the loss of eleven of her crew.
Dorte Jensen	Denmark	World War I: The cargo ship struck a mine and sank in the North Sea off the Tongue Lightship (United Kingdom) (51°29′N 1°23′E). Her crew survived.
Elele	United Kingdom	World War I: The cargo ship was torpedoed and sunk in the Atlantic Ocean 300 nautical miles (560 km) west north west of the Fastnet Rock (52°20′N 17°30′W) by SM U-24 (Imperial German Navy). Her crew survived.
English Monarch	United Kingdom	World War I: The cargo ship was torpedoed and sunk in the Atlantic Ocean 300 nautical miles (560 km) west north west of the Fastnet Rock (52°20′N 17°30′W) by SM U-24 (Imperial German Navy) with the loss of three crew.
Gauntlet	United Kingdom	World War I: The ketch was scuttled in the English Channel 30 nautical miles (56 km) north west of the Les Hanois Lighthouse, Guernsey, Channel Islands by SM UC-65 (Imperial German Navy). Her crew survived.
Kangaroo	United Kingdom	World War I: The schooner was shelled and sunk in the Atlantic Ocean 20 nautical miles (37 km) south of the Tuskar Rock, Ireland (51°53′N 6°24′W) by SM UC-51 (Imperial German Navy) with the loss of four of her crew .
Letizia G.	Italy	World War I: The sailing vessel was sunk in the Gulf of Gabès off Sfax by SM UC-27 (Imperial German Navy).
SMS M9	Imperial German Navy	World War I: The M1-class minesweeper was sunk by mines in the North Sea.
Marietta B.	Italy	World War I: The sailing vessel was sunk in the Gulf of Gabès off Sfax by SM UC-27 (Imperial German Navy).
Pannomitis	Greece	World War I: The sailing vessel was sunk in the Aegean Sea by SM UC-23 (Imperial German Navy).
Paolina Aida	Italy	World War I: The sailing vessel was sunk in the Gulf of Gabès off Sfax (35°17′N 11°10′E) by SM UC-27 (Imperial German Navy).
Queen Adelaide	United Kingdom	World War I: The cargo ship was torpedoed and sunk in the Atlantic Ocean 13 nautical miles (24 km) north north east of St. Kilda, Inverness-shire (58°04′N 8°35′W) by SM U-70 (Imperial German Navy) with the loss of three crew.
R. C. Slade	United States	World War I:The schooner was scuttled in the Pacific Ocean by SMS Seeadler (Imperial German Navy).
S. L. Clark	United States	The canal boat sank near Westerly, Rhode Island.
Seaconnet	United States	World War I: The cargo ship struck a mine and sank in the North Sea 10 nautical miles (19 km) east of Scroby Sands, Norfolk (52°26′N 2°00′E). Her crew survived.
Thistledhu	United Kingdom	World War I: The cargo ship was torpedoed and sunk in the Atlantic Ocean 218 nautical miles (404 km) north west of the Fastnet Rock by SM U-82 (Imperial German Navy) with the loss of four of her crew.
Tyne	United Kingdom	World War I: The cargo ship was torpedoed and sunk in the Atlantic Ocean 18 nautical miles (33 km) south west of The Lizard, Cornwall (49°42′N 5°25′W) by SM UC-48 (Imperial German Navy). Her crew survived.
Væring	Denmark	World War I: The cargo ship was torpedoed and sunk in the English Channel 14 nautical miles (26 km) north of the Stiff Lighthouse, Ouessant, Finistère, France by SM UC-65 (Imperial German Navy) with the loss of a crew member.
Violet	United Kingdom	World War I: The barquentine was shelled and sunk in the Irish Sea 10 nautical miles (19 km) south south east of the Coningbeg Lightship (United Kingdom) (51°57′N 6°24′W) by SM UC-51 (Imperial German Navy). Her crew survived.
Waitotara	NZ	The 4,717 grt cargo ship was abandoned on fire about 240 mi (390 km) south of Nouméa on 17 June and probably sank on the 18th. She was steaming from San Francisco to Sydney. It was thought the fire started in a cargo of copra, but she was also carrying oil and paper. The crew of 40 were rescued by a French ship. Ships sent to salvage her could find no trace.
Xiphias	Greece	World War I: The passenger ship was sunk in the Aegean Sea off Mykonos by SM UC-23 (Imperial German Navy).

== 19 June ==
List of shipwrecks: 19 June 1917
Ship	State	Description
Amalia	Italy	World War I: The sailing vessel was sunk in the Mediterranean Sea off Pantelleria by SM UC-27 (Imperial German Navy).
Antonio Balbi	Italy	World War I: The sailing vessel was sunk in the Mediterranean Sea off Pantelleria by SM UC-27 (Imperial German Navy).
Ariane	French Navy	World War I: The Amphitrite-class submarine was torpedoed and sunk in the Mediterranean Sea off Bizerta, Tunisia, by the submarine SM UC-22 (Imperial German Navy).
Batoum	United Kingdom	World War I: The tanker was torpedoed and sunk in the Atlantic Ocean 6 nautical miles (11 km) south of the Fastnet Rock by SM U-61 (Imperial German Navy). with the loss of a crew member.
Bearn	France	World War I: The cargo ship was sunk in the Bay of Biscay 8 nautical miles (15 km) north of Tapia de Casariego, Asturias, Spain by SM UC-69 (Imperial German Navy). Her crew survived.
Brookby	United Kingdom	World War I: The cargo ship was scuttled in the Atlantic Ocean 155 nautical miles (287 km) south of the Fastnet Rock by SM U-60 (Imperial German Navy). Her crew survived.
Buffalo	United Kingdom	World War I: The cargo ship was torpedoed and sunk in the Atlantic Ocean 80 nautical miles (150 km) north west by north of Cape Wrath, Sutherland (59°34′N 7°30′W) by SM U-70 (Imperial German Navy). Her crew survived.
HM CMB-1	Royal Navy	World War I: The Coastal Motor Boat was shelled and sunk in the North Sea off Zeebrugge, West Flanders, Belgium by an Imperial German Navy destroyer with the loss of a crew member. Survivors were taken as prisoners of war.
Domenico Madre	Italy	World War I: The sailing vessel was sunk in the Mediterranean Sea off Pantelleria by SM UC-27 (Imperial German Navy).
Ivigtut	Denmark	World War I: The auxiliary barque was sunk in the North Sea north east of the Shetland Islands, United Kingdom (61°47′N 0°03′W) by SM U-58 (Imperial German Navy). Her crew survived.
Jakobus	Greece	World War I: The sailing vessel was sunk in the Aegean Sea by SM UC-23 (Imperial German Navy).
Kate and Anne	United Kingdom	World War I: The ketch was scuttled in the English Channel 25 nautical miles (46 km) north west by west of the Les Hanois Lighthouse, Guernsey, Channel Islands by SM UC-17 (Imperial German Navy). Her crew survived.
Kelso	United Kingdom	World War I: The cargo ship was torpedoed and sunk in the Atlantic Ocean 33 nautical miles (61 km) west south west of the Bishop Rock, Isles of Scilly by SM UC-75 (Imperial German Navy). Her crew survived.
Kyma	Greece	World War I: The cargo ship was sunk in the Atlantic Ocean off the coast of Morocco (34°34′N 6°42′W) by SM U-39 (Imperial German Navy). Her crew survived.
La Giuseppina	Italy	World War I: The sailing vessel was sunk in the Strait of Sicily by SM U-64 (Imperial German Navy).
La Michelina	Italy	World War I: The sailing vessel was sunk in the Mediterranean Sea off Pantelleria by SM UC-27 (Imperial German Navy).
Louise	Norway	World War I: The barque was sunk in the North Sea 135 nautical miles (250 km) east north east of Hook Point, Hartlepool, County Durham, United Kingdom (56°14′N 2°29′E) by SM U-93 (Imperial German Navy). Her crew survived.
Maria	Greece	World War I: The sailing vessel was sunk in the Aegean Sea by SM UC-23 (Imperial German Navy).
Mistica Rosa	Italy	World War I: The sailing vessel was sunk in the Mediterranean Sea off Pantelleria by SM UC-27 (Imperial German Navy).
Natironco	Canada	The steamer was damaged in a collision with Eastern States (United States) in the Detroit River and was beached on the Canadian side of the river. She was raised 5 October 1917 and taken to Toledo Shipbuilding Company, Toledo, Ohio, where she was repaired.
Nuovo Mondo Carmelo	Italy	World War I: The sailing vessel was sunk in the Strait of Sicily by SM U-64 (Imperial German Navy).
Raffaelo	Italy	World War I: The sailing vessel was sunk in the Mediterranean Sea off Pantelleria by SM UC-27 (Imperial German Navy).
Raxiarchos	Greece	World War I: The sailing vessel was sunk in the Aegean Sea by SM UC-23 (Imperial German Navy).
Rosinella	Italy	World War I: The sailing vessel was sunk in the Mediterranean Sea off Pantelleria by SM UC-27 (Imperial German Navy).
San Antonio	Italy	World War I: The sailing vessel was sunk in the Mediterranean Sea off Pantelleria by SM UC-27 (Imperial German Navy).
San Giovanni Batista	Italy	World War I: The sailing vessel was sunk in the Mediterranean Sea off Pantelleria by SM UC-27 (Imperial German Navy). Her crew survived.
Spind	Norway	World War I: The cargo ship was sunk in the Bay of Biscay 2 nautical miles (3.7 km) west by south of Cape Busto, Spain by SM UC-69 (Imperial German Navy). Her crew survived.
S. Vincenzo Ferrari P.	Italy	World War I: The sailing vessel was sunk in the Mediterranean Sea off Pantelleria by SM UC-27 (Imperial German Navy).
Tunisie	France	World War I: The cargo ship was sunk in the Atlantic Ocean west of Ireland (52°10′N 16°00′W by SM U-43 (Imperial German Navy) with the loss of all 31 crew.

== 20 June ==
List of shipwrecks: 20 June 1917
Ship	State	Description
Bengore Head	United Kingdom	World War I: The cargo ship was torpedoed and sunk in the Atlantic Ocean 150 nautical miles (280 km) north west of the Fastnet Rock (52°19′N 13°39′W) by SM U-62 (Imperial German Navy). Her crew survived.
Benita	United Kingdom	World War I: The schooner was shelled and sunk in the English Channel 15 nautical miles (28 km) south of Portland Bill, Dorset by SM UC-75 (Imperial German Navy). Her crew survived.
Bidartaise	France	World War I: The vessel was sunk in the English Channel 15 nautical miles (28 km) south of Portland Bill by SM UC-75 (Imperial German Navy).
Eli Lindoe	Norway	World War I: The cargo ship was sunk in the Atlantic Ocean off the coast of Morocco by SM U-39 (Imperial German Navy). Her crew survived.
Fido	Norway	World War I: The barque was captured and scuttled in the North Sea south south west of Utsire, Rogaland by SM U-19 (Imperial German Navy). Her crew survived.
USS Gypsy	United States Navy	The patrol boat was destroyed by fire at Boston, Massachusetts whilst under conversion for navy use.
Katerina	Greece	World War I: The cargo ship was sunk in the Bay of Biscay (43°48′N 7°43′W) by SM UC-69 (Imperial German Navy).
Ruperra	United Kingdom	World War I: The cargo ship was torpedoed and sunk in the Mediterranean Sea 50 nautical miles (93 km) east by south of Pantelleria, Italy by SM UC-27 (Imperial German Navy). Her crew survived.
HMS Salvia	Royal Navy	World War I: The Aubrietia-class sloop, operating as a Q-ship, was sunk in the Atlantic Ocean west of Ireland (52°25′N 16°20′W) by SM U-94 (Imperial German Navy) with the loss of five of her crew. Her captain was taken as a prisoner of war.

== 21 June ==
List of shipwrecks: 21 June 1917
Ship	State	Description
Black Head	United Kingdom	World War I: The cargo ship was torpedoed and sunk in the North Sea 52 nautical miles (96 km) east south east of the Out Skerries, Shetland Islands (60°22′N 1°00′E) by SM U-19 (Imperial German Navy). Her crew survived.
Childe Harold	United States	World War I: The schooner was shelled and sunk in the Atlantic Ocean off Ouessant, Finistère, France (47°50′N 7°50′W) by SM UC-17 (Imperial German Navy). Her crew survived.
E. T. Nygaard	Denmark	World War I: The cargo ship was scuttled in the Atlantic Ocean 2 nautical miles (3.7 km) off Cape Ortegal, Spain (43°44′N 8°02′W) by SM UC-69 (Imperial German Navy). Her crew survived.
Hendrika	Netherlands	World War I: The fishing vessel was sunk in the North Sea off Callantsoog, North Holland by SM UC-64 (Imperial German Navy). Her crew survived.
Laatefos	Norway	World War I: The cargo ship was torpedoed and sunk in the North Sea west of Lerwick, Shetland by SM U-19 (Imperial German Navy). Her crew survived.
Lord Roberts	United Kingdom	World War I: The cargo ship was shelled and sunk in the Atlantic Ocean 270 nautical miles (500 km) north west by north of the Fastnet Rock (51°38′N 15°58′W) by SM U-62 (Imperial German Navy). Her crew survived.
Ortona	United Kingdom	World War I: The cargo ship was torpedoed and sunk in the Atlantic Ocean 140 nautical miles (260 km) south west of the Fastnet Rock by SM U-50 (Imperial German Navy) with the loss of a crew member.
Scheria	Italy	World War I: The cargo ship was sunk in the Atlantic Ocean 140 nautical miles (260 km) west south west of Ouessant by SM UC-17 (Imperial German Navy).

== 22 June ==
List of shipwrecks: 22 June 1917
Ship	State	Description
Bolette	Norway	World War I: The cargo ship was sunk in the North Sea 95 nautical miles (176 km) west of Feie by SM U-19 (Imperial German Navy) with the loss of five of her crew.
HSwMS Claes Uggla	Swedish Navy	HSwMS Claes Uggla The cruiser ran aground and sank.
Himalaya	France	World War I: The passenger ship was sunk in the Mediterranean Sea 38°03′N 11°31′E) by SM U-63 (Imperial German Navy) with the loss of 28 of the 204 people on board.
Maggie	Norway	World War I: The cargo ship was sunk in the Atlantic Ocean 70 nautical miles (130 km) north west of Ireland by SM U-79 (Imperial German Navy). Her crew survived.
Melford Hall	United Kingdom	World War I: The cargo ship was torpedoed and sunk in the Atlantic Ocean 95 nautical miles (176 km) west of Tory Island, County Donegal (56°34′N 10°41′W) by SM U-100 (Imperial German Navy). Her crew survived.
Miami	United Kingdom	World War I: The cargo ship was torpedoed and sunk in the Atlantic Ocean 11 nautical miles (20 km) east south east of the Fastnet Rock (51°21′N 9°19′W) by SM UC-51 (Imperial German Navy). Her crew survived.
Toro	Uruguay	World War I: The cargo ship was sunk in the Atlantic Ocean off the coast of Morocco (35°38′N 7°26′W) by SM U-39 (Imperial German Navy).
Winslow	United States	World War I: The schooner was scuttled by shelling and then was burned after being captured on 16 June off Raoul Island, Kermadec Islands in the Pacific Ocean by SMS Wolf (Imperial German Navy).

== 23 June ==
List of shipwrecks: 23 June 1917
Ship	State	Description
HMT Corientes	Royal Navy	World War I: The naval trawler struck a mine and sank in the Atlantic Ocean 4 nautical miles (7.4 km) north east of Malin Head, County Donegal (55°27′N 7°24′W) with the loss of thirteen crew.
Craonne	France	World War I: The cargo ship was shelled and sunk in the Mediterranean Sea south west of Sicily, Italy (38°06′N 5°49′E) by SM U-63 (Imperial German Navy) with the loss of a crew member.
Isère	France	World War I: The cargo ship was sunk in the Atlantic Ocean 70 nautical miles (130 km) west of Cape Spartel, Morocco (35°36′N 6°58′W) by SM U-39 (Imperial German Navy). Her crew survived.
Jules	France	World War I: The sailing vessel struck a mine and sank in the Gulf of Gabès off Sfax, Tunisia.
Kalypso Vergotti	Greece	World War I: The cargo ship was sunk in the Mediterranean Sea 70 nautical miles (130 km) north west of Cape Bougaroni, Algeria (37°55′N 5°21′E) by SM U-63 (Imperial German Navy).
Mongolia	United Kingdom	World War I: The passenger ship struck a mine and sank in the Indian Ocean off Bombay, India with the loss of fourteen lives.
Sophie	Denmark	World War I: The three-masted schooner was sunk in the Atlantic Ocean north of the Shetland Islands, United Kingdom by SM U-55 (Imperial German Navy). Her crew survived.
Star	Denmark	World War I: The three-masted schooner was sunk in the Atlantic Ocean north of the Shetland Islands by SM U-55 (Imperial German Navy). Her crew survived.

== 24 June ==
List of shipwrecks: 24 June 1917
Ship	State	Description
Aghia Paraskevi	Greece	World War I: The cargo ship was sunk in the Mediterranean Sea 23 nautical miles (43 km) off Cap Ferrat, Alpes-Maritimes, France by SM UC-65 (Imperial German Navy).
Cabo Verde	Portugal	World War I: The cargo ship was sunk in the Atlantic Ocean off Cape Vilano, Spain by SM UC-69 (Imperial German Navy). Her crew survived.
Cestrian	United Kingdom	World War I: The troopship was sunk by torpedo in the Aegean Sea 4 nautical miles (7.4 km) south east of Skyros, Greece by SM UB-42 (Imperial German Navy) with the loss of three lives.
Clan Davidson	United Kingdom	World War I: The cargo ship was torpedoed and sunk in the Atlantic Ocean 130 nautical miles (240 km) south west by west of the Isles of Scilly (48°16′N 8°36′W) by SM UC-17 (Imperial German Navy) with the loss of twelve of her crew.
Constantinos	Greece	World War I: The cargo ship was sunk in the Mediterranean Sea 25 nautical miles (46 km) off Cap Ferrat by SM UC-65 (Imperial German Navy). Her crew survived.
Crown of Arragon	United Kingdom	World War I: The cargo ship was torpedoed and sunk in the Atlantic Ocean 124 nautical miles (230 km) south west of the Isles of Scilly (48°10′N 8°14′W) by SM UC-17 (Imperial German Navy) with the loss of a crew member.
Helma	Norway	World War I: The cargo ship was sunk in the Atlantic Ocean 110 nautical miles (200 km) north of Cape Vilano, Spain (45°47′N 9°55′W) by SM UC-69 (Imperial German Navy). Her crew survived.
Hilversum	Netherlands	World War I: The cargo ship was torpedoed and sunk in the Bristol Channel 4.5 nautical miles (8.3 km) south south west of Lundy Island, Devon, United Kingdom by SM UC-51 (Imperial German Navy). Her crew survived.
HMS Kempton	Royal Navy	While rescuing the survivors of HMS Redcar (Royal Navy), the Racecourse-class minesweeper struck a mine and sank in the North Sea off Gravelines, Pas-de-Calais, France (51°03′N 2°07′E) with the loss of three of her crew.
Kong Haakon	Norway	World War I: The cargo ship was sunk in the Mediterranean Sea 23 nautical miles (43 km) off Cap Ferrat by SM UC-65 (Imperial German Navy) with the loss of nineteen of her crew.
HMS Redcar	Royal Navy	World War I: The Racecourse-class minesweeper struck a mine and sank in the North Sea off Gravelines (51°03′30″N 2°07′40″E) with the loss of seven of her crew.
South Wales	United Kingdom	World War I: The cargo ship was torpedoed and sunk in the Atlantic Ocean 128 nautical miles (237 km) west of the Bishop Rock, Isles of Scilly by SM U-62 (Imperial German Navy) with the loss of two crew.
Sylvanian	United Kingdom	World War I: The cargo ship was torpedoed and sunk in the Atlantic Ocean 170 nautical miles (310 km) north west of Tory Island, County Donegal by SM U-94 (Imperial German Navy) with the loss of two of her crew.
Taigetos	Greece	World War I: The cargo ship was sunk in the Mediterranean Sea 25 nautical miles (46 km) off Cap Ferrat by SM UC-65 (Imperial German Navy). Her crew survived.
HMT Taipo	Royal Navy	World War I: The naval trawler struck a mine and sank in the English Channel off Beachy Head, Sussex (50°41′30″N 0°19′00″E) with the loss of five of her crew.
Telegraaf XVIII	Netherlands	World War I: The coaster was sunk in the North Sea west south west of Hook of Holland, South Holland (52°18′N 3°10′E) by SM UC-64 (Imperial German Navy).

== 25 June ==
List of shipwrecks: 25 June 1917
Ship	State	Description
Anatolia	United Kingdom	World War I: The cargo ship struck a mine and sank in the Gulf of Genoa 1.5 nautical miles (2.8 km) off Genoa, Liguria, Italy. Her crew survived.
Galena	United States	World War I: The schooner barge was scuttled in the Atlantic Ocean 70 nautical miles (130 km) west by south of Ouessant, Finistère, France by SM UC-17 (Imperial German Navy). Her crew survived.
HMS Gelsina	Royal Navy	World War I: The naval trawler struck a mine and sank in the North Sea off Aberdeen (57°07′N 1°58′W) with the loss of five of her crew.
Guildhall	United Kingdom	World War I: The cargo ship was torpedoed and sunk in the Atlantic Ocean 40 nautical miles (74 km) south west by west of the Bishop Rock, Isles of Scilly by SM U-62 (Imperial German Navy) with the loss of twelve crew.
Petritzis	Greece	World War I: The cargo ship was torpedoed and sunk in the Bay of Biscay south west of Contis, Landes, France (43°25′N 1°30′W) by SM UC-65 (Imperial German Navy).
Saxon Monarch	United Kingdom	World War I: The cargo ship was torpedoed and sunk in the Atlantic Ocean 140 nautical miles (260 km) south west by west of the Isles of Scilly (48°24′N 7°47′W) by SM UC-17 (Imperial German Navy). Her crew survived.
Southern	United Kingdom	World War I: The cargo ship struck a mine 4 nautical miles (7.4 km) north east of Port-la-Nouvelle, Aude, France and was beached. She was later refloated, repaired and returned to service.

== 26 June ==
List of shipwrecks: 26 June 1917
Ship	State	Description
Birdoswald	United Kingdom	World War I: The cargo ship was torpedoed and sunk in the Mediterranean Sea 25 nautical miles (46 km) east of Tarragona, Catalonia, Spain (41°07′N 1°51′E) by SM U-63 (Imperial German Navy). Her crew survived, but two of them were taken as prisoners of war.
Cattaro	United Kingdom	World War I: The cargo ship was torpedoed and sunk in the Atlantic Ocean 130 nautical miles (240 km) west south west of the Bishop Rock, Isles of Scilly (48°50′N 7°47′W) by SM U-62 (Imperial German Navy). Her crew survived.
HMT Charles Astie	Royal Navy	World War I: The naval trawler struck a mine and sank in Lough Swilly with the loss of all seventeen crew.
SMS G96	Imperial German Navy	World War I: The G96-class torpedo boat struck a mine and sank in the North Sea off the coast of Belgium with the loss of four of her crew.
Georg	Russia	World War I: The sailing vessel was sunk in the Baltic Sea off Rauma, Finland by SM UC-57 (Imperial German Navy).
Haverford	United Kingdom	World War I: The passenger ship was torpedoed and damaged in the Atlantic Ocean (57°01′N 10°59′W) by SM U-94 (Imperial German Navy) with the loss of eight of her crew. She was beached at Kinnegar, County Donegal but was later refloated.
Manistee	United Kingdom	World War I: The cargo ship was torpedoed and sunk in the Atlantic Ocean 86 nautical miles (159 km) west south west of the Bishop Rock (48°57′N 8°08′W) by SM U-62 (Imperial German Navy with the loss of five crew.
Marie	Russia	World War I: The barge was sunk in the Baltic Sea off Rauma by SM UC-57 (Imperial German Navy).
Martinniemi	Russia	World War I: The tug was sunk in the Baltic Sea off Rauma by SM UC-57 (Imperial German Navy).
Serapis	United Kingdom	World War I: The cargo ship was torpedoed and sunk in the Atlantic Ocean 106 nautical miles (196 km) north north west of Tory Island, County Donegal (56°20′N 10°45′W) by SM U-79 (Imperial German Navy) with the loss of nineteen of her 22 crew. Two of the survivors were taken as prisoners of war.
Tervo	Russia	World War I: The barge was sunk in the Baltic Sea off Rauma by SM UC-57 (Imperial German Navy).
Vonin	Denmark	World War I: The schooner was set afire in the Atlantic Ocean west of the Hebrides, United Kingdom by SM U-50 (Imperial German Navy). She was later towed to Londonderry Port but was declared a constructive total loss. Her crew survived.

== 27 June ==
List of shipwrecks: 27 June 1917
Ship	State	Description
Armadale	United Kingdom	World War I: The cargo ship was torpedoed and sunk in the Atlantic Ocean 160 nautical miles (300 km) north west of Tory Island, County Donegal (56°17′N 12°42′W) by SM U-60 (Imperial German Navy) with the loss of three crew.
Baltic	Sweden	World War I: The auxiliary barge was sunk in the North Sea 75 nautical miles (139 km) west of Holmengråa Island, Vestland, Norway by SM U-21 (Imperial German Navy).
Baron Ogilvy	United Kingdom	World War I: The cargo ship was torpedoed and sunk in the Atlantic Ocean 172 nautical miles (319 km) north west of Tory Island by SM U-93 (Imperial German Navy) with the loss of two of her crew.
Doxa	Hellenic Navy	World War I: The Niki-class destroyer was torpedoed and sunk in the Aegean Sea off Milos by SM UB-47 (Imperial German Navy).
Kléber	French Navy	World War I: The Dupleix-class cruiser struck a mine and sank in the Bay of Biscay off Brest, Finistère with the loss of 42 of her crew.
Indrani	United Kingdom	The cargo ship was torpedoed and sunk in the Atlantic Ocean 36 nautical miles (67 km) south west of the Tuskar Rock, Ireland by a Kaiserliche Marine submarine.
Longbenton	United Kingdom	World War I: The collier was torpedoed and sunk in the North Sea 12 nautical miles (22 km) off Flamborough Head, Yorkshire (53°55′N 0°03′W) by SM UC-63 (Imperial German Navy). Her crew survived.
Solway Prince	United Kingdom	World War I: The coaster was scuttled in the English Channel 8 nautical miles (15 km) north of Alderney, Channel Islands by SM UB-40 (Imperial German Navy). Her crew survived.
Tong Hong	United Kingdom	World War I: The cargo ship was sunk in the Mediterranean Sea 55 nautical miles (102 km) south by west of Cape Sicie, Var, France (42°09′N 5°40′E) by SM U-63 (Imperial German Navy). Her crew survived, but her captain was taken as a prisoner of war. The rest of the survivors were rescued by Vega (French Navy).
Ultonia	United Kingdom	World War I: The cargo liner was torpedoed and sunk in the Atlantic Ocean 190 nautical miles (350 km) south west of the Fastnet Rock by SM U-53 (Imperial German Navy) with the loss of a crew member.

== 28 June ==
List of shipwrecks: 28 June 1917
Ship	State	Description
Corona	United Kingdom	World War I: The fishing vessel was shelled and sunk in the North Sea 65 nautical miles (120 km) east of Sumburgh Head, Shetland Islands by SM UC-33 (Imperial German Navy). Her crew survived.
Don Arturo	United Kingdom	World War I: The cargo ship was torpedoed and sunk in the Atlantic Ocean 90 nautical miles (170 km) west south west of the Isles of Scilly by SM UC-62 (Imperial German Navy) with the loss of all 34 crew.
Elsie	United Kingdom	World War I: The fishing vessel was scuttled in the North Sea 10 nautical miles (19 km) north east of Spurn Point, Yorkshire by SM UC-63 (Imperial German Navy). Her crew survived.
Frances	United Kingdom	World War I: The fishing vessel was scuttled in the North Sea 10 nautical miles (19 km) north east of Spurn Point by SM UC-63 (Imperial German Navy). Her crew survived.
Frigate Bird	United Kingdom	World War I: The fishing vessel was sunk in the North Sea 10 nautical miles (19 km) north east of Spurn Point by SM UC-63 (Imperial German Navy) with the loss of all five crew.
Glenelg	United Kingdom	World War I: The fishing vessel was scuttled in the North Sea north east of Spurn Point (53°56′N 1°04′E) by SM UC-63 (Imperial German Navy).
Harbinger	United Kingdom	World War I: The fishing schooner was scuttled in the North Sea off Spurn Point by SM UC-63 (Imperial German Navy). Her crew survived.
Lizzie Ellen	United Kingdom	World War I: The schooner was scuttled in the English Channel 46 nautical miles (85 km) south of Start Point, Devon (49°29′N 3°19′W) by SM UC-65 (Imperial German Navy). Her crew survived.
SMS M63	Imperial German Navy	World War I: The Type 1916 minesweeper struck a mine and sank in the North Sea.
Marguerite	France	World War I: The cargo ship was torpedoed in the English Channel 19 nautical miles (35 km) south west of Portland Bill, Dorset, United Kingdom (50°36′06″N 2°58′39″W) by SM UB-40 (Imperial German Navy).
Marne	France	World War I: The cargo ship was torpedoed and sunk in the Bay of Biscay 5 nautical miles (9.3 km) off the Île d'Yeu, Vendée (46°59′N 2°29′W) by SM UC-71 (Imperial German Navy) with the loss of twelve of her 40 crew. Survivors were rescued by Sauterelle (French Navy).
Minerve	France	World War I: The cargo ship was sunk in the Mediterranean Sea 20 nautical miles (37 km) north of Cape Sigli, Algeria (37°28′N 4°43′E) by SM U-34 (Imperial German Navy).
Neotsfield	United Kingdom	World War I: The full-rigged ship was scuttled in the Atlantic Ocean 112 nautical miles (207 km) south west by west of the Bishop Rock, Isles of Scilly (48°28′N 8°19′W) by SM UC-62 (Imperial German Navy). Her crew survived.
Rose of June	United Kingdom	World War I: The fishing vessel was scuttled in the North Sea 10 nautical miles (19 km) off Spurn Point by SM UC-63 (Imperial German Navy). Her crew survived.
Sonnin	Imperial German Navy	World War I: The Ditmar Koel-class Vorpostenboot was sunk by mines north west of Terschelling.
William and Betsy	United Kingdom	World War I: The fishing vessel was scuttled in the North Sea 10 nautical miles (19 km) north east of Spurn Point by SM UC-63 (Imperial German Navy). Her crew survived.

== 29 June ==
List of shipwrecks: 29 June 1917
Ship	State	Description
HMS Bayard	Royal Navy	The Q-ship was lost on this date.
Driskos	Greece	World War I: Convoy 430: The cargo ship was shelled and sunk in the Bay of Biscay 5 nautical miles (9.3 km) south west of the Île de Noirmoutier, Vendée, France (46°55′N 2°31′W) by SM UC-71 (Imperial German Navy) with the loss of a crew member.
Escondido	Norway	World War I: The cargo ship was sunk in the Atlantic Ocean 20 nautical miles (37 km) north north west of St. Kilda, Inverness-shire, United Kingdom by SM U-88 (Imperial German Navy). Her crew survived.
Gem	United Kingdom	World War I: The fishing vessel was shelled and sunk in the North Sea 18 nautical miles (33 km) east by south of Rattray Head, Aberdeenshire by SM UC-33 (Imperial German Navy). Her crew survived.
Lauwerzee	Netherlands	World War I: The trawler was shelled and sunk in the North Sea off Hook of Holland, South Holland by SM UC-21 (Imperial German Navy). Her seven crew took to the lifeboats but were not rescued.
Manx Princess	United Kingdom	World War I: The fishing vessel was shelled and sunk in the North Sea 18 nautical miles (33 km) east by south of Rattray Head by SM UC-33 (Imperial German Navy). Her crew survived.

== 30 June ==
List of shipwrecks: 30 June 1917
Ship	State	Description
Alkelda	Italy	World War I: The yacht was sunk in the Ligurian Sea by SM U-63 (Imperial German Navy).
Asalia	Norway	World War I: The four-masted barque was damaged in the Western Approaches (51°00′N 13°50′W) by SM UC-44 (Imperial German Navy). She sank the next day; her crew survived.
Benguela	Norway	World War I: The cargo ship, which had been captured on 14 June, was sunk in the Atlantic Ocean off Punta Delgada, Canary Islands, Spain (40°22′N 26°05′W) by SM U-155 (Imperial German Navy).
Borgund I	Norway	World War I: The coaster was sunk in the English Channel off Dartmouth, Devon, United Kingdom (50°33′N 2°33′W) by SM UB-40 (Imperial German Navy). Her crew survived.
Bröderna	Sweden	World War I: The fishing vessel was sunk in the North Sea north east of the Shetland Islands, United Kingdom by SM U-79 (Imperial German Navy).
Caledonien	France	World War I: The passenger ship struck a mine and sank in the Mediterranean Sea 30 nautical miles (56 km) north of Port Said, Egypt (31°45′N 32°23′E).
Château Yquem	France	World War I: The cargo ship was sunk in the English Channel 22 nautical miles (41 km) west of Portland Bill, Dorset, United Kingdom by SM UB-40 (Imperial German Navy).
HMS Cheerful	Royal Navy	World War I: The Mermaid-class destroyer struck a mine and sank in the Atlantic Ocean off the Shetland Islands (60°02′N 1°07′W) with the loss of 40 of her 62 crew.
Concettina	Italy	World War I: The sailing vessel was sunk in the Mediterranean Sea east of Sicily by SM UB-47 (Imperial German Navy).
Enrichetta	Italy	World War I: The cargo ship was torpedoed and sunk in the Gulf of Genoa (44°12′N 9°23′E) by SM U-63 (Imperial German Navy) with the loss of a crew member.
Flying Falcon	United Kingdom	The tug was driven ashore in Machrie Bay, Islay and was abandoned. She was salvaged in 1919, repaired and returned to service.
Germania	Sweden	World War I: The cargo ship was torpedoed and sunk in the North Sea whilst in convoy, 40 nautical miles (74 km) east of the Orkney Islands, United Kingdom (59°00′N 1°10′W) by SM UC-33 (Imperial German Navy). Her crew survived.
Haigh Hall	United Kingdom	World War I: The cargo ship was torpedoed and sunk in the Mediterranean Sea 40 nautical miles (74 km) east of Malta (36°12′N 15°24′E) by SM U-28 (Austro-Hungarian Navy). Her crew survived.
Il Nuovo Gasperino Gabriele	Italy	World War I: The sailing vessel was sunk in the Mediterranean Sea south west of Marsala, Sicily by SM UC-67 (Imperial German Navy).
Ilston	United Kingdom	World War I: The cargo ship was torpedoed and sunk in the English Channel 4 nautical miles (7.4 km) south east of The Lizard, Cornwall (49°56′N 5°07′W) by SM UB-23 (Imperial German Navy) with the loss of six of her crew.
Lady of the Lake	United Kingdom	World War I: The ketch was scuttled in the Atlantic Ocean 25 nautical miles (46 km) south east by east of Mine Head, County Cork by SM UC-30 (Imperial German Navy). Her crew survived.
Lancaster	Sweden	World War I: The fishing vessel was sunk in the North Sea north east of the Shetland Islands by SM U-79 (Imperial German Navy).
Leytenant Zatsarenni	Imperial Russian Navy	World War I: The Leytenant Shestakov-class destroyer struck a mine and sank in the Black Sea off the mouth of the Danube.
Markersdal	Denmark	World War I: The cargo ship was sunk in the North Sea 12 nautical miles (22 km) south of Flamborough Head, Yorkshire, United Kingdom by SM UC-63 (Imperial German Navy). Her crew survived.
Mont Viso	France	World War I: The troopship was sunk in the Mediterranean Sea off Gourraya, Algeria (36°39′N 1°55′E) by SM U-34 (Imperial German Navy).
Phoebus	Italy	World War I: The cargo ship was torpedoed and sunk in the Irish Sea off Castletownbere, Ireland by SM UC-44 (Imperial German Navy). Her crew survived.
Preceptor	Sweden	World War I: The fishing vessel was sunk in the North Sea north east of the Shetland Islands (61°42′N 1°17′E) by SM U-79 (Imperial German Navy).
Sacra Famiglia	Italy	World War I: The sailing vessel was sunk in the Mediterranean Sea east of Sicily by SM UB-47 (Imperial German Navy).
Siraa	Norway	World War I: The full-rigged ship was sunk in the Atlantic Ocean off Ponta Delgada, Azore Islands (40°22′N 26°51′W) by SM U-155 (Imperial German Navy). Her crew survived.

== Unknown date ==
List of shipwrecks: Unknown date 1917
Ship	State	Description
Edouard Corbiere	French Navy	The naval trawler was lost in June.
Keeper	United Kingdom	World War I: The coaster was sunk in the Irish Sea by a Kaiserliche Marine submarine with the loss of ten of her crew.
Toro	Argentina	World War I: The cargo ship was sunk in the Strait of Gibraltar by enemy action in the week ending 26 June.
