= SM U-100 =

German submarine

History

German Empire
- Name: U-100
- Ordered: 15 September 1915
- Builder: AG Weser, Bremen
- Yard number: 251
- Laid down: 30 November 1915
- Launched: 25 February 1917
- Commissioned: 16 April 1917
- Fate: Surrendered 27 November 1918; scrapped Swansea 1919

General characteristics
- Class & type: German Type U 57 submarine
- Displacement: 750 t (740 long tons) surfaced; 952 t (937 long tons) submerged
- Length: 67.60 m (221 ft 9 in) (o/a); 54.02 m (177 ft 3 in) (pressure hull)
- Beam: 6.32 m (20 ft 9 in) (o/a); 4.05 m (13 ft 3 in) (pressure hull)
- Height: 8.25 m (27 ft 1 in)
- Draught: 3.65 m (12 ft)
- Installed power: 2 × 2,400 PS (1,765 kW; 2,367 shp) surfaced; 2 × 1,200 PS (883 kW; 1,184 shp) submerged
- Propulsion: 2 shafts, 2 × 1.65 m (5 ft 5 in) propellers
- Speed: 16.5 knots (30.6 km/h; 19.0 mph) surfaced; 8.8 knots (16.3 km/h; 10.1 mph) submerged
- Range: 10,100 nmi (18,700 km; 11,600 mi) at 8 knots (15 km/h; 9.2 mph) surfaced; 56 nmi (104 km; 64 mi) at 5 knots (9.3 km/h; 5.8 mph) submerged
- Test depth: 50 m (164 ft 1 in)
- Complement: 4 officers, 32 enlisted
- Armament: 4 × 50 cm (19.7 in) torpedo tubes (two bow, two stern); 10–12 torpedoes; 1 × 10.5 cm (4.1 in) SK L/45 deck gun

Service record
- Part of: II Flotilla; 31 May 1917 – 11 November 1918
- Commanders: Kptlt. Freiherr Degenhart von Loë; 31 May 1917 – 30 September 1918; Kptlt. Friedrich Götting; 1 October – 11 November 1918
- Operations: 8 patrols
- Victories: 10 merchant ships sunk (34,505 GRT); 2 merchant ships damaged (5,272 GRT)

SM U-100 (Note: "SM" stands for "Seiner Majestät" (English: His Majesty's) and combined with the U for Unterseeboot would be translated as His Majesty's Submarine.) was one of the 329 submarines serving in the Imperial German Navy in World War I. U-100 was engaged in the German campaign against Allied commerce (Handelskrieg) during that conflict.

U-100 was surrendered to the Allies at Harwich on 21 November 1918 in accordance with the requirements of the Armistice with Germany. After being exhibited at Blyth in December 1918, she was sold while lying there by the British Admiralty to George Cohen on 3 March 1919 for £2,250 (excluding her engines), and was broken up at Swansea. Her engines were sold to Southend Corporation for use in an electricity generating station.

== Summary of raiding history ==
Date	Name	Nationality	Tonnage (Note: Tonnages are in gross register tons)	Fate
14 June 1917	Cedarbank	Norway	2,825	Sunk
17 June 1917	Gunhild	Denmark	996	Sunk
22 June 1917	Melford Hall	United Kingdom	6,339	Sunk
5 August 1917	Kathleen	United Kingdom	3,915	Sunk
9 August 1917	Blagdon	United Kingdom	1,996	Sunk
27 December 1917	Adela	United Kingdom	685	Sunk
15 February 1918	Thalatta I	Netherlands	358	Damaged
21 February 1918	Rio Verde	United Kingdom	4,025	Sunk
16 April 1918	Lake Michigan	United Kingdom	9,288	Sunk
9 June 1918	Helene	Netherlands	112	Sunk
21 June 1918	Homer City	United Kingdom	4,914	Damaged
21 June 1918	Montebello	United Kingdom	4,324	Sunk

== Bibliography ==
- Gröner, Erich; Jung, Dieter; Maass, Martin (1991). U-boats and Mine Warfare Vessels. German Warships 1815–1945. Vol. 2. Translated by Thomas, Keith; Magowan, Rachel. London: Conway Maritime Press. ISBN 0-85177-593-4.
