= SM U-82 =

U-boat of the Imperial German Navy during World War I

History

German Empire
- Name: U-82
- Ordered: 23 June 1915
- Builder: Germaniawerft, Kiel
- Yard number: 252
- Laid down: 31 August 1915
- Launched: 1 July 1916
- Commissioned: 16 September 1916
- Fate: 16 January 1919 – Surrendered. Broken up at Blyth in 1919–20.

General characteristics
- Displacement: 808 t (795 long tons) surfaced; 946 t (931 long tons) submerged
- Length: 70.06 m (229 ft 10 in) (o/a); 55.55 m (182 ft 3 in) (pressure hull)
- Beam: 6.30 m (20 ft 8 in) (oa); 4.15 m (13 ft 7 in) (pressure hull)
- Height: 8.00 m (26 ft 3 in)
- Draught: 4.02 m (13 ft 2 in)
- Installed power: 2 × 2,400 PS (1,765 kW; 2,367 shp) surfaced; 2 × 1,200 PS (883 kW; 1,184 shp) submerged
- Propulsion: 2 shafts, 2 × 1.70 m (5 ft 7 in) propellers
- Speed: 16.8 knots (31.1 km/h; 19.3 mph) surfaced; 9.1 knots (16.9 km/h; 10.5 mph) submerged
- Range: 11,220 nmi (20,780 km; 12,910 mi) at 8 knots (15 km/h; 9.2 mph) surfaced; 56 nmi (104 km; 64 mi) at 5 knots (9.3 km/h; 5.8 mph) submerged
- Test depth: 50 m (160 ft)
- Complement: 4 officers, 31 enlisted
- Armament: 4 × 50 cm (19.7 in) torpedo tubes (two bow, two stern); 12–16 torpedoes; 1 × 10.5 cm (4.1 in) SK L/45 deck gun

Service record
- Part of: IV Flotilla; 21 November 1916 – 11 November 1918
- Commanders: Kptlt. Hans Adam; 16 September 1916 – 29 April 1918; Kptlt. Heinrich Middendorf; 30 April – 11 November 1918
- Operations: 11 patrols
- Victories: 34 merchant ships sunk (98,091 GRT); 2 auxiliary warships sunk (10,219 GRT); 2 merchant ships damaged (14,542 GRT); 1 auxiliary warship damaged (18,372 GRT)

SM U-82 was a Type U 81 U-boat of the Imperial German Navy during World War I.

She was launched on 1 July 1916 and commissioned on 16 September 1916 under Hans Adam. She was assigned to IV Flotilla on 21 November 1916, serving with them throughout the war. She carried out 11 patrols during the war, commanded from 30 April 1918 by Heinrich Middendorff. SM U-82 sank 36 ships for a total of 110,160 gross register tons (GRT), and damaging a further three ships for 32,914 tons. Among the ships she damaged was the USS Mount Vernon, the former SS Kronprinzessin Cecilie. At 18,372 tons she was one of the largest ships to be hit by a U-boat during the war.

She was surrendered to the British on 16 January 1919 under the terms of the armistice, and was broken up at Blyth between 1919 and 1920.

== Design ==
Type U 81 submarines were preceded by the shorter Type UE I submarines. U-82 had a displacement of 808 tonnes (795 long tons) when at the surface and 946 tonnes (931 long tons) while submerged. She had a total length of 70.06 m (229 ft 10 in), a pressure hull length of 55.55 m (182 ft 3 in), a beam of 6.30 m (20 ft 8 in), a height of 8 m (26 ft 3 in), and a draught of 4.02 m (13 ft 2 in). The submarine was powered by two 2,400 metric horsepower (1,800 kW; 2,400 shp) engines for use while surfaced, and two 1,200 metric horsepower (880 kW; 1,200 shp) engines for use while submerged. She had two propeller shafts. She was capable of operating at depths of up to 50 metres (160 ft).

The submarine had a maximum surface speed of 16.8 knots (31.1 km/h; 19.3 mph) and a maximum submerged speed of 9.1 knots (16.9 km/h; 10.5 mph). When submerged, she could operate for 56 nautical miles (104 km; 64 mi) at 5 knots (9.3 km/h; 5.8 mph); when surfaced, she could travel 11,220 nautical miles (20,780 km; 12,910 mi) at 8 knots (15 km/h; 9.2 mph). U-82 was fitted with four 50 centimetres (20 in) torpedo tubes (one at the starboard bow and one starboard stern), twelve to sixteen torpedoes, and one 10.5 cm (4.1 in) SK L/45 deck gun. She had a complement of thirty-five (thirty-one crew members and four officers).

== Summary of raiding history ==
Date	Name	Nationality	Tonnage (Note: Merchant ship tonnages are in gross register tons. Military vessels are listed by tons displacement.)	Fate
5 December 1916	Dorit	Denmark	242	Sunk
5 December 1916	Ella	Norway	879	Sunk
6 December 1916	Christine	Denmark	196	Sunk
6 December 1916	Robert	Denmark	353	Sunk
10 December 1916	Gerda	Denmark	287	Sunk
2 January 1917	Omnium	France	8,719	Sunk
3 January 1917	Viking	Denmark	761	Sunk
4 January 1917	Calabro	Kingdom of Italy	1,925	Sunk
5 January 1917	Ebro	Denmark	1,028	Sunk
6 January 1917	Beaufront	United Kingdom	1,720	Sunk
23 April 1917	Marita	Norway	1,759	Sunk
24 April 1917	Thistleard	United Kingdom	4,136	Sunk
25 April 1917	Hackensack	United Kingdom	4,060	Sunk
4 May 1917	Ellin	Greece	4,577	Damaged
11 June 1917	HMS Zylpha	Royal Navy	2,917	Sunk
13 June 1917	Storegut	Norway	2,557	Sunk
14 June 1917	Ortolan	United Kingdom	1,727	Sunk
14 June 1917	Taplow	United Kingdom	2,981	Sunk
15 June 1917	Albertine Beatrice	Netherlands	1,379	Sunk
15 June 1917	Westonby	United Kingdom	3,795	Sunk
16 June 1917	Jessie	United Kingdom	2,256	Sunk
18 June 1917	Thistledhu	United Kingdom	4,026	Sunk
25 July 1917	Monkstone	United Kingdom	3,097	Sunk
31 July 1917	Orubian	United Kingdom	3,876	Sunk
31 July 1917	HMS Quernmore	Royal Navy	7,302	Sunk
19 September 1917	Saint Ronald	United Kingdom	4,387	Sunk
15 November 1917	De Dollart	Netherlands	243	Sunk
19 February 1918	Glencarron	United Kingdom	5,117	Sunk
19 February 1918	Philadelphian	United Kingdom	5,165	Sunk
8 April 1918	Tainui	United Kingdom	9,965	Damaged
10 April 1918	Westfield	United Kingdom	3,453	Sunk
5 June 1918	Argonaut	United States	4,826	Sunk
7 June 1918	Brisk	Norway	1,662	Sunk
8 June 1918	Hunsgrove	United Kingdom	3,063	Sunk
8 June 1918	Saima	United Kingdom	1,147	Sunk
4 September 1918	Dora	United States	7,037	Sunk
5 September 1918	USS Mount Vernon	United States Navy	18,372	Damaged
12 September 1918	Galway Castle	United Kingdom	7,988	Sunk
16 September 1918	Madryn	United Kingdom	2,244	Sunk

== Bibliography ==
- Gröner, Erich; Jung, Dieter; Maass, Martin (1991). U-boats and Mine Warfare Vessels. German Warships 1815–1945. Vol. 2. Translated by Thomas, Keith; Magowan, Rachel. London: Conway Maritime Press. ISBN 0-85177-593-4.
