= SM UC-27 =

German Type UC II minelaying U-boat

History

German Empire
- Name: UC-27
- Ordered: 29 August 1915
- Builder: AG Vulcan, Hamburg
- Yard number: 66
- Launched: 28 June 1916
- Commissioned: 25 July 1916
- Fate: Surrendered, 3 February 1919; broken up, July 1921

General characteristics
- Class & type: Type UC II submarine
- Displacement: 400 t (390 long tons), surfaced; 480 t (470 long tons), submerged
- Length: 49.45 m (162 ft 3 in) o/a; 39.30 m (128 ft 11 in) pressure hull
- Beam: 5.22 m (17 ft 2 in) o/a; 3.65 m (12 ft) pressure hull
- Draught: 3.68 m (12 ft 1 in)
- Propulsion: 2 × propeller shafts; 2 × 6-cylinder, 4-stroke diesel engines, 500 PS (370 kW; 490 bhp); 2 × electric motors, 460 PS (340 kW; 450 shp)
- Speed: 11.6 knots (21.5 km/h; 13.3 mph), surfaced; 6.6 knots (12.2 km/h; 7.6 mph), submerged
- Range: 9,260 nmi (17,150 km; 10,660 mi) at 7 knots (13 km/h; 8.1 mph), surfaced; 53 nmi (98 km; 61 mi) at 4 knots (7.4 km/h; 4.6 mph), submerged
- Test depth: 50 m (160 ft)
- Complement: 26
- Armament: 6 × 100 cm (39.4 in) mine tubes; 18 × UC 200 mines; 3 × 50 cm (19.7 in) torpedo tubes (2 bow/external; one stern); 7 × torpedoes; 1 × 8.8 cm (3.5 in) Uk L/30 deck gun
- Notes: 48-second diving time

Service record
- Part of: Baltic Flotilla; 15 September 1916 – 30 April 1917; Pola / Mittelmeer / Mittelmeer II Flotilla; 30 April 1917 - 11 November 1918
- Commanders: Oblt.z.S. Karl Vesper; 25 July 1916 – 7 February 1917; Kptlt. Gerhard Schulz; 8 February – 27 November 1917; Kptlt. Wilhelm Canaris; 28 November 1917 – 14 January 1918; Oblt.z.S. Otto Gerke; 15 January – 29 November 1918
- Operations: 14 patrols
- Victories: 55 merchant ships sunk (75,451 GRT); 3 warships sunk (830 tons); 2 warships damaged (16,804 tons)

SM UC-27 was a German Type UC II minelaying submarine or U-boat in the German Imperial Navy (German: Kaiserliche Marine) during World War I. The U-boat was ordered on 29 August 1915 and was launched on 28 June 1916. She was commissioned into the German Imperial Navy on 25 July 1916 as SM UC-27. (Note: "SM" stands for "Seiner Majestät" (English: His Majesty's) and combined with the U for Unterseeboot would be translated as His Majesty's Submarine.) In 14 patrols, UC-27 was credited with sinking 58 ships, either by torpedo or by mines laid.

SS Skifted left from Mariehamn at 8:30 o'clock 14 December 1916, carrying 56 military persons, 7 workers, 15 members of the crew, and 13 civilians, a total of 91 persons. One hour later it was hit by the sea mines laid by the UC-27 and sank soon near Ledsun on the territory of the Lemland municipality of Åland. 86 persons died.

UC-27 was surrendered to France on 3 February 1919 and was broken up at Landerneau in July 1921.

== Design ==
A Type UC II submarine, UC-27 had a displacement of 400 tonnes (390 long tons) when at the surface and 480 tonnes (470 long tons) while submerged. She had a length overall of 49.45 m (162 ft 3 in), a beam of 5.22 m (17 ft 2 in), and a draught of 3.68 m (12 ft 1 in). The submarine was powered by two six-cylinder four-stroke diesel engines each producing 250 metric horsepower (180 kW; 250 shp) (a total of 500 metric horsepower (370 kW; 490 shp)), two electric motors producing 460 metric horsepower (340 kW; 450 shp), and two propeller shafts. She had a dive time of 48 seconds and was capable of operating at a depth of 50 metres (160 ft).

The submarine had a maximum surface speed of 11.6 knots (21.5 km/h; 13.3 mph) and a submerged speed of 6.6 knots (12.2 km/h; 7.6 mph). When submerged, she could operate for 53 nautical miles (98 km; 61 mi) at 4 knots (7.4 km/h; 4.6 mph); when surfaced, she could travel 9,260 nautical miles (17,150 km; 10,660 mi) at 7 knots (13 km/h; 8.1 mph). UC-27 was fitted with six 100 centimetres (39 in) mine tubes, eighteen UC 200 mines, three 50 centimetres (20 in) torpedo tubes (one on the stern and two on the bow), seven torpedoes, and one 8.8 cm (3.5 in) Uk L/30 deck gun. Her complement was twenty-six crew members.

== Summary of raiding history ==
Date	Name	Nationality	Tonnage (Note: Merchant ship tonnages are in gross register tons. Military vessels are listed by tons displacement.)	Fate
28 October 1916	Kazanets	Imperial Russian Navy	580	Sunk
7 November 1916	Letun	Imperial Russian Navy	1,260	Damaged
19 November 1916	Rurik	Imperial Russian Navy	15,544	Damaged
22 November 1916	Fugas	Imperial Russian Navy	150	Sunk
18 December 1916	Buki	Imperial Russian Navy	4,499	Sunk
21 December 1916	Skiftet	Russian Empire	336	Sunk
6 April 1917	Narberth Castle	United Kingdom	168	Sunk
6 April 1917	Nestor	United Kingdom	176	Sunk
12 April 1917	Ernst Sophie	Russian Empire	222	Sunk
13 April 1917	Kariba	United Kingdom	3,697	Sunk
15 April 1917	Gretaston	United Kingdom	3,395	Sunk
18 April 1917	Thomas	United Kingdom	132	Sunk
26 April 1917	Augusta	Kingdom of Italy	686	Sunk
26 April 1917	Gennarino	Kingdom of Italy	248	Sunk
16 June 1917	Emsli	Tunisia	31	Sunk
16 June 1917	Kamouma	Tunisia	18	Sunk
16 June 1917	Kibira	Tunisia	8	Sunk
16 June 1917	Liberte	Tunisia	12	Sunk
16 June 1917	Metlaoni	Tunisia	30	Sunk
17 June 1917	Argentina	Kingdom of Italy	41	Sunk
17 June 1917	Bell Angelina	Kingdom of Italy	14	Sunk
17 June 1917	Giuseppe S.	Kingdom of Italy	20	Sunk
17 June 1917	Luigina	Kingdom of Italy	19	Sunk
17 June 1917	San Antonio V	Kingdom of Italy	23	Sunk
18 June 1917	Bettina	Kingdom of Italy	140	Sunk
18 June 1917	Bianca B.	Kingdom of Italy	329	Sunk
18 June 1917	Letizia G.	Kingdom of Italy	136	Sunk
18 June 1917	Marietta B.	Kingdom of Italy	53	Sunk
18 June 1917	Paolina Aida	Kingdom of Italy	250	Sunk
19 June 1917	Amalia	Kingdom of Italy	22	Sunk
19 June 1917	Antonio Balbi	Kingdom of Italy	25	Sunk
19 June 1917	Domenica Madre	Kingdom of Italy	51	Sunk
19 June 1917	La Michelina	Kingdom of Italy	34	Sunk
19 June 1917	Mistica Rosa	Kingdom of Italy	31	Sunk
19 June 1917	Raffaelo	Kingdom of Italy	24	Sunk
19 June 1917	Rosinella	Kingdom of Italy	27	Sunk
19 June 1917	S. Vincenzo Ferrari P.	Kingdom of Italy	52	Sunk
19 June 1917	San Antonio	Kingdom of Italy	28	Sunk
19 June 1917	San Giovanni Battista	Kingdom of Italy	32	Sunk
20 June 1917	Ruperra	United Kingdom	4,232	Sunk
23 June 1917	Jules	France	49	Sunk
26 July 1917	Mooltan	United Kingdom	9,621	Sunk
6 August 1917	El Kaddra Nr. 53	Tunisia	20	Sunk
7 August 1917	Esemplare	Kingdom of Italy	999	Sunk
12 September 1917	Gibraltar	United Kingdom	3,803	Sunk
16 September 1917	Annina Capano	Kingdom of Italy	250	Sunk
17 September 1917	Eugenio D.	Kingdom of Italy	99	Sunk
17 September 1917	Muccio	Kingdom of Italy	137	Sunk
23 September 1917	Joaquina	Spain	69	Sunk
23 September 1917	Medie	France	4,770	Sunk
26 February 1918	Maltby	United Kingdom	3,977	Sunk
27 February 1918	Machaon	United Kingdom	6,738	Sunk
28 February 1918	Savoyarde	France	30	Sunk
4 March 1918	Clan Macpherson	United Kingdom	4,779	Sunk
8 March 1918	Ayr	United Kingdom	3,050	Sunk
1 May 1918	Matiana	United Kingdom	5,313	Sunk
13 August 1918	La Chaussade	France	4,494	Sunk
23 August 1918	Australian Transport	United Kingdom	4,784	Sunk
25 August 1918	Willingtonia	United Kingdom	3,228	Sunk
22 January 1919	Torpilleur 325	French Navy	100	Sunk

== Bibliography ==
- Bendert, Harald (2001). Die UC-Boote der Kaiserlichen Marine 1914-1918. Minenkrieg mit U-Booten (in German). Hamburg, Berlin, Bonn: Mittler. ISBN 3-8132-0758-7.
- Gröner, Erich; Jung, Dieter; Maass, Martin (1991). U-boats and Mine Warfare Vessels. German Warships 1815–1945. Vol. 2. Translated by Thomas, Keith; Magowan, Rachel. London: Conway Maritime Press. ISBN 0-85177-593-4.
- Gardiner, Robert; Gray, Randal, eds. (1985). Conway's All the World's Fighting Ships 1906–1921. Annapolis, Maryland: Naval Institute Press. ISBN 978-0-87021-907-8. OCLC 12119866.
- Tarrant, V. E. (1989). The U-Boat Offensive: 1914–1945. Annapolis, Maryland: Naval Institute Press. ISBN 978-0-87021-764-7. OCLC 20338385.
