= German submarine U-72 =

U-72 may refer to one of the following German submarines:

- SM U-72, a Type UE I submarine launched in 1915 and that served in World War I until scuttled on 1 November 1918
  - During World War I, Germany also had these submarines with similar names:
    - SM UB-72, a Type UB III submarine launched in 1917 and sunk on 12 May 1918
    - SM UC-72, a Type UC II submarine launched in 1916 and went missing after 21 August 1917
- German submarine U-72, a Type VIIC submarine that served in World War II until scuttled on 2 May 1945
