= SM U-94 =

History

German Empire
- Name: U-94
- Ordered: 15 September 1915
- Builder: Germaniawerft, Kiel
- Yard number: 258
- Laid down: 25 March 1916
- Launched: 5 January 1917
- Commissioned: 3 March 1917
- Fate: Surrendered 20 November 1918

General characteristics
- Class & type: Type U 93 submarine
- Displacement: 838 t (825 long tons) surfaced; 1,000 t (980 long tons) submerged
- Length: 71.55 m (234 ft 9 in) (o/a); 56.05 m (183 ft 11 in) (pressure hull)
- Beam: 6.30 m (20 ft 8 in) (o/a); 4.15 m (13 ft 7 in) (pressure hull)
- Height: 8.25 m (27 ft 1 in)
- Draught: 3.94 m (12 ft 11 in)
- Installed power: 2 × 2,400 PS (1,765 kW; 2,367 shp) surfaced; 2 × 1,200 PS (883 kW; 1,184 shp) submerged
- Propulsion: 2 shafts, 2 × 1.66 m (5 ft 5 in) propellers
- Speed: 16.8 knots (31.1 km/h; 19.3 mph) surfaced; 8.6 knots (15.9 km/h; 9.9 mph) submerged
- Range: 9,020 nmi (16,710 km; 10,380 mi) at 8 knots (15 km/h; 9.2 mph) surfaced; 52 nmi (96 km; 60 mi) at 5 knots (9.3 km/h; 5.8 mph) submerged
- Test depth: 50 m (160 ft)
- Complement: 4 officers, 32 enlisted
- Armament: 6 × 50 cm (19.7 in) torpedo tubes (four bow, two stern); 12-16 torpedoes; 1 × 8.8 cm (3.5 in) SK L/30 deck gun

Service record
- Part of: IV Flotilla; 20 April 1917 – 11 November 1918
- Commanders: Kptlt. Alfred Saalwächter; 3 March 1917 – 24 March 1918; Oblt.z.S. Martin Schwab; 25 March – 11 November 1918
- Operations: 13 patrol
- Victories: 20 merchant ships sunk (60,631 GRT); 1 warship sunk (1,250 tons); 3 merchant ships damaged (19,326 GRT)

SM U-94 was a Type U 93 submarine and one of the 329 submarines serving in the Imperial German Navy in World War I. U-94 was engaged in the naval warfare and took part in the First Battle of the Atlantic.

== Design ==
Type U 93 submarines were preceded by the shorter Type U 87 submarines. U-94 had a displacement of 838 tonnes (825 long tons) when at the surface and 1,000 tonnes (980 long tons) while submerged. She had a total length of 71.55 m (234 ft 9 in), a pressure hull length of 56.05 m (183 ft 11 in), a beam of 6.30 m (20 ft 8 in), a height of 8.25 m (27 ft 1 in), and a draught of 3.94 m (12 ft 11 in). The submarine was powered by two 2,400 metric horsepower (1,800 kW; 2,400 shp) engines for use while surfaced, and two 1,200 metric horsepower (880 kW; 1,200 shp) engines for use while submerged. She had two propeller shafts. She was capable of operating at depths of up to 50 metres (160 ft).

The submarine had a maximum surface speed of 16.8 knots (31.1 km/h; 19.3 mph) and a maximum submerged speed of 8.6 knots (15.9 km/h; 9.9 mph). When submerged, she could operate for 52 nautical miles (96 km; 60 mi) at 5 knots (9.3 km/h; 5.8 mph); when surfaced, she could travel 9,020 nautical miles (16,710 km; 10,380 mi) at 8 knots (15 km/h; 9.2 mph). U-94 was fitted with six 50 centimetres (20 in) torpedo tubes (four at the bow and two at the stern), twelve to sixteen torpedoes, and one 8.8 cm (3.5 in) SK L/30 deck gun. She had a complement of thirty-six (thirty-two crew members and four officers).

== Summary of raiding history ==
Date	Name	Nationality	Tonnage (Note: Merchant ship tonnages are in gross register tons. Military vessels are listed by tons displacement.)	Fate
9 June 1917	Deveron	Norway	1,261	Sunk
11 June 1917	Thessaly	United Kingdom	4,310	Damaged
12 June 1917	Amakura	United Kingdom	2,316	Sunk
13 June 1917	Cederic	Norway	2,344	Sunk
20 June 1917	HMS Salvia	Royal Navy	1,250	Sunk
24 June 1917	Sylvanian	United Kingdom	4,858	Sunk
26 June 1917	Haverford	United Kingdom	11,635	Damaged
29 July 1917	Ingeborg	Denmark	1,207	Sunk
29 July 1917	Adalia	United Kingdom	3,847	Sunk
30 July 1917	Kildin	Russian Empire	1,640	Sunk
30 July 1917	Manchester Inventor	United Kingdom	4,112	Sunk
30 July 1917	Souma	Russian Empire	2,200	Sunk
6 August 1917	Argalia	United Kingdom	4,641	Sunk
12 August 1917	Lynorta	United Kingdom	3,684	Sunk
16 August 1917	Svanholm	Denmark	1,400	Sunk
19 September 1917	Hydra	Denmark	174	Sunk
24 September 1917	Petersham	United Kingdom	3,381	Damaged
15 December 1917	Bernard	United Kingdom	3,682	Sunk
16 December 1917	Bristol City	United Kingdom	2,511	Sunk
19 February 1918	Barrowmore	United Kingdom	3,832	Sunk
26 February 1918	Snyg	Norway	370	Sunk
2 March 1918	Rockpool	United Kingdom	4,502	Sunk
18 May 1918	Hurunui	United Kingdom	10,644	Sunk
25 May 1918	Saphir	Norway	1,406	Sunk

== Bibliography ==
- Gröner, Erich; Jung, Dieter; Maass, Martin (1991). U-boats and Mine Warfare Vessels. German Warships 1815–1945. Vol. 2. Translated by Thomas, Keith; Magowan, Rachel. London: Conway Maritime Press. ISBN 0-85177-593-4.
