= SM UC-44 =

German Type UC II minelaying U-boat

History

German Empire
- Name: UC-44
- Ordered: 20 November 1915
- Builder: AG Vulcan, Hamburg
- Yard number: 77
- Launched: 10 October 1916
- Commissioned: 4 November 1916
- Fate: Sunk by own mine, 4 August 1917, raised and broken up

General characteristics
- Class & type: Type UC II submarine
- Displacement: 400 t (390 long tons), surfaced; 480 t (470 long tons), submerged
- Length: 49.45 m (162 ft 3 in) o/a; 40.30 m (132 ft 3 in) pressure hull
- Beam: 5.22 m (17 ft 2 in) o/a; 3.65 m (12 ft) pressure hull
- Draught: 3.68 m (12 ft 1 in)
- Propulsion: 2 × propeller shafts; 2 × 6-cylinder, 4-stroke diesel engines, 520 PS (380 kW; 510 shp); 2 × electric motors, 460 PS (340 kW; 450 shp)
- Speed: 11.7 knots (21.7 km/h; 13.5 mph), surfaced; 6.7 knots (12.4 km/h; 7.7 mph), submerged
- Range: 9,410 nmi (17,430 km; 10,830 mi) at 7 knots (13 km/h; 8.1 mph) surfaced; 60 nmi (110 km; 69 mi) at 4 knots (7.4 km/h; 4.6 mph) submerged
- Test depth: 50 m (160 ft)
- Complement: 26
- Armament: 6 × 100 cm (39.4 in) mine tubes; 18 × UC 200 mines; 3 × 50 cm (19.7 in) torpedo tubes (2 bow/external; one stern); 7 × torpedoes; 1 × 8.8 cm (3.5 in) Uk L/30 deck gun
- Notes: 48-second diving time

Service record
- Part of: I Flotilla; 1 January – 4 August 1917
- Commanders: Kptlt. Kurt Tebbenjohanns; 4 November 1916 – 4 August 1917
- Operations: 6 patrols
- Victories: 27 merchant ships sunk (25,475 GRT); 1 warship sunk (550 tons); 1 warship damaged (810 tons); 1 merchant ship taken as prize (229 GRT)

SM UC-44 was a German Type UC II minelaying submarine or U-boat in the German Imperial Navy (German: Kaiserliche Marine) during World War I. The U-boat was ordered on 20 November 1915 and was launched on 10 October 1916. She was commissioned into the German Imperial Navy on 4 November 1916 as SM UC-44. (Note: "SM" stands for "Seiner Majestät" (English: His Majesty's) and combined with the U for Unterseeboot would be translated as His Majesty's Submarine.) In 6 patrols UC-44 was credited with sinking 28 ships, either by torpedo or by mines laid. UC-44 was sunk by the detonation of one of her own mines off the Irish coast at position 52°07′N 6°59′W on 4 August 1917; its commander, Kurt Teppenjohanns, was the only survivor. UC-44's wreck was raised by the Royal Navy in September 1917 and later broken up.

Two aspects of her service are noteworthy. UC-44 was the first submarine to use the tactic of releasing oil and debris from her torpedo tubes to fool the enemy into believing it had been sunk by depth charges. Her actual sinking, sometimes claimed to be the result of British deception, also yielded intelligence that showed how little effect the Dover Barrage antisubmarine defences were having on the U-boats and forced changes in its command and operation before the year ended.

== Design ==
A Type UC II submarine, UC-44 had a displacement of 400 tonnes (390 long tons) when at the surface and 480 tonnes (470 long tons) while submerged. She had a length overall of 49.45 m (162 ft 3 in), a beam of 5.22 m (17 ft 2 in), and a draught of 3.68 m (12 ft 1 in). The submarine was powered by two six-cylinder four-stroke diesel engines each producing 260 metric horsepower (190 kW; 260 shp) (a total of 520 metric horsepower (380 kW; 510 shp)), two electric motors producing 460 metric horsepower (340 kW; 450 shp), and two propeller shafts. She had a dive time of 48 seconds and was capable of operating at a depth of 50 metres (160 ft).

The submarine had a maximum surface speed of 11.7 knots (21.7 km/h; 13.5 mph) and a submerged speed of 6.7 knots (12.4 km/h; 7.7 mph). When submerged, she could operate for 60 nautical miles (110 km; 69 mi) at 4 knots (7.4 km/h; 4.6 mph); when surfaced, she could travel 9,410 nautical miles (17,430 km; 10,830 mi) at 7 knots (13 km/h; 8.1 mph). UC-44 was fitted with six 100-centimetre (39 in) mine tubes, eighteen UC 200 mines, three 50-centimetre (20 in) torpedo tubes (one on the stern and two on the bow), seven torpedoes, and one 8.8 cm (3.5 in) Uk L/30 deck gun. Her complement was twenty-six crew members.

== Deception tactics ==
During a particularly intense depth charge attack on 15 February 1917, Kapitanleutnant Kurt Tebbenjohanns, UC-44's commander, ordered that the vessel's front torpedo tubes be filled with waste oil and other debris, then fired, simulating what might have been expected to reach the surface had the submarine sank. The ruse worked, and the attack was ended, allowing UC-44 to escape. Other U-boat commanders, and eventually their counterparts in other navies, adopted this deception tactic. It was particularly effective for the Germans at first, as British commanders were easily satisfied that they had sunk the enemy.

== Sinking ==
In summer 1917 UC-44 was operating off Waterford Harbour on the southern coast of Ireland, laying mines and then re-laying them after British minesweepers had cleared the field. The Royal Navy officers in charge of the minesweeping surmised from the regularity with which this occurred and the haste with which the mines were laid that the Germans had broken their codes. Some of them later claimed that, realising this, they had the minesweeper run a dummy operation in mid-July, leaving all the mines in place and reporting that it had cleared them using the code suspected to have been broken, then closing the harbour to all shipping for two weeks. The hope was reportedly that a stricken U-boat would sink in shallow water where it and its contents could be recovered and examined by Room 40 and other departments of naval intelligence. however the historical record suggests that the British had not become aware of the compromised code and closed Waterford until after UC-44 sank.

UC-44 returned to Waterford to lay nine mines on the night of 4 August. After four had been successfully deployed west of the harbour, it set out to lay the other five in the centre. As it was releasing the last, from a chute in the rear of the vessel, an explosion occurred and the submarine sank in 25 metres (82 ft) of water. Tebenjohanns and two others managed to escape through the conning tower hatch, but the commander was the only one still alive when a British vessel swept the area for survivors an hour and a half later (another account suggests that another crewmember was found separately).

The British were pleasantly surprised that they had been fortunate enough to capture a U-boat commander. One officer who took tea with Tebenjohanns said the commander complained that the minesweepers had not done their jobs efficiently; they reportedly allowed him to share this news with his own superiors along with the report of his capture. When he was asked if the Germans had broken the code used by the British minesweepers, he said that as an officer he could not answer that, but the interrogator believed his demeanor and body language as he replied betrayed that the Germans had indeed done so.

Navy divers later reached the wrecked submarine to sweep it for intelligence, something the British had not previously been able to do with a sunken U-boat. They described the explosion damage as concentrated around UC-44's stern and engine room, near where the mine had been released from. This, along with the other eight mines being discovered and swept, suggests that the submarine sank when one of its own mines accidentally detonated while being laid, and not due to any deception operation by the Royal Navy, or as other accounts have it a leftover mine laid by UC-42

Intelligence recovered from UC-44 was greatly disturbing to the Admiralty. The submarine's logs showed that U-boats were passing the Dover Barrage at will; Tebenjohanns' standing orders were to pass the net on the surface at night when possible and dive no deeper than 40 metres (130 ft) if not. U-boats that for whatever reason bypassed the English Channel entirely and went around the northern tip of Scotland were advised to do so completely on the surface since that would lead the English to think the Dover defences were working. This discovery was a contributing factor to Reginald Bacon being relieved as commander of the Dover Patrol at the end of the year.

== Summary of raiding history ==
Date	Name	Nationality	Tonnage (Note: Merchant ship tonnages are in gross register tons. Military vessels are listed by tons displacement.)	Fate
11 February 1917	Ashwold	United Kingdom	129	Sunk
12 February 1917	Adolf	Sweden	835	Sunk
12 February 1917	Dale	United Kingdom	198	Sunk
13 February 1917	King Alfred	United Kingdom	159	Sunk
14 February 1917	Belvoir Castle	United Kingdom	221	Sunk
14 February 1917	Mary Bell	United Kingdom	144	Sunk
5 March 1917	Guadiana	Portugal	326	Sunk
7 March 1917	Adalands	Norway	1,577	Sunk
7 March 1917	Westwick	United Kingdom	5,694	Sunk
12 March 1917	Lucy Anderson	United Kingdom	1,073	Sunk
12 March 1917	Marna	Norway	914	Sunk
13 March 1917	Navenby	United Kingdom	167	Sunk
13 March 1917	Nuttallia	United Kingdom	229	Captured as prize
13 April 1917	Bandon	United Kingdom	1,456	Sunk
15 April 1917	Dalmatian	United Kingdom	186	Sunk
15 April 1917	Heikina	Netherlands	157	Sunk
15 April 1917	Sutterton	United Kingdom	160	Sunk
19 April 1917	Poltava	United Kingdom	945	Sunk
20 April 1917	Erith	United Kingdom	168	Sunk
20 April 1917	Grecian	United Kingdom	119	Sunk
21 April 1917	Peik	Norway	701	Sunk
22 April 1917	Nightingale	United Kingdom	91	Sunk
23 April 1917	Auriac	United Kingdom	871	Sunk
23 April 1917	Baron Stjernblad	Denmark	991	Sunk
23 April 1917	Scot	Denmark	1,564	Sunk
28 May 1917	Turid	Norway	1,148	Sunk
30 June 1917	Asalia	Norway	2,348	Sunk
30 June 1917	Phoebus	Kingdom of Italy	3,133	Sunk
6 July 1917	HMS Itchen	Royal Navy	550	Sunk
7 August 1917	HMS Haldon	Royal Navy	810	Damaged

== See also ==
- List of German U-boats
- List of shipwrecks in August 1917
