= SM U-72 =

Submarine serving in the Imperial German Navy in World War I

History

German Empire
- Name: U-72
- Ordered: 6 January 1915
- Builder: AG Vulkan, Hamburg
- Yard number: 56
- Launched: 31 October 1915
- Commissioned: 26 January 1916
- Fate: 1 November 1918 - Scuttled during the evacuation of Cattaro in position 42°30′N 18°41′E

General characteristics
- Class & type: Type UE I submarine
- Displacement: 755 t (743 long tons) surfaced; 832 t (819 long tons) submerged
- Length: 56.80 m (186 ft 4 in) (o/a); 46.66 m (153 ft 1 in) (pressure hull)
- Beam: 5.90 m (19 ft 4 in) (o/a); 5.00 m (16 ft 5 in) (pressure hull)
- Height: 8.25 m (27 ft 1 in)
- Draught: 4.86 m (15 ft 11 in)
- Installed power: 2 × 900 PS (662 kW; 888 shp) surfaced; 2 × 900 PS (662 kW; 888 shp) submerged
- Propulsion: 2 shafts, 2× 1.38 m (4 ft 6 in) propellers
- Speed: 10.6 knots (19.6 km/h; 12.2 mph) surfaced; 7.9 knots (14.6 km/h; 9.1 mph) submerged
- Range: 7,880 nmi (14,590 km; 9,070 mi) at 7 knots (13 km/h; 8.1 mph) surfaced; 83 nmi (154 km; 96 mi) at 4 knots (7.4 km/h; 4.6 mph) submerged
- Test depth: 50 m (164 ft 1 in)
- Complement: 4 officers, 28 enlisted
- Armament: 2 × 50 cm (19.7 in) torpedo tubes (one starboard bow, one starbord stern); 4 torpedoes; 1 × 8.8 cm (3.5 in) SK L/30 deck guns

Service record
- Part of: I Flotilla; 11 April – 17 September 1916; Pola / Mittelmeer / Mittelmeer II Flotilla; 17 September 1916 – 1 November 1918
- Commanders: Kptlt. Ernst Krafft; 28 January 1916 – 17 July 1917; Kptlt. Johannes Feldkirchner; 18 July – 5 November 1917; Oblt.z.S. Erich Schulze; 6 November – 31 December 1917; Oblt.z.S. Hermann Bohm; 1 January – 31 October 1918
- Operations: 4 patrols
- Victories: 18 merchant ships sunk (38,570 GRT); 3 warships sunk (26 tons); 4 merchant ships damaged (21,513 GRT); 1 warship damaged (Unknown tons)

SM U-72 was one of 329 submarines serving in the Imperial German Navy in World War I. U-72 was engaged in the commerce war in First Battle of the Atlantic.

== Design ==
Type UE I submarines were preceded by the longer Type U 66 submarines. U-72 had a displacement of 755 tonnes (743 long tons) when at the surface and 832 tonnes (819 long tons) while submerged. She had a total length of 56.80 m (186 ft 4 in), a pressure hull length of 46.66 m (153 ft 1 in), a beam of 5.90 m (19 ft 4 in), a height of 8.25 m (27 ft 1 in), and a draught of 4.86 m (15 ft 11 in). The submarine was powered by two 900 metric horsepower (660 kW; 890 shp) engines for use while surfaced, and two 900 metric horsepower (660 kW; 890 shp) engines for use while submerged. She had two propeller shafts. She was capable of operating at depths of up to 50 metres (160 ft).

The submarine had a maximum surface speed of 10.6 knots (19.6 km/h; 12.2 mph) and a maximum submerged speed of 7.9 knots (14.6 km/h; 9.1 mph). When submerged, she could operate for 83 nautical miles (154 km; 96 mi) at 4 knots (7.4 km/h; 4.6 mph); when surfaced, she could travel 7,880 nautical miles (14,590 km; 9,070 mi) at 7 knots (13 km/h; 8.1 mph). U-72 was fitted with two 50 centimetres (20 in) torpedo tubes (one at the port bow and one starboard stern), four torpedoes, and one 8.8 centimetres (3.46 in) deck gun. She had a complement of thirty-two (twenty-eight crew members and four officers).

== Operations ==
U-72 left the stocks at Hamburg (AG Vulcan) in March 1916, joined the Kiel School, and first entered North Sea on 11 April 1916. Attached 1st Half Flotilla, under the command of Kaptlt. Krafft.

- 15–21 April 1916. Cruise in North Sea. Returned with defects.
- 23–2 May 1916. ? Cruise in North Sea.
- 21 June to 4 July 1916. Northabout. Laid mines off Cape Wrath.
- 20 August - ? 15 September 1916. Northabout to Mediterranean. Laid mines off Lisbon, Oran and Cape Blanc. On arriving at Cattaro joined the Pola-Cattaro Flotilla.
- Of U-72's operations in the Mediterranean, little is known after her arrival in September 1916.
- On a cruise from the middle of February 1917 until 6 March 1917, she sank 4 steamers and stopped British hospital ship, Dunluce Castle. She damaged SS Megantic and was later unsuccessfully attacked by armed trawlers.
- U-72 was reported as not having cruised, with the above exception, after January 1917, and was regarded as a lame duck. Indeed of her class, U-71 to U-80 (all minelayers), U-80 was the only boat not continually in dockyard hands. At the end of October 1918, U-72 was blown up at evacuation of Cattaro.

== Summary of raiding history ==
| Date | Name | Nationality | Tonnage (Note: Merchant ship tonnages are in gross register tons. Military vessels are listed by tons displacement.) | Fate |
|---|---|---|---|---|
| 7 September 1916 | Achaia | United Kingdom | 2,733 | Sunk |
| 7 September 1916 | Hiso | Norway | 1,562 | Sunk |
| 7 September 1916 | HMS Doreen | Royal Navy | 9 | Sunk |
| 7 September 1916 | HMS Allegro | Royal Navy | 7 | Sunk |
| 7 September 1916 | HMS Griffin | Royal Navy | 10 | Sunk |
| 7 September 1916 | HMS Puffin | Royal Navy | Unknown | Damaged |
| 19 November 1916 | Maria Di Pompei | Italy | 286 | Sunk |
| 23 November 1916 | Margherita F. | Italy | 44 | Sunk |
| 26 November 1916 | Christoforos | Greece | 3,674 | Sunk |
| 27 November 1916 | Salvatore Ciampa | Italy | 1,728 | Sunk |
| 2 December 1916 | Palermo | Italy | 9,203 | Sunk |
| 11 December 1916 | Jeanne | Italy | 534 | Sunk |
| 14 December 1916 | Caledonia | United Kingdom | 7,572 | Damaged |
| 3 June 1917 | Manin B. | Italy | 249 | Sunk |
| 7 June 1917 | Errington Court | United Kingdom | 4,461 | Damaged |
| 8 June 1917 | Cheltonian | United Kingdom | 4,426 | Sunk |
| 8 June 1917 | Felicina | Italy | 165 | Sunk |
| 9 June 1917 | Bravore | Norway | 1,650 | Sunk |
| 9 June 1917 | General Laurie | United Kingdom | 238 | Sunk |
| 9 June 1917 | Montebello | Italy | 2,603 | Sunk |
| 13 June 1917 | Santo | Italy | 622 | Sunk |
| 13 June 1917 | Biagio | Italy | 276 | Sunk |
| 25 June 1917 | Southern | United Kingdom | 5,694 | Damaged |
| 7 July 1917 | Shigizan Maru | Japan | 2,828 | Sunk |
| 1 August 1917 | Rokeby | United Kingdom | 3,786 | Damaged |
| 4 August 1917 | British Monarch | United Kingdom | 5,749 | Sunk |

== Bibliography ==
- Gröner, Erich; Jung, Dieter; Maass, Martin (1991). U-boats and Mine Warfare Vessels. German Warships 1815–1945. Vol. 2. Translated by Thomas, Keith; Magowan, Rachel. London: Conway Maritime Press. ISBN 0-85177-593-4.
