= Small nucleolar RNA SNORA72 =

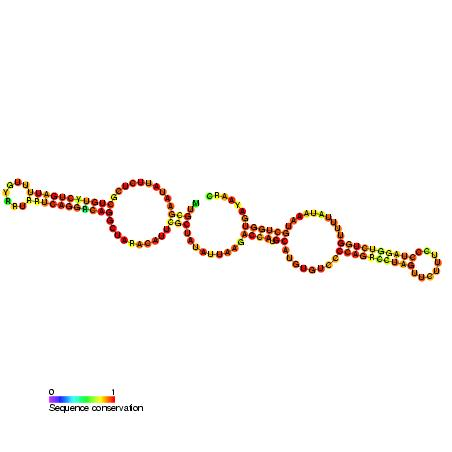
- Predicted secondary structure and sequence conservation of SNORA72

Identifiers
- Symbol: SNORA72
- Alt. Symbols: U72
- Rfam: RF00139

Other data
- RNA type: Gene; snRNA; snoRNA; H/ACA-box
- Domain: Eukaryota
- GO: GO:0006396 GO:0005730
- SO: SO:0000594
- PDB structures: PDBe

In molecular biology, small nucleolar RNA SNORA72 (also known as U72) is a non-coding RNA (ncRNA) molecule which functions in the biogenesis (modification) of other small nuclear RNAs (snRNAs). This type of modifying RNA is located in the nucleolus of the eukaryotic cell which is a major site of snRNA biogenesis. It is known as a small nucleolar RNA (snoRNA) and also often referred to as a "guide RNA".

ACA30 was originally cloned from HeLa cells and belongs to the H/ACA box class of snoRNAs as it has the predicted hairpin-hinge-hairpin-tail structure, has the conserved H/ACA-box motifs and is found associated with GAR1 protein. snoRNA ACA72 is predicted to guide the pseudouridylation of U55 of 5.8S ribosomal RNA (rRNA). Pseudouridylation is the (isomerisation of the nucleoside uridine) to the different isomeric form pseudouridine.
