= List of shipwrecks in February 1917 =

The list of shipwrecks in February 1917 includes ships sunk, foundered, grounded, or otherwise lost during February 1917.

== 1 February ==
List of shipwrecks: 1 February 1917
Ship	State	Description
Ada	United Kingdom	World War I: The fishing smack was scuttled in the Atlantic Ocean 40 nautical miles (74 km) north north west of Trevose Head, Cornwall by SM U-55 (Imperial German Navy). Her crew survived.
Butron	Spain	World War I: The cargo ship was scuttled in the Bay of Biscay 90 nautical miles (170 km) off Punta Galea, Biscay (44°53′N 3°52′W) by SM U-67 (Imperial German Navy). Her crew survived.
Essonite	United Kingdom	World War I: The coaster was torpedoed and sunk in the Atlantic Ocean 3 nautical miles (5.6 km) north north west of Trevose Head (50°35′N 5°04′W) by SM U-55 (Imperial German Navy) with the loss of ten crew.
Gamma	Netherlands	World War I: The cargo ship was torpedoed and sunk in the Atlantic Ocean off Land's End, Cornwall (51°08′N 6°56′W) by SM UC-46 (Imperial German Navy). Her crew were rescued by Vondel (Netherlands).
Ida Duncan	United Kingdom	The tug foundered in Tees Bay with the loss of six of her crew.
Inverlyon	United Kingdom	World War I: The fishing smack was shelled and sunk in the Atlantic Ocean 15 nautical miles (28 km) north by west of Trevose Head (50°47′N 5°05′W) by SM U-55 (Imperial German Navy). Her crew survived.
Jerv	Norway	World War I: The cargo ship was torpedoed and sunk in the North Sea 10 nautical miles (19 km) north of Flamborough Head, Yorkshire, United Kingdom (54°16′N 0°09′E) by SM UC-32 (Imperial German Navy). Her crew survived.
Pilot	Unknown	The steamer left Salina Cruz, Mexico for Ocus, Guatemala and disappeared.
Portia	Norway	World War I: The cargo ship struck a mine and sank in the North Sea off Flamborough Head (53°45′N 0°19′E). Her crew survived.
Sainte Hélène	France	World War I: The cargo ship struck a mine and sank in the Bay of Biscay 2 nautical miles (3.7 km) off the La Coubre Lighthouse, Charente-Maritime. Her crew survived.

== 2 February ==
List of shipwrecks: 2 February 1917
Ship	State	Description
HMT Cotsmuir	Royal Navy	The naval trawler foundered in the North Sea with the loss of all thirteen crew.
Elikon	Greece	World War I: The cargo ship was sunk in the Atlantic Ocean west of Cape Penas, Spain (43°44′N 6°16′W) by SM U-67 (Imperial German Navy). Her crew survived.
Gabrielle	France	World War I: The cargo ship was sunk in the English Channel 25 nautical miles (46 km) west north west of Cap d'Antifer, Seine-Inférieure by SM UB-23 (Imperial German Navy).
Garnet Hill	Russia	World War I: The four-masted barque was scuttled in the Atlantic Ocean off the coast of Ireland (51°10′N 11°40′W) by SM U-45 (Imperial German Navy). A German crew member was taken on board U-45.
HMT G.S.P.	Royal Navy	The naval drifter/net vessel was lost in a collision off the Owers Lightship (United Kingdom).
HMT Holdene	Royal Navy	World War I: The 125-foot (38 m), 274-ton Anti-Aircraft naval trawler struck a mine placed by SM UC-11 (Imperial German Navy) and sank in the North Sea east of the Shipwash Lightship (United Kingdom) (52°01′N 1°54′E) off Orford Ness with the loss of seven of her crew.
Isle of Arran	United Kingdom	World War I: The full-rigged ship was scuttled in the Atlantic Ocean 100 nautical miles (190 km) south of the Old Head of Kinsale, County Cork (50°15′N 7°05′W) by SM UC-46 (Imperial German Navy). Her crew survived.
Loch Broom	United Kingdom	The four-masted barque was sunk by German submarine SM U-81 (Imperial German Navy) at 50°10′N 10°10′W.
Odin	Norway	World War I: The cargo ship was sunk in the Atlantic Ocean 20 nautical miles (37 km) north of the Créac'h Lighthouse, Ouessant, Finistère, France by SM U-53 (Imperial German Navy) with the loss of two crew.
Pomoschnick	Russia	World War I: The brigantine was scuttled in the Atlantic Ocean 50 nautical miles (93 km) south west of the Fastnet Rock by SM U-55 (Imperial German Navy). Her crew survived.
Songdal	Norway	World War I: The four-masted barque was scuttled in the Atlantic Ocean south west of Ireland (50°10′N 10°15′W) by SM U-81 (Imperial German Navy). Her crew survived.
Uhlenhorst	Imperial German Navy	World War I: The Grasbrook-class Vorpostenboot was sunk by mines off Helgoland.
Unknown naval trawler	Royal Navy	World War I: A naval trawler was reportedly sunk by a mine while attempting to notify Usona (United States) that she was entering a mine field 15–16 miles (24–26 km) from Le Havre, France.

== 3 February ==
List of shipwrecks: 3 February 1917
Ship	State	Description
Antonin	France	World War I: The barque was captured and sunk by SMS Seeadler (Imperial German Navy) off Brazil.
Belford	United Kingdom	World War I: The full-rigged ship was scuttled in the Atlantic Ocean 110 nautical miles (200 km) west of the Fastnet Rock (50°34′N 12°16′W) by SM U-45 (Imperial German Navy). Her crew survived.
Confiante	France	World War I: The sailing vessel was sunk in the English Channel 16 nautical miles (30 km) north of the Île de Batz, Finistère (49°04′N 4°10′W) by SM UB-18 (Imperial German Navy). Her crew survived.
Eavestone	United Kingdom	World War I: The collier was shelled and sunk in the Atlantic Ocean 95 nautical miles (176 km) west of the Fastnet Rock (approximately 51°N 12°W) by SM U-45 (Imperial German Navy) with the loss of five crew.
Goeland	France	World War I: The schooner was sunk in the English Channel 6 nautical miles (11 km) off Triagoz, Côtes-du-Nord (49°04′N 4°10′W) by SM UB-18 (Imperial German Navy).
Hollinside	United Kingdom	World War I: The cargo ship was torpedoed and sunk in the Atlantic Ocean 115 nautical miles (213 km) west south west of the Fastnet Rock by SM U-43 (Imperial German Navy) with the loss of a crew member.
Housatonic	United States	World War I: The cargo ship was captured and sunk with explosives in the Atlantic Ocean 20 nautical miles (37 km) south of the Bishop Rock, Isles of Scilly, United Kingdom (49°35′N 6°08′W) by SM U-53 (Imperial German Navy). Her crew was rescued by trawler HMS Salvator (Royal Navy).
Lars Kruse	Denmark	World War I: The cargo ship was sunk in the Atlantic Ocean 16 nautical miles (30 km) north of Ouessant by SM UB-18 (Imperial German Navy) with the loss of seventeen crew.
Port Adelaide	United Kingdom	World War I: The cargo ship was torpedoed and sunk in the Atlantic Ocean 180 nautical miles (330 km) south west of the Fastnet Rock (48°49′N 11°40′W) by SM U-81 (Imperial German Navy). Her crew survived, but her captain was taken as a prisoner of war.
Sainte Marie	France	World War I: The sailing vessel was sunk in the English Channel 12 nautical miles (22 km) north of the Île de Batz by SM UB-18 (Imperial German Navy).
Songelv	Norway	World War I: The full-rigged ship was sunk in the Atlantic Ocean west south west of the Fastnet Rock (50°20′N 11°10′W) by SM U-43 (Imperial German Navy). Her crew survived.
Tamara	Norway	World War I: The sailing vessel was sunk in the Atlantic Ocean 100 nautical miles (190 km) west south west of the Fastnet Rock (50°26′N 12°15′W) by SM U-54 (Imperial German Navy). Her crew survived.
Wasdale	Norway	World War I: The full-rigged ship was sunk in the Atlantic Ocean west south west of the Fastnet Rock (50°22′N 11°53′W) by SM U-43 (Imperial German Navy). Her crew survived.

== 4 February ==
List of shipwrecks: 4 February 1917
Ship	State	Description
Aimée Maria	France	World War I: The barque was sunk in the Atlantic Ocean off the Isles of Scilly, United Kingdom (49°27′N 6°40′W) by SM U-53 (Imperial German Navy). Her crew survived.
Anna Maria	France	World War I: The barquentine was sunk in the English Channel (49°37′N 5°10′W) by SM U-83 (Imperial German Navy). Her crew survived.
Bangphutis	Russia	World War I: The sailing vessel was sunk in the Atlantic Ocean south west of the Isles of Scilly (49°35′N 6°25′W) by SM U-53 (Imperial German Navy).
Cerera	Russia	World War I: The cargo ship was sunk in the Atlantic Ocean 30 nautical miles (56 km) north of the Stiff Lighthouse, Ouessant, Finistère, France by SM UB-18 (Imperial German Navy).
Charlotte W. Miller	United States	The schooner went ashore near Marquesas Keys off Key West, Florida. Refloated and returned to service.
Coquette	France	World War I: The topsail schooner was sunk in the English Channel 28 nautical miles (52 km) south of The Lizard, Cornwall, United Kingdom by SM U-83 (Imperial German Navy).
Dauntless	United Kingdom	World War I: The cargo ship was scuttled in the Bay of Biscay 10 nautical miles (19 km) off Pointe de la Coubre, Gironde, France (45°36′N 1°10′W) by SM UB-39 (Imperial German Navy) with the loss of fifteen crew. Four survivors were rescued by the fishing vessel Mamelena (Spain).
Eridania	Italy	World War I: The cargo ship was sunk in the Atlantic Ocean 96 nautical miles (178 km) south west of the Fastnet Rock by SM U-45 (Imperial German Navy). Her crew survived.
Floridian	United Kingdom	World War I: The cargo ship was torpedoed and sunk in the Atlantic Ocean 200 nautical miles (370 km) west by north of the Fastnet Rock (50°42′N 14°39′W) by SM U-54 (Imperial German Navy) with the loss of five crew. Three survivors were taken as prisoners of war.
Ghazee	United Kingdom	World War I: The cargo ship was torpedoed and damaged in the Atlantic Ocean 2 nautical miles (3.7 km) south south west of Galley Head, County Cork by SM U-60 (Imperial German Navy). She was beached but was declared a total loss. Her crew survived.
Maria	Italy	World War I: The barque was sunk in the Atlantic Ocean 150 nautical miles (280 km) south west of the Fastnet Rock (49°40′N 11°50′W) by SM U-81 (Imperial German Navy).
Marthe	France	World War I: The schooner was scuttled in the Atlantic Ocean 18 nautical miles (33 km) south south east of the Isles of Scilly (49°42′N 6°00′W) by SM UC-45 (Imperial German Navy). Her crew survived.
Palm Leaf	United Kingdom	World War I: The tanker was torpedoed and sunk in the Atlantic Ocean 230 nautical miles (430 km) west of the Fastnet Rock (approximately 51°N 15°W) by SM U-54 (Imperial German Navy). Her crew survived, but two of them were taken as prisoners of war.
Solbakken	Norway	World War I: The cargo ship was scuttled in the Atlantic Ocean 60 nautical miles (110 km) south west of Ouessant by SM UC-24 (Imperial German Navy) with the loss of fifteen of her crew.
Thor II	Norway	World War I: The barque was torpedoed and sunk in the Atlantic Ocean 80 nautical miles (150 km) west of Ireland (50°18′N 11°48′W) by SM U-45 (Imperial German Navy). Her crew survived, three people were rescued by U-45.
Turino	United Kingdom	World War I: The cargo ship was torpedoed and sunk in the Atlantic Ocean 174 nautical miles (322 km) west of the Fastnet Rock (50°25′N 13°50′W) by SM U-43 (Imperial German Navy) with the loss of four crew.

== 5 February ==
List of shipwrecks: 5 February 1917
Ship	State	Description
Anna Prosper	Belgium	World War I: The fishing vessel was sunk in the North Sea off the coast of Norfolk, United Kingdom by SM UB-40 (Imperial German Navy).
Azul	United Kingdom	World War I: The cargo ship was torpedoed and sunk in the Atlantic Ocean 180 nautical miles (330 km) west of the Fastnet Rock by SM U-54 (Imperial German Navy) with the loss of eleven crew.
Bråvalla	Sweden	World War I: The cargo ship was sunk in the Atlantic Ocean off the Isles of Scilly, United Kingdom (49°40′N 6°45′W) by SM U-53 (Imperial German Navy). Her crew survived.
Emerald	United Kingdom	World War I: The fishing vessel was shelled and sunk in the North Sea off Norfolk by SM UB-40 (Imperial German Navy). Her crew survived.
Hurstwood	United Kingdom	World War I: The cargo ship was torpedoed and sunk in the North Sea six nautical miles (11 km) north east of Whitby, Yorkshire (54°35′N 0°35′W) by SM UB-34 (Imperial German Navy) with the loss of four of her crew.
Iowa	United States	The schooner barge, in tow of Covington (United States), sank in a gale and snowstorm off Highlands, New Jersey. Lost with all five hands.
Kennebec	United States	The schooner barge, in tow of Covington (United States), sank in a gale and snowstorm off Highlands, New Jersey. The crew were rescued by Covington.
Lorton	Peru	World War I: The barque was scuttled in the Bay of Biscay 11 nautical miles (20 km) east of Santander, Cantabria, Spain by SM U-67 (Imperial German Navy). Her crew survived.
Lux	United Kingdom	World War I: The tanker was sunk in the Atlantic Ocean 50 nautical miles (93 km) west of Mizen Head, County Cork by SM U-60 (Imperial German Navy) with the loss of all 29 crew.
Primrose	United Kingdom	World War I: The trawler struck a mine placed by SM UC-29 (Imperial German Navy) and sank in the North Sea 17 nautical miles (31 km) south south west of Tod Head, Aberdeenshire with the loss of nine of her crew.
Resolute	United Kingdom	World War I: The fishing vessel was shelled and sunk in the North Sea 64 nautical miles (119 km) east by south of St Abb's Head, Berwickshire (55°56′N 0°15′W) by SM UB-22 (Imperial German Navy). Her crew survived.
Vestra	United Kingdom	World War I: The cargo ship was sunk in the North Sea (54°46′N 1°07′W) by SM UB-35 (Imperial German Navy) with the loss of two of her crew.
Warley Pickering	United Kingdom	World War I: The cargo ship was torpedoed and sunk in the Atlantic Ocean 46 nautical miles (85 km) west by north of the Fastnet Rock by SM U-60 (Imperial German Navy). Her crew survived.
Wartenfels	United Kingdom	World War I: The cargo ship was torpedoed and sunk in the Atlantic Ocean 120 nautical miles (220 km) south west of the Fastnet Rock (50°10′N 11°59′W) by SM U-81 (Imperial German Navy) with the loss of two of her crew. Her captain was taken as a prisoner of war.
Yvonne	France	World War I: The trawler was shelled and sunk in the Bay of Biscay 20 nautical miles (37 km) west of Arcachon, Gironde by SM UB-39 (Imperial German Navy) with the loss of three of her crew.

== 6 February ==
List of shipwrecks: 6 February 1917
Ship	State	Description
Adelaide	United Kingdom	World War I: The trawler was sunk in the North Sea 30 nautical miles (56 km) east north east of the mouth of the River Tyne by SM UB-22 (Imperial German Navy). Her crew survived.
Balgownie	United Kingdom	World War I: The cargo ship struck a mine placed by SM UC-7 (Imperial German Navy) and sank in the Thames Estuary (51°46′N 1°32′E) with the loss of a crew member.
Cliftonian	United Kingdom	World War I: The collier was torpedoed and sunk in the Atlantic Ocean 4.5 nautical miles (8.3 km) south by east of Galley Head, County Cork (51°28′N 8°55′W) by SM U-85 (Imperial German Navy). Her crew survived.
Crown Point	United Kingdom	World War I: The cargo ship was torpedoed and sunk in the Atlantic Ocean 55 nautical miles (102 km) west of the Isles of Scilly (50°06′N 7°46′W) by SM U-83 (Imperial German Navy) with the loss of seven of her crew.
Ellavore	Norway	World War I: The cargo ship was sunk in the Atlantic Ocean 35 nautical miles (65 km) north of Cap Villano, Spain by SM UC-24 (Imperial German Navy). Her crew survived.
Ferruccio	Italy	World War I: The cargo ship was sunk in the North Sea off Whitby, Yorkshire, United Kingdom by SM UB-34 (Imperial German Navy).
Havgard	Norway	World War I: The cargo ship was sunk in the Atlantic Ocean 70 nautical miles (130 km) north east of Cape Villano by SM UC-24 (Imperial German Navy). Her crew survived.
H. P. Co. No. 1	United States	The barge broke loose and went ashore after her tow vessel, Vivo (United States), grounded on rocks in fog in an unknown location.
H. P. Co. No. 5	United States	The barge broke loose and went ashore after her tow vessel, Vivo (United States), grounded on rocks in fog in an unknown location.
HMT Longset	Royal Navy	World War I: The naval trawler struck a mine placed by SM UC-46 (Imperial German Navy) and sank in the Bristol Channel off Barry Island, Glamorgan with the loss of eight of her crew.
Perseo	Regia Marina	The Pegaso-class torpedo boat collided with Astore (Regia Marina) and sank in the Mediterranean Sea off Stromboli.
Romeo	United Kingdom	World War I: The trawler was scuttled in the North Sea 70 nautical miles (130 km) east of Berwick-upon-Tweed, Northumberland (56°50′N 0°00′E) by SM UB-22 (Imperial German Navy). Her crew survived.
Rupert	United Kingdom	World War I: The trawler was scuttled in the North Sea 42 nautical miles (78 km) east north east of the mouth of the River Tyne by SM UB-22 (Imperial German Navy). Her crew survived.
Saxon Briton	United Kingdom	World War I: The cargo ship was torpedoed and sunk in the Atlantic Ocean 3 nautical miles (5.6 km) north north east of Gurnard's Head, Cornwall (50°13′N 5°35′W) by SM U-55 (Imperial German Navy) with the loss of two of her crew.
Vivo	United States	The motor vessel grounded on rocks in fog in an unknown location.

== 7 February ==
List of shipwrecks: 7 February 1917
Ship	State	Description
Aphrodite	France	World War I: The sailing vessel was sunk in the Mediterranean Sea north west of Alexandria, Egypt by SM U-38 (Imperial German Navy). Her crew survived.
Boyne Castle	United Kingdom	World War I: The coaster was shelled and sunk in the North Sea 12 nautical miles (22 km) north east of St Abb's Head, Berwickshire by SM UB-22 (Imperial German Navy). Her crew survived.
Buenos Aires	Italy	World War I: The full-rigged sailing ship was captured and sunk by SMS Seeadler (Imperial German Navy) off Brazil.
California	United Kingdom	World War I: The ocean liner was torpedoed and sunk in the Atlantic Ocean 38 nautical miles (70 km) west of The Fastnet Rock (51°10′N 9°24′W) by SM U-85 (Imperial German Navy) with the loss of 43 lives.
Corsican Prince	United Kingdom	World War I: The cargo ship was torpedoed and sunk in the North Sea 3 nautical miles (5.6 km) east of Whitby, Yorkshire (54°30′N 0°31′W) by SM UB-34 (Imperial German Navy) with the loss of a crew member.
Diaz	Russia	World War I: The barque was sunk in the Atlantic Ocean south of Ireland(50°05′N 8°43′W) by SM U-83 (Imperial German Navy).
Gravina	United Kingdom	World War I: The cargo ship was torpedoed and sunk in the Atlantic Ocean 85 nautical miles (157 km) west of the Fastnet Rock (51°03′N 11°30′W) by SM U-81 (Imperial German Navy) with the loss of seven of her crew. Five survivors were taken as prisoners of war.
Hans Kinck	Norway	World War I: The cargo ship was sunk in the North Sea off the Noordhinder Lightship (Netherlands) by SM UC-39 (Imperial German Navy). Her crew survived.
Noella	French Navy	World War I: The naval trawler struck a mine placed by SM UC-26 (Imperial German Navy) and sank in the English Channel 5 nautical miles (9.3 km) off Le Havre, Seine-Inférieure.
Saint Ninian	United Kingdom	World War I: The cargo ship was torpedoed and sunk in the North Sea off Whitby (54°30′N 0°32′W) by SM UB-34 (Imperial German Navy) with the loss of fifteen crew.
Saxonian	United Kingdom	World War I: The tanker was shelled and sunk in the Atlantic Ocean 270 nautical miles (500 km) west by north of the Fastnet Rock (50°26′N 16°26′W) by SM U-54 (Imperial German Navy) with the loss of a crew member.
Shakespeare	United Kingdom	World War I: The trawler was torpedoed and sunk in the North Sea off the Firth of Forth by SM UB-22 (Imperial German Navy) with the loss of nine crew.
Storskog	Norway	World War I: The full-rigged ship was sunk in the Atlantic Ocean 70 nautical miles (130 km) south west of the Fastnet Rock by SM U-60 (Imperial German Navy). Her crew survived.
Väring	Sweden	World War I: The cargo ship was sunk in the North Sea 10 nautical miles (19 km) east north east of Noup Head, Orkney Islands, United Kingdom by SM U-78 (Imperial German Navy). Her crew survived.
Vedamore	United Kingdom	World War I: The cargo ship was torpedoed and sunk in the Atlantic Ocean 20 nautical miles (37 km) west of the Fastnet Rock (51°17′N 10°03′W) by SM U-85 (Imperial German Navy) with the loss of 23 of her crew.
Wallace	United Kingdom	World War I: The cargo ship was shelled and damaged in the Atlantic Ocean (50°30′N 15°05′W by SM U-54 (Imperial German Navy) with the loss of a crew member and another taken as a prisoner of war Survivors abandoned ship and were rescued by a Royal Navy warship.
Yola	United Kingdom	World War I: The cargo ship was sunk in the Atlantic Ocean west of Ouessant, Finistère, France by SM U-55 (Imperial German Navy) with the loss of all 33 crew.

== 8 February ==
List of shipwrecks: 8 February 1917
Ship	State	Description
HMT Aivern	Royal Navy	The naval trawler was sunk in the Western Approaches.
Derika	Netherlands	World War I: The trawler was scuttled in the North Sea (52°53′N 3°20′E) by SM UC-33 (Imperial German Navy). Her crew survived.
Elswick Manor	United Kingdom	World War I: The cargo ship struck a mine placed by SM UC-7 (Imperial German Navy) and was damaged in the North Sea 4 nautical miles (7.4 km) off Southwold, Suffolk. She was beached at Great Yarmouth, Norfolk. Subsequently refloated, repaired and returned to service.
Guillame Tell	France	World War I: The brigantine was scuttled in the Atlantic Ocean 10 nautical miles (19 km) west of Trevose Head, Cornwall, United Kingdom by SM UC-65 (Imperial German Navy).
HMS Gurkha	Royal Navy	World War I: The Tribal-class destroyer struck a mine placed by SM UC-47 (Imperial German Navy) and sank in the English Channel off Dungeness, Kent (50°51′20″N 0°53′17″E). There were five survivors out of her 79 crew.
Hanna Larsen	United Kingdom	World War I: The cargo ship was scuttled in the North Sea 20 nautical miles (37 km) east by north of Spurn Point, Yorkshire (53°42′N 0°39′E) by SM UC-39 (Imperial German Navy) with the loss of a crew member.
Ida	Norway	World War I: The cargo ship was sunk in the North Sea 15 nautical miles (28 km) south east of Flamborough Head, Yorkshire by SM UC-39 (Imperial German Navy) with the loss of two of her crew.
Lullington	United Kingdom	World War I: The collier struck a mine placed by SM UC-47 (Imperial German Navy) and sank in the English Channel 3 nautical miles (5.6 km) east of the Royal Sovereign Lightship (United Kingdom) (50°43′N 0°32′E). Her crew survived.
SMS M56	Imperial German Navy	World War I: The Type 1915 minesweeper struck a mine and sank in the North Sea.
Mary Ann	United Kingdom	World War I: The fishing vessel was scuttled in the Atlantic Ocean 18 nautical miles (33 km) north north east of St. Ives Head, Cornwall by SM UC-65 (Imperial German Navy). Her crew survived.
SM UC-39	Imperial German Navy	World War I: The Type UC II submarine was depth charged, shelled and sunk in the North Sea off Flamborough Head (53°56′N 0°05′E) by HMS Thrasher (Royal Navy) with the loss of seven of her crew.
SM UC-46	Imperial German Navy	World War I: The Type UC II submarine was rammed and sunk in the English Channel off the Goodwin Sands, Kent, United Kingdom (51°07′N 1°39′E) by HMS Liberty (Royal Navy) with the loss of all 26 crew.

== 9 February ==
List of shipwrecks: 9 February 1917
Ship	State	Description
Benbow	United Kingdom	World War I: The fishing vessel was scuttled in the North Sea 15 nautical miles (28 km) off Inchcape, Forfarshire by SM UB-22 (Imperial German Navy). Her crew survived.
Duke of York	United Kingdom	World War I: The trawler was scuttled in the North Sea 34 nautical miles (63 km) east by south of Girdle Ness, Aberdeenshire by SM UB-22 (Imperial German Navy). Her crew survived.
Mantola	United Kingdom	World War I: The cargo liner sank after being torpedoed the previous day in the Atlantic Ocean southwest of Ireland 143 nautical miles (265 km) off Fastnet Rock (49°55′N 12°25′W) by U-81 (Imperial German Navy). Seven crew were killed while abandoning ship. Survivors were rescued by HMS Laburnum (Royal Navy).
Marianne	Netherlands	World War I: The fishing lugger was sunk in the North Sea off the Terschelling Bank Lightship (Netherlands) (52°30′N 3°10′E) by SM U-53 (Imperial German Navy). Her eight crew survived.
HMT Yesso	Royal Navy	World War I: The naval trawler struck a mine placed by SM UC-29 (Imperial German Navy) and sank at Aberdeen (57°09′N 2°03′W) with the loss of seven of her crew.

== 10 February ==
List of shipwrecks: 10 February 1917
Ship	State	Description
Athenian	United Kingdom	World War I: The trawler was scuttled in the North Sea 105 nautical miles (194 km) east by south of Aberdeen (57°20′N 1°30′E) by SM UB-22 (Imperial German Navy). Her crew survived.
Beechtree	United Kingdom	World War I: The cargo ship was torpedoed and sunk in the English Channel 11 nautical miles (20 km) south east of Start Point, Devon (50°08′N 3°23′W) by SM UC-21 (Imperial German Navy). Her fifteen crew survived.
Bellax	United Kingdom	World War I: The cargo ship was sunk in the North Sea 10 nautical miles (19 km) south east of the Isle of May, Fife, United Kingdom by SM UB-22 (Imperial German Navy). Her crew survived.
HMT Gracie	Royal Navy	The naval trawler was lost on this date.
Ireland	United Kingdom	World War I: The trawler was shelled and sunk in the North Sea 105 nautical miles (194 km) off Girdle Ness, Aberdeenshire (57°10′N 1°10′E) by SM UB-22 (Imperial German Navy). Her crew survived.
Japanese Prince	United Kingdom	World War I: The cargo ship was torpedoed and sunk in the Atlantic Ocean 24 nautical miles (44 km) south west of Bishop Rock, Isles of Scilly (49°36′N 6°46′W) by SM UC-47 (Imperial German Navy). Her crew survived.
Netherlee	United Kingdom	World War I: The cargo ship was torpedoed and sunk in the Atlantic Ocean 92 nautical miles (170 km) west of the Fastnet Rock (50°44′N 11°45′W) by SM U-81 (Imperial German Navy) with the loss of two of her crew.
Ostrich	United Kingdom	World War I: The trawler was shelled and sunk in the North Sea 135 nautical miles (250 km) off the Longstone Lighthouse, Farne Islands by SM U-45 (Imperial German Navy). Her crew survived.
Paquerette	France	World War I: The schooner was sunk in the Atlantic Ocean 35 nautical miles (65 km) off Ouessant, Finistère by SM U-83 (Imperial German Navy). Her crew survived.
Rancagua	France	World War I: The full-rigged ship was sunk in the Bay of Biscay (46°20′N 5°30′W) by SM UB-39 (Imperial German Navy). Her crew took to the lifeboats but were not recovered.
Sallagh	United Kingdom	World War I: The coaster was scuttled in the Irish Sea off Bardsey Island, Pembrokeshire by SM UC-65 (Imperial German Navy) with the loss of a crew member.

== 11 February ==
List of shipwrecks: 11 February 1917
Ship	State	Description
Ada	United Kingdom	World War I: The brigantine was shelled and sunk in the English Channel 8 nautical miles (15 km) south of Anvil Point, Dorset by SM UC-66 (Imperial German Navy). Her crew survived.
Ashwold	United Kingdom	World War I: The fishing vessel was shelled and sunk in the North Sea 130 nautical miles (240 km) north east by north of North Shields, Northumberland by SM UC-44 (Imperial German Navy). Her crew survived, but her captain was taken as a prisoner of war.
Assunta	Italy	World War I: The sailing vessel was sunk in the Mediterranean Sea 40 nautical miles (74 km) south of Cape Carbonara, Sardinia (38°30′N 9°30′E) by SM U-35 (Imperial German Navy).
Dalmata	Norway	World War I: The cargo ship was sunk in the Atlantic Ocean 25 nautical miles (46 km) north west of the Bishop Rock, Isles of Scilly, United Kingdom (49°56′N 5°32′W) by SM UB-38 (Imperial German Navy) with the loss of a crew member.
Dernes	Norway	World War I: The coaster was sunk in the Atlantic Ocean 18 nautical miles (33 km) north west of Ouessant, Finistère, France (48°40′N 5°25′W) by SM UC-21 (Imperial German Navy). Her crew survived.
Lycia	United Kingdom	World War I: The cargo ship was scuttled in the Irish Sea 20 nautical miles (37 km) east by north of the South Bishop Lighthouse, Pembrokeshire (52°12′N 5°27′W) by SM UC-65 (Imperial German Navy). Her crew survived.
Norwood	United Kingdom	World War I: The coaster was sunk in the North Sea off Aberdeen by SM UC-29 (Imperial German Navy) with the loss of eighteen of her crew.
Olivia	United Kingdom	World War I: The coaster was scuttled in the Irish Sea 21 nautical miles (39 km) south west of Bardsey Island, Pembrokeshire by SM UC-65 (Imperial German Navy). Her crew survived.
Vasilissa Olga	Greece	World War I: the cargo ship was scuttled in the English Channel 4 nautical miles (7.4 km) south of the Owers Lightship (United Kingdom) (50°38′N 0°27′E) by SM UC-66 (Imperial German Navy). Her twenty crew survived.
Voltaire	United Kingdom	World War I: The coaster was scuttled in the Irish Sea 25 nautical miles (46 km) north north east of the Bishops and Clerks Rocks by SM UC-65 (Imperial German Navy). Her crew survived.
Woodfield	United Kingdom	World War I: The cargo ship was torpedoed and damaged in the English Channel 3 nautical miles (5.6 km) off the Royal Sovereign Lightship (United Kingdom) by SM UC-66 (Imperial German Navy). She was beached but was later refloated, repaired and returned to service.

== 12 February ==
List of shipwrecks: 12 February 1917
Ship	State	Description
Adolf	Sweden	World War I: The coaster was sunk in the North Sea off Dennis Head Old Beacon, North Ronaldsay, Orkney Islands, United Kingdom (58°53′N 1°32′W) by SM UC-44 (Imperial German Navy). Her crew survived.
Afric	United Kingdom	World War I: The ocean liner was torpedoed and sunk in the Atlantic Ocean 12 nautical miles (22 km) south south west of the Eddystone Lighthouse (49°59′N 4°18′W) by SM UC-66 (Imperial German Navy) with the loss of five lives.
Aghios Spyridon	Greece	World War I: The cargo ship was torpedoed and sunk in the Bristol Channel 5 nautical miles (9.3 km) off the Pendeen Lighthouse, Cornwall (50°10′N 5°48′W) by SM UC-47 (Imperial German Navy).
Brissons	United Kingdom	World War I: The fishing smack was scuttled in the Atlantic Ocean 9 nautical miles (17 km) west of Trevose Head, Cornwall (50°31′N 5°15′W) by SM UC-47 (Imperial German Navy). Her crew survived.
Cilicia	United Kingdom	World War I: The collier struck a mine and sank in the Atlantic Ocean 5 nautical miles (9.3 km) south of Dassen Island, South Africa.
Dale	United Kingdom	World War I: The fishing vessel was scuttled in the North Sea 42 nautical miles (78 km) south by east of North Ronaldsay by SM UC-44 (Imperial German Navy). Her crew survived, but her captain was taken as a prisoner of war.
HMT Euston	Royal Navy	World War I: The 117.5-foot (35.8 m), 209-ton steam minesweeping naval trawler struck a mine placed by SM UC-30 (Imperial German Navy) and sank in Tees Bay near the Longmoor buoy off Hartlepool (54°40′N 1°19′E) with the loss of 11 of her crew, 2 survivors.
Foreland	United Kingdom	World War I: The collier struck a mine placed by SM UC-11 (Imperial German Navy) and sank in the North Sea 6 nautical miles (11 km) south by west of the Shipwash Lightship (United Kingdom) (51°56′N 1°40′E). Her crew survived.
Hugo Hamilton	Sweden	World War I: The auxiliary sailing vessel was shelled and sunk in the Atlantic Ocean north west of Ireland (55°39′N 12°13′W) by SM U-81 (Imperial German Navy). Her crew were rescued by Rio de la Plata (Norway).
Lucent	United Kingdom	World War I: The collier was shelled and sunk in the English Channel 20 nautical miles (37 km) east of the Lizard, Cornwall (50°20′N 4°43′W) by SM UC-66 (Imperial German Navy). Her crew survived.
Lyman M. Law	United States	World War I: The four-masted schooner was captured and sunk with explosives in the Mediterranean Sea 25 nautical miles (46 km) off Cagliari, Sardinia, Italy by SM U-35 (Imperial German Navy). Her crew was taken to Sardinia and released.
Nordcap	Norway	World War I: The coaster was sunk in the Bay of Biscay 10 nautical miles (19 km) west of La Rochelle, Charente-Maritime, France (46°18′N 1°52′W) by SM UC-21 (Imperial German Navy). Her crew survived.
Pinna	United Kingdom	World War I: The tanker was torpedoed and damaged in the Irish Sea 7.5 nautical miles (13.9 km) south south east of the South Bishop Lighthouse, Pembrokeshire by SM UC-65 (Imperial German Navy). She was beached at Milford Haven and was later refloated.
West	Norway	World War I: The auxiliary schooner was sunk in the North Sea by SM UC-36 (Imperial German Navy). Her crew survived.

== 13 February ==
List of shipwrecks: 13 February 1917
Ship	State	Description
Barnsley	United Kingdom	World War I: The 104-foot (32 m), 144-ton steam trawler was shelled, captured, and scuttled with explosives in the Atlantic Ocean 13 nautical miles (24 km) north of Inishtrahull Island, County Donegal by SM U-78 (Imperial German Navy). Her crew survived, but her Captain and Chief Engineer were taken as prisoners of war.
F. D. Lambert	United Kingdom	World War I: The cargo ship struck a mine placed by SM UC-47 (Imperial German Navy) and sank in the English Channel 1 nautical mile (1.9 km) east of the Royal Sovereign Lightship (United Kingdom). Her crew survived.
Friendship	United Kingdom	World War I: The fishing smack was sunk in the Irish Sea off the Smalls Lighthouse by SM UC-65 (Imperial German Navy) with the loss of four of her crew.
King Alfred	United Kingdom	World War I: The fishing vessel was scuttled in the North Sea 75 nautical miles (139 km) south of Fair Isle by SM UC-44 (Imperial German Navy). Her captain was taken as a prisoner of war.
Percy Roy	United Kingdom	World War I: The schooner was scuttled in the Mediterranean Sea 32 nautical miles (59 km) off Mallorca, Spain by SM U-35 (Imperial German Navy). Her six crew were rescued by Ciudad (Spain).
Progreso	Norway	World War I: The cargo ship was sunk in the Bay of Biscay 11 nautical miles (20 km) off Lacanau, Gironde, France by SM UC-21 (Imperial German Navy). Her crew survived.
HMT Sisters Melville	Royal Navy	World War I: The naval trawler struck a mine placed by SM UC-4 (Imperial German Navy) and sank in the North Sea 4 nautical miles (7.4 km) north east of Aldeburgh, Suffolk (52°07′N 1°44′E) with the loss of seven of her crew.
SMS Staar	Imperial German Navy	The naval drifter/Vorpostenboot was lost on this date.
Zircon	United Kingdom	World War I: The fishing smack was scuttled in the Irish Sea 26 nautical miles (48 km) south west of the Smalls Lighthouse by SM UC-65 (Imperial German Navy). Her crew survived.

== 14 February ==
List of shipwrecks: 14 February 1917
Ship	State	Description
Belvoir Castle	United Kingdom	World War I: The fishing vessel was scuttled in the North Sea south east of Buchan Ness, Aberdeenshire (57°17′N 1°30′W) by SM UC-44 (Imperial German Navy). Her crew survived, but her captain was taken as a prisoner of war.
Edward F. Clark	United States	The schooner barge foundered at anchor off Assateague Light in a storm, a total loss. The crew were rescued by Saratoga (flag unknown) before sinking.
Eudora	United Kingdom	World War I: The four-masted barque was shelled and sunk in the Atlantic Ocean 30 nautical miles (56 km) south south west of the Fastnet Rock by SM UC-33 (Imperial German Navy). Her crew survived.
F8	Italian Royal Navy	The F-class submarine sank in the Ligurian Sea off La Spezia, Italy, during trials. She was refloated and repaired and she returned to service in September 1917.
Ferga	United Kingdom	World War I: The coaster was shelled and sunk in the Irish Sea 15 nautical miles (28 km) south of Bardsey Island, Pembrokeshire (50°02′N 5°04′W) by SM UC-65 (Imperial German Navy). Her crew survived.
SMS Geier	Imperial German Navy	World War I: The auxiliary cruiser was scuttled in the South Atlantic Ocean near Ilha da Trindade.
Greenland	United Kingdom	World War I: The cargo ship was scuttled in the Irish Sea 20 nautical miles (37 km) south west of Bardsey Island (52°30′N 5°05′W) by SM UC-65 (Imperial German Navy). Her crew survived.
Hopemoor	United Kingdom	World War I: The cargo ship was torpedoed and sunk in the Atlantic Ocean 20 nautical miles (37 km) north west of the Skellig Islands (51°53′N 11°00′W) by SM U-60 (Imperial German Navy). Her crew survived.
Inishowen Head	United Kingdom	World War I: The cargo ship struck a mine placed by SM UC-65 (Imperial German Navy) and sank in the Irish Sea 1.25 nautical miles (2.32 km) south of Skokholm, Pembrokeshire (51°40′N 5°15′W) with the loss of a crew member.
Longscar	United Kingdom	World War I: The cargo ship was scuttled in the Bay of Biscay (45°25′N 1°55′W) by SM UC-21 (Imperial German Navy). Her crew survived, but two of them were taken as prisoners of war.
Mar Adriatico	Spain	World War I: The cargo ship was sunk in the Bay of Biscay (45°43′N 1°24′W) by SM UC-21 (Imperial German Navy). Her crew survived.
Margarita	United Kingdom	World War I: The coaster was scuttled in the Irish Sea 20 nautical miles (37 km) south west by west of Bardsey Island by SM UC-65 (Imperial German Navy). Her crew survived.
Marie Leonhardt	United Kingdom	World War I: The cargo ship struck a mine placed by SM UC-11 (Imperial German Navy) and sank in the North Sea 2.5 nautical miles (4.6 km) east of the Sunk Lightship (United Kingdom) (51°53′N 1°40′E) with the loss of five of her crew.
Marthe Yvonne	France	World War I: The pilot boat was sunk in the Bay of Biscay 15 nautical miles (28 km) west south west of La Coubre Point, Charente-Maritime by SM UC-70 (Imperial German Navy). Her crew survived.
Mary Bell	United Kingdom	World War I: The fishing vessel was scuttled in the North Sea 50 nautical miles (93 km) east by north of Aberdeen by SM UC-44 (Imperial German Navy). Her crew survived, but her captain was taken as a prisoner of war.
Mery	Russia	World War I: The schooner was shelled and sunk in the Mediterranean Sea 35 nautical miles (65 km) south east of Alicante, Spain by SM U-35 (Imperial German Navy).
Michele	France	World War I: The sailing vessel was sunk in the Mediterranean Sea off Sicily, Italy by SM U-38 (Imperial German Navy).
Oceania	United Kingdom	World War I: The cargo ship was sunk in the Mediterranean Sea 28 nautical miles (52 km) south of Alicante by SM U-35 (Imperial German Navy).
Torino	Italy	World War I: The passenger ship was sunk in the Ionian Sea (36°23′N 19°10′E) by SM U-39 (Imperial German Navy).

== 15 February ==
List of shipwrecks: 15 February 1917
Ship	State	Description
Afton	United Kingdom	World War I: The passenger ship was scuttled in the Irish Sea 23 nautical miles (43 km) north by east of Strumble Head, Pembrokeshire (52°24′N 5°09′W) by SM UC-65 (Imperial German Navy). Her crew survived.
Aline	France	World War I: The sailing vessel was sunk in the Bay of Biscay 25 nautical miles (46 km) west south west of the La Coubre Lighthouse, Charente-Maritime by SM UC-21 (Imperial German Navy).
Alma Jeanne	France	World War I: The lugger was scuttled in the Bay of Biscay off Les Sables-d'Olonne, Vendée (46°09′N 1°53′W) by SM UC-66 (Imperial German Navy).
Argos	France	World War I: The fishing vessel was shelled and sunk in the Bay of Biscay off Les Sables-d'Olonne (46°19′N 1°59′W) by SM UC-66 (Imperial German Navy). Her five crew survived.
Brecknockshire	United Kingdom	World War I: The cargo ship, on her maiden voyage, was sunk in the Atlantic Ocean 490 nautical miles (910 km) east by north of Cape Frio, Brazil by SMS Möwe (Imperial German Navy). Her crew were taken as prisoners of war.
Desire Louise	France	World War I: The sailing vessel was sunk in the Bay of Biscay (46°09′N 1°43′W) by SM UC-66 (Imperial German Navy).
French Prince	United Kingdom	World War I: The cargo ship was sunk in the Atlantic Ocean 490 nautical miles (910 km) east north east of Cape Frio by SMS Möwe (Imperial German Navy). Her crew were taken as prisoners of war.
Kyanite	United Kingdom	World War I: The coaster was scuttled in the Irish Sea 27 nautical miles (50 km) south south west of Bardsey Island, Pembrokeshire (52°18′N 4°55′W) by SM UC-65 (Imperial German Navy). Her crew survived.
Leven	United Kingdom	World War I: The dredger struck a mine placed by SM UC-16 (Imperial German Navy) and sank in the English Channel 0.75 nautical miles (1,390 m) off Newhaven, Sussex. Her crew survived.
Marion Dawson	United Kingdom	World War I: The cargo ship was scuttled in the Bay of Biscay 8 nautical miles (15 km) south south west of the Île d'Oléron, Charente-Maritime (46°03′N 1°33′W) by SM UC-21 (Imperial German Navy). Her crew survived.
Minas	Italy	World War I: The troopship was sunk in the Ionian Sea off Cape Matapan, Greece (36°25′N 18°24′E) by SM U-39 (Imperial German Navy) with the loss of 870 lives.
Stralsund	Norway	World War I: The coaster was sunk in the Atlantic Ocean west of St. Kilda, Inverness-shire, United Kingdom by SM U-78 (Imperial German Navy). Her crew survived.

== 16 February ==
List of shipwrecks: 16 February 1917
Ship	State	Description
Breim	Norway	The cargo ship collided with a Greek merchant vessel in the Bay of Biscay off Biarritz, Basses-Pyrénées, France and sank. Her crew were rescued.
Eddie	United Kingdom	World War I: The sailing vessel was sunk in the Atlantic Ocean 550 nautical miles (1,020 km) east north east of Cape Frio, Brazil by SMS Möwe (Imperial German Navy). Her crew were taken as prisoners of war.
Hermine	France	World War I: The cargo ship was sunk in the English Channel 15 nautical miles (28 km) off Barfleur, Manche (48°50′N 2°58′W) by SM UC-17 (Imperial German Navy).
Inver	United Kingdom	The cargo ship collided with another vessel and sank in the Irish Sea. Her crew survived.
Lady Ann	United Kingdom	World War I: The cargo ship was torpedoed and sunk in the North Sea 3 nautical miles (5.6 km) east of Scarborough, Yorkshire by SM UB-21 (Imperial German Navy) with the loss of eleven of her crew.
Laertis	Greece	World War I: The cargo ship was sunk in the Mediterranean Sea off Marettimo, Italy by SM UC-38 (Imperial German Navy).
Mayola	United Kingdom	World War I: The schooner was scuttled in the Atlantic Ocean 50 nautical miles (93 km) south east by east of Cape St. Vincent, Portugal (36°53′N 8°26′W) by SM U-21 (Imperial German Navy). Her crew survived.
Niobe	France	World War I: The cargo ship was torpedoed and sunk in the Bay of Biscay 8 nautical miles (15 km) off the Île de Ré, Charente-Maritime (46°14′N 1°49′W) by SM UC-21 (Imperial German Navy) with the loss of ten of her crew.
Oriana	Italy	World War I: The cargo ship was sunk in the Mediterranean Sea 15 nautical miles (28 km) off Alicante, Spain by SM U-35 (Imperial German Navy). Her crew survived.
Pollcrea	United Kingdom	World War I: The cargo ship was shelled and damaged in the Bay of Biscay 3 nautical miles (5.6 km) south of the Île d'Yeu, Vendée, France by SM UC-21 (Imperial German Navy). She was beached at Saint-Gilles-sur-Vie. Later refloated and returned to service.
Prudenza	Italy	World War I: The cargo ship was sunk in the Mediterranean Sea off Alicante by SM U-35 (Imperial German Navy). Her crew survived.
Queenswood	United Kingdom	World War I: The cargo ship was torpedoed and sunk in the Atlantic Ocean 6 nautical miles (11 km) south west of Hartland Point, Devon (50°56′N 4°38′W) by SM UC-65 (Imperial German Navy) with the loss of three of her crew.
HMT Recepto	Royal Navy	World War I: The naval trawler struck a mine placed by UC 30 (Imperial German Navy) and sank in Tees Bay (54°40′N 1°08′W) with the loss of eight of her crew.
Rose Dorothea	United Kingdom	World War I: The fishing schooner was scuttled in the Atlantic Ocean 15 nautical miles (28 km) off Cabo de Santa María, Portugal (36°50′N 8°25′W) by SM U-21 (Imperial German Navy). Her crew survived.
Ville de Bayonne	France	World War I: The cargo ship was sunk in the Atlantic Ocean 6 nautical miles (11 km) west of Hartland Point (51°03′N 4°37′W) by SM UC-65 (Imperial German Navy).

== 17 February ==
List of shipwrecks: 17 February 1917
Ship	State	Description
Ala	Italy	World War I: The sailing vessel was sunk in the Strait of Sicily by SM U-39 (Imperial German Navy).
Athos	France	World War I: The troopship was sunk in the Mediterranean Sea 200 nautical miles (370 km) south east of Malta by SM U-65 (Imperial German Navy) with the loss of 754 lives.
Bayonne	France	World War I: The full-rigged ship was scuttled in the English Channel 25 nautical miles (46 km) off Start Point, Devon, United Kingdom by SM U-84 (Imperial German Navy). Her crew survived.
Cabo	Norway	World War I: The cargo ship was scuttled in the Atlantic Ocean 20 nautical miles (37 km) south west of Ar Men, Finistère, France (48°00′N 5°09′W) by SM UC-21 (Imperial German Navy). Her crew survived.
Dalbeattie	Norway	World War I: The cargo ship was sunk in the Atlantic Ocean 40 nautical miles (74 km) south south west of the Fastnet Rock by SM U-60 (Imperial German Navy). Her crew survived.
Driebergen	Netherlands	World War I: The cargo ship was sunk in the Atlantic Ocean 90 nautical miles (170 km) west of Ouessant, Finistère (48°19′N 7°01′W) by SM UC-66 (Imperial German Navy). Her crew survived.
Emilia I	Portugal	World War I: The sailing vessel was sunk in the Atlantic Ocean west of Portugal by SM U-21 (Imperial German Navy).
Excel	United Kingdom	World War I: The trawler was shelled and sunk in the North Sea 53 nautical miles (98 km) north east of the mouth of the River Tyne by SM UB-21 (Imperial German Navy). Her crew survived.
HMS Farnborough	Royal Navy	World War I: The Q-ship was torpedoed and damaged in the Atlantic Ocean south of Ireland (51°34′N 11°23′W) by SM U-83 (Imperial German Navy). She was subsequently taken in tow and beached at Berehaven, County Cork. Later repaired and returned to service.
Friedrich Kahl	Imperial German Navy	World War I: The Augustenburg-class Vorpostenboot was sunk by mines south west of Fanø.
HMT Hawk	Royal Navy	World War I: The 132.9-foot (40.5 m), 243-ton steam naval trawler was torpedoed and sunk in the Mediterranean Sea 140 nautical miles (260 km) east by south of Malta (34°05′N 16°18′E) by SM U-64 (Imperial German Navy) with the loss of seven people while escorting Okement.
Iolo	United Kingdom	World War I: The cargo ship was torpedoed and sunk in the Atlantic Ocean 40 nautical miles (74 km) south by west of the Fastnet Rock (50°43′N 9°30′W) by SM U-60 (Imperial German Navy) with the loss of two crew. Four survivors were taken as prisoners of war.
Lima	Portugal	World War I: The sailing vessel was sunk in the Atlantic Ocean west of Portugal by SM U-21 (Imperial German Navy).
Okement	United Kingdom	World War I: The 364.8-foot (111.2 m), 4,349-ton collier was torpedoed and sunk in the Mediterranean Sea 140 nautical miles (260 km) south east by south of Malta (34°05′N 16°18′E) by SM U-64 (Imperial German Navy) with the loss of eleven crew. HMT Hawk (Royal Navy) was sunk while trying to assist.
Ootmarsum	Netherlands	World War I: The cargo ship was sunk in the Atlantic Ocean 65 nautical miles (120 km) west of Ouessant (48°40′N 6°45′W) by SM UC-66 (Imperial German Navy).
Pierre Hubert	Italy	World War I: The sailing vessel was sunk in the Mediterranean Sea 15 nautical miles (28 km) north of Ibiza, Spain by SM U-35 (Imperial German Navy). Her crew survived.
Romsdalen	United Kingdom	World War I: The collier was torpedoed and sunk in the English Channel 10 nautical miles (19 km) south west of Portland Bill, Dorset (50°22′N 2°35′W) by SM U-84 (Imperial German Navy). Her crew survived.
Sea Products Co. No. 2	United States	The barge went ashore in a gale on the coast of California, a total loss.
Sea Products Co. No. 4	United States	The barge went ashore in a gale on the coast of California, a total loss.
Silene	France	World War I: The schooner was scuttled in the Atlantic Ocean 50 nautical miles (93 km) north of Ouessant by SM UC-21 (Imperial German Navy).
Tobyhanna	United States	The schooner barge foundered off Delaware in a gale, a total loss. The crew were rescued by Annetta (flag unknown) before sinking.
Trompenburg	Netherlands	World War I: The cargo ship was sunk in the Atlantic Ocean 65 nautical miles (120 km) west of Ouessant (48°40′N 6°45′W) by SM UC-66 (Imperial German Navy).
SM U-83	Imperial German Navy	World War I: The Type U 81 submarine was attacked and sunk in the Atlantic Ocean south west of Ireland by the Q-ship HMS Farnborough (Royal Navy). Thirty-five of her 37 crew were killed.
Worcestershire	United Kingdom	World War I: The cargo ship struck a mine and sank in the Indian Ocean 10 nautical miles (19 km) south west of Colombo, Ceylon with the loss of two of her crew.

== 18 February ==
List of shipwrecks: 18 February 1917
Ship	State	Description
Berrima	United Kingdom	World War I: The passenger ship either struck a mine placed by SM U-84 (Imperial German Navy) or was torpedoed and damaged in the English Channel 50 nautical miles (93 km) west of Portland Bill, Dorset with the loss of four lives. Her crew were rescued by the destroyer HMS Forester (Royal Navy). Berrima was towed to Portland where she was repaired and returned to service.
HMT Clifton	Royal Navy	World War I: The naval trawler struck a mine placed by UC 33 (Imperial German Navy) and sank in the Irish Sea off the Daunts Rock Lightship (United Kingdom) with the loss of thirteen of her crew.
Giuseppe	Italy	World War I: The cargo ship was sunk in the Mediterranean Sea 5 nautical miles (9.3 km) south of Tarragona, Spain by SM U-35 (Imperial German Navy). Her crew survived.
Guido T	Italy	World War I: The sailing vessel was scuttled in the Mediterranean Sea 15 nautical miles (28 km) south south east of Tarragona by SM U-35 (Imperial German Navy).
Jean Pierre	France	World War I: The three-masted schooner was scuttled in the Bay of Biscay 95 nautical miles (176 km) west of Pointe de la Coubre, Charente-Maritime (45°48′N 3°05′W) by SM U-50 (Imperial German Navy).
Juno	Norway	World War I: The cargo ship was sunk in the English Channel 15 nautical miles (28 km) south south west of Start Point, Devon, United Kingdom (49°59′N 3°41′W) by SM U-84 (Imperial German Navy). Her crew survived.
Netherton	United Kingdom	World War I: The barquentine was scuttled in the English Channel 16 nautical miles (30 km) south of Anvil Point, Dorset by SM UC-18 (Imperial German Navy). Her crew survived.
Skogland	Sweden	World War I: The cargo ship was sunk in the Mediterranean Sea 6 nautical miles (11 km) south of Tarragona by SM U-35 (Imperial German Navy).
Thorgny	Norway	World War I: The cargo ship was sunk in the English Channel 15 nautical miles (28 km) south west of Start Point, Devon (49°57′N 3°53′W) by SM UC-17 (Imperial German Navy). Her crew survived.
Triumph	United Kingdom	World War I: The ketch was shelled and sunk in the English Channel 45 nautical miles (83 km) north north west of the Roches-Douvres Lighthouse, Côtes-du-Nord, France by SM UC-21 (Imperial German Navy). Her crew survived.
Valdes	United Kingdom	World War I: The cargo ship was torpedoed and sunk in the English Channel 7 nautical miles (13 km) south of Portland Bill by SM U-84 (Imperial German Navy) with the loss of eleven of her crew.

== 19 February ==
List of shipwrecks: 19 February 1917
Ship	State	Description
Alice	France	World War I: The fishing vessel was sunk in the English Channel north west of Fécamp, Seine-Inférieure (49°49′N 0°18′E) by SM UC-65 (Imperial German Navy).
Brigade	United Kingdom	World War I: The coaster was shelled and sunk in the English Channel 12 nautical miles (22 km) north west of Cayeux-sur-Mer, Somme, France (50°17′N 1°10′E) by SM UC-65 (Imperial German Navy). Her crew survived.
Centurion	United Kingdom	World War I: The full-rigged ship was scuttled in the English Channel 15 nautical miles (28 km) south east of The Lizard, Cornwall by SM UC-17 (Imperial German Navy). Her crew survived.
Corso	United Kingdom	World War I: The cargo ship was torpedoed and sunk in the Mediterranean Sea 110 nautical miles (200 km) south by west of Malta (35°09′N 14°28′E) by SM U-64 (Imperial German Navy). Her crew survived, but four survivors were taken as prisoners of war.
Halcyon	United Kingdom	World War I: The trawler struck a mine placed by SM U-71 (Imperial German Navy) and sank in the Atlantic Ocean off the Butt of Lewis, Outer Hebrides with the loss of ten crew.
Headley	United Kingdom	World War I: The cargo ship was torpedoed and sunk in the Atlantic Ocean 35 nautical miles (65 km) south south west of the Bishop Rock, Isles of Scilly by SM U-67 (Imperial German Navy). Her crew survived.
Justine Marie	Belgium	World War I: The fishing vessel was sunk in the English Channel off Dieppe, Seine-Inférieure by SM UC-65 (Imperial German Navy). Her crew survived.
HMS Lady Olive	Royal Navy	World War I: The Q-ship was sunk in the English Channel west of Jersey, Channel Islands, by SM UC-18 (Imperial German Navy). Her crew were rescued by Dunois (French Navy).
HMT Picton Castle	Royal Navy	World War I: The naval trawler struck a mine placed by SM UC-17 (Imperial German Navy) and sank in the English Channel 3 nautical miles (5.6 km) south of Dartmouth, Devon with the loss of twelve of her crew.
Pinmore	United Kingdom	World War I: The sailing vessel was scuttled in the Atlantic Ocean 540 nautical miles (1,000 km) north west of the St Paul Rocks, Brazil by SMS Seeadler (Imperial German Navy).
Quinto	Italy	World War I: The cargo ship was sunk in the Tyrrhenian Sea south of Rome by SM UC-38 (Imperial German Navy). Her crew survived.
Rutenfjell	Norway	World War I: The cargo ship struck a mine placed by SM UC-21 (Imperial German Navy) and sank in the Bay of Biscay 5 nautical miles (9.3 km) north east of Kerdonis, Belle Île, Morbihan, France (47°20′N 3°01′W) with the loss of a crew member.
Saint Louis de Gonzague	France	World War I: The fishing vessel was sunk in the English Channel 10 nautical miles (19 km) west of Étaples, Pas-de-Calais by SM UC-65 (Imperial German Navy).
Sigrid	Russia	World War I: The cargo ship was sunk in the North Sea 30 nautical miles (56 km) north east of Unst, Shetland Islands, United Kingdom (60°50′N 0°10′E) by SM U-49 (Imperial German Navy). Her crew survived.
Skrim	Norway	World War I: The coaster was sunk in the English Channel 20 nautical miles (37 km) north north west of Le Tréport, Seine-Inférieure by SM UC-65 (Imperial German Navy). Her crew survived.
SM UC-18	Imperial German Navy	World War I: The Type UC II submarine was sunk in the English Channel west of Jersey (49°15′N 2°34′W) by the Q ship HMS Lady Olive (Royal Navy) with the loss of all 28 crew.
Violette	France	World War I: The boat was sunk in the English Channel 10 nautical miles (19 km) west of Étaples by SM UC-65 (Imperial German Navy).

== 20 February ==
List of shipwrecks: 20 February 1917
Ship	State	Description
Cacique	France	World War I: The cargo ship was sunk in the Atlantic Ocean 250 nautical miles (460 km) west of the Île d'Yeu, Vendée (46°41′N 8°21′W) by SM U-21 (Imperial German Navy) with the loss of 21 crew.
Doravore	Norway	World War I: The cargo ship was sunk in the Tyrrhenian Sea south of Elba, Italy (42°11′N 11°22′E) by SM UC-38 (Imperial German Navy). Her crew survived.
Falls of Afton	Norway	World War I: The barque was scuttled in the Atlantic Ocean 8 nautical miles (15 km) south west of the Wolf Rock, Cornwall, United Kingdom (49°50′N 5°55′W) by SM UC-17 (Imperial German Navy). Her crew survived, one of them was taken aboard SM UC-17 at his request.
Rosalie	United Kingdom	World War I: The cargo ship was torpedoed and sunk in the Mediterranean Sea 8 nautical miles (15 km) east of Djidjelli, Algeria (37°01′N 5°54′E) by SM U-39 (Imperial German Navy) with the loss of 21 crew.
Sankaty	United States	The ferry went ashore on Wilburs Point at Sconticut Neck near New Bedford, Massachusetts. Refloated, repaired and returned to service.

== 21 February ==
List of shipwrecks: 21 February 1917
Ship	State	Description
Alice	Norway	World War I: The coaster was sunk in the English Channel 2 nautical miles (3.7 km) north of Cap d'Antifer, Seine-Inférieure, France (49°49′N 0°18′E) by SM UB-40 (Imperial German Navy). Her crew survived.
Dukat	Norway	World War I: The cargo ship was sunk in the Atlantic Ocean 7 nautical miles (13 km) south south east of Ballycotton, County Cork, United Kingdom by SM U-84 (Imperial German Navy). Her crew survived.
Energy	United Kingdom	World War I: The fishing smack was shelled and sunk in the Atlantic Ocean 11 nautical miles (20 km) south south east of the Eddystone Lighthouse (49°57′N 4°40′W) by SM UC-66 (Imperial German Navy). Her crew survived.
K.L.M.	United Kingdom	World War I: The fishing smack was shelled and sunk in the Atlantic Ocean 8 nautical miles (15 km) north west by west of the Eddystone Lighthouse by SM UC-66 (Imperial German Navy). Her crew survived.
Manningham	Sweden	World War I: The cargo ship was sunk in the English Channel 25 nautical miles (46 km) north of Ouessant, Finistère, France by SM UC-17 (Imperial German Navy). Her crew survived.
HMS Mendi	Royal Navy	The troopship was rammed and sunk in the English Channel off St Catherine's Point, Isle of Wight by Darro (United Kingdom). A total of 646 passengers and crew were killed. Survivors were rescued by HMS Brisk (Royal Navy).
Monarch	United Kingdom	World War I: The fishing smack was sunk in the Atlantic Ocean 14 nautical miles (26 km) south east by south of the Eddystone Lighthouse by SM UC-66 (Imperial German Navy). Her crew survived.
Perseus	United Kingdom	World War I: The cargo ship struck a mine and sank in the Indian Ocean 11 nautical miles (20 km) west of Colombo, Ceylon with the loss of three of her crew.
HMS Princess Alberta	Royal Navy	World War I: The fleet messenger struck a mine placed by SM UC-23 (Imperial German Navy) and sank in Mudros Bay (39°47′N 25°06′E) with the loss of 33 lives
Tecwyn	United Kingdom	World War I: The auxiliary schooner was shelled and sunk in the English Channel 20 nautical miles (37 km) south of Portland Bill, Dorset by SM U-60 (Imperial German Navy). Her crew survived.
Wathfield	United Kingdom	World War I: The cargo ship was torpedoed and sunk in the Mediterranean Sea 15 nautical miles (28 km) north of Cape Carbon, Algeria (37°00′N 4°56′E) by SM U-39 (Imperial German Navy) with the loss of eighteen crew.

== 22 February ==
List of shipwrecks: 22 February 1917
Ship	State	Description
Adelina	Italy	World War I: The barque was shelled and sunk in the Mediterranean Sea east of Solenzara, Corsica, France (41°46′N 9°37′E) by SM UC-38 (Imperial German Navy). Her crew survived.
Ajax	Norway	World War I: The cargo ship was sunk in the English Channel 30 nautical miles (56 km) north of Ouessant, Finistère, France by SM UC-17 (Imperial German Navy). Her crew survived.
Ape	Italy	World War I: The sailing vessel was shelled and sunk in the Mediterranean Sea east of Solenzara (41°50′N 9°37′E) by SM UC-38 (Imperial German Navy).
Bandoeng	Netherlands	World War I: The cargo ship was sunk in the Atlantic Ocean 30 nautical miles (56 km) north west of the Bishop Rock, Isles of Scilly, United Kingdom by SM U-21 (Imperial German Navy).
Blenheim	Norway	World War I: The barque was sunk in the Atlantic Ocean 30 nautical miles (56 km) south south west of the Fastnet Rock by SM U-50 (Imperial German Navy). Her crew survived.
Catherine Horan	United States	The barge ran aground near Hog Island, Massachusetts. Refloated and returned to service.
Eemland	Netherlands	World War I: The cargo ship was scuttled in the Atlantic Ocean 30 nautical miles (56 km) north west of the Bishop's Rock (49°41′N 7°35′W) by SM U-21 (Imperial German Navy).
Frolic	United Kingdom	World War I: The trawler was shelled and sunk in the North Sea 90 nautical miles (170 km) east by south of Aberdeen by SM UC-42 (Imperial German Navy). Her crew survived.
Gaasterland	Netherlands	World War I: The cargo ship was scuttled in the Atlantic Ocean 30 nautical miles (56 km) north west of the Bishop's Rock (50°10′N 7°05′W) by SM U-21 (Imperial German Navy). Her crew survived.
Giovanni P.	Italy	World War I: The sailing vessel was shelled and sunk in the Mediterranean Sea east of Solenzara by SM UC-38 (Imperial German Navy).
Invercauld	United Kingdom	World War I: The barque was torpedoed and sunk in the Atlantic Ocean 22 nautical miles (41 km) south east of Mine Head, County Cork by SM U-84 (Imperial German Navy). Her crew survived.
Jacatra	Netherlands	World War I: The cargo ship was captured, torpedoed and sunk in the Atlantic Ocean 30 nautical miles (56 km) west of the Bishop's Rock (49°52′N 7°00′W) by SM U-21 (Imperial German Navy).
John Miles	United Kingdom	The coaster was torpedoed and sunk in the North Sea 11 nautical miles (20 km) south east of Hartlepool, County Durham (54°38′10″N 0°54′00″W) by SM UB-21 (Imperial German Navy) with the loss of ten crew.
Lord Collingwood	United Kingdom	World War I: The trawler was sunk in the North Sea 85 nautical miles (157 km) east by south of Aberdeen by SM UC-42 (Imperial German Navy). Her crew survived.
Mary Horan	United States	The barge ran aground near Hog Island, Massachusetts.
Michielino	Italy	World War I: The sailing vessel struck a mine placed by SM UC-38 (Imperial German Navy) and sank in the Tyrrhenian Sea.
Noorderdijk	Netherlands	World War I: The cargo ship was captured, torpedoed and sunk in the Atlantic Ocean 30 nautical miles (56 km) north west of the Bishop's Rock by SM U-21 (Imperial German Navy).
Normanna	Norway	World War I: The cargo ship was scuttled in the English Channel by SM U-21 (Imperial German Navy). Her crew survived.
Nostra Signora del Porto Salvo	United Kingdom	World War I: The brigantine was scuttled in the Mediterranean Sea 35 nautical miles (65 km) west of Marettimo, Italy by SM UC-35 (Imperial German Navy). Her crew survived.
Saint Sauveur	France	World War I: The schooner was sunk in the English Channel 30 nautical miles (56 km) north of Ouessant by SM UC-17 (Imperial German Navy). Her crew survived.
San Michele	Italy	World War I: The barque was shelled and sunk in the Mediterranean Sea east of Solenzara (41°40′N 9°40′E) by SM UC-38 (Imperial German Navy).
Ville de Bougie	France	World War I: The coaster was sunk in the Mediterranean Sea off the coast of Algeria (36°55′N 4°40′E) by SM U-39 (Imperial German Navy). Her crew survived.
Vincenzino	Italy	World War I: The sailing vessel struck a mine placed by SM UC-38 (Imperial German Navy) and sank in the Tyrrhenian Sea.
Willis Ct. Townes	United States	The barge ran aground near Hog Island, Massachusetts. Refloated and returned to service.
Zaandijk	Netherlands	World War I: The cargo ship was scuttled in the Atlantic Ocean 30 nautical miles (56 km) north west of the Bishop's Rock (49°52′N 7°00′W) by SM U-21 (Imperial German Navy).

== 23 February ==
List of shipwrecks: 23 February 1917
Ship	State	Description
Belgier	United Kingdom	World War I: The cargo ship was shelled and sunk in the Bay of Biscay 30 nautical miles (56 km) west of Belle Île, Morbihan, France (47°32′N 3°58′W) by SM UC-17 (Imperial German Navy). Her crew survived.
Capitol City	United States	The barge sprung a leak and sank one-eighth-mile (0.20 km) south south west of the Brenton Reef Lightship in Block Island Sound, a total loss. Both crewmen died.
Grenadier	United Kingdom	World War I: The cargo ship struck a mine placed by SM UC-4 (Imperial German Navy) and sank in the North Sea 6 nautical miles (11 km) east north east of the Shipwash Lightship (United Kingdom) (52°06′N 1°42′E) with the loss of eight of her crew.
Iser	United Kingdom	World War I: The collier was torpedoed and sunk in the Bay of Biscay 14 nautical miles (26 km) north west of Belle Île (47°28′N 3°35′W) by SM UC-17 (Imperial German Navy) with the loss of a crew member.
Katherine	United Kingdom	World War I: The sailing vessel was sunk in the Atlantic Ocean 200 nautical miles (370 km) north east of the St Paul Rocks, Brazil by SMS Möwe (Imperial German Navy); Her crew were taken as prisoners of war.
Longhirst	United Kingdom	World War I: The cargo ship was torpedoed and sunk in the Mediterranean Sea 20 nautical miles (37 km) east of Cape Bon, Tunisia (37°08′N 11°25′E) by SM U-35 (Imperial German Navy) with the loss of two crew.
Nyland	Norway	World War I: The cargo ship was sunk in the Bay of Biscay 12 to 13 nautical miles (22 to 24 km) off Groix, Morbihan (47°31′N 3°42′W) by SM UC-17 (Imperial German Navy). Her crew survived.
Trojan Prince	United Kingdom	World War I: The cargo ship was torpedoed and sunk in the Mediterranean Sea 5 nautical miles (9.3 km) north of Cape Churchell, Algeria by SM U-39 (Imperial German Navy) with the loss of two crew.
SM UC-32	Imperial German Navy	World War I: The Type UC II submarine was sunk by a mine she was laying off the Roker Pier Lighthouse, County Durham, United Kingdom (54°54′31″N 1°19′19″W) with the loss of all nineteen of her 22 crew.

== 24 February ==
List of shipwrecks: 24 February 1917
Ship	State	Description
Albina	Italy	World War I: The sailing vessel was sunk in the Mediterranean Sea east of Siniscola, Sardinia (40°39′N 9°58′E) by SM UC-38 (Imperial German Navy).
Beneficent	United Kingdom	World War I: The cargo ship was sunk in the North Sea 5 nautical miles (9.3 km) east north east of Hartlepool, County Durham (54°44′N 1°04′W) by SM UC-30 (Imperial German Navy) with the loss of three of her crew.
Dorothy	United Kingdom	World War I: The cargo ship was torpedoed and sunk in the Mediterranean Sea 25 nautical miles (46 km) south east by south of Pantelleria, Italy (ERROR - not: (42°39′N 4°08′E) by SM U-35 (Imperial German Navy) with the loss of six crew.
Falcon	United Kingdom	World War I: The cargo ship was sunk in the Atlantic Ocean 150 nautical miles (280 km) west north west of the Fastnet Rock (52°40′N 14°45′W) by SM U-50 (Imperial German Navy). Her crew survived.
Miaoulis	Greece	World War I: The cargo ship was sunk in the Mediterranean Sea 130 nautical miles (240 km) off Benghazi, Libya by SM UB-43 (Imperial German Navy). Her crew survived.
Prikonisos	Greece	World War I: The cargo ship was shelled and sunk in the Mediterranean Sea 30 nautical miles (56 km) south east of Pantelleria (36°30′N 12°50′E) by SM U-35 (Imperial German Navy) with the loss of four crew.
Salamis	Greece	World War I: the coaster was scuttled in the Bay of Biscay 10 nautical miles (19 km) south by east of the Glénan Islands, Finistère, France (47°33′N 3°54′W) by SM UC-17 (Imperial German Navy).
Venere	Italy	World War I: The schooner was shelled and sunk in the Mediterranean Sea 2 nautical miles (3.7 km) south of San Pietro Island by SM U-65 (Imperial German Navy).
HMY Verona	Royal Navy	World War I: The naval yacht struck a mine placed by SM UC-33 (Imperial German Navy) and sank in the North Sea off Portmahomack, Ross-shire (57°52′N 3°39′W) with the loss of 23 of her crew.

== 25 February ==
List of shipwrecks: 25 February 1917
Ship	State	Description
Aries	United Kingdom	World War I: The cargo ship was shelled and sunk in the Atlantic Ocean 190 nautical miles (350 km) north west by west of the Fastnet Rock by SM U-50 (Imperial German Navy). Her crew survived, but her captain was taken as a prisoner of war.
Huntsman	United Kingdom	World War I: The cargo ship was torpedoed and sunk in the Atlantic Ocean 180 nautical miles (330 km) north west by west of the Fastnet Rock (52°04′N 12°02′W) by SM U-50 (Imperial German Navy) with the loss of two crew.
Kleber	France	World War I: The sailing vessel was sunk in the Atlantic Ocean off Ouessant, Finistère by SM UC-17 (Imperial German Navy).
Laconia	United Kingdom	World War I: The troopship was torpedoed and sunk in the Atlantic Ocean 160 nautical miles (300 km) north west by west of the Fastnet Rock (52°00′N 13°40′W) by SM U-50 (Imperial German Navy) with the loss of twelve lives.
Maria Adriana	Netherlands	World War I: The sailing vessel was scuttled in the English Channel off Cap Barfleur, Seine-Inférieure, France by SM UB-40 (Imperial German Navy).
Saint Joseph	France	World War I: The fishing vessel was scuttled in the English Channel 6 nautical miles (11 km) west of Berck, Pas-de-Calais by SM UC-65 (Imperial German Navy). Her crew survived.
Vigda	Norway	World War I: The cargo ship was sunk in the English Channel 5 nautical miles (9.3 km) south of the Owers Lightship (United Kingdom) by SM UC-65 (Imperial German Navy). Her crew survived.

== 26 February ==
List of shipwrecks: 26 February 1917
Ship	State	Description
Afreida Woermann	Germany	The cargo ship foundered in the Kattegat north of Höganäs, Skåne County, Sweden.
Alberdina	Netherlands	World War I: The sailing vessel was scuttled in the English Channel 35 nautical miles (65 km) north east of Alderney, Channel Islands by SM UC-65 (Imperial German Navy). Her crew survived.
Algiers	United Kingdom	World War I: The cargo ship struck a mine and sank in the English Channel 3 nautical miles (5.6 km) south of the Owers Lightship (50°35′N 0°40′W) by SM UC-65 (Imperial German Navy) with the loss of eight of her crew.
British Yeoman	United Kingdom	World War I: The sailing vessel was sunk in the Atlantic Ocean 230 nautical miles (430 km) north north west of the St Paul Rocks, Brazil by SMS Seeadler (Imperial German Navy).
Burnby	United Kingdom	World War I: The collier was torpedoed and sunk in the Mediterranean Sea 20 nautical miles (37 km) north of Cape Falcon, Algeria (36°00′N 0°42′W) by SM U-39 (Imperial German Navy). Her crew survived, but her captain was taken as a prisoner of war.
Clan Farquhar	United Kingdom	World War I: The cargo ship was torpedoed and sunk in the Mediterranean Sea 80 nautical miles (150 km) east of Benghazi, Libya (33°30′N 20°05′E) by SM UB-43 (Imperial German Navy) with the loss of 49 of her crew. One survivor was taken as a prisoner of war.
Dido	United Kingdom	World War I: The cargo ship struck a mine placed by SM UC-7 (Imperial German Navy) and sank in the North Sea 4 nautical miles (7.4 km) north north east of the Spurn Lightship (United Kingdom) (53°07′N 0°15′E) with the loss of 28 of her crew.
Dogan	Ottoman Navy	The auxiliary river gunboat was lost on this date.
Hannah Crossdell	United Kingdom	World War I: The schooner struck a mine placed by SM UC-65 (Imperial German Navy) and sank in the Irish Sea 1 nautical mile (1.9 km) south of Skokholm, Pembrokeshire with the loss of four of her crew.
Lamentin	France	World War I: The barque was shelled and sunk in the English Channel 30 nautical miles (56 km) west south west of Guernsey, Channel Islands (49°40′N 3°25′W) by SM UC-17 (Imperial German Navy). Her crew survived.
Sea Gull	United Kingdom	World War I: The coaster struck a mine placed by SM UC-16 (Imperial German Navy) and sank in the English Channel 4 nautical miles (7.4 km) off Folkestone, Kent with the loss of two of her crew.
HMT St Germain	Royal Navy	World War I: The naval trawler struck a mine placed by SM UC-16 (Imperial German Navy) and was damaged in the English Channel off Folkestone (51°01′40″N 1°14′40″E). One man died. She was beached by was later refloated, repaired and returned to service.
Tammerfos	Russia	World War I: The coaster was torpedoed and sunk in the English Channel off Barfleur, Seine-Inférieure, France by SM UB-40 (Imperial German Navy). Her crew survived.
Victoria	Greece	World War I: The cargo ship was sunk in the Mediterranean Sea off Algiers, Algeria by SM UC-37 (Imperial German Navy). Her crew survived.

== 27 February ==
List of shipwrecks: 27 February 1917
Ship	State	Description
Brodmore	United Kingdom	World War I: The cargo ship was torpedoed and sunk in the Mediterranean Sea (33°50′N 21°02′E) by SM UB-43 (Imperial German Navy). Her crew survived, but one of them was taken as a prisoner of war.
Brunette	France	World War I: The sailing vessel was sunk in the English Channel off The Needles, Isle of Wight, United Kingdom by SM UC-65 (Imperial German Navy).
Elena M.	Italy	World War I: The sailing vessel was sunk in the Mediterranean Sea north west of Palermo, Sicily by SM UC-38 (Imperial German Navy).
HMT Evadne	Royal Navy	World War I: The naval trawler struck a mine placed by SM UC-65 (Imperial German Navy) and sank in the English Channel 8 nautical miles (15 km) south of the Owers Lightship (United Kingdom) (50°33′N 0°39′W) with the loss of twelve of her crew.
Galgorm Castle	United Kingdom	World War I: The barque was shelled and sunk in the Atlantic Ocean 90 nautical miles (170 km) west of the Fastnet Rock by SM U-49 (Imperial German Navy) with the loss of eleven crew.
Kio Ora	United Kingdom	The steamer stranded off Castle Island, British West Indies. Later refloated by the wrecking steamer Relief (flag unknown).
La Rochefoucauld	France	World War I: The barque was captured and sunk by SMS Seeadler (Imperial German Navy) north west of St Paul Rocks, in the South Atlantic.
Luigino B.	Italy	World War I: The cargo ship was sunk in the Atlantic Ocean north west of Tearaght Island, County Kerry, United Kingdom by SM U-49 (Imperial German Navy). Her crew survived.
Marie Madeleine	France	World War I: The sailing vessel was shelled and sunk in the English Channel 10 nautical miles (19 km) north of Ver-sur-Mer, Calvados (49°30′N 0°40′W) by SM UC-43 (Imperial German Navy).
Mecklenburg	Netherlands	World War I: The passenger ship struck a mine placed by SM UC-7 (Imperial German Navy) and sank in the North Sea off the Galloper Lightship (United Kingdom).
Niederwald	Imperial German Navy	World War I: Badly damaged by a mine off Terschelling in the West Frisian Islands off the coast of the Netherlands on 23 February and abandoned, the minesweeper foundered in the North Sea during a storm.
S. Ciro Palmerino	Italy	World War I: The sailing vessel was sunk in the Mediterranean Sea north west of Palermo by SM UC-38 (Imperial German Navy).
Tritonia	United Kingdom	World War I: The cargo ship was torpedoed and sunk in the Atlantic Ocean north west of Tearaght Island (52°13′N 11°26′W) by SM U-49 (Imperial German Navy) with the loss of two crew.

== 28 February ==
List of shipwrecks: 28 February 1917
Ship	State	Description
Cassini	French Navy	World War I: The converted minelayer struck a mine placed by SM UC-35 (Imperial German Navy) and sank in the Strait of Bonifacio with the loss of 88 of her crew.
Elisabetta Concettina	Italy	World War I: The sailing vessel was sunk in the Mediterranean Sea 35 nautical miles (65 km) north of Linosa by SM UC-35 (Imperial German Navy).
Emancipato	Italy	World War I: The sailing vessel was sunk in the Mediterranean Sea east of Corsica, France by SM U-65 (Imperial German Navy).
Giustina Madre	Italy	World War I: The sailing vessel was sunk in the Mediterranean Sea 35 nautical miles (65 km) north of Linosa by SM UC-35 (Imperial German Navy).
Harriet Williams	UKGBI	World War I: The schooner was scuttled in the English Channel 15 nautical miles (28 km) north north east of Cap d'Antifer, Manche, France by SM UB-18 (Imperial German Navy). Her crew survived.
Immaculée Conception	France	World War I: The sailing vessel was sunk in the English Channel 15 nautical miles (28 km) south south west of Dungeness, Kent, United Kingdom by SM UB-40 (Imperial German Navy). Her crew survived.
Marie Joseph	France	World War I: The schooner was scuttled in the English Channel 1 nautical mile (1.9 km) off Étretat, Seine-Inférieure (49°44′N 0°11′E) by SM UC-65 (Imperial German Navy). Her crew survived.
Shinsei Maru	Japan	World War I: The cargo ship was sunk in the Mediterranean Sea 80 nautical miles (150 km) north of Benghazi, Libya by SM UB-43 (Imperial German Navy).
Sjøstad	Norway	World War I: The cargo ship was sunk in the English Channel 10 nautical miles (19 km) north west of Cap la Heve, Seine-Inférieure by SM UC-65 (Imperial German Navy) with the loss of nine of her crew.

== Unknown date ==
List of shipwrecks: unknown February 1917
Ship	State	Description
Fanny	United Kingdom	The 126.3-foot (38.5 m), 235-ton steam trawler went missing after being sighted fishing on 1 February west of Scotland with the loss of all ten of her crew.
Usona	United Kingdom	The steamer was sunk by a submarine sometime after 2 February.
