= SM U-85 =

Military submarine

History

German Empire
- Name: U-85
- Ordered: 23 June 1915
- Builder: Germaniawerft, Kiel
- Yard number: 255
- Laid down: 29 November 1915
- Launched: 22 August 1916
- Commissioned: 23 October 1916
- Fate: Foundered in North Sea after 7 March 1917, 38 dead (all hands lost).

General characteristics
- Displacement: 808 t (795 long tons) surfaced; 946 t (931 long tons) submerged
- Length: 70.06 m (229 ft 10 in) (o/a); 55.55 m (182 ft 3 in) (pressure hull)
- Beam: 6.30 m (20 ft 8 in) (oa); 4.15 m (13 ft 7 in) (pressure hull)
- Height: 8.00 m (26 ft 3 in)
- Draught: 4.02 m (13 ft 2 in)
- Installed power: 2 × 2,400 PS (1,765 kW; 2,367 shp) surfaced; 2 × 1,200 PS (883 kW; 1,184 shp) submerged
- Propulsion: 2 shafts, 2 × 1.70 m (5 ft 7 in) propellers
- Speed: 16.8 knots (31.1 km/h; 19.3 mph) surfaced; 9.1 knots (16.9 km/h; 10.5 mph) submerged
- Range: 11,220 nmi (20,780 km; 12,910 mi) at 8 knots (15 km/h; 9.2 mph) surfaced; 56 nmi (104 km; 64 mi) at 5 knots (9.3 km/h; 5.8 mph) submerged
- Test depth: 50 m (160 ft)
- Complement: 4 officers, 31 enlisted
- Armament: 4 × 50 cm (19.7 in) torpedo tubes (two bow, two stern); 12-16 torpedoes; 1 × 10.5 cm (4.1 in) SK L/45 deck gun (from 1917)

Service record
- Part of: IV Flotilla; 15 January – 12 March 1917
- Commanders: Kptlt. Willy Petz; 23 October 1916 – 12 March 1917
- Operations: 3 patrols
- Victories: 4 merchant ships sunk (20,225 GRT); 1 merchant ship damaged (7,608 GRT)

SM U-85 (Note: "SM" stands for "Seiner Majestät" (English: His Majesty's) and combined with the U for Unterseeboot would be translated as His Majesty's Submarine.) was one of the 329 submarines serving in the Imperial German Navy in World War I. U-85 was engaged in the naval warfare and took part in the First Battle of the Atlantic.

Initially, U-81 to U-83 had one 10.5 cm gun with 140-240 rounds. U-84 - U-86 on the other hand had two 8.8 cm guns. In 1917, U-84 - U-86 were refitted with a single 10.5 cm gun (240 rounds)

== Design ==
Type U 81 submarines were preceded by the shorter Type UE I submarines. U-85 had a displacement of 808 tonnes (795 long tons) when at the surface and 946 tonnes (931 long tons) while submerged. She had a total length of 70.06 m (229 ft 10 in), a pressure hull length of 55.55 m (182 ft 3 in), a beam of 6.30 m (20 ft 8 in), a height of 8 m (26 ft 3 in), and a draught of 4.02 m (13 ft 2 in). The submarine was powered by two 2,400 metric horsepower (1,800 kW; 2,400 shp) engines for use while surfaced, and two 1,200 metric horsepower (880 kW; 1,200 shp) engines for use while submerged. She had two propeller shafts. She was capable of operating at depths of up to 50 metres (160 ft).

The submarine had a maximum surface speed of 16.8 knots (31.1 km/h; 19.3 mph) and a maximum submerged speed of 9.1 knots (16.9 km/h; 10.5 mph). When submerged, she could operate for 56 nautical miles (104 km; 64 mi) at 5 knots (9.3 km/h; 5.8 mph); when surfaced, she could travel 11,220 nautical miles (20,780 km; 12,910 mi) at 8 knots (15 km/h; 9.2 mph). U-85 was fitted with four 50 centimetres (20 in) torpedo tubes (two at the bow and two at the stern), twelve to sixteen torpedoes, and one 10.5 cm (4.1 in) SK L/45 deck gun (from 1917). She had a complement of thirty-five (thirty-one crew members and four officers).

== Summary of raiding history ==
Date	Name	Nationality	Tonnage (Note: Tonnages are in gross register tons)	Fate
26 January 1917	Dicax	Norway	923	Sunk
6 February 1917	Cliftonian	United Kingdom	4,303	Sunk
6 February 1917	Explorer	United Kingdom	7,608	Damaged
7 February 1917	California	United Kingdom	8,669	Sunk
7 February 1917	Vedamore	United Kingdom	6,330	Sunk

== Bibliography ==
- Gröner, Erich; Jung, Dieter; Maass, Martin (1991). U-boats and Mine Warfare Vessels. German Warships 1815–1945. Vol. 2. Translated by Thomas, Keith; Magowan, Rachel. London: Conway Maritime Press. ISBN 0-85177-593-4.
