= SM U-54 =

Imperial German Navy submarine

History

German Empire
- Name: U-54
- Ordered: 23 August 1914
- Builder: Germaniawerft, Kiel
- Yard number: 236
- Laid down: 18 March 1915
- Launched: 22 February 1916
- Commissioned: 25 May 1916
- Fate: 24 November 1918 - Surrendered to Italy. Broken up at Taranto in May 1919.

General characteristics
- Class & type: Type U 51 submarine
- Displacement: 715 t (704 long tons) surfaced; 902 t (888 long tons) submerged
- Length: 65.20 m (213 ft 11 in) (o/a); 52.51 m (172 ft 3 in) (pressure hull)
- Beam: 6.44 m (21 ft 2 in) (oa); 4.18 m (13 ft 9 in) (pressure hull)
- Height: 7.82 m (25 ft 8 in)
- Draught: 3.64 m (11 ft 11 in)
- Installed power: 2 × 2,400 PS (1,765 kW; 2,367 shp) surfaced; 2 × 1,200 PS (883 kW; 1,184 shp) submerged
- Propulsion: 2 shafts
- Speed: 17.1 knots (31.7 km/h; 19.7 mph) surfaced; 9.1 knots (16.9 km/h; 10.5 mph) submerged
- Range: 9,400 nmi (17,400 km; 10,800 mi) at 8 knots (15 km/h; 9.2 mph) surfaced; 55 nmi (102 km; 63 mi) at 5 knots (9.3 km/h; 5.8 mph) submerged
- Test depth: 50 m (164 ft 1 in)
- Complement: 36
- Armament: 4 × 50 cm (19.7 in) torpedo tubes (two bow, two stern); 7 torpedoes; 2 × 8.8 cm (3.5 in) SK L/30 deck guns

Service record
- Part of: II Flotilla; 2 July 1916 – 11 November 1918
- Commanders: Kptlt. Freiherr Volkhard von Bothmer; 16 May 1916 – 19 May 1917; Kptlt. Kurt Heeseler; 20 May 1917 – 22 March 1918; Oblt.z.S. Hellmuth von Ruckteschell; 23 March – 11 November 1918
- Operations: 12 patrols
- Victories: 26 merchant ships sunk (66,713 GRT); 1 warship sunk (1,290 tons); 3 merchant ships damaged (15,362 GRT); 1 auxiliary warship damaged (2,485 GRT)

SM U-54 was one of the 329 submarines serving in the Imperial German Navy in World War I. U-54 was engaged in the naval warfare and took part in the First Battle of the Atlantic.

== Summary of raiding history ==
Date	Name	Nationality	Tonnage (Note: Merchant ship tonnages are in gross register tons. Military vessels are listed by tons displacement.)	Fate
3 February 1917	Tamara	Norway	453	Sunk
4 February 1917	Floridian	United Kingdom	4,777	Sunk
4 February 1917	Palmleaf	United Kingdom	5,489	Sunk
5 February 1917	Ainsdale	United Kingdom	1,825	Damaged
5 February 1917	Azul	United Kingdom	3,074	Sunk
7 February 1917	Wallace	United Kingdom	3,930	Damaged
7 February 1917	Saxonian	United Kingdom	4,855	Sunk
15 March 1917	Eugene Pergeline	France	2,203	Sunk
1 April 1917	Consul Persson	Norway	1,835	Sunk
1 April 1917	Fjelland	Norway	387	Sunk
2 April 1917	Havlyst	Norway	532	Sunk
3 June 1917	San Lorenzo	United Kingdom	9,607	Damaged
7 June 1917	Jonathan Holt	United Kingdom	1,523	Sunk
13 June 1917	Darius	United Kingdom	3,426	Sunk
23 July 1917	Ashleigh	United Kingdom	6,985	Sunk
23 July 1917	Huelva	United Kingdom	4,867	Sunk
25 July 1917	Rustington	United Kingdom	3,071	Sunk
26 July 1917	Somerset	United Kingdom	7,163	Sunk
31 July 1917	Alcides	Norway	2,704	Sunk
16 September 1917	Arabis	United Kingdom	3,928	Sunk
17 September 1917	Niemen	France	1,888	Sunk
19 September 1917	Marthe Marguerite	France	588	Sunk
24 September 1917	Louis Bossert	Norway	605	Sunk
25 September 1917	Marceau	France	292	Sunk
30 April 1918	HMS Starmount	Royal Navy	2,485	Damaged
8 May 1918	Dux	United Kingdom	1,349	Sunk
8 May 1918	Princess Dagmar	United Kingdom	913	Sunk
10 May 1918	Wileysike	United Kingdom	2,501	Sunk
16 July 1918	HMS Anchusa	Royal Navy	1,290	Sunk
27 September 1918	En Avant	France	86	Sunk
29 September 1918	Libourne	United Kingdom	1,219	Sunk

== Bibliography ==
- Gröner, Erich; Jung, Dieter; Maass, Martin (1991). U-boats and Mine Warfare Vessels. German Warships 1815–1945. Vol. 2. Translated by Thomas, Keith; Magowan, Rachel. London: Conway Maritime Press. ISBN 0-85177-593-4.
