= SM UC-24 =

World War I German submarine

History

German Empire
- Name: UC-24
- Ordered: 29 August 1915
- Builder: Blohm & Voss, Hamburg
- Yard number: 274
- Launched: 4 March 1916
- Commissioned: 15 August 1916
- Fate: Sunk on 24 May 1917

General characteristics
- Class & type: Type UC II submarine
- Displacement: 417 t (410 long tons), surfaced; 493 t (485 long tons), submerged
- Length: 49.35 m (161 ft 11 in) o/a; 39.30 m (128 ft 11 in) pressure hull
- Beam: 5.22 m (17 ft 2 in) o/a; 3.65 m (12 ft) pressure hull
- Draught: 3.68 m (12 ft 1 in)
- Propulsion: 2 × propeller shafts; 2 × 6-cylinder, 4-stroke diesel engines, 500 PS (370 kW; 490 bhp); 2 × electric motors, 460 PS (340 kW; 450 shp)
- Speed: 11.6 knots (21.5 km/h; 13.3 mph), surfaced; 7.0 knots (13.0 km/h; 8.1 mph), submerged
- Range: 9,430 nmi (17,460 km; 10,850 mi) at 7 knots (13 km/h; 8.1 mph) surfaced; 55 nmi (102 km; 63 mi) at 4 knots (7.4 km/h; 4.6 mph) submerged
- Test depth: 50 m (160 ft)
- Complement: 26
- Armament: 6 × 100 cm (39.4 in) mine tubes; 18 × UC 200 mines; 3 × 50 cm (19.7 in) torpedo tubes (2 bow/external; one stern); 7 × torpedoes; 1 × 8.8 cm (3.5 in) Uk L/30 deck gun
- Notes: 35-second diving time

Service record
- Part of: I Flotilla; 13 November 1916 – 21 February 1917; Pola Flotilla; 21 February – 24 May 1917
- Commanders: Kptlt. Kurt Willich; 17 August 1916 – 24 May 1917
- Operations: 4 patrols
- Victories: 4 merchant ships sunk (9,815 GRT)

SM UC-24 (Note: "SM" stands for "Seiner Majestät" (English: His Majesty's) and combined with the U for Unterseeboot would be translated as His Majesty's Submarine.) was a German Type UC II minelaying submarine or U-boat in the German Imperial Navy (German: Kaiserliche Marine) during World War I. The U-boat was ordered on 29 August 1915 and was launched on 4 March 1916. She was commissioned into the German Imperial Navy on 15 August 1916 as SM UC-24. In four patrols UC-24 was credited with sinking 4 ships, either by torpedo or by mines laid. UC-24 was torpedoed and sunk by Circé off Cattaro on 24 May 1917. The wreck was found in late 2019 at a depth of 85m, 2 nautical miles from the mainland (Molunat, Dubrovnik, today's Croatia).

== Design ==
Like all pre-UC-25 Type UC II submarines, UC-24 had a displacement of 417 tonnes (410 long tons) when at the surface and 493 tonnes (485 long tons) while submerged. She had a length overall of 49.35 m (161 ft 11 in), a beam of 5.22 m (17 ft 2 in), and a draught of 3.65 m (12 ft). The submarine was powered by two six-cylinder four-stroke diesel engines each producing 250 metric horsepower (180 kW; 250 shp) (a total of 500 metric horsepower (370 kW; 490 shp)), two electric motors producing 460 metric horsepower (340 kW; 450 shp), and two propeller shafts. She had a dive time of 35 seconds and was capable of operating at a depth of 50 metres (160 ft).

The submarine had a maximum surface speed of 11.6 knots (21.5 km/h; 13.3 mph) and a submerged speed of 7 knots (13 km/h; 8.1 mph). When submerged, she could operate for 55 nautical miles (102 km; 63 mi) at 4 knots (7.4 km/h; 4.6 mph); when surfaced, she could travel 9,430 nautical miles (17,460 km; 10,850 mi) at 7 knots (13 km/h; 8.1 mph). UC-24 was fitted with six 100 centimetres (39 in) mine tubes, eighteen UC 200 mines, three 50 centimetres (20 in) torpedo tubes (one on the stern and two on the bow), seven torpedoes, and one 8.8 cm (3.5 in) Uk L/30 deck gun. Her complement was twenty-six crew members.

== Summary of raiding history ==
Date	Name	Nationality	Tonnage (Note: Tonnages are in gross register tons)	Fate
4 February 1917	Solbakken	Norway	2,616	Sunk
6 February 1917	Ellavore	Norway	2,733	Sunk
6 February 1917	Havgard	Norway	1,279	Sunk
11 July 1917	Siracusa	Kingdom of Italy	3,187	Sunk
