= SM UB-22 =

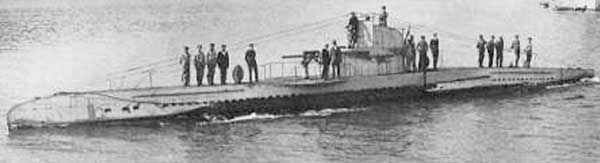
- SM UB-45, a U-boat similar to UB-22

History

German Empire
- Name: UB-22
- Ordered: 30 April 1915
- Builder: Blohm & Voss, Hamburg
- Yard number: 252
- Launched: 9 October 1915
- Completed: 1 March 1916
- Commissioned: 2 March 1916
- Fate: Sunk by mine 19 January 1918

General characteristics
- Class & type: Type UB II submarine
- Displacement: 263 t (259 long tons) surfaced; 292 t (287 long tons) submerged
- Length: 36.13 m (118 ft 6 in) o/a; 27.13 m (89 ft) pressure hull (o/a)
- Beam: 4.36 m (14 ft 4 in) o/a; 3.85 m (13 ft) pressure hull
- Draught: 3.70 m (12 ft 2 in)
- Propulsion: 1 × propeller shaft; 2 × 6-cylinder diesel engine, 284 PS (209 kW; 280 bhp); 2 × electric motor, 280 PS (210 kW; 280 shp)
- Speed: 9.15 knots (16.95 km/h; 10.53 mph) surfaced; 5.81 knots (10.76 km/h; 6.69 mph) submerged
- Range: 6,450 nmi (11,950 km; 7,420 mi) at 5 knots (9.3 km/h; 5.8 mph) surfaced; 45 nmi (83 km; 52 mi) at 4 knots (7.4 km/h; 4.6 mph) submerged
- Test depth: 50 m (160 ft)
- Complement: 2 officers, 21 men
- Armament: 2 × 50 cm (19.7 in) torpedo tubes; 4 × torpedoes (later 6); 1 × 5 cm SK L/40 gun
- Notes: 45-second diving time

Service record
- Part of: I Flotilla; 14 April 1916 – 1 February 1917; II Flotilla; 1 February – 22 September 1917; V Flotilla; 22 September 1917 – 19 January 1918
- Commanders: Oblt.z.S. Bernhard Putzier; 2 March 1916 – 16 April 1917; Oblt.z.S. Karl Wacker; 17 April 1917 – 19 January 1918
- Operations: 18 patrols
- Victories: 27 merchant ships sunk (16,645 GRT)

SM UB-22 (Note: "SM" stands for "Seiner Majestät" (English: His Majesty's) and combined with the U for Unterseeboot would be translated as His Majesty's Submarine.) was a German Type UB II submarine or U-boat in the German Imperial Navy (German: Kaiserliche Marine) during World War I. The U-boat was ordered on 30 April 1915 and launched on 9 October 1915. She was commissioned into the German Imperial Navy on 2 March 1915 as SM UB-22. The submarine sank 27 ships in 18 patrols for a total of 16,645 gross register tons (GRT). UB-22 was mined and sunk in the same incident with the torpedoboat SMS S16 in the North Sea at 54°40′N 6°32′E on 19 January 1918 in a British minefield.

== Design ==
A Type UB II submarine, UB-22 had a displacement of 263 tonnes (259 long tons) when at the surface and 292 tonnes (287 long tons) while submerged. She had a total length of 36.13 m (118 ft 6 in), a beam of 4.36 m (14 ft 4 in), and a draught of 3.70 m (12 ft 2 in). The submarine was powered by two Körting six-cylinder, four-stroke diesel engines each producing a total 280 metric horsepower (280 shp; 210 kW), a Siemens-Schuckert electric motor producing 206 kilowatts (276 shp; 280 PS), and one propeller shaft. She was capable of operating at depths of up to 50 metres (160 ft).

The submarine had a maximum surface speed of 9.15 knots (16.95 km/h; 10.53 mph) and a maximum submerged speed of 5.81 knots (10.76 km/h; 6.69 mph). When submerged, she could operate for 45 nautical miles (83 km; 52 mi) at 4 knots (7.4 km/h; 4.6 mph); when surfaced, she could travel 6,650 nautical miles (12,320 km; 7,650 mi) at 5 knots (9.3 km/h; 5.8 mph). UB-22 was fitted with two 50 centimetres (20 in) torpedo tubes, four torpedoes, and one 5 cm (2.0 in) SK L/40 deck gun. She had a complement of twenty-one crew members and two officers and a 45-second dive time.

== Summary of raiding history ==
Date	Name	Nationality	Tonnage (Note: Tonnages are in gross register tons)	Fate
20 October 1916	Drafn	Norway	774	Sunk
21 October 1916	Antoinette	Sweden	912	Sunk
21 October 1916	Theodor	Norway	234	Sunk
22 October 1916	Caerloch	Norway	659	Sunk
22 October 1916	Gunn	Norway	483	Sunk
27 October 1916	Sif	Denmark	377	Sunk
29 October 1916	Falkefjell	Norway	1,131	Sunk
5 February 1917	Resolute	United Kingdom	125	Sunk
6 February 1917	Adelaide	United Kingdom	133	Sunk
6 February 1917	Romeo	United Kingdom	114	Sunk
6 February 1917	Rupert	United Kingdom	114	Sunk
7 February 1917	Boyne Castle	United Kingdom	245	Sunk
7 February 1917	Shakespeare	United Kingdom	210	Sunk
9 February 1917	Benbow	United Kingdom	172	Sunk
9 February 1917	Duke of York	United Kingdom	150	Sunk
10 February 1917	Athenian	United Kingdom	171	Sunk
10 February 1917	Bellax	Norway	1,107	Sunk
10 February 1917	Ireland	United Kingdom	152	Sunk
28 March 1917	Oakwell	United Kingdom	248	Sunk
29 April 1917	Dilston Castle	United Kingdom	129	Sunk
30 April 1917	Argo	United Kingdom	131	Sunk
16 June 1917	Inge	Denmark	336	Sunk
4 August 1917	Azira	United Kingdom	1,144	Sunk
6 August 1917	Jenny	Denmark	293	Sunk
6 August 1917	Narcissus	United Kingdom	58	Sunk
7 November 1917	Suntrap	United Kingdom	1,353	Sunk
13 December 1917	Garthwaite	United Kingdom	5,690	Sunk

== Bibliography ==
- Bendert, Harald (2000). Die UB-Boote der Kaiserlichen Marine, 1914-1918. Einsätze, Erfolge, Schicksal (in German). Hamburg: Verlag E.S. Mittler & Sohn GmbH. ISBN 3-8132-0713-7.
- Gröner, Erich; Jung, Dieter; Maass, Martin (1991). U-boats and Mine Warfare Vessels. German Warships 1815–1945. Vol. 2. Translated by Thomas, Keith; Magowan, Rachel. London: Conway Maritime Press. ISBN 0-85177-593-4.
- Rössler, Eberhard (1979). Die deutschen U-Boote und ihre Werften: eine Bilddokumentation über den deutschen U-Bootbau; in zwei Bänden (in German). Vol. I. Munich: Bernard & Graefe. ISBN 3-7637-5213-7.
