= SM UC-47 =

1915 German Type UC II minelaying U-boat

Coordinates: 54°3′N 0°23′E

History

German Empire
- Name: UC-47
- Ordered: 20 November 1915
- Builder: AG Weser, Bremen
- Yard number: 257
- Laid down: 1 February 1916
- Launched: 30 August 1916
- Commissioned: 13 October 1916
- Fate: Sunk, 18 November 1917

General characteristics
- Class & type: Type UC II submarine
- Displacement: 420 t (410 long tons), surfaced; 502 t (494 long tons), submerged
- Length: 51.85 m (170 ft 1 in) o/a; 39.70 m (130 ft 3 in) pressure hull
- Beam: 5.22 m (17 ft 2 in) o/a; 3.65 m (12 ft) pressure hull
- Draught: 3.67 m (12 ft 0 in)
- Propulsion: 2 × propeller shafts; 2 × 6-cylinder, 4-stroke diesel engines, 600 PS (440 kW; 590 shp); 2 × electric motors, 460 PS (340 kW; 450 shp)
- Speed: 11.7 knots (21.7 km/h; 13.5 mph), surfaced; 6.7 knots (12.4 km/h; 7.7 mph), submerged
- Range: 7,280 nmi (13,480 km; 8,380 mi) at 7 knots (13 km/h; 8.1 mph) surfaced; 54 nmi (100 km; 62 mi) at 4 knots (7.4 km/h; 4.6 mph) submerged
- Test depth: 50 m (160 ft)
- Complement: 26
- Armament: 6 × 100 cm (39.4 in) mine tubes; 18 × UC 200 mines; 3 × 50 cm (19.7 in) torpedo tubes (2 bow/external; one stern); 7 × torpedoes; 1 × 8.8 cm (3.5 in) Uk L/30 deck gun
- Notes: 30-second diving time

Service record
- Part of: Flandern / Flandern II Flotilla; 23 January – 18 November 1917
- Commanders: Oblt.z.S. / Kptlt. Paul Hundius; 13 October 1916 – 8 October 1917; Oblt.z.S. Günther Wigankow; 9 October – 18 November 1917
- Operations: 13 patrols
- Victories: 55 merchant ships sunk (73,100 GRT); 1 warship sunk (880 tons); 2 auxiliary warships sunk (514 GRT); 7 merchant ships damaged (14,218 GRT); 1 auxiliary warship damaged (224 GRT)

SM UC-47 was a German Type UC II minelaying submarine or U-boat in the German Imperial Navy (German: Kaiserliche Marine) during World War I. The U-boat was ordered on 20 November 1915, laid down on 1 February 1916, and was launched on 30 August 1916. She was commissioned into the German Imperial Navy on 13 October 1916 as SM UC-47. (Note: "SM" stands for "Seiner Majestät" (English: His Majesty's) and combined with the U for Unterseeboot would be translated as His Majesty's Submarine.) In 13 patrols UC-47 was credited with sinking 58 ships, either by torpedo or by mines laid. UC-47 was rammed and depth charged by British patrol boat P-57, under the command of H.C. Birnie, off Flamborough Head on 18 November 1917. UC-47 went down with all hands.

== Design ==
A Type UC II submarine, UC-47 had a displacement of 420 tonnes (410 long tons) when at the surface and 502 tonnes (494 long tons) while submerged. She had a length overall of 51.85 m (170 ft 1 in), a beam of 5.22 m (17 ft 2 in), and a draught of 3.68 m (12 ft 1 in). The submarine was powered by two six-cylinder four-stroke diesel engines each producing 300 metric horsepower (220 kW; 300 shp) (a total of 600 metric horsepower (440 kW; 590 shp)), two electric motors producing 460 metric horsepower (340 kW; 450 shp), and two propeller shafts. She had a dive time of 48 seconds and was capable of operating at a depth of 50 metres (160 ft).

The submarine had a maximum surface speed of 11.7 knots (21.7 km/h; 13.5 mph) and a submerged speed of 6.7 knots (12.4 km/h; 7.7 mph). When submerged, she could operate for 54 nautical miles (100 km; 62 mi) at 4 knots (7.4 km/h; 4.6 mph); when surfaced, she could travel 7,280 nautical miles (13,480 km; 8,380 mi) at 7 knots (13 km/h; 8.1 mph). UC-47 was fitted with six 100 centimetres (39 in) mine tubes, eighteen UC 200 mines, three 50 centimetres (20 in) torpedo tubes (one on the stern and two on the bow), seven torpedoes, and one 8.8 cm (3.5 in) Uk L/30 deck gun. Her complement was twenty-six crew members.

== Summary of raiding history ==
Date	Name	Nationality	Tonnage (Note: Merchant ship tonnages are in gross register tons. Military vessels are listed by tons displacement.)	Fate
31 January 1917	Modiva	Norway	1,276	Sunk
1 February 1917	Portia	Norway	1,127	Sunk
8 February 1917	HMS Ghurka	Royal Navy	880	Sunk
8 February 1917	Lullington	United Kingdom	2,816	Sunk
10 February 1917	Japanese Prince	United Kingdom	4,876	Sunk
12 February 1917	Aghios Spyridon	Greece	1,618	Sunk
12 February 1917	Brissons	United Kingdom	60	Sunk
13 February 1917	Sequoya	United Kingdom	5,263	Damaged
13 February 1917	F. D. Lambert	United Kingdom	2,195	Sunk
13 February 1917	Fleurette	United Kingdom	60	Sunk
11 March 1917	Charles Le Cour	France	2,352	Sunk
11 March 1917	G. A. Savage	United Kingdom	357	Sunk
12 March 1917	C.A.S.	United Kingdom	60	Sunk
12 March 1917	Ena	United Kingdom	56	Sunk
12 March 1917	Gratia	United Kingdom	37	Sunk
12 March 1917	Hyacinth	United Kingdom	56	Sunk
12 March 1917	Inter-nos	United Kingdom	59	Sunk
12 March 1917	Jessamine	United Kingdom	56	Sunk
12 March 1917	Lent Lily	United Kingdom	23	Sunk
12 March 1917	Nellie	United Kingdom	61	Sunk
12 March 1917	Proverb	United Kingdom	37	Sunk
12 March 1917	Rivina	United Kingdom	22	Sunk
14 March 1917	Brika	United Kingdom	3,549	Sunk
15 March 1917	Solferino	Norway	1,155	Sunk
15 March 1917	Wilfred	Norway	1,121	Sunk
16 March 1917	Medusa	Kingdom of Italy	1,274	Sunk
16 March 1917	Sully	France	2,649	Sunk
17 April 1917	Dantzic	United Kingdom	108	Sunk
17 April 1917	William Shephard	United Kingdom	143	Sunk
19 April 1917	Old Head	United Kingdom	105	Damaged
19 April 1917	Gold Coast	United Kingdom	4,255	Sunk
19 April 1917	Jewel	United Kingdom	195	Sunk
19 April 1917	HMT Star of Freedom	Royal Navy	258	Sunk
22 April 1917	HMS Gaelic	Royal Navy	224	Damaged
23 April 1917	Tommi	United Kingdom	138	Damaged
23 April 1917	Imataka	United Kingdom	1,776	Sunk
24 April 1917	Heather	United Kingdom	58	Sunk
24 April 1917	Plutus	United Kingdom	1,189	Sunk
26 April 1917	Aigle	France	172	Sunk
26 April 1917	John Lockett	Norway	842	Sunk
18 May 1917	Mary Baird	United Kingdom	1,830	Sunk
3 June 1917	Portofino	Kingdom of Italy	1,754	Sunk
12 June 1917	HMT Carew Castle	Royal Navy	256	Sunk
14 June 1917	Dart	United Kingdom	3,207	Sunk
19 June 1917	Great City	United Kingdom	5,525	Damaged
18 July 1917	Ruth	Norway	549	Damaged
20 July 1917	Beatrice	United Kingdom	712	Sunk
20 July 1917	Bramham	United Kingdom	1,978	Sunk
31 July 1917	Fremona	United Kingdom	3,028	Sunk
31 July 1917	Motano	United States	2,730	Sunk
22 August 1917	Gro	Norway	2,667	Sunk
23 August 1917	Peer Gynt	Norway	1,144	Sunk
23 August 1917	Veghtstroom	United Kingdom	1,353	Sunk
26 August 1917	Eirini	Greece	2,452	Sunk
26 August 1917	Seresia	Belgium	2,342	Damaged
23 September 1917	Perseverance	United Kingdom	118	Sunk
24 September 1917	Mimosa	France	296	Damaged
25 September 1917	Boynton	United Kingdom	2,578	Sunk
3 October 1917	Annie F. Conlon	United States	591	Sunk
18 October 1917	Cadmus	United Kingdom	1,879	Sunk
18 October 1917	Togston	United Kingdom	1,057	Sunk
9 November 1917	Ballogie	United Kingdom	1,207	Sunk
9 November 1917	Isabelle	France	2,466	Sunk
11 November 1917	Dana	Sweden	1,620	Sunk
12 November 1917	Huibertje	Netherlands	68	Sunk
14 March 1918	Jeanne Marie	France	2,971	Sunk
