= SM UC-39 =

German World War I submarine

Coordinates: 53°56′N 0°6′E

History

German Empire
- Name: UC-39
- Ordered: 20 November 1915
- Builder: Blohm & Voss, Hamburg
- Yard number: 280
- Launched: 25 June 1916
- Commissioned: 31 October 1916
- Fate: Sunk, 8 February 1917

General characteristics
- Class & type: Type UC II submarine
- Displacement: 427 t (420 long tons), surfaced; 509 t (501 long tons), submerged
- Length: 50.35 m (165 ft 2 in) o/a; 40.30 m (132 ft 3 in) pressure hull
- Beam: 5.22 m (17 ft 2 in) o/a; 3.65 m (12 ft) pressure hull
- Draught: 3.65 m (12 ft)
- Propulsion: 2 × propeller shafts; 2 × 6-cylinder, 4-stroke diesel engines, 600 PS (440 kW; 590 shp); 2 × electric motors, 460 PS (340 kW; 450 shp)
- Speed: 11.6 knots (21.5 km/h; 13.3 mph), surfaced; 6.8 knots (12.6 km/h; 7.8 mph), submerged
- Range: 10,180 nmi (18,850 km; 11,710 mi) at 7 knots (13 km/h; 8.1 mph) surfaced; 54 nmi (100 km; 62 mi) at 4 knots (7.4 km/h; 4.6 mph) submerged
- Test depth: 50 m (160 ft)
- Complement: 26
- Armament: 6 × 100 cm (39.4 in) mine tubes; 18 × UC 200 mines; 3 × 50 cm (19.7 in) torpedo tubes (2 bow/external; one stern); 7 × torpedoes; 1 × 8.8 cm (3.5 in) Uk L/30 deck gun
- Notes: 35-second diving time

Service record
- Part of: Flandern Flotilla; 3 – 8 February 1917
- Commanders: Kptlt. Otto Heinrich Tornow; 29 October 1916 – 31 January 1917; Oblt.z.S. Otto Ehrentraut; 1 – 8 February 1917
- Operations: 1 patrol
- Victories: 3 merchant ships sunk (5,150 GRT)

SM UC-39 was a German Type UC II minelaying submarine or U-boat in the German Imperial Navy (German: Kaiserliche Marine) during World War I. The U-boat was ordered on 20 November 1915 and was launched on 25 June 1916. She was commissioned into the German Imperial Navy on 31 October 1916 as SM UC-39. (Note: "SM" stands for "Seiner Majestät" (English: His Majesty's) and combined with the U for Unterseeboot would be translated as His Majesty's Submarine.) In one patrol, UC-39 was credited with sinking three ships, either by torpedo or by mines laid. UC-39 was forced to the surface by a depth charge attack and then sunk by gunfire from the British destroyer Thrasher off Flamborough Head on 8 February 1917. Seven crew members died while 17 survived.

== Design ==
A Type UC II submarine, UC-39 had a displacement of 427 tonnes (420 long tons) when at the surface and 509 tonnes (501 long tons) while submerged. She had a length overall of 50.35 m (165 ft 2 in), a beam of 5.22 m (17 ft 2 in), and a draught of 3.65 m (12 ft). The submarine was powered by two six-cylinder four-stroke diesel engines each producing 300 metric horsepower (220 kW; 300 shp) (a total of 600 metric horsepower (440 kW; 590 shp)), two electric motors producing 460 metric horsepower (340 kW; 450 shp), and two propeller shafts. She had a dive time of 35 seconds and was capable of operating at a depth of 50 metres (160 ft).

The submarine had a maximum surface speed of 11.9 knots (22.0 km/h; 13.7 mph) and a submerged speed of 6.6 knots (12.2 km/h; 7.6 mph). When submerged, she could operate for 54 nautical miles (100 km; 62 mi) at 6.8 knots (12.6 km/h; 7.8 mph); when surfaced, she could travel 10,180 nautical miles (18,850 km; 11,710 mi) at 7 knots (13 km/h; 8.1 mph). UC-39 was fitted with six 100 centimetres (39 in) mine tubes, eighteen UC 200 mines, three 50 centimetres (20 in) torpedo tubes (one on the stern and two on the bow), seven torpedoes, and one 8.8 cm (3.5 in) Uk L/30 deck gun. Her complement was twenty-six crew members.

== Summary of raiding history ==
Date	Name	Nationality	Tonnage (Note: Merchant ship tonnages are in gross register tons. Military vessels are listed by tons displacement.)	Fate
7 February 1917	Hans Kinck	Norway	2,667	Sunk
8 February 1917	Hanna Larsen	United Kingdom	1,311	Sunk
8 February 1917	Ida	Norway	1,172	Sunk
