= SM UC-66 =

German Type UC II minelaying U-boat

Coordinates: 50°31′N 0°27′E

History

German Empire
- Name: UC-66
- Ordered: 12 January 1916
- Builder: Blohm & Voss, Hamburg
- Yard number: 282
- Launched: 15 July 1916
- Commissioned: 14 November 1916
- Fate: Sunk on 27 May 1917

General characteristics
- Class & type: Type UC II submarine
- Displacement: 427 t (420 long tons), surfaced; 508 t (500 long tons), submerged
- Length: 50.35 m (165 ft 2 in) o/a; 40.30 m (132 ft 3 in) pressure hull
- Beam: 5.22 m (17 ft 2 in) o/a; 3.65 m (12 ft) pressure hull
- Draught: 3.64 m (11 ft 11 in)
- Propulsion: 2 × propeller shafts; 2 × 6-cylinder, 4-stroke diesel engines, 600 PS (440 kW; 590 shp); 2 × electric motors, 620 PS (460 kW; 610 shp)
- Speed: 12.0 knots (22.2 km/h; 13.8 mph), surfaced; 7.4 knots (13.7 km/h; 8.5 mph), submerged
- Range: 10,420 nmi (19,300 km; 11,990 mi) at 7 knots (13 km/h; 8.1 mph) surfaced; 52 nmi (96 km; 60 mi) at 4 knots (7.4 km/h; 4.6 mph) submerged
- Test depth: 50 m (160 ft)
- Complement: 26
- Armament: 6 × 100 cm (39.4 in) mine tubes; 18 × UC 200 mines; 3 × 50 cm (19.7 in) torpedo tubes (2 bow/external; one stern); 7 × torpedoes; 1 × 8.8 cm (3.5 in) Uk L/30 deck gun
- Notes: 35-second diving time

Service record
- Part of: Flandern Flotilla; 3 February – 27 May 1917
- Commanders: Oblt.z.S. Herbert Pustkuchen; 18 November 1916 – 27 May 1917
- Operations: 5 patrols
- Victories: 29 merchant ships sunk (41,793 GRT); 2 warships sunk (2,500 tons); 1 auxiliary warship sunk (213 GRT); 4 merchant ships damaged (15,188 GRT); 2 auxiliary warships damaged (12,222 GRT)

SM UC-66 was a German Type UC II minelaying submarine or U-boat in the German Imperial Navy (German: Kaiserliche Marine) during World War I. The U-boat was ordered on 12 January 1916 and was launched on 15 July 1916. She was commissioned into the German Imperial Navy on 14 November 1916 as SM UC-66. (Note: "SM" stands for "Seiner Majestät" (English: His Majesty's) and combined with the U for Unterseeboot would be translated as His Majesty's Submarine.) In five patrols UC-66 was credited with sinking 32 ships, either by torpedo or by mines laid. UC-66 was sunk by HM seaplane No. 8656, a Curtiss Model H-12, off the Isles of Scilly on 27 May 1917. The wreck was found by divers in 2009. This is a notable early aircraft success against a U-boat.

== Design ==
A Type UC II submarine, UC-66 had a displacement of 427 tonnes (420 long tons) when at the surface and 508 tonnes (500 long tons) while submerged. She had a length overall of 50.35 m (165 ft 2 in), a beam of 5.22 m (17 ft 2 in), and a draught of 3.64 m (11 ft 11 in). The submarine was powered by two six-cylinder four-stroke diesel engines each producing 300 metric horsepower (220 kW; 300 shp) (a total of 600 metric horsepower (440 kW; 590 shp)), two electric motors producing 620 metric horsepower (460 kW; 610 shp), and two propeller shafts. She had a dive time of 48 seconds and was capable of operating at a depth of 50 metres (160 ft).

The submarine had a maximum surface speed of 12 knots (22 km/h; 14 mph) and a submerged speed of 7.4 knots (13.7 km/h; 8.5 mph). When submerged, she could operate for 52 nautical miles (96 km; 60 mi) at 4 knots (7.4 km/h; 4.6 mph); when surfaced, she could travel 10,420 nautical miles (19,300 km; 11,990 mi) at 7 knots (13 km/h; 8.1 mph). UC-66 was fitted with six 100 centimetres (39 in) mine tubes, eighteen UC 200 mines, three 50 centimetres (20 in) torpedo tubes (one on the stern and two on the bow), seven torpedoes, and one 8.8 cm (3.5 in) Uk L/30 deck gun. Her complement was twenty-six crew members.

== Summary of raiding history ==
Date	Name	Nationality	Tonnage (Note: Merchant ship tonnages are in gross register tons. Military vessels are listed by tons displacement.)	Fate
11 February 1917	Ada	United Kingdom	187	Sunk
11 February 1917	Vasilissa Olga	Greece	1,400	Sunk
11 February 1917	Woodfield	United Kingdom	4,300	Damaged
12 February 1917	Afric	United Kingdom	11,999	Sunk
12 February 1917	Lucent	United Kingdom	1,409	Sunk
15 February 1917	Alma Jeanne	France	33	Sunk
15 February 1917	Argos	France	26	Sunk
15 February 1917	Desire Louise	France	31	Sunk
17 February 1917	Driebergen	Netherlands	1,884	Sunk
17 February 1917	Ootmarsum	Netherlands	2,313	Sunk
17 February 1917	Trompenberg	Netherlands	1,608	Sunk
21 February 1917	Energy	United Kingdom	25	Sunk
21 February 1917	K.L.M.	United Kingdom	28	Sunk
21 February 1917	Monarch	United Kingdom	35	Sunk
22 February 1917	Ambon	Netherlands	3,598	Damaged
11 March 1917	HMS Bayard	Royal Navy	220	Damaged
12 March 1917	Einar Jarl	Norway	1,849	Sunk
12 March 1917	Forget-Me-Not	United Kingdom	40	Sunk
12 March 1917	Glynymel	United Kingdom	1,394	Sunk
12 March 1917	Memnon	United Kingdom	3,203	Sunk
12 March 1917	Reindeer	United Kingdom	52	Sunk
13 March 1917	Try	United Kingdom	34	Sunk
17 March 1917	City of Memphis	United States	5,252	Sunk
17 March 1917	HMS Mignonette	Royal Navy	1,250	Sunk
18 March 1917	HMS Alyssum	Royal Navy	1,250	Sunk
19 March 1917	Armoricain	France	261	Sunk
20 March 1917	HMHS Asturias	Royal Navy	12,002	Damaged
20 March 1917	Hazelpark	United Kingdom	1,964	Sunk
21 March 1917	Avance	United Kingdom	57	Sunk
22 March 1917	Efeu	Norway	569	Sunk
17 April 1917	Clan Sutherland	United Kingdom	2,820	Damaged
22 April 1917	Arethusa	United Kingdom	1,279	Sunk
23 April 1917	HMT Rose II	Royal Navy	213	Sunk
27 April 1917	Quantock	United Kingdom	4,470	Damaged
1 May 1917	Bagdale	United Kingdom	3,045	Sunk
1 May 1917	John W. Pearn	United Kingdom	76	Sunk
1 May 1917	La Manche	France	335	Sunk
25 May 1917	Sjaelland	United Kingdom	1,405	Sunk
