= Tees Bay =

Bay in County Durham, England

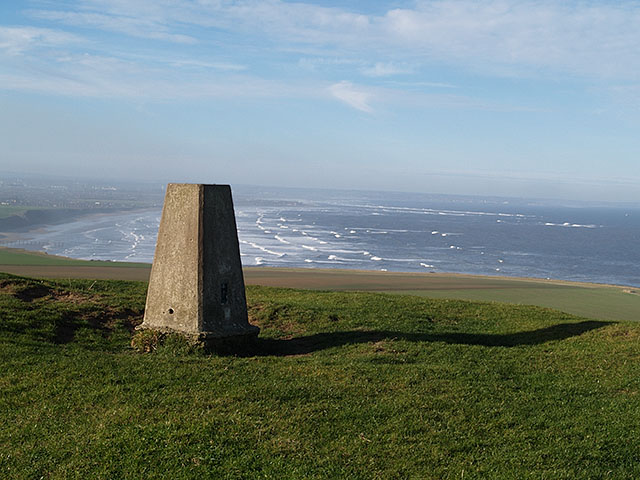
- View across Tees Bay

- Location: County Durham, England, United Kingdom
- Coordinates: 54°39′48″N 1°6′23″W

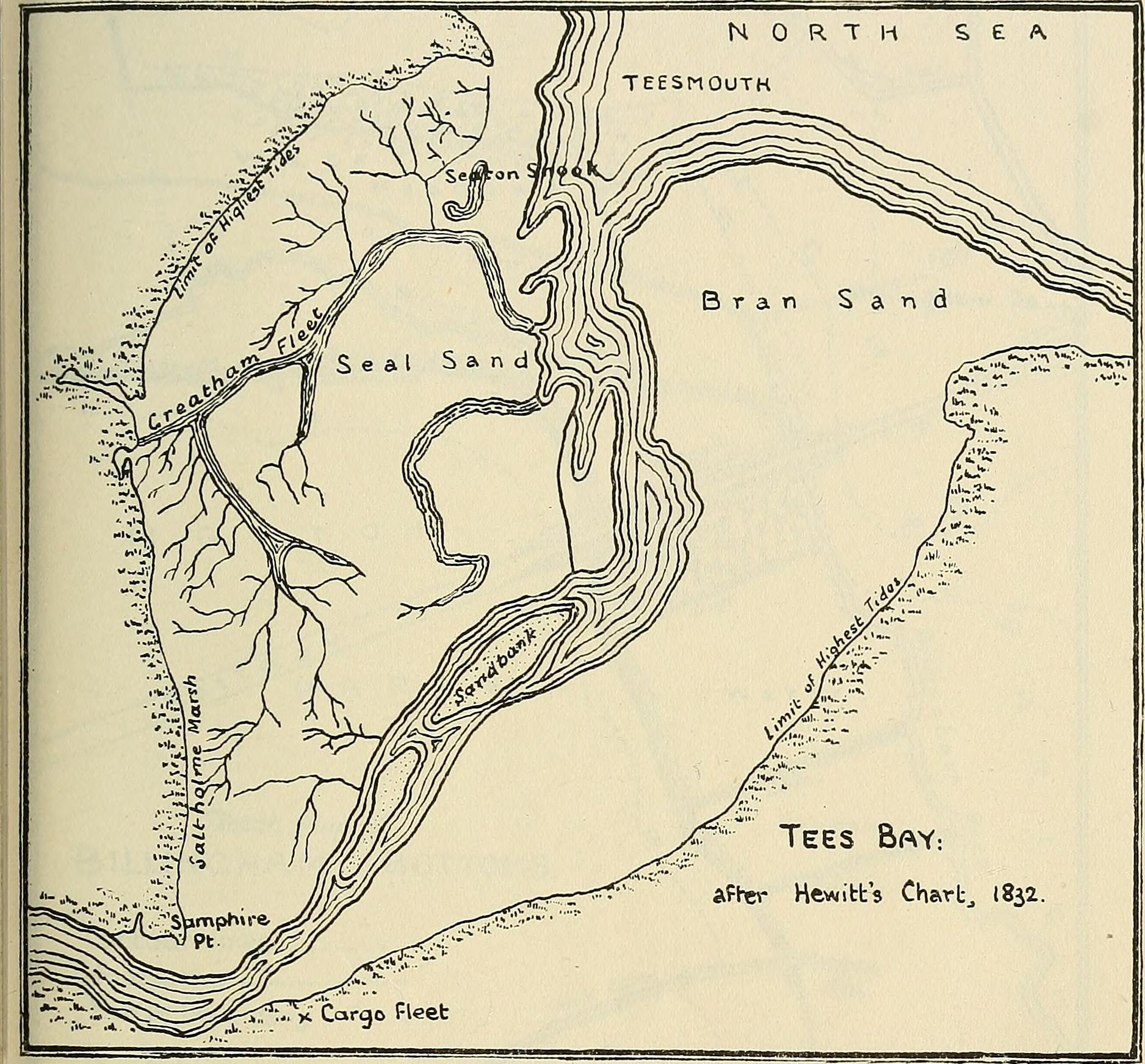
Historic map of Tees Bay

Tees Bay is a bay in County Durham, England, between Hartlepool and Redcar, where the River Tees flows into the North Sea.
