= SM U-83 =

History

German Empire
- Name: U-83
- Ordered: 23 June 1915
- Builder: Germaniawerft, Kiel
- Yard number: 253
- Laid down: 23 October 1915
- Launched: 13 July 1916
- Commissioned: 6 September 1916
- Fate: Sunk, 17 February 1917

General characteristics
- Displacement: 808 t (795 long tons) surfaced; 946 t (931 long tons) submerged
- Length: 70.06 m (229 ft 10 in) (o/a); 55.55 m (182 ft 3 in) (pressure hull)
- Beam: 6.30 m (20 ft 8 in) (oa); 4.15 m (13 ft 7 in) (pressure hull)
- Height: 8.00 m (26 ft 3 in)
- Draught: 4.02 m (13 ft 2 in)
- Installed power: 2 × 2,400 PS (1,765 kW; 2,367 shp) surfaced; 2 × 1,200 PS (883 kW; 1,184 shp) submerged
- Propulsion: 2 shafts, 2 × 1.70 m (5 ft 7 in) propellers
- Speed: 16.8 knots (31.1 km/h; 19.3 mph) surfaced; 9.1 knots (16.9 km/h; 10.5 mph) submerged
- Range: 11,220 nmi (20,780 km; 12,910 mi) at 8 knots (15 km/h; 9.2 mph) surfaced; 56 nmi (104 km; 64 mi) at 5 knots (9.3 km/h; 5.8 mph) submerged
- Test depth: 50 m (160 ft)
- Complement: 4 officers, 31 enlisted
- Armament: 4 × 50 cm (19.7 in) torpedo tubes (two bow, two stern); 12-16 torpedoes; 1 × 10.5 cm (4.1 in) SK L/45 deck gun

Service record
- Part of: IV Flotilla; 31 October 1916 – 17 February 1917
- Commanders: Kapitänleutnant Bruno Hoppe; 6 September 1916 – 17 February 1917
- Operations: 2 patrols
- Victories: 6 merchant ships sunk (6,450 GRT); 1 auxiliary warship damaged (3,207 GRT)

SM U-83 was a Type U 81 U-boat of the German Imperial Navy (German: Kaiserliche Marine) during the First World War. She had been commissioned and deployed to operate off the coast of the British Isles and attack coastal shipping as part of the German U-boat campaign.

In a six-month career, U-83 made two combat patrols into the South-Western Approaches during the Atlantic campaign. In these patrols she sank six merchant ships for 6,450 gross register tons (GRT). On 17 February 1917, she torpedoed the British Q-ship HMS Farnborough off the Irish coast, but was sunk at 51°34′N 11°23′W by Farnborough's hidden armaments when she approached too close. There were just 2 survivors, picked up by Farnborough; 35 of her crew perished. Farnborough was commanded by the submarine hunter Gordon Campbell and had on board later Victoria Cross recipients Ronald Niel Stuart and William Williams.

== Design ==
Type U 81 submarines were preceded by the shorter Type UE I submarines. U-83 had a displacement of 808 tonnes (795 long tons) when at the surface and 946 tonnes (931 long tons) while submerged. She had a total length of 70.06 m (229 ft 10 in), a pressure hull length of 55.55 m (182 ft 3 in), a beam of 6.30 m (20 ft 8 in), a height of 8 m (26 ft 3 in), and a draught of 4.02 m (13 ft 2 in). The submarine was powered by two 2,400 metric horsepower (1,800 kW; 2,400 shp) engines for use while surfaced, and two 1,200 metric horsepower (880 kW; 1,200 shp) engines for use while submerged. She had two propeller shafts. She was capable of operating at depths of up to 50 metres (160 ft).

The submarine had a maximum surface speed of 16.8 knots (31.1 km/h; 19.3 mph) and a maximum submerged speed of 9.1 knots (16.9 km/h; 10.5 mph). When submerged, she could operate for 56 nautical miles (104 km; 64 mi) at 5 knots (9.3 km/h; 5.8 mph); when surfaced, she could travel 11,220 nautical miles (20,780 km; 12,910 mi) at 8 knots (15 km/h; 9.2 mph). U-83 was fitted with four 50 centimetres (20 in) torpedo tubes (two at the bow and two at the stern), twelve to sixteen torpedoes, and one 10.5 cm (4.1 in) SK L/45 deck gun. She had a complement of thirty-five (thirty-one crew members and four officers).

== Summary of raiding history ==
Date	Name	Nationality	Tonnage (Note: Merchant ship tonnages are in gross register tons. Military vessels are listed by tons displacement.)	Fate
17 December 1916	Niord	Sweden	123	Sunk
4 February 1917	Anna Maria	France	141	Sunk
4 February 1917	Coquette	France	167	Sunk
6 February 1917	Crown Point	United Kingdom	5,218	Sunk
7 February 1917	Diaz	Russian Empire	637	Sunk
10 February 1917	Paquerette	France	164	Sunk
17 February 1917	HMS Farnborough	Royal Navy	3,207	Damaged

== Bibliography ==
- Gröner, Erich; Jung, Dieter; Maass, Martin (1991). U-boats and Mine Warfare Vessels. German Warships 1815–1945. Vol. 2. Translated by Thomas, Keith; Magowan, Rachel. London: Conway Maritime Press. ISBN 0-85177-593-4.
