= Centurion (ship) =

Several ships have been named Centurion for the Roman military rank of Centurion.

== Centurion (1804 ship) ==
- Centurion (1804 ship) was launched in 1804. She initially sailed as a West Indiaman. She made one voyage to India. She then sailed between Britain and Quebec City. Centurion was last listed in 1839, but with data stale since 1834. Centurion, Heppinstall, master, was wrecked in 1848.

== Centurion (1811 ship) ==
- Centurion, of 536 tons (bm), was launched at Whitby in 1811 by Fishburn and Broderick, who were also her owners. On 25 December, she was under the command of Captain William Kelly when she was wrecked. She was serving as a government transport and part of a convoy under the escort by HMS Hero and HMS Grasshopper when she was lost off the Texel with the loss of all hands.

== Other ==
- Centurion was a full-rigged ship that on 19 February 1917, SM UC-17 (Imperial German Navy) scuttled in the English Channel 15 nautical miles (28 km) south east of The Lizard, Cornwall. Centurion's crew survived.

== See also ==
- HMS Centurion – one of eight vessels of the Royal Navy; also a shore establishment.
