= SS California (1907) =

Twin-screw steamer of the Anchor Line

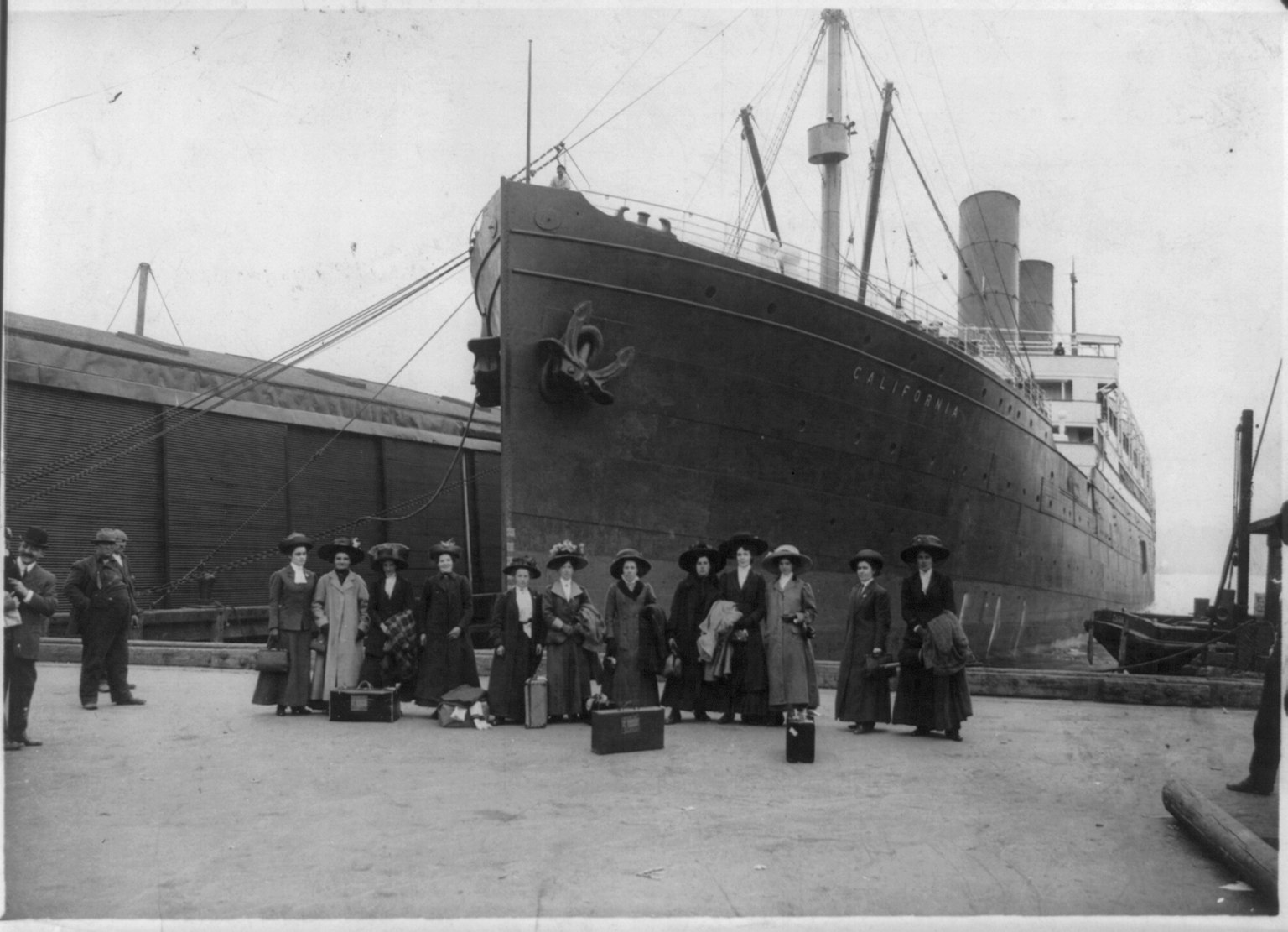
- California delivering brides to New York in 1911

History

United Kingdom
- Name: California
- Namesake: California
- Owner: Anchor Line
- Operator: Henderson Bros.
- Port of registry: Glasgow
- Route: Glasgow – New York
- Builder: D&W Henderson & Co, Glasgow
- Yard number: 459
- Laid down: 1904
- Launched: 9 July 1907
- In service: 1907
- Identification: official number 124230; code letters HLQJ; call sign MCI
- Fate: Sunk by torpedo, 1917

General characteristics
- Type: Ocean liner
- Tonnage: 8,669 GRT, 5,403 NRT
- Length: 470 ft (140 m)
- Beam: 58.3 ft (17.8 m)
- Depth: 34 ft (10 m)
- Decks: 3
- Installed power: 827 NHP
- Propulsion: twin screws; 2 × triple-expansion engines
- Speed: 16 knots (30 km/h)
- Capacity: 1,214 passengers
- Crew: 200

SS California was a twin-screw steamer that D. and W. Henderson and Company of Glasgow built for the Anchor Line in 1907 as a replacement for the aging ocean liner Astoria, which had been in continuous service since 1884. She worked the Glasgow to New York transatlantic route and was sunk by the German submarine SM U-85 on 7 February 1917.

== Building ==
California was 8,662 GRT and 5,403 NRT, with a length of 470 feet (140 m), a beam of 58.3 ft (17.8 m) and a depth of 34 ft (10 m). The California had three decks: the poop deck was 70 feet (21 m) long, the bridge 213 feet (65 m) long and the forecastle 91 ft (28 m) long. She had two black funnels and two masts. She had twin screw propellers, each driven by a three-cylinder triple-expansion engine. The combined power of her twin engines was rated at 827 NHP, and gave her a speed of 16 knots (30 km/h). Her builders also built her engines. She had berths for of 1,214 passengers: 232 first class, 248 second class and 734 third class. She had the latest equipment, including electric light.

== Launch ==
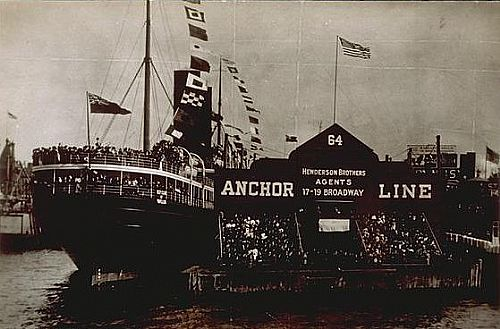
California in New York Harbor around 1907

She was launched on 9 July 1907, having been christened by the Lady Ure Primrose, wife of Sir John Ure Primrose, Lord Lieutenant of the County of the City of Glasgow. Captain J Blaikie was appointed to the ship that same year.

Anchor Line registered California at Glasgow. Her UK official number was 124230 and her code letters were HLQJ. Her maiden voyage from Glasgow to New York began on 12 October 1907. By 1913 California was equipped for wireless telegraphy, supplied and operated by the Marconi Company. Her call sign was MCI.

== Grounding on Tory Island ==
On 28 June 1914 California ran aground on Tory Island off the north-west coast of Ireland in dense fog with over 1,000 passengers on board. The ship’s bows caved in upon impact, and though she took on water through two holes in her hold she remained above water. Three British warships including the destroyer HMS Swift, as well as the ocean liner Cassandra, aided the stricken ship and helped transfer stranded passengers ashore. The ship was towed back to Glasgow on 20 August 1914, and less than two months later was repaired and refloated. She resumed Glasgow – Liverpool – New York sailings for the Cunard – Anchor joint service on 13 October 1915.

== Fire in Manhattan ==
Shortly after 8 pm on 13 May 1916 a fire began in her Number 1 cargo hold as she was docked at Pier 64 on the North River in Manhattan. Of great concern to firefighters and her crew was that she being loaded with, among other things, war munitions destined for Liverpool, England. The quick action of the Superintendent of the Pier, and his subsequent sounding of the alarm, led to a quick response by a nearby fireboat that assisted the crew in fighting the blaze. The fire was successfully extinguished shortly after 1030 pm that same night. The fire was deemed accidental, and as damage was minimal, she sailed the next Monday as scheduled. Had the fire not been noticed by the superintendent in time, or had the ship been fully loaded with munitions when the fire erupted, the ship and surrounding section of Manhattan might have sustained a catastrophe comparable with the Halifax Explosion.

== Loss ==
California sailed on her last Glasgow to New York voyage on 12 January 1917. She began her return voyage on 29 January 1917 with 184 crew and 31 passengers on board. On 3 February 1917, as she sailed on her return trip towards Scotland, German U-boats attacked and sank the Housatonic, an act which led to the breaking off of diplomatic relations between the United States and the German Empire.

On the morning of 7 February 1917, homeward-bound and approaching Ireland at full steam, she was attacked by SM U-85 commanded by Kapitänleutnant Willy Petz. The U-boat fired two torpedoes at California. One struck her on the port quarter near her Number 4 hatch. Five people were killed instantly in the explosion; 36 people drowned either as the ship went down or when one filled lifeboat was swamped in the wake of the burning ship, which steamed ahead losing little headway as she went down. She sank in nine minutes, 38 miles (61 km) W by S of Fastnet Rock, Ireland with a loss of 41 lives. Though Captain John L Henderson stayed on the bridge and went down with his ship, but escaped, reached the surface of the sea and was rescued.

On 12 March 1917 the Q-ship HMS Privet sank U-85. Posing as an unarmed merchant ship, Privet lured the U-boat to the surface after sustaining heavy damage in an unprovoked attack by the submarine. As Privet's crew feigned abandoning ship, they uncovered the ship’s hidden guns and opened fire on the submarine at close range. U-85 was sunk by gunfire, and Petz and his crew of 37 men were killed.

== Bibliography ==
- Lloyd's Register of Shipping. Vol. I–Steamers. London: Lloyd's Register of Shipping. 1914.
- The Marconi Press Agency Ltd (1913). The Year Book of Wireless Telegraphy and Telephony. London: The St Katherine Press.
- "Liner’s passengers given no chance." (9 February 1917). Boston Daily Globe, p. 1.
- "California sunk, no American lost." (8 February 1917). Boston Daily Globe, p. 1.
- "Consul reports that two torpedoes were fired into California." (8 February 1917). Chicago Daily Tribune, p. 1.
- "Liner sunk, no warning." (8 February 1917). Chicago Daily Tribune, p. 1.
- "Another British ship sunk: bound for an American port." (14 May 1916). The New York Times, p. 1.
- "41 persons lost on anchor liner." (9 February 1917). The Atlanta Constitution, p. 1.
- "Liner California goes on the rocks." (29 June 1914). The Atlanta Constitution, p. 1.
