= Type U 81 submarine =

Class of U-boats

Class overview
- Builders: Germaniawerft, Kiel
- Operators: Imperial German Navy
- Preceded by: Type UE I
- Succeeded by: Type U 87
- Completed: 6
- Lost: 4

General characteristics
- Displacement: 808 t (795 long tons) surfaced; 946 t (931 long tons) submerged
- Length: 70.06 m (229 ft 10 in) (o/a); 55.55 m (182 ft 3 in) (pressure hull)
- Beam: 6.30 m (20 ft 8 in) (oa); 4.15 m (13 ft 7 in) (pressure hull)
- Height: 8.00 m (26 ft 3 in)
- Draught: 4.02 m (13 ft 2 in)
- Installed power: 2 × 2,400 PS (1,765 kW; 2,367 shp) surfaced; 2 × 1,200 PS (883 kW; 1,184 shp) submerged
- Propulsion: 2 shafts, 2 × 1.70 m (5 ft 7 in) propellers
- Speed: 16.8 knots (31.1 km/h; 19.3 mph) surfaced; 9.1 knots (16.9 km/h; 10.5 mph) submerged
- Range: 11,220 nmi (20,780 km; 12,910 mi) at 8 knots (15 km/h; 9.2 mph) surfaced; 56 nmi (104 km; 64 mi) at 5 knots (9.3 km/h; 5.8 mph) submerged
- Test depth: 50 m (164 ft 1 in)
- Complement: 4 officers, 31 enlisted
- Armament: 4 × 50 cm (19.7 in) torpedo tubes (two bow, two stern); 12-16 torpedoes; 1 × 10.5 cm (4.1 in) SK L/45 deck gun

Type 81 was a class of U-boats built during World War I for the Kaiserliche Marine.

== Design ==
Type 81 U-boats carried 12 torpedoes and had various arrangements of deck guns. U 81 to U 83 had one 10.5-centimetre (4.1 in) deck gun with 140-240 rounds. U 84 - U 86 were constructed with two 8.8-centimetre (3.5 in) deck guns. In 1917, U 84 - U 86 were converted to a carry one 10.5 cm and one 8.8 cm deck gun and carried 240 rounds.

They carried a crew of four officers and 31 men and had excellent seagoing abilities with a cruising range of around 11,220 nautical miles (20,780 km; 12,910 mi). Many arrangements from the Type 81 and the next two types were also seen on the World War II Type IX U-boats when their design work took place 20 years later.

Compared to the previous type 63, the 81s were 1.7 metres (5 ft 7 in) longer, while the pressure hull remained the same. They were .3 knots (0.56 km/h; 0.35 mph) faster on the surface, and .1 knots (0.19 km/h; 0.12 mph) faster submerged and increased range by 1,030 nautical miles (1,910 km; 1,190 mi) to 11,200 nmi at 8 knots. They carried 12 torpedoes instead of 6, and by 1917 all type 87s had the larger 10.5 cm deck gun versus the twin 8.8 cm on the 63s. Crew size was decreased by 1 to 35.

Compared to the following type 87, the 81s were 4.26 metres (14.0 ft) longer, yet 5 tons lighter. Their range was 180 miles shorter, but speed was 1.2 knots (2.2 km/h; 1.4 mph) faster on the surface and .5 knots (0.93 km/h; 0.58 mph) faster submerged. The most significant difference was the addition of 4 more torpedoes and 2 additional bow tubes on the type 87. Type 87 also got the additional crew member back and numbered 36 again.

== Service history ==
Type 81 boats were responsible for sinking 3.537% of all Allied shipping sunk during the war, accounting for a total of 427,247 combined tons. They also damaged 89,522 combined tons, and captured 3,462 combined tons.

Boat	Sunk	Damaged	Captured	Total
U-81	88,483	3,481	0	91,964
U-82	108,310	32,914	0	141,224
U-83	6,450	3,207	0	9,657
U-84	86,196	42,149	3,462	131,807
U-85	20,225	7,608	0	27,883
U-86	117,583	163	0	117,746
Totals	427,247	89,522	3,462	520,281

== Bibliography ==
- Gröner, Erich; Jung, Dieter; Maass, Martin (1991). U-boats and Mine Warfare Vessels. German Warships 1815–1945. Vol. 2. Translated by Thomas, Keith; Magowan, Rachel. London: Conway Maritime Press. ISBN 0-85177-593-4.
