= HMS Thrasher (1895) =

Destroyer of the Royal Navy

History

United Kingdom
- Name: Thrasher
- Builder: Laird, Son & Co., Birkenhead
- Yard number: 608
- Laid down: 30 May 1895
- Launched: 5 November 1895
- Commissioned: June 1897
- Fate: Sold for disposal, 4 November 1919

General characteristics
- Class & type: Quail-class destroyer
- Displacement: 355 long tons (361 t) light; 415 long tons (422 t) full load
- Length: 218 ft (66 m)
- Beam: 21 ft 6 in (6.55 m)
- Draught: 9 ft 6 in (2.90 m)
- Propulsion: Triple expansion steam engines; Coal-fired Normand boilers; 6,300 hp (4,698 kW)
- Speed: 30 knots (56 km/h; 35 mph)
- Complement: 63
- Armament: 1 × QF 12-pounder gun, 5 × 6-pounder guns, 2 × 18 inch (450 mm) torpedo tubes

HMS Thrasher was a "thirty-knotter" torpedo boat destroyer of the British Royal Navy. She was completed by Laird, Son & Company, Birkenhead, in 1897. One of four Quail-class destroyers (later classed as part of the B-class), she served in the First World War, sinking the German submarine UC-39 in 1917, and was sold off after hostilities ended.

== Design and construction ==
As part of its 1894–1895 shipbuilding programme for the Royal Navy, the British Admiralty placed orders with Laird Brothers for four destroyers. The destroyers ordered under the 1894–1895 programme had a contracted speed of 30 knots (56 km/h; 35 mph) rather than the 27 knots (50 km/h; 31 mph) required of previous destroyers. Armament was specified to be a QF 12 pounder 12 cwt (3 in (76 mm) calibre), with a secondary armament of five 6-pounder guns, and two 18-inch (450 mm) torpedo tubes. As with other early Royal Navy destroyers, the detailed design was left to the builder, with the Admiralty laying down only broad requirements.

Laird's four ships were each powered by two four-cylinder triple expansion steam engines, fed by four Normand boilers, rated at 6,300 ihp (4,700 kW), and were fitted with four funnels. They had an overall length of 218 feet (66.45 m), a beam of 21 feet 6 inches (6.55 m) and a draught of 9 feet 6 inches (2.90 m). Displacement was 355 long tons (361 t) light and 415 long tons (422 t) full load, while crew was 63.

Thrasher was laid down at Laird's Birkenhead shipyard as Yard Number 608 on 30 May 1895, as the third of the four destroyers ordered from Laird's, and was launched on 5 November 1895. She reached a speed of 30.000 knots (55.560 km/h; 34.523 mph) over a measured mile and an average speed of 30.015 knots (55.588 km/h; 34.541 mph) over three hours during trials on 14 December 1896. Thrasher commissioned in June 1897.

== Service history ==
=== Pre-war service ===
Newly commissioned, Thrasher took part in the naval review off Spithead on 26 June 1897 to celebrate the Diamond Jubilee of Queen Victoria. On 20 August 1897, Thrasher collided with the cruiser Phaeton in the English Channel, killing one crewmember. Thrasher's helmsman was blamed for the accident by a court-martial and was dismissed from the ship. On 29 September 1897, Thrasher and the destroyer Lynx ran aground in a fog off Dodman Point, Cornwall. The grounding caused a steam main aboard Thrasher to rupture, killing four stokers. While both ships were refloated, Thrasher was badly damaged and after repair was no longer as fast as her sister ships. The ship's commanding officer, Commander Travers, was severely reprimanded by the resulting court-martial.

On 5 December 1901 Thrasher was commissioned by Lieutenant and Commander C. D. S. Raikes as tender to the battleship Formidable on the Mediterranean station. She left Devonport for Malta in January the following year, returning to home waters in 1906. While at Malta she was in May 1902 again involved a collision, with the destroyer Coquette, and had her stern damaged. In early January 1903 she took part in a three-weeks cruise with other ships of her squadron in the Greek islands around Corfu. In 1910, Thrasher formed part of the Fifth Destroyer Flotilla.

On 30 August 1912 the Admiralty directed all destroyers were to be grouped into classes designated by letters based on contract speed and appearance. As a four-funneled 30-knotter destroyer, Thrasher was assigned to the B Class. In 1912, older destroyers were transferred to patrol flotillas, with Thrasher forming part of the Seventh Flotilla, based at Devonport, by March 1913. Thrasher, still based at Devonport as part of the Seventh Flotilla, took part in the search for the missing submarine A7 (which had sunk in Whitsand Bay, Cornwall on 16 January), with Thrasher's commanding officer dying of a chill caught during the search.

=== First World War ===
On the outbreak of the First World War, the Seventh Flotilla moved to the East coast of England. Thrasher remained with the Flotilla through 1915 and 1916. On 8 February 1917, Thrasher spotted the German submarine UC-39 while the submarine was in the process of attacking a merchant ship off Flamborough Head, Yorkshire. When UC-39 dived, Thrasher responded with a depth charge which badly damaged the submarine, which was forced to the surface. Thrasher fired on the surfaced submarine until it was realised that UC-39's crew was surrendering. Thrasher rescued 17 Germans together with two British sailors who had been held prisoner aboard UC-39, with seven Germans killed. UC-39 sank while attempts were being made to tow the submarine to port.

By September 1917, Thrasher transferred to the local Patrol Flotilla on the Nore, remaining on that station until the end of the war. Thrasher was sold for scrap on 4 November 1919.

== Pennant numbers ==
Pennant number	Date
D79	1914
D94	August 1915
D90	January 1918
