= List of shipwrecks in April 1917 =

The list of shipwrecks in April 1917 includes ships sunk, foundered, grounded, or otherwise lost during April 1917.

== 1 April ==
List of shipwrecks: 1 April 1917
Ship	State	Description
Aztec	United States	World War I: The cargo ship was sunk in the Atlantic Ocean off Ouessant, Finistère, France (48°20′N 6°00′W) by SM U-46 (Imperial German Navy) with the loss of 27 crew, and one gunner missing. One lifeboat was smashed against her hull during launch, and another was lost after launch.
Bergenhus	Denmark	World War I: The passenger ship was sunk in the North Sea 130 nautical miles (240 km) east of the Farne Islands, Northumberland, United Kingdom by SM UC-40 (Imperial German Navy). There were no casualties.
Camilla	Norway	World War I: The cargo ship was sunk in the North Sea 150 nautical miles (280 km) west of Skudesneshavn, Rogaland (56°32′N 3°59′E) by SM UB-35 (Imperial German Navy) with the loss of eight of her crew.
Consul Persson	Norway	World War I: The cargo ship was sunk in the North Sea (58°21′N 2°55′E) by SM U-54 (Imperial German Navy). Her crew survived.
Eastern Belle	United Kingdom	World War I: The ketch was scuttled in the English Channel 30 nautical miles (56 km) southwest of St. Catherine's Point, Isle of Wight by SM UC-72 (Imperial German Navy). Her crew survived.
Endymion	United Kingdom	World War I: The ketch was shelled and sunk in the English Channel off Start Point, Devon by SM UB-32 (Imperial German Navy) with the loss of four crew.
Ester	Denmark	World War I: The cargo ship was sunk in the North Sea (56°32′N 4°18′E) by SM UB-35 (Imperial German Navy). Her crew survived.
Fjelland	Norway	World War I: The coaster was sunk in the North Sea 50 nautical miles (93 km) south west by west of Utsire, Rogaland (58°20′N 5°50′E) by SM U-54 (Imperial German Navy) with the loss of a crew member.
Jolie Brise	France	World War I: The fishing vessel was sunk in the Atlantic Ocean 20 nautical miles (37 km) off Audierne, Finistère by SM UB-36 (Imperial German Navy).
Kasenga	United Kingdom	World War I: The cargo ship was torpedoed and sunk in the Mediterranean Sea 2 nautical miles (3.7 km) off Cape Palos, Spain by an enemy submarine.
Maria Santissima D. Grazie	Italy	World War I: The sailing vessel was sunk in the Mediterranean Sea off Sicily by SM U-65 (Imperial German Navy).
Maria T.	Italy	World War I: The sailing vessel was sunk in the Mediterranean Sea off Sicily by SM U-65 (Imperial German Navy).
Providence de Dieu	France	World War I: The fishing vessel was sunk in the Atlantic Ocean 20 nautical miles (37 km) off Audierne by SM UB-36 (Imperial German Navy).
Silvia	United Kingdom	World War I: The schooner was scuttled in the English Channel 15 nautical miles (28 km) south south east of the Owers Lightship (United Kingdom) (50°19′N 0°28′W) by SM UB-39 (Imperial German Navy). Her crew survived.
Warren	United Kingdom	World War I: The cargo ship was torpedoed and sunk in the Tyrrhenian Sea 20 nautical miles (37 km) south west of Civitavecchia, Lazio, Italy (41°51′N 11°22′E) by SM UC-38 (Imperial German Navy) with the loss of three of her crew. Her captain was taken as a prisoner of war.
Zambesi	United Kingdom	World War I: The collier was torpedoed and sunk in the Mediterranean Sea 15 nautical miles (28 km) north by west of Alexandria, Egypt (31°26′N 29°49′E) by SM U-63 (Imperial German Navy) with the loss of three crew.

== 2 April ==
List of shipwrecks: 2 April 1917
Ship	State	Description
Britannia	United Kingdom	World War I: The cargo ship torpedoed and was sunk in the Mediterranean Sea 22 nautical miles (41 km) west north west of Pantelleria, Italy (36°35′N 11°28′E) by SM U-65 (Imperial German Navy). Her crew survived, but two of them were taken as prisoners of war.
HMT Commandant	Royal Navy	World War I: The naval trawler struck a mine placed by SM UC-7 (Imperial German Navy) and sank in the North Sea off the Sunk Lightship (United Kingdom) (51°33′N 1°36′E) with the loss of five of her crew.
Filicudi	Regia Marina	World War I: The naval tug struck a mine placed by SM UC-38 (Imperial German Navy) and sank in the Mediterranean Sea off Trapani, Sicily.
Havlyst	Norway	World War I: The coaster was sunk in the North Sea off Lindesnes, Vest-Agder (57°30′N 6°50′E) by SM U-54 (Imperial German Navy). Her crew survived.
Anna Fostenes	Norway	World War I: The cargo ship was sunk, probably by a floating mine, 90 miles (140 km) north of Terschelling, with the loss of eight crewman.
Lord Scarborough	United Kingdom	World War I: The trawler was sunk in the North Sea 100 nautical miles (190 km) east of the Isle of May, Fife by SM UB-35 (Imperial German Navy). Her crew was rescued by the trawler HMT Aracari (Royal Navy) two days later.
Sagitta	Norway	World War I: The barque was sunk in the North Sea (60°00′N 2°00′W) by SM U-78 (Imperial German Navy). Her crew survived.
Snespurven	Norway	World War I: The barque was shelled and sunk in the Atlantic Ocean 25 nautical miles (46 km) south south west of the Tuskar Rock, Ireland (50°55′N 7°03′W) by SM U-59 (Imperial German Navy). Her crew survived.
Zealandia	United States	The ship ran aground off Southport, Lancashire, United Kingdom.

== 3 April ==
List of shipwrecks: 3 April 1917
Ship	State	Description
Annunziata A.	Italy	World War I: The brigantine was scuttled in the Mediterranean Sea east of Sardinia (39°52′N 10°04′E) by SM UC-38 (Imperial German Navy).
Ardgask	United Kingdom	World War I: The cargo ship was torpedoed and sunk in the Mediterranean Sea 15 nautical miles (28 km) south west of Cape Rosello, Sicily by SM U-35 (Imperial German Navy) with the loss of a crew member.
Caterina R.	Italy	World War I: The barquentine was scuttled in the Mediterranean Sea east of Sicily (39°27′N 9°46′E) by SM UC-38 (Imperial German Navy).
Domenico	Italy	World War I: The sailing vessel was scuttled in the Mediterranean Sea east of Sardinia (39°24′N 9°55′E) by SM UC-38 (Imperial German Navy).
Ellen James	United Kingdom	World War I: The schooner was shelled and sunk in the Atlantic Ocean west of Ouessant, Finistère, France by SM UC-71 (Imperial German Navy) with the loss of five of her crew.
Ernest Simons	France	World War I: The passenger ship was sunk in the Mediterranean Sea north east of Cap Sera, Algeria (37°08′N 8°28′E) by SM UC-37 (Imperial German Navy). Her crew survived.
Hesperus	Russia	World War I: The cargo ship was sunk in the Atlantic Ocean 72 nautical miles (133 km) off the Bishop Rock, Isles of Scilly, United Kingdom (48°50′N 7°20′W) by SM U-46 (Imperial German Navy). Her crew survived.
Maria Ferrara	Italy	World War I: The sailing vessel was sunk in the Mediterranean Sea west of Sicily by SM U-65 (Imperial German Navy).
Nuova Maria di Porto Salvo	Italy	World War I: The sailing vessel was sunk in the Mediterranean Sea east of Sicily by SM UC-38 (Imperial German Navy).
Saint Simon	France	World War I: The cargo ship was torpedoed and sunk in the Mediterranean Sea 20 nautical miles (37 km) north west of La Galite, Tunisia (37°36′N 8°38′E) by SM UC-37 (Imperial German Navy).
Vasilefs Constantinos	Greece	World War I: The cargo ship was sunk in the Aegean Sea 45 nautical miles (83 km) south west of Akra Akritas by SM UB-43 (Imperial German Navy).

== 4 April ==
List of shipwrecks: 4 April 1917
Ship	State	Description
City of Paris	United Kingdom	World War I: The passenger ship was torpedoed and sunk in the Mediterranean Sea 46 nautical miles (85 km) south by east of Cap d'Antibes, Alpes-Maritimes, France (42°54′N 7°38′E) by SM UC-35 (Imperial German Navy) with the loss of 122 lives.
Domingo	Italy	World War I: The cargo ship was sunk in the Atlantic Ocean off Queenstown, County Cork, United Kingdom by SM U-60 (Imperial German Navy).
Gibraltar	United Kingdom	World War I: The trawler was scuttled in the North Sea 20 nautical miles (37 km) east north east of Rattray Head, Aberdeenshire by SM UB-35 (Imperial German Navy). Her crew survived.
Hundvaagø	Norway	World War I: The cargo ship was torpedoed and damaged in the Atlantic Ocean south west of Ireland. She was beached at Castletownbere, County Cork, Ireland on 16 April. Subsequently repaired and returned to service.
Hunstanton	United Kingdom	World War I: The cargo ship was torpedoed and sunk in the Atlantic Ocean 36 nautical miles (67 km) west of the Isles of Scilly (49°50′N 7°40′W) by SM UC-30 (Imperial German Navy). Her crew survived.
Maggie Ross	United Kingdom	World War I: The trawler was shelled and sunk in the North Sea 60 nautical miles (110 km) north east of Girdle Ness, Aberdeenshire by SM UB-35 (Imperial German Navy). Her crew survived.
Margit	United Kingdom	World War I: The collier was torpedoed and sunk in the Mediterranean Sea 80 nautical miles (150 km) south west of Cape Matapan, Greece (35°28′N 21°24′E) by SM U-63 (Imperial German Navy). Her crew survived.
Marguerite	United States	World War I: The four-masted schooner was captured and damaged in attempting to scuttle her with a torpedo or by scuttling charges in the Mediterranean Sea 35 nautical miles (65 km) south west of Sardinia by SM U-35 (Imperial German Navy). She sank the next day. Her crew was rescued by a French torpedo boat 46 hours later.
Missourian	United States	World War I: The cargo ship was shelled and sunk in the Tyrrhenian Sea off Porto Maurizio, Liguria, Italy by SM U-52 (Imperial German Navy). Her crew survived.
Monte Protedigo	Argentina	World War I: The barquentine was sunk in the Atlantic Ocean off the Isles of Scilly (49°27′N 6°44′W) by SM UC-30 (Imperial German Navy).
Parana	Brazil	World War I: The cargo ship was sunk in the English Channel off Barfleur, Manche, France by SM UB-32 (Imperial German Navy). Her crew survived.
Parkgate	United Kingdom	World War I: The cargo ship was scuttled in the Mediterranean Sea 80 nautical miles (150 km) north east of the Cap de Fer, Algeria (38°12′N 8°10′E) by SM U-35 (Imperial German Navy) with the loss of sixteen crew. Her captain was taken as a prisoner of war.
Penseiro	Italy	World War I: The cargo ship was scuttled in the Atlantic Ocean 40 nautical miles (74 km) west of the Isles of Scilly by SM UC-71 (Imperial German Navy). Her crew survived.
Ravenna	Italy	World War I: The passenger ship was sunk in the Tyrrhenian Sea 2 nautical miles (3.7 km) off Cape Mele, Liguria (44°00′N 8°28′E) by SM U-52 (Imperial German Navy).
San Giovanni Battiste	Italy	World War I: The sailing vessel was sunk in the Mediterranean Sea by SM UC-37 (Imperial German Navy).
Trevier	Belgium	World War I: The cargo ship was torpedoed, shelled and sunk in the North Sea off Scheveningen, South Holland, Netherlands (52°15′N 3°49′E) by SM UB-23 (Imperial German Navy).
Vladimir Reitz	Denmark	World War I: The cargo ship was sunk in the Atlantic Ocean 40 nautical miles (74 km) north west by north of Foula, Shetland Islands, United Kingdom by SM U-78 (Imperial German Navy) with the loss of two crew.

== 5 April ==
List of shipwrecks: 5 April 1917
Ship	State	Description
Amiral L'Hermite	France	World War I: The schooner was scuttled in the Atlantic Ocean 60 nautical miles (110 km) west north west of the Blasket Islands, County Kerry, United Kingdom by SM U-59 (Imperial German Navy).
Angel Marina	Italy	World War I: The sailing vessel was scuttled in the Ligurian Sea (43°16′N 7°10′E) by SM U-52 (Imperial German Navy).
Benheather	United Kingdom	World War I: The cargo ship was torpedoed and sunk in the Atlantic Ocean 110 nautical miles (200 km) west north west of the Fastnet Rock (51°20′N 12°30′W) by SM U-46 (Imperial German Navy). Her crew survived.
Bris	Denmark	World War I: The schooner was sunk in the Atlantic Ocean 20 nautical miles (37 km) north of the Butt of Lewis, Outer Hebrides, United Kingdom by SM U-78 (Imperial German Navy) with the loss of two of her crew.
Calliope	United Kingdom	World War I: The cargo ship was torpedoed and sunk in the Tyrrhenian Sea 35 nautical miles (65 km) south west of Ustica, Italy (38°22′N 11°25′E) by SM U-65 (Imperial German Navy) with the loss of six lives. Three survivors were taken as prisoners of war.
Canadian	United Kingdom	World War I: The passenger ship was torpedoed and sunk in the Atlantic Ocean 47 nautical miles (87 km) north west of the Fastnet Rock (51°36′N 10°48′W) by SM U-59 (Imperial German Navy) with the loss of a crew member.
Dicto	Norway	World War I: The cargo ship was sunk in the Atlantic Ocean south east of the Armen Rock by SM UB-39 (Imperial German Navy) with the loss of a crew member.
Dunkerquois	France	World War I: The schooner was sunk in the Atlantic Ocean 45 nautical miles (83 km) off the Blasket Islands by SM U-86 (Imperial German Navy).
Ebenezer	Denmark	World War I: The three-masted schooner was shelled and sunk in the Atlantic Ocean 10 nautical miles (19 km) south west of St. Kilda, United Kingdom (57°58′N 8°20′W) by SM U-57 (Imperial German Navy). Her crew survived.
Ernest Legouve	France	World War I: The barque was torpedoed and sunk in the English Channel 5 nautical miles (9.3 km) west by south of St. Catherine's Point, Isle of Wight, United Kingdom (50°30′N 1°26′W) by SM UB-32 (Imperial German Navy) with the loss of twenty of her 24 crew.
Gower Coast	United Kingdom	World War I: The coaster struck a mine placed by SM UC-71 (Imperial German Navy) and sank in the English Channel off Le Tréport, Seine-Inférieure, France with the loss of all fifteen crew.
Marie Celine	France	World War I: The schooner was sunk in the Atlantic Ocean south west of Ireland by SM U-86 (Imperial German Navy).
N. J. Fjord	Denmark	World War I: The cargo ship was scuttled in the North Sea 40 nautical miles (74 km) east north east of Coquet Island, Northumberland, United Kingdom. Her crew survived.
Roland	France	World War I: The sailing vessel was sunk in the Atlantic Ocean 80 nautical miles (150 km) west north west of the Blasket Islands by SM U-59 (Imperial German Navy).
San Fulgencio	Spain	World War I: The cargo ship was sunk in the Bay of Biscay off Sables d'Olonne, Vendée, France by SM UC-71 (Imperial German Navy).
Siberier	Belgium	World War I: The cargo ship was torpedoed and damaged in the Atlantic Ocean 40 nautical miles (74 km) west of the Fastnet Rock (52°18′N 11°40′W) by SM U-86 (Imperial German Navy). She was taken in tow but sank the next day.
Solstad	Norway	World War I: The cargo ship was sunk in the Ionian Sea northwest of Cythera, Greece (36°02′N 20°50′E) by SM U-63 (Imperial German Navy). Her crew survived.
Vilja	Norway	World War I: The cargo ship was torpedoed and sunk in the Atlantic Ocean 135 nautical miles (250 km) west of the Fastnet Rock (52°12′N 13°07′W) by SM U-55 (Imperial German Navy) with the loss of a crew member.

== 6 April ==
List of shipwrecks: 6 April 1917
Ship	State	Description
Cybele	France	World War I: The sailing vessel was sunk in the Mediterranean Sea of Cabo de Gata, Almeria, Spain by SM UC-25 (Imperial German Navy).
Henry Clay	United States	The schooner barge sank in 15 fathoms (90 ft; 27 m) of water 9 miles (14 km) west south west of the Montauk Point Light after springing a leak in a gale, a total loss. The crew was rescued by her tug Germantown (United States).
John H. Ryerson	United States	The barge went ashore on Kelsey Point near Duck Island, Connecticut. Refloated and returned to service.
Kongshaug	Norway	World War I: The coaster was captured and scuttled in the North Sea 45 nautical miles (83 km) north of Kinnaird Head, Aberdeenshire, United Kingdom by SM UB-35 (Imperial German Navy). Her crew were rescued by a Scottish fishing vessel.
La Tour d'Auvergne	France	World War I: The brig was shelled and set on fire in the Atlantic Ocean 15 nautical miles (28 km) south south east of the Longships Lighthouse by SM UB-39 (Imperial German Navy). She was towed to Mullion, Cornwall, United Kingdom but was declared a constructive total loss. Her crew survived.
Lord Kitchener	United Kingdom	World War I: The trawler was scuttled in the North Sea 45 nautical miles (83 km) north by east of Kinnaird Head by SM UB-35 (Imperial German Navy). Her crew survived.
Marion	Norway	World War I: The barque was shelled and sunk in the Atlantic Ocean (52°10′N 13°46′W) by SM U-60 (Imperial German Navy) with the loss of a crew member.
Narberth Castle	United Kingdom	World War I: The trawler was shelled and sunk in the North Sea 30 nautical miles (56 km) north north west of Dennis Head Old Beacon, North Ronaldsay, Orkney Islands by SM UC-27 (Imperial German Navy). Her crew survived.
Nestor	United Kingdom	World War I: The trawler was shelled and sunk in the North Sea 20 nautical miles (37 km) north west by north of North Ronaldsay by SM UC-27 (Imperial German Navy). Her crew survived.
Perce Neige	France	World War I: The schooner was sunk in the Atlantic Ocean off Lands End, Cornwall, United Kingdom by SM UB-39 (Imperial German Navy).
Powhatan	United Kingdom	World War I: The tanker was torpedoed and sunk in the Atlantic Ocean 25 nautical miles (46 km) north by west of North Rona (59°32′N 6°30′W) by SM U-66 (Imperial German Navy) with the loss of 36 crew. Her captain was taken as a prisoner of war.
Presto	United Kingdom	World War I: The cargo ship struck a mine placed by SM UC-40 (Imperial German Navy) and sank in the North Sea 4 nautical miles (7.4 km) east of Roker Point, Sunderland, County Durham (54°57′N 1°16′W) with the loss of six of her crew.
Rahmanich	Egypt	World War I: The ship was sunk in the Mediterranean Sea off the coast of Egypt by SM UC-34 (Imperial German Navy).
Recto	United Kingdom	World War I: The trawler was scuttled in the North Sea 45 nautical miles (83 km) north by east of Kinnaird Head by SM UB-35 (Imperial German Navy). Her crew survived.
Rosalind	United Kingdom	World War I: The tanker was torpedoed and sunk in the Atlantic Ocean 180 nautical miles (330 km) west north west of the Fastnet Rock (51°39′N 14°20′W) by SM U-86 (Imperial German Navy) with the loss of two of her crew.
Sand Flea	United States	The dredge sank in the harbor at Bridgeport, Connecticut.
Spithead	United Kingdom	World War I: The cargo ship was torpedoed and sunk in the Mediterranean Sea 12 nautical miles (22 km) north by west of the Damietta Lighthouse, Egypt (31°44′N 31°46′E) by SM UC-34 (Imperial German Navy) with the loss of a crew member.
HMT Strathrannoch	Royal Navy	World War I: The naval trawler struck a mine placed by SM UC-31 (Imperial German Navy) and sank in the North Sea off St. Abb's Head, Berwickshire (55°55′N 2°07′W) with the loss of all thirteen crew.
Tell City	United States	The steamer sank after being forced ashore at Little Hocking, Ohio.
Thelma	Norway	World War I: The cargo ship struck a mine and sank in the English Channel 4 nautical miles (7.4 km) south by west of the Owers Lightship (United Kingdom) by SM UC-65 (Imperial German Navy) with the loss of a crew member.
Vine Branch	United Kingdom	World War I: The cargo ship was torpedoed and sunk in the Atlantic Ocean south west of Ireland (49°45′N 14°08′W) by SM U-55 (Imperial German Navy) with the loss of all 44 crew.

== 7 April ==
List of shipwrecks: 7 April 1917
Ship	State	Description
Caminha	Portugal	World War I: The cargo ship was sunk in the Bay of Biscay (45°22′N 2°48′W) by gunfire from SM UC-71 (Imperial German Navy).
SMS Cormoran	Imperial German Navy	World War I: The merchant raider was scuttled at Guam with the loss of nine crew.
Edwin R. Hunt	United States	World War I: The schooner was shelled and sunk in the Mediterranean Sea 40 nautical miles (74 km) off Cabo de Gata, Almeria, Spain by SM UC-25 (Imperial German Navy). Her crew survived.
Emily S. Baymore	United States	The barge went on the rocks at Eastern Point, New London, Connecticut.
Fiskaa	Norway	World War I: The barque was sunk in the Atlantic Ocean 10 nautical miles (19 km) off St. Kilda, United Kingdom by SM U-46 (Imperial German Navy). Her crew survived.
HMS Jason	Royal Navy	World War I: The torpedo boat struck a mine placed by SM U-78 (Imperial German Navy) and sank off Coll, Inner Hebrides (56°35′45″N 6°28′15″W) with the loss of 25 crew.
SS Maplewood	United Kingdom	World War I: The cargo ship was torpedoed and sunk in the Mediterranean Sea 47 nautical miles (87 km) south west of Cape Sperone, Sardinia, Italy by SM U-35 (Imperial German Navy). Her crew survived.
Salmo	United Kingdom	World War I: The cargo ship was torpedoed and sunk in the Atlantic Ocean 210 nautical miles (390 km) north west of the Fastnet Rock (52°30′N 14°40′W) by SM U-60 (Imperial German Navy) with the loss of two crew.
Scow No. 35	United States	The scow sank in White Head Pass, Portland, Maine.
Seward	United States	World War I: The cargo ship was shelled, or torpedoed, and sunk, or captured and scuttled with explosives, depending on source, in the Mediterranean Sea 22 nautical miles (41 km) north east of Begur, Spain (42°42′N 3°41′E) by SM U-52 (Imperial German Navy). Her crew survived.
Trefusis	United Kingdom	World War I: The collier was scuttled in the Mediterranean Sea 30 nautical miles (56 km) south east of Cape Pula, Sardinia (38°38′N 9°25′E) by SM U-65 (Imperial German Navy). Her crew survived, but three survivors were taken as prisoners of war.

== 8 April ==
List of shipwrecks: 8 April 1917
Ship	State	Description
Alba	Italy	World War I: The cargo ship was sunk in the Mediterranean Sea 3 nautical miles (5.6 km) off Garraf, Spain (41°05′N 1°53′E) by SM U-52 (Imperial German Navy).
SMS G88	Imperial German Navy	World War I: The G85-class torpedo boat was torpedoed and sunk in the North Sea by a Royal Navy Coastal Motor Boat.
Geilan Bahri	United Kingdom	World War I: The sailing vessel was scuttled in the Mediterranean Sea 54 nautical miles (100 km) off Alexandria, Egypt by SM UC-34 (Imperial German Navy).
Livatho	Greece	World War I: The cargo ship was sunk in the Mediterranean Sea north west of Crete (36°24′N 20°56′E) by SM UB-47 (Imperial German Navy). Her crew survived.
Lucia	Italy	World War I: The sailing vessel was sunk in the Mediterranean Sea off Cape Pula, Sardinia by SM U-65 (Imperial German Navy).
Nestos	Greece	World War I: The cargo ship was sunk in the Mediterranean Sea 50 nautical miles (93 km) west south west of Sapientza (36°27′N 20°59′E) by SM UB-47 (Imperial German Navy).
Papa Gian Battista	Italy	World War I: The sailing vessel was sunk in the Mediterranean Sea off Cape Pula, Sardinia by SM U-65 (Imperial German Navy).
Petridge	United Kingdom	World War I: The cargo ship was torpedoed and sunk in the Atlantic Ocean 200 nautical miles (370 km) west north west of Ouessant, Finistère, France (48°14′N 10°10′W) by SM U-55 (Imperial German Navy). Her crew survived, but two of them were taken as prisoners of war.
Torrington	United Kingdom	World War I: The cargo ship was torpedoed and sunk in the Atlantic Ocean 150 nautical miles (280 km) south west of the Isles of Scilly by SM U-55 (Imperial German Navy) with the loss of 34 crew. Her captain was taken as a prisoner of war.
Umvoti	United Kingdom	World War I: The cargo ship was torpedoed and sunk in the Atlantic Ocean 200 nautical miles (370 km) west north west of Ouessant (48°48′N 10°15′W) by SM U-55 (Imperial German Navy) with the loss of four crew. Two survivors were taken as prisoners of war.

== 9 April ==
List of shipwrecks: 9 April 1917
Ship	State	Description
Avon	United Kingdom	World War I: The passenger ship struck a mine placed by SM UC-7 (Imperial German Navy) and sank in the Thames Estuary 2.5 nautical miles (4.6 km) south east by south of the Tongue Lightship (United Kingdom) (51°29′00″N 1°26′30″E) with the loss of two lives.
Cairnie	United Kingdom	The coaster dragged her anchors, collided with another vessel and sank. Her crew were rescued.
Concord	United States	The steamer went ashore on Hog Island, Massachusetts.
Esterel	France	World War I: The cargo ship was sunk in the Mediterranean Sea off Port-Vendres, Pyrénées-Orientales (42°39′N 3°30′E) by SM U-52 (Imperial German Navy).
Fremad I	Norway	World War I: The barque was sunk in the North Sea 200 nautical miles (370 km) off Lindesnes, Vest-Agder (58°47′N 0°52′E) by SM U-59 (Imperial German Navy). Her crew survived.
Ganslei	Russia	World War I: The cargo ship was sunk in Kola Bay (69°19′N 33°31′E) by SM U-75 (Imperial German Navy).
Kittiwake	United Kingdom	World War I: The cargo ship was torpedoed and sunk in the North Sea 25 nautical miles (46 km) north west of the Maas Lightship (Netherlands) (52°15′N 3°18′E) by SM UB-30 (Imperial German Navy) with the loss of seven crew.
HMT Ortho	Royal Navy	World War I: The naval trawler struck a mine placed by SM UC-14 (Imperial German Navy) and sank in the North Sea off Lowestoft, Suffolk (52°23′00″N 1°52′30″E) with the loss of a crew member.
Saint Maudez	France	World War I: The sailing vessel was sunk in the English Channel 10 nautical miles (19 km) north north west of Fécamp, Seine-Inférieure by SM UB-39 (Imperial German Navy).
Themistoclis	Greece	World War I: The cargo ship was sunk in the Atlantic Ocean 100 nautical miles (190 km) off Pointe Saint-Mathieu, Finistère, France by SM UC-71 (Imperial German Navy).
Valhall	Norway	World War I: The cargo ship was sunk in the Atlantic Ocean 30 nautical miles (56 km) north of the Pierres Noires, Finistère by SM UC-71 (Imperial German Navy). Her crew survived.

== 10 April ==
List of shipwrecks: 10 April 1917
Ship	State	Description
Abd Razid	Tunisia	World War I: The sailing vessel was sunk in the Mediterranean Sea off Tripoli, Libya by SM UC-20 (Imperial German Navy).
Dalton	United Kingdom	World War I: The cargo ship was torpedoed and sunk in the Mediterranean Sea off Cape Matapan, Greece (36°00′N 22°40′E) by SM U-28 (Austro-Hungarian Navy). Her crew survived.
HMS P26	Royal Navy	World War I: The P-class sloop struck a mine placed by SM UC-26 (Imperial German Navy) and sank in the English Channel off Le Havre, Seine-Inférieure, France with the loss of nineteen of her 59 crew. Survivors were rescued by HMS P19 (Royal Navy
Pluto	United Kingdom	World War I: The cargo ship was torpedoed and sunk in the North Sea 32 nautical miles (59 km) south east by east of Lowestoft, Suffolk (52°19′N 2°34′E) by SM UB-20 (Imperial German Navy). Her crew survived.
Porto di Rodi	Italy	World War I: The cargo ship was sunk in the Ionian Sea 37°53′N 18°02′E) SM U-32 (Imperial German Navy) with the loss of 31 crew.
Ranvik	Norway	World War I: The cargo ship was sunk in the Atlantic Ocean 45 nautical miles (83 km) west south west of Ouessant, Finistère, France by SM UC-71 (Imperial German Navy). Her crew survived.
HMHS Salta	Royal Navy	( Red Cross): World War I: The hospital ship struck a mine and sank at Le Havre with the loss of 130 of the 205 people on board.

== 11 April ==
List of shipwrecks: 11 April 1917
Ship	State	Description
HMT Amy	Royal Navy	World War I: The 125-foot (38 m), 223-ton steam minesweeping naval trawler struck a mine placed by SM UC-26 (Imperial German Navy) and sank in the English Channel off Le Havre, Seine Maritime, France with the loss of nine of her 10 crew.
Ansgar	Denmark	World War I: The barquentine was set afire and sunk in the Mediterranean Sea off Cape San Antonio, Spain (39°06′N 0°30′E) by SM U-52 (Imperial German Navy). Her crew survived.
Candia	Italy	World War I: The cargo ship was sunk in the Mediterranean Sea off Zuwara, Libya by SM UC-20 (Imperial German Navy).
Cyfarthfa	United Kingdom	World War I: The cargo ship was torpedoed and sunk in the Mediterranean Sea 32 nautical miles (59 km) west south west of Antikythera, Greece (35°29′N 22°30′E) by SM UB-47 (Imperial German Navy). Her crew survived.
Duchess of Cornwall	United Kingdom	World War I: The cargo ship struck a mine placed by SM UC-26 (Imperial German Navy) and sank in the English Channel 5 nautical miles (9.3 km) north of Cape Barfleur, Manche, France with the loss of 23 of her crew.
Imperial Transport	United Kingdom	World War I: The cargo ship was torpedoed and sunk in the Mediterranean Sea 140 nautical miles (260 km) north west by north of Alexandria, Egypt by SM UC-34 (Imperial German Navy). Her crew survived, but her captain was taken as a prisoner of war.
Miss Morris	United Kingdom	World War I: The three-masted schooner was scuttled in the Mediterranean Sea 20 nautical miles (37 km) south east of Garrucha, Andalusia, Spain (36°57′N 1°50′W) by SM U-35 (Imperial German Navy). Her crew survived.
Nancy	Denmark	World War I: The cargo ship was torpedoed and sunk in the North Sea 42 nautical miles (78 km) off the Hellisøy Lighthouse, Hordaland, Norway by SM U-30 (Imperial German Navy) with the loss of three crew.
Precedent	United Kingdom	World War I: The fishing smack was scuttled in the English Channel 12 nautical miles (22 km) east south east of Berry Head, Devon by SM UB-38 (Imperial German Navy). Her crew survived.
Quaggy	United Kingdom	World War I: The coaster struck a mine placed by SM UC-31 (Imperial German Navy) and sank in the North Sea 3 nautical miles (5.6 km) east of Robin Hood's Bay, Yorkshire with the loss of two of her crew.
Sarvsfos	Norway	World War I: The barque was sunk in the North Sea 80 nautical miles (150 km) south east of Kirkwall, Orkney Islands (58°33′N 0°00′E) by SM U-50 (Imperial German Navy). Her crew survived.
Saxo	Denmark	World War I: The coaster was sunk in the North Sea 42 nautical miles (78 km) off the Hellisøy Lighthouse by SM U-30 (Imperial German Navy). Her crew survived.
Star	Norway	World War I: The coaster was sunk in the North Sea 68 nautical miles (126 km) off the coast of Fife, United Kingdom by SM U-30 (Imperial German Navy). Her crew survived.
Sylfiden	Norway	World War I: The barque was sunk in the North Sea NW. of Bergen 50 nautical miles (93 km) north by west of Holmengråa Island, Vestland by SM U-30 (Imperial German Navy). Her crew survived.
HMS Thrush	Royal Navy	The salvage ship was wrecked off Glenarm, Ireland.
Tremorvah	United Kingdom	World War I: The cargo ship was shelled and sunk in the Mediterranean Sea 70 nautical miles (130 km) north north west of Cape Bougaroni, Algeria by SM U-65 (Imperial German Navy). Her crew survived, but four of them were taken as prisoners of war.

== 12 April ==
List of shipwrecks: 12 April 1917
Ship	State	Description
Angela M.	Italy	World War I: The three-masted schooner was scuttled in the Mediterranean Sea north west of Cape Bougaroni, Algeria by SM U-65 (Imperial German Navy).
Caliban	United Kingdom	World War I: The trawler was shelled and sunk in the North Sea 45 nautical miles (83 km) north east by east of Rattray Head, Aberdeenshire by SM UC-76 (Imperial German Navy). Her crew survived.
Chinkiang	United Kingdom	World War I: The trawler was shelled and sunk in the North Sea 30 nautical miles (56 km) north east by east of Buchan Ness, Aberdeenshire by SM UC-76 (Imperial German Navy). Her crew survived.
Crown Prince	United Kingdom	World War I: The trawler was shelled and sunk in the North Sea 45 nautical miles (83 km) north east by east of Girdle Ness by SM UC-76 (Imperial German Navy). Her crew survived.
Dina Henderika	Netherlands	World War I: The sailing vessel was scuttled in the North Sea 30 nautical miles (56 km) east north east of Hartlepool, County Durham, United Kingdom by SM UC-31 (Imperial German Navy).
Edelweiss	France	World War I: The sailing vessel was shelled and sunk in the English Channel off Cherbourg, Seine-Inférieure by SM UC-71 (Imperial German Navy).
Equerry	United Kingdom	World War I: The trawler was shelled and sunk in the North Sea 35 nautical miles (65 km) north east of Kincaid Head by SM UC-76 (Imperial German Navy). Her crew survived.
Ernst Sophie	Russia	World War I: The sailing vessel was scuttled in the Atlantic Ocean south west of Ireland (51°05′N 11°58′W) by SM UC-27 (Imperial German Navy).
Fife Ness	United Kingdom	World War I: The fishing vessel was shelled and sunk in the North Sea 23 nautical miles (43 km) east north east of Fraserburgh, Aberdeenshire by SM UC-76 (Imperial German Navy). Her crew survived.
Glencliffe	United Kingdom	World War I: The cargo ship was torpedoed and sunk in the Mediterranean Sea 2.5 nautical miles (4.6 km) off Tabarca Island, Alicante, Spain (38°07′N 0°22′W) by SM U-52 (Imperial German Navy) with the loss of a crew member. Three survivors were taken as prisoners of war.
India	Greece	World War I: The cargo ship was sunk in the Mediterranean Sea east of Gibraltar by SM U-35 (Imperial German Navy).
Kildale	United Kingdom	World War I: The cargo ship was torpedoed and sunk in the Mediterranean Sea 40 nautical miles (74 km) east of Pantelleria, Italy (36°44′N 12°32′E) SM U-32 (Imperial German Navy) with the loss of a crew member.
Kolaastind	Norway	World War I: The cargo ship was sunk in the North Sea (60°14′N 2°42′E) by SM U-30 (Imperial German Navy) with the loss of four crew.
Largo Bay	United Kingdom	World War I: The trawler was shelled and sunk in the North Sea 30 nautical miles (56 km) north east by east of Buchan Ness by SM UC-76 (Imperial German Navy). Her crew survived.
Lilian	United Kingdom	World War I: The trawler was shelled and sunk in the North Sea 45 nautical miles (83 km) north east by east of Girdle Ness by SM UC-76 (Imperial German Navy). Her crew survived.
Lismore	United Kingdom	World War I: The passenger ship was torpedoed and sunk in the English Channel 22 nautical miles (41 km) north west by north of Le Havre, Seine-Inférieure, France (49°48′N 0°18′W) by SM UB-38 (Imperial German Navy) with the loss of five lives.
Neptunus	Netherlands	World War I: The sailing vessel was sunk in the North Sea 20 nautical miles (37 km) east north east of Hartlepool by SM UC-31 (Imperial German Navy).
Niritos	Greece	World War I: The cargo ship was sunk in the Mediterranean Sea 5 nautical miles (9.3 km) off Augusta, Sicily, Italy (37°13′N 15°20′E) by SM U-27 (Austro-Hungarian Navy).
Osprey	United Kingdom	World War I: The trawler was shelled and sunk in the North Sea 45 nautical miles (83 km) north east by east of Girdle Ness by SM UC-76 (Imperial German Navy). Her crew survived.
Toro	United Kingdom	World War I: The cargo ship was torpedoed and sunk in the Atlantic Ocean 200 nautical miles (370 km) west north west of Ouessant, Finistère, France (48°30′N 10°00′W) by SM U-55 (Imperial German Navy) with the loss of fourteen crew. Two survivors were taken as prisoners of war.
Union	Denmark	World War I: The schooner was sunk in the North Sea 18 to 20 nautical miles (33 to 37 km) east of the Souter Lighthouse, County Durham by SM UC-31 (Imperial German Navy). Her crew survived.
Voorwarts	Netherlands	World War I: The schooner was sunk in the North Sea 20 nautical miles (37 km) east north east of Hartlepool by SM UC-31 (Imperial German Navy).

== 13 April ==
List of shipwrecks: 13 April 1917
Ship	State	Description
Argyll	United Kingdom	World War I: The cargo ship was torpedoed and sunk in the Atlantic Ocean 110 nautical miles (200 km) west of the Bishop Rock, Isles of Scilly (49°23′N 9°07′W) by SM U-84 (Imperial German Navy) with the loss of 22 of her crew.
Bandon	United Kingdom	World War I: The cargo ship struck a mine placed by SM UC-44 (Imperial German Navy) and sank in the Atlantic Ocean 2.5 nautical miles (4.6 km) south west of Mine Head, Waterford (51°57′N 7°35′W) with the loss of 28 of her crew.
Bokn	Norway	World War I: The coaster was sunk in the North Sea 95 nautical miles (176 km) off the Hellisøy Lighthouse, Hordaland (60°04′N 0°45′E) by SM U-30 (Imperial German Navy). Her crew survived.
Frixos	Russian Empire	World War I: The cargo ship was torpedoed and sunk in the North Sea 60 nautical miles (110 km) east of the Shetland Islands, United Kingdom (60°04′N 0°45′E) by SM U-30 (Imperial German Navy).
Gama	Norway	World War I: The coaster was sunk in the North Sea (60°24′N 1°15′E) by SM U-30 (Imperial German Navy). Her crew survived.
Gambetta	France	World War I: The sailing vessel was sunk in the Bay of Biscay off the Île d'Yeu, Finistère by SM UC-26 (Imperial German Navy).
Giuseppe Accame	Italy	World War I: The cargo ship was sunk in the Mediterranean Sea 40 nautical miles (74 km) west of Cape Spartel, Morocco by SM U-35 (Imperial German Navy).
Glenlora	Norway	World War I: The barque was sunk in the North Sea (60°36′N 1°53′E) by SM U-30 (Imperial German Navy). Her crew survived.
Kariba	United Kingdom	World War I: The cargo ship was torpedoed and sunk in the Atlantic Ocean 260 nautical miles (480 km) west north west of Ouessant, Finistère, France (48°30′N 11°28′W) by SM UC-27 (Imperial German Navy) with the loss of thirteen of her crew.
Maggie Todd	United States	The schooner went ashore at Wood End, Provincetown, Massachusetts. Refloated and returned to service.
Maria	United Kingdom	World War I: The schooner was scuttled in the English Channel 25 nautical miles (46 km) south west of Portland Bill, Dorset by SM UB-38 (Imperial German Navy). Her crew survived.
HMML 534	Royal Navy	The motor launch was lost in the Mediterranean Sea on this date.
Odysseus	Greece	World War I: The cargo ship was sunk in the Mediterranean Sea 30 nautical miles (56 km) west of Cape Spartel by SM U-35 (Imperial German Navy).
HMT Pitstruan	Royal Navy	World War I: The naval trawler struck a mine placed by SM UC-76 (Imperial German Navy) and sank in the North Sea 3 nautical miles (5.6 km) south east of the Noss Head Lighthouse, Shetland Islands with the loss of eleven of her crew.
Stork	United Kingdom	World War I: The trawler was scuttled in the North Sea 20 nautical miles (37 km) east of St Abb's Head, Berwickshire by SM UC-41 (Imperial German Navy). Her crew survived.
Strathcona	Canada	World War I: The cargo ship was scuttled in the Atlantic Ocean 145 nautical miles (269 km) west north west of North Ronaldsay, Orkney Islands, United Kingdom (59°35′N 5°49′W) by SM U-78 (Imperial German Navy) with the loss of nine crew. Three survivors were taken as prisoners of war.
Stromboli	Italy	World War I: The cargo ship was sunk in the Mediterranean Sea 50 nautical miles (93 km) west of Cape Spartel by SM U-35 (Imperial German Navy).
W. F. Babcock	United States	The schooner barge went ashore on Monomoy Point, Massachusetts. Refloated and returned to service.
Zara	United Kingdom	World War I: The cargo ship was torpedoed and sunk in the North Sea 90 nautical miles (170 km) off the Hellisøy Lighthouse (60°08′N 1°52′E) by SM U-30 (Imperial German Navy) with the loss of 27 lives.

== 14 April ==
List of shipwrecks: 14 April 1917
Ship	State	Description
Andromach	United Kingdom	World War I: The trawler was scuttled in the Atlantic Ocean west of the Shetland Islands by SM U-78 (Imperial German Navy). Her captain was taken as a prisoner of war. The other eleven crew took to the lifeboat but were not found.
Cinque Ottobre	Italy	World War I: The sailing vessel was sunk in the Mediterranean Sea off the coast of Tunisia by SM UC-20 (Imperial German Navy).
Fjeldli	Norway	World War I: The coaster was sunk in the North Sea 76 nautical miles (141 km) west by north of the Marstein Lighthouse, Hordaland (60°02′N 2°10′E) by SM U-30 (Imperial German Navy). Her crew survived.
Gange	French Navy	World War I: The troopship struck a mine and sank in the Mediterranean Sea 33 nautical miles (61 km) north east of Cape Serrat, Algeria (37°24′N 9°50′E) by SM UC-37 (Imperial German Navy) with the loss of one life.
Hermione	United Kingdom	World War I: The cargo ship struck a mine placed by SM UC-33 (Imperial German Navy) and was damaged in the Irish Sea off the Coningbeg Lightship (United Kingdom). She was beached in Dunmore Bay where she was declared a constructive total loss. Subsequently scrapped in situ.
HMT Orcades	Royal Navy	World War I: The naval trawler struck a mine placed by SM UC-7 (Imperial German Navy) and sank in the North Sea off Grimsby with the loss of six of her crew.
Patagonier	United Kingdom	World War I: The cargo ship was shelled and sunk in the Mediterranean Sea 135 nautical miles (250 km)) west of Gibraltar (36°00′N 9°00′W) by SM U-35 (Imperial German Navy). Her crew survived.
Progresso	Italy	World War I: The tug was sunk in the Mediterranean Sea off the coast of Tunisia by SM UC-20 (Imperial German Navy).
Spray	United Kingdom	World War I: The cargo ship was sunk in the North Sea 3.5 nautical miles (6.5 km) north east of the mouth of the River Tyne by SM UC-30 (Imperial German Navy). Her crew survived.
Tom	Spain	World War I: The cargo ship was sunk in the Bay of Biscay 12 nautical miles (22 km) off Hourtin, Gironde, France (45°05′N 1°30′W) by SM UC-26 (Imperial German Navy). Her crew survived.
Tres Macs	Portugal	World War I: The auxiliary sailing vessel was shelled and sunk in the Mediterranean Sea (36°39′N 7°22′W) by SM U-52 (Imperial German Navy).
Venus	Norway	World War I: The coaster struck a mine placed by SM UC-50 (Imperial German Navy) and sank in the North Sea 5 nautical miles (9.3 km) off Berwick-upon-Tweed, Northumberland, United Kingdom with the loss of fourteen of her crew.

== 15 April ==
List of shipwrecks: 15 April 1917
Ship	State	Description
A-5	United States Navy	Sunk at Cavite Navy Yard in the Philippines due to a ballast tank leak. Raised and returned to service.
Alert	United Kingdom	World War I: The coaster struck a mine and sank in the English Channel off Dover, Kent.
Alessio Cocco	Italy	World War I: The sailing vessel was sunk in the Mediterranean Sea off the coast of Tunisia by SM UC-20 (Imperial German Navy).
Arcadian	United Kingdom	SS Arcadian World War I: The troopship was torpedoed and sunk in the Sea of Crete 26 nautical miles (48 km) northeast of Milos, Greece (36°50′N 24°50′E) by SM UC-74 (Imperial German Navy) with the loss of 277 lives.
Astræa	Denmark	World War I: The barquentine was set afire and sunk in the Atlantic Ocean south west of the Isles of Scilly, United Kingdom (49°00′N 10°30′W) by SM U-55 (Imperial German Navy) with the loss of seven crew.
Brothertoft	United Kingdom	World War I: The trawler was sunk in the North Sea (approximately 55°50′N 1°30′E) by SM UC-30 (Imperial German Navy).
Cameronia	United Kingdom	World War I: The troopship was torpedoed and sunk in the Mediterranean Sea 150 nautical miles (280 km) east of Malta (35°50′N 17°32′E) by SM U-33 (Imperial German Navy) with the loss of 140-210 of the 2,650-plus people on board. Survivors were rescued by HMS Nemesis and HMS Rifleman (both Royal Navy).
Dalmatian	United Kingdom	World War I: The trawler was scuttled in the North Sea by SM UC-44 (Imperial German Navy). Her nine crew took to the lifeboats but did not survive.
Fram	Denmark	World War I: The schooner was shelled and sunk in the North Sea (56°35′N 2°45′W) by SM U-93 (Imperial German Navy).
Gretaston	United Kingdom	World War I: The cargo ship was torpedoed and sunk in the Atlantic Ocean (43°08′N 11°32′W) by SM UC-27 (Imperial German Navy) with the loss of all 29 crew.
Heikina	Netherlands	World War I: The sailing vessel was sunk in the North Sea by SM UC-44 (Imperial German Navy). Her crew took to the lifeboats but did not survive.
Mashobra	United Kingdom	World War I: The passenger ship was torpedoed and sunk in the Mediterranean Sea 140 nautical miles (260 km) south west of Cape Matapan, Greece (35°34′N 20°40′E) by SM U-28 (Austro-Hungarian Navy) with the loss of eight lives. Her captain was taken as a prisoner of war.
Møhlenpris	Norway	World War I: The coaster was sunk in the English Channel 15 nautical miles (28 km) south west of Beachy Head, Sussex, United Kingdom (50°38′N 0°15′W) by SM UB-40 (Imperial German Navy). Her crew survived.
Panaghi Drakatos	Greece	World War I: The cargo ship was sunk in the Atlantic Ocean 26 nautical miles (48 km) off Cape Santa Maria, Portugal by SM U-35 (Imperial German Navy). Her crew survived.
Paris	Norway	World War I: The cargo ship was sunk in the North Sea 100 nautical miles (190 km) west of Greipengen by SM U-30 (Imperial German Navy). Her crew survived.
Sutterton	United Kingdom	World War I: The trawler was scuttled in the North Sea 65 nautical miles (120 km) east south east of St Abb's Head, Berwickshire (55°45′N 0°15′W) by SM UC-44 (Imperial German Navy) with the loss of a crew member.
Tusnastabb	Norway	World War I: The coaster struck a mine and sank in the English Channel off Cap Gris Nez, Pas-de-Calais, France (50°54′N 1°34′E). Her crew survived.

== 16 April ==
List of shipwrecks: 16 April 1917
Ship	State	Description
Amanda	Sweden	World War I: The brig was scuttled in the North Sea (56°27′N 3°00′E) by SM UC-51 (Imperial German Navy). Her crew survived.
Anne	Denmark	World War I: The three-masted schooner was scuttled in the Atlantic Ocean west of Ireland (51°45′N 17°20′W) by SM U-43 (Imperial German Navy). Her crew survived.
HMS C16	Royal Navy	The C-class submarine was rammed and sunk at Harwich, Essex by HMS Melampus (Royal Navy) with the loss of all sixteen crew. She was subsequently salvaged, repaired and returned to service.
Cairndhu	United Kingdom	World War I: The cargo ship was torpedoed and sunk in the English Channel 25 nautical miles (46 km) west of Beachy Head, Sussex by SM UB-40 (Imperial German Navy) with the loss of eleven of her crew.
Crios	Greece	World War I: The cargo ship was scuttled in the Atlantic Ocean off Cape Espichel, Portugal (38°20′N 9°12′W) by SM U-52 (Imperial German Navy).
Eduard	United Kingdom	World War I: The three-masted schooner was scuttled in the English Channel 12 nautical miles (22 km) south west of Beachy Head (50°34′N 0°05′E) by SM UC-70 (Imperial German Navy). Her crew survived.
Endymion	Russia	World War I: The sailing vessel was scuttled in the Atlantic Ocean 250 nautical miles (460 km) west of Galway, United Kingdom (52°30′N 16°20′W) by SM U-43 (Imperial German Navy).
Lord Chancellor	United Kingdom	World War I: The trawler was scuttled in the North Sea 50 nautical miles (93 km) north east of the Longstone Lighthouse, Northumberland by SM UC-41 (Imperial German Navy). Her crew survived.
Marden	United Kingdom	World War I: The coaster was shelled and sunk in the English Channel 6 nautical miles (11 km) north west of Cap Gris Nez, Pas-de-Calais, France by SM UB-36 (Imperial German Navy) with the loss of a crew member.
Polycarp	Norway	World War I: The sailing vessel was sunk in the North Sea (56°23′N 2°52′E) by SM UC-51 (Imperial German Navy). Her crew survived.
Queen Mary	United Kingdom	World War I: The cargo ship was torpedoed and sunk in the Atlantic Ocean 180 nautical miles (330 km) north west by north of the Fastnet Rock (51°48′N 14°52′W) by SM U-60 (Imperial German Navy) with the loss of nine crew.
Rochester Castle	United Kingdom	World War I: The ketch was shelled and sunk in the English Channel 5 nautical miles (9.3 km) west south west of Cap Gris Nez by SM UB-36 (Imperial German Navy). Her crew survived.
Rosetta	Egypt	World War I: The sailing vessel was sunk in the Mediterranean Sea off Gaza by SM UB-42 (Imperial German Navy).
Sagres	Portugal	World War I: The cargo ship struck a mine and sank in the Mediterranean Sea off Cap Blanc, Tunisia.
Sea Products Co. No. 1	United States	The barge sank in a storm with high winds and high seas off the coast of California half way between Point Dume and San Pedro, California, a total loss.
Smeul	Royal Romanian Navy	World War I: The Nǎluca-class torpedo boat was sunk by Ottoman mines laid by the cruiser Midilli (Ottoman Navy) in the Danube River Estuary.
Sontay	France	World War I: The passenger ship was sunk in the Mediterranean Sea 100 nautical miles (190 km) south east of Malta (35°02′N 16°28′E) by SM U-33 (Imperial German Navy). Her crew survived.
Towergate	United Kingdom	World War I: The cargo ship was torpedoed and sunk in the Atlantic Ocean 250 nautical miles (460 km) north west by west of the Fastnet Rock (52°10′N 16°16′W) by SM U-43 (Imperial German Navy). Her crew survived.
Victoria	United Kingdom	World War I: The three-masted schooner was scuttled in the English Channel 30 nautical miles (56 km) south west of Beachy Head by SM UB-40 (Imperial German Navy). Her crew survived.

== 17 April ==
List of shipwrecks: 17 April 1917
Ship	State	Description
Aburi	United Kingdom	World War I: The Elder Dempster 3,730 GRT cargo liner was torpedoed and sunk in the Atlantic Ocean 125 nautical miles (232 km) north west of Tory Island, County Donegal (56°15′N 11°30′W) by SM U-61 (Imperial German Navy) with the loss of 25 crew.
Bretagne	Denmark	World War I: The cargo ship was sunk in the North Sea 8 to 9 nautical miles (15 to 17 km) off Rattray Head, Aberdeenshire, United Kingdom (57°43′N 1°42′W) by SM UC-45 (Imperial German Navy). Her crew survived.
Brisbane River	United Kingdom	World War I: The cargo ship was scuttled in the Atlantic Ocean 140 nautical miles (260 km) west of Gibraltar (35°30′N 8°10′W) by SM U-35 (Imperial German Navy). Her crew survived, but her captain was taken as a prisoner of war.
Cairnhill	United Kingdom	World War I: The cargo ship was scuttled in the Atlantic Ocean 160 nautical miles (300 km) south west of the Fastnet Rock (52°09′N 13°16′W) by SM U-55 (Imperial German Navy). Her crew survived, but her captain was taken as a prisoner of war.
Charles Goodanew	United Kingdom	World War I: The coaster was sunk in the North Sea 3.5 nautical miles (6.5 km) north north east of Rattray Head (57°39′N 1°45′W) by SM UC-45 (Imperial German Navy) with the loss of thirteen of her crew.
Corfu	United Kingdom	World War I: The cargo ship was scuttled in the Atlantic Ocean 160 nautical miles (300 km) west of Gibraltar (35°14′N 8°25′W) by SM U-35 (Imperial German Navy) with the loss of three crew.
Costante	Italy	World War I: The cargo ship was sunk in the Mediterranean Sea off the coast of Algeria (36°53′N 4°15′E) by SM U-32 (Imperial German Navy).
Dantzic	United Kingdom	World War I: The schooner was scuttled in the Irish Sea 30 nautical miles (56 km) south by west of St. Ann's Head, Pembrokeshire by SM UC-47 (Imperial German Navy). Her crew survived.
Donegal	United Kingdom	: World War I: The hospital ship was torpedoed and sunk in the English Channel 19 nautical miles (35 km) south of the Dean Lightship (United Kingdom) (50°26′N 1°00′W) by SM UC-21 (Imperial German Navy) with the loss of 40 lives.
Fernmoor	United Kingdom	World War I: The cargo ship was scuttled in the Atlantic Ocean 150 nautical miles (280 km) west of Gibraltar (35°30′N 8°18′W) by SM U-35 (Imperial German Navy). Her crew survived.
Kish	United Kingdom	World War I: The cargo ship was torpedoed and sunk in the Atlantic Ocean 160 nautical miles (300 km) north west by west of the Fastnet Rock by SM U-67 (Imperial German Navy) with the loss of six crew.
HMHS Lanfranc	Royal Navy	World War I: The hospital ship was torpedoed and sunk in the English Channel 42 nautical miles (78 km) north of Le Havre, Seine-Inférieure, France (50°11′N 0°12′E) by SM UB-40 (Imperial German Navy) with the loss of 40 lives.
Robert	Denmark	World War I: The cargo ship was torpedoed and sunk in the North Sea 14 nautical miles (26 km) east of Fair Isle, United Kingdom by SM UC-76 (Imperial German Navy) with the loss of eight crew.
U.S.A.	United Kingdom	World War I: The fishing vessel was scuttled in the North Sea 16 nautical miles (30 km) east north east of the Longstone Lighthouse, Northumberland (55°54′N 1°06′W) by SM UC-41 (Imperial German Navy). Her crew survived.
William Shephard	United Kingdom	World War I: The three-masted schooner was scuttled in the Irish Sea 30 nautical miles (56 km) south by west of St. Ann's Head by SM UC-47 (Imperial German Navy). Her crew survived.

== 18 April ==
List of shipwrecks: 18 April 1917
Ship	State	Description
Atalanta	Sweden	World War I: The cargo ship was sunk in the North Sea with the loss of all but one crew – 16 dead. The U-boat was SM U-86 (Imperial German Navy).
Bergensgut	Norway	World War I: The cargo ship was sunk in the North Sea 60 nautical miles (110 km) east of Peterhead, Aberdeenshire, United Kingdom by SM UC-76 (Imperial German Navy) with the loss of ten of her crew.
Castilian	United Kingdom	World War I: The cargo ship was torpedoed and sunk in the Atlantic Ocean 110 nautical miles (200 km) north west by north of Tory Island, County Donegal (56°20′N 10°45′W) by SM U-61 (Imperial German Navy) with the loss of ten crew.
Cragoswald	United Kingdom	World War I: The cargo ship was torpedoed and sunk in the Atlantic Ocean 60 nautical miles (110 km) west by south of the Bishop Rock, Isles of Scilly by SM U-84 (Imperial German Navy). with the loss of two of her crew.
Heim	Norway	World War I: The cargo ship struck a mine and sank in the English Channel 10 nautical miles (19 km) north of Pointe d'Ailly, Seine-Inférieure, France with the loss of two of her crew. by SM UC-71 (Imperial German Navy).
John S. Boyle	United Kingdom	World War I: The fishing vessel was scuttled in the North Sea 25 nautical miles (46 km) east by south of St Abb's Head, Berwickshire (56°16′N 1°33′W) by SM UC-41 (Imperial German Navy). Her crew survived.
Louisiana	Denmark	World War I: The cargo ship was torpedoed and sunk in the North Sea 20 nautical miles (37 km)) north north east of Buchan Ness, (57°47′N 1°22′W) by SM UC-45 (Imperial German Navy). Her crew survived.
Marcel	Belgium	World War I: The tug was scuttled in the North Sea 8 nautical miles (15 km) north east of the Noord Hinder Lightship (Netherlands) by SM UB-23 (Imperial German Navy).
Rameses	United Kingdom	World War I: The trawler was scuttled in the North Sea 45 nautical miles (83 km) east of St Abb's Head (56°14′N 1°29′W) by SM UC-41 (Imperial German Navy). Her crew survived.
Rhydwen	United Kingdom	World War I: the cargo ship was torpedoed and sunk in the Atlantic Ocean 170 nautical miles (310 km) north west by west of the Fastnet Rock (51°40′N 14°00′W) by SM U-67 (Imperial German Navy) with the loss of six crew.
Rinaldo	United Kingdom	World War I: The cargo ship was torpedoed and sunk in the Mediterranean Sea 18 nautical miles (33 km) west by north of Cape Cherchell, Algeria (36°35′N 1°48′E) by SM U-32 (Imperial German Navy). Her crew survived.
Rowena	United Kingdom	World War I: The cargo ship was torpedoed and sunk in the Atlantic Ocean 95 nautical miles (176 km) west by south of the Bishop Rock (49°03′N 8°25′W) by SM U-84 (Imperial German Navy) with the loss of a crew member.
Scalpa	United Kingdom	World War I: The cargo ship was torpedoed and sunk in the Atlantic Ocean 150 nautical miles (280 km) north west by west of the Fastnet Rock by SM U-53 (Imperial German Navy). Her crew survived.
Sculptor	United Kingdom	World War I: The cargo ship was torpedoed and sunk in the Atlantic Ocean 120 nautical miles (220 km) north west by west of the Fastnet Rock (51°56′N 12°50′W) by SM U-53 (Imperial German Navy) with the loss of a crew member.
Surcouf	France	World War I: The sailing vessel was sunk in the English Channel off Île Vierge, Finistère by SM UC-26 (Imperial German Navy). Her crew survived.
Thistle	United States	During a voyage from Seattle, Washington, to Nushagak, Territory of Alaska, the 102-gross register ton, 90.5-foot (27.6 m) steam fishing vessel ran aground in the Gulf of Georgia on Pender Island in the southern Gulf Islands in British Columbia, Canada. When the tide turned, she floated free, but then sank due to the damage she suffered in the grounding. All 14 people on board survived and were rescued by the steamer Admiral Farragut (United States).
Thomas	United Kingdom	World War I: The schooner was scuttled in the Atlantic Ocean 40 nautical miles (74 km) off Cape St. Vincent, Portugal by SM UC-27 (Imperial German Navy). Her crew survived.
Trekieve	United Kingdom	World War I: The cargo ship was torpedoed and sunk in the Atlantic Ocean 100 nautical miles (190 km) west of Gibraltar (35°00′N 9°45′W) by SM U-35 (Imperial German Navy) with the loss of three crew.
Troldfos	Norway	World War I: The cargo ship was sunk in the Atlantic Ocean 50 nautical miles (93 km) west north west of the Shetland Islands, United Kingdom by SM U-93 (Imperial German Navy). Her crew survived.
West Lothian	Norway	World War I: The four-masted barque was torpedoed and sunk in the Atlantic Ocean 50 nautical miles (93 km) west of the Shetland Islands (60°55′N 3°30′W) by SM U-93 (Imperial German Navy). Her crew survived.
Witham	United Kingdom	World War I: The trawler was shelled and sunk in the North Sea 125 nautical miles (232 km) east by south of St Abb's Head (55°56′N 1°36′E) by SM UC-50 (Imperial German Navy). Her crew survived.

== 19 April ==
List of shipwrecks: 19 April 1917
Ship	State	Description
Avocet	United Kingdom	World War I: The cargo ship was torpedoed and sunk in the Atlantic Ocean 100 nautical miles (190 km) west north west of the Fastnet Rock (51°19′N 12°30′W) by SM U-50 (Imperial German Navy). Her crew survived.
Bethlehem	United Kingdom	World War I: The auxiliary sailing vessel struck a mine and sank in the North Sea with the loss of a crew member.
Cilurnum	United Kingdom	World War I: The cargo ship was torpedoed and sunk in the Bay of Biscay 5 nautical miles (9.3 km) south west of Penmarc'h, Finistère, France (47°45′N 4°30′W) by SM UC-21 (Imperial German Navy) with the loss of a crew member.
Ellida	Norway	World War I: The cargo ship was sunk in the North Sea 2.5 nautical miles (4.6 km) east north east of Whitby, Yorkshire, United Kingdom by SM UB-41 (Imperial German Navy). Her crew survived.
Elswick Manor	United Kingdom	World War I: The cargo ship was torpedoed and sunk in the Atlantic Ocean 180 nautical miles (330 km) west of Ouessant, Finistère, France (47°36′N 9°32′W) by SM U-84 (Imperial German Navy). Her crew survived.
Gold Coast	United Kingdom	World War I: The cargo ship was torpedoed and sunk in the Atlantic Ocean 14 nautical miles (26 km) south of Mine Head, Waterford (51°46′N 7°28′W) by SM UC-47 (Imperial German Navy). Her crew survived.
Howth Head	United Kingdom	World War I: The cargo ship was torpedoed and sunk in the Atlantic Ocean 158 nautical miles (293 km) north west of the Fastnet Rock (52°20′N 13°38′W) by SM U-60 (Imperial German Navy) with the loss of two crew.
Jewel	United Kingdom	World War I: The brig was scuttled in St. George's Channel 20 nautical miles (37 km) south east of the Coningbeg Lightship (United Kingdom) by SM UC-47 (Imperial German Navy). Her crew survived.
HMT Lobelia	Royal Navy	World War I: The naval trawler struck a mine and sank off Fanad Point, Lough Swilly (55°16′N 7°45′W) with the loss of eleven crew.
Poltava	United Kingdom	World War I: The coaster struck a mine and sank in the North Sea 3 nautical miles (5.6 km) east north east of the Souter Point Lighthouse, South Shields, County Durham (54°59′00″N 1°16′30″W). Her crew survived.
SMS Seeadler	Imperial German Navy	The hulk exploded and sank at Wilhelmshaven, Lower Saxony.
Senator Dantziger	United Kingdom	World War I: the schooner was shelled and sunk in the English Channel 15 nautical miles (28 km) south by east of Newhaven, Sussex by SM UC-26 (Imperial German Navy). Her crew survived.
Senhora da Conceicao	Portugal	World War I: The sailing vessel was scuttled in the Atlantic Ocean north of Cape Finisterre, Spain (43°38′N 10°00′W) by SM U-52 (Imperial German Navy).
Sowwell	United Kingdom	World War I: The cargo ship was torpedoed and sunk in the Atlantic Ocean 170 nautical miles (310 km) west of Gibraltar by SM U-35 (Imperial German Navy) with the loss of 21 crew.
HMT Star of Freedom	Royal Navy	World War I: The 125-foot (38 m), 258-ton steam minesweeping naval trawler struck a mine laid by SM UC-47 (Imperial German Navy) and sank in the Atlantic Ocean off Trevose Head, Cornwall (50°35′N 5°25′W) with the loss of ten of her crew.
Tempus	United Kingdom	World War I: The cargo ship was torpedoed and sunk in the Atlantic Ocean 130 nautical miles (240 km) north west by west of the Fastnet Rock by SM U-53 (Imperial German Navy) with the loss of a crew member.

== 20 April ==
List of shipwrecks: 20 April 1917
Ship	State	Description
Annapolis	United Kingdom	World War I: The cargo ship was torpedoed and sunk in the Atlantic Ocean 74 nautical miles (137 km) north west of Eagle Island, County Mayo (55°45′N 11°45′W) by SM U-61 and SM U-69 (both Imperial German Navy). Her crew survived.
August	Russia	World War I: The barque was sunk in the Atlantic Ocean 300 nautical miles (560 km) west of Ireland (50°25′N 16°40′W) by SM U-43 (Imperial German Navy).
Ballochbuie	United Kingdom	World War I: The coaster was torpedoed and sunk in the North Sea 7 nautical miles (13 km) east of the Isle of May, Fife by SM UC-41 (Imperial German Navy) with the loss of three of her crew. Survivors were rescued by the trawler HMT Aracari (Royal Navy) two days later 20 miles (32 km) southeast of May Island.
Caithness	United Kingdom	World War I: The cargo ship was torpedoed and sunk in the Atlantic Ocean 130 nautical miles (240 km) north west by north of Cape Ortegal, Spain (45°48′N 11°07′W) by SM U-52 (Imperial German Navy) with the loss of 47 crew.
Erith	United Kingdom	World War I: The trawler was scuttled in the North Sea 40 nautical miles (74 km) south of Girdleness, Aberdeenshire by SM UC-44 (Imperial German Navy). Her crew survived.
Emma	United Kingdom	World War I: The cargo ship was torpedoed and sunk in the Atlantic Ocean 200 nautical miles (370 km) south west by south of the Fastnet Rock (49°55′N 14°40′W) by SM U-50 (Imperial German Navy) with the loss of two crew.
Georgios	Greece	World War I: The cargo ship was sunk in the Bay of Biscay 11 nautical miles (20 km) south east of La Vieille, Finistère, France (47°56′N 4°27′W) by SM UC-21 (Imperial German Navy).
Grecian	United Kingdom	World War I: The trawler was scuttled in the North Sea 22 nautical miles (41 km) north east by east of the Longstone Lighthouse, Northumberland by SM UC-44 (Imperial German Navy). Her crew survived.
HMT Loch Eye	Royal Navy	World War I: The naval trawler struck a mine and sank in the Irish Sea 1.25 nautical miles (2.32 km) south west of Hook Point, County Waterford (52°08′N 6°59′W with the loss of seven of her crew.
Lowdale	United Kingdom	World War I: The collier was shelled and sunk in the Atlantic Ocean 90 nautical miles (170 km) west by north of Gibraltar by SM U-35 (Imperial German Navy). Her crew survived.
Malakand	United Kingdom	World War I: The cargo ship was torpedoed and sunk in the Atlantic Ocean 145 nautical miles (269 km) west of the Bishop Rock, Isles of Scilly (49°20′N 10°00′W) by SM U-84 (Imperial German Navy) with the loss of a crew member.
Nentmoor	United Kingdom	World War I: The cargo ship was shelled and sunk in the Atlantic Ocean 140 nautical miles (260 km) west of Gibraltar (35°25′N 8°02′W) by SM U-35 (Imperial German Navy). Her crew survived.
HMS Nepaulin	Royal Navy	World War I: The auxiliary minesweeper struck a mine and sank in the North Sea off the Dyck Lightship (United Kingdom) with the loss of nineteen of her crew.
HMT Othonna	Royal Navy	World War I: The naval trawler struck a mine and sank in the North Sea (56°17′N 2°27′W) with the loss of nine of her crew.
Portloe	United Kingdom	World War I: The cargo ship was torpedoed and sunk in the Atlantic Ocean 160 nautical miles (300 km) west north west of the Fastnet Rock (51°13′N 14°10′W) by SM U-67 (Imperial German Navy) with the loss of 24 crew.
Ringholm	Norway	World War I: The coaster was sunk in the North Sea 5 nautical miles (9.3 km) off St. Abb's Head, Berwickshire, United Kingdom by SM UC-41 (Imperial German Navy). Her crew survived.
HMT Ruthin Castle	Royal Navy	World War I: The naval trawler struck a mine and sank in the North Sea off Skinningrove, Yorkshire (54°37′N 0°53′W) with the loss of nine of her crew.
San Hilario	United Kingdom	World War I: The tanker was torpedoed and sunk in the Atlantic Ocean 270 nautical miles (500 km) west by north of the Fastnet Rock (50°55′N 16°28′W) by SM U-43 (Imperial German Navy). Her crew survived.
Torr Head	United Kingdom	World War I: The cargo ship was torpedoed and sunk in the Atlantic Ocean 160 nautical miles (300 km) north west by north of the Fastnet Rock (52°10′N 14°00′W) by SM U-60 (Imperial German Navy). Her crew survived.

== 21 April ==
List of shipwrecks: 21 April 1917
Ship	State	Description
Diadem	United Kingdom	World War I: The cargo ship was torpedoed and sunk in the Atlantic Ocean 200 nautical miles (370 km) south west by west of the Fastnet Rock by SM U-50 (Imperial German Navy). Her crew survived.
Emile et Charlotte	France	World War I: The fishing vessel was sunk in the Bay of Biscay north east of the Île d'Yeu, Vendée by SM UC-21 (Imperial German Navy). Her crew survived.
SMS G42	Imperial German Navy	World War I: Battle of Dover Strait: The Großes Torpedoboot 1913-class torpedo boat was rammed and sunk in the Strait of Dover by HMS Broke (Royal Navy) with the loss of 36 of her 83 crew.
SMS G85	Imperial German Navy	World War I: Battle of Dover Strait: The Großes Torpedoboot 1913-class torpedo boat was torpedoed and sunk in the Strait of Dover by HMS Swift (Royal Navy).
Gerda	Norway	World War I: The coaster was sunk in the North Sea 5 nautical miles (9.3 km) south west of Sumburgh Head, Shetland Islands, United Kingdom by SM UC-55 (Imperial German Navy). Her crew survived.
Giosue	Italy	World War I: The brigantine was shelled and sunk in the Mediterranean Sea off Tunis, Tunisia (37°53′N 10°06′E) by SM U-32 (Imperial German Navy).
Hercules	United States	The steam lighter was sunk in a collision with City of Atlanta (United States) in the North Channel in the harbor at Boston, Massachusetts.
Jedburgh	United Kingdom	World War I: The trawler was scuttled in the North Sea (35 nautical miles (65 km) north north west of Foula by SM UC-33 (Imperial German Navy). Her crew survived.
Peik	Norway	World War I: The coaster was sunk in the North Sea 10 nautical miles (19 km) north of Coquet Island, Northumberland, United Kingdom by SM UC-44 (Imperial German Navy). Her crew survived.
Pontiac	United Kingdom	World War I: The cargo ship was torpedoed and sunk in the Atlantic Ocean 56 nautical miles (104 km) south west of the Fastnet Rock (50°31′N 10°09′W) by SM U-53 (Imperial German Navy) with the loss of two crew.
Sebek	United Kingdom	World War I: The cargo ship was torpedoed and sunk in the Atlantic Ocean 145 nautical miles (269 km) north west of Tory Island, County Donegal (56°12′N 12°20′W) by SM U-70 (Imperial German Navy) with the loss of a crew member.
Skjold	Norway	World War I: The barque was shelled and sunk in the Atlantic Ocean west north west of the Fastnet Rock (51°41′N 14°37′W) by SM U-61 (Imperial German Navy). Her crew survived.
Telena	United Kingdom	World War I: The tanker was torpedoed and sunk in the Atlantic Ocean 170 nautical miles (310 km) west north west of the Fastnet Rock (51°16′N 14°00′W) by SM U-61 (Imperial German Navy). Her crew survived.
SM UC-30	Imperial German Navy	World War I: The Type UC II submarine struck a mine and sank in the North Sea 66 nautical miles (122 km) west of Nymindegab, Denmark with the loss of all 26 crew.
Ville de Dieppe	France	World War I: The barque was shelled and sunk in the Bay of Biscay west of the Île d'Oléron, Charente-Maritime (45°59′N 1°52′W) by SM UC-21 (Imperial German Navy). Her crew survived and were rescued by a French Navy submarine.
Warrior	United Kingdom	World War I: The cargo ship struck a mine and sank in the Mediterranean Sea 7 nautical miles (13 km) north east of the Fratelli Rocks, Tunisia with the loss of a crew member.
Yeovil	United Kingdom	World War I: The trawler was scuttled in the North Sea 35 nautical miles (65 km) north north west of Foula by SM UC-33 (Imperial German Navy) with the loss of a crew member.

== 22 April ==
List of shipwrecks: 22 April 1917
Ship	State	Description
Arethusa	United Kingdom	World War I: The barque was scuttled in the Atlantic Ocean 15 nautical miles (28 km) north west of Eagle Island, County Mayo by SM UC-66 (Imperial German Navy). Her crew survived.
Blaatind	Norway	World War I: The cargo ship was sunk in the Tyrrhenian Sea 30 nautical miles (56 km) off Civitavecchia, Lazio, Italy (42°28′N 10°59′E) by SM U-33 (Imperial German Navy) with the loss of two crew.
Capenor	United Kingdom	World War I: The cargo ship struck a mine and sank in the Bay of Biscay off La Pallice, Charente-Maritime, France (46°06′N 1°17′W). Her crew survived.
Giskø	Norway	World War I: The cargo ship was sunk in the North Sea (61°03′N 3°28′E by SM U-21 (Imperial German Navy). Her crew survived.
Godø	Norway	World War I: The coaster was sunk in the North Sea 16 nautical miles (30 km) east of the Shetland Islands, United Kingdom by SM UC-41 (Imperial German Navy). Her crew survived.
Maria S.	Italy	World War I: The sailing vessel was sunk in the Tyrrhenian Sea off Civitavecchia by SM U-33 (Imperial German Navy).
HMML 431	Royal Navy	The motor launch was lost on this date.
Neepawah	Canada	World War I: The cargo ship was scuttled in the Atlantic Ocean 120 nautical miles (220 km) south west of the Bishop Rock, Isles of Scilly, United Kingdom by SM U-53 (Imperial German Navy). Her crew survived.
Nightingale	United Kingdom	World War I: The fishing vessel was scuttled in the North Sea 26 nautical miles (48 km) south of Aberdeen by SM UC-44 (Imperial German Navy). Her crew survived.
Percy Birdsall	United States	World War I: The schooner was shelled and sunk in the Bay of Biscay off the Gironde Estuary by SM UC-21 (Imperial German Navy). Her crew survived.
Theodore William	Norway	World War I: The cargo ship was sunk in the North Sea 40 nautical miles (74 km) off the Shetland Islands (60°45′N 0°13′E) by SM U-21 (Imperial German Navy). Her crew survived.
Unione	Italy	World War I: The brigantine was sunk in the Tyrrhenian Sea off Civitavecchia (42°01′N 10°54′E) by SM U-33 (Imperial German Navy).
Valerie	Norway	World War I: The barque was shelled and sunk in the Bay of Biscay 30 nautical miles (56 km) west of the Cordouan Lighthouse, Charente Maritime by SM UC-21 (Imperial German Navy). Her crew survived.
Vestelv	Norway	World War I: The full-rigged ship was scuttled in the Atlantic Ocean 14 nautical miles (26 km) off Tory Island, County Donegal, United Kingdom by SM U-93 (Imperial German Navy). Her crew survived.
Woodward Abrahams	United States	World War I: The three-masted schooner was captured and scuttled with explosives in the Atlantic Ocean 407 nautical miles (754 km) west of the Fastnet Rock by SM U-43 (Imperial German Navy). Her crew survived.

== 23 April ==
List of shipwrecks: 23 April 1917
Ship	State	Description
Acadian	Norway	World War I: The barque was scuttled in the Atlantic Ocean 65 nautical miles (120 km) north west of Tory Island, County Donegal, United Kingdom (55°44′N 9°30′W) by SM U-52 (Imperial German Navy). Her crew survived.
Auriac	United Kingdom	World War I: The coaster was shelled and sunk in the North Sea 5 nautical miles (9.3 km) east south east of St Abb's Head, Berwickshire by SM UC-44 (Imperial German Navy) with the loss of a crew member.
Bandiera E. Moro	United Kingdom	World War I: The cargo ship was sunk in the Atlantic Ocean 50 nautical miles (93 km) west of Tangier, Morocco by SM U-35 (Imperial German Navy). Her crew survived.
Baron Stjernblad	Denmark	World War I: The coaster was sunk in the North Sea 5 nautical miles (9.3 km) north east of Eyemouth, Berwickshire by SM UC-44 (Imperial German Navy). Her crew survived.
Boro	Italy	World War I: The sailing vessel was sunk in the Aegean Sea east of Rhodes, Greece by SM UB-42 (Imperial German Navy).
Calluna	Denmark	World War I: The barque was sunk in the Atlantic Ocean south west of the Isles of Scilly, United Kingdom (48°51′N 8°38′W) by SM U-61 (Imperial German Navy). Her crew survived.
Cenobic	Belgium	World War I: The fishing vessel struck a mine and sank in the English Channel off Le Tréport, Seine-Inférieure, France with the loss of four of her crew.
Dykland	United Kingdom	World War I: The cargo ship was torpedoed and sunk in the Atlantic Ocean 200 nautical miles (370 km) west north west of the Fastnet Rock by SM U-50 (Imperial German Navy). Her crew survived.
Eptapyrgion	United Kingdom	World War I: The cargo ship was torpedoed and sunk in the Atlantic Ocean 150 nautical miles (280 km) west of the Isles of Scilly by SM U-53 (Imperial German Navy). Her crew survived.
Imataka	United Kingdom	World War I: The cargo ship was torpedoed and sunk in the Irish Sea 15 nautical miles (28 km) south south west of the Daunt Rock by SM UC-47 (Imperial German Navy). Her crew survived.
Lena	United Kingdom	World War I: The cargo ship was sunk in the Atlantic Ocean south west of the Isles of Scilly (48°45′N 8°30′W) by SM U-61 (Imperial German Navy) with the loss of all 25 crew.
HMT Lena Melling	Royal Navy	World War I: The naval trawler struck a mine and sank in the North Sea off the Elbow Lightship (United Kingdom) (51°22′30″N 1°33′30″E) with the loss of eleven of her crew.
Marita	Norway	World War I: The full-rigged ship was sunk in the Atlantic Ocean 110 nautical miles (200 km) west of St. Kilda, Inverness-shire, United Kingdom (58°21′N 10°34′W) by SM U-82 (Imperial German Navy). Her crew survived.
Oswald	United Kingdom	World War I: The cargo ship was torpedoed and sunk in the Atlantic Ocean 200 nautical miles (370 km) south west of the Fastnet Rock by SM U-50 (Imperial German Navy). Her crew survived.
HMT Rose II	Royal Navy	World War I: The naval trawler struck a mine and sank in the Irish Sea off Belfast, County Down (54°44′N 5°38′W) with the loss of six of her crew.
Savio	Italy	World War I: The cargo ship was sunk in the Bay of Biscay 20 nautical miles (37 km) south east of Belle Île, Morbihan, France by SM UC-36 (Imperial German Navy). Her crew survived.
Scot	Denmark	World War I: The cargo ship was sunk in the North Sea 12 nautical miles (22 km) east by north of St Abb's Head (56°02′N 1°46′W) by SM UC-44 (Imperial German Navy). Her crew survived.
Stegg	Norway	World War I: The coaster was sunk in the North Sea (60 nautical miles (110 km) east of Lerwick, Shetland Islands, United Kingdom (60°41′N 0°37′E) by SM UC-41 (Imperial German Navy) with the loss of a crew member.
Svanen	Denmark	World War I: The full-rigged ship was sunk in the Atlantic Ocean 30 nautical miles (56 km) west north west of Muckle Flugga, Shetland Islands by SM U-60 (Imperial German Navy) with the loss of two crew.

== 24 April ==
List of shipwrecks: 24 April 1917
Ship	State	Description
Amulree	United Kingdom	World War I: The barque was sunk in the Atlantic Ocean 50 nautical miles (93 km) north by east of Tory Island, County Donegal (56°10′N 8°40′W) by SM U-81 (Imperial German Navy). Her crew survived.
Anglesea	United Kingdom	World War I: The cargo ship was torpedoed and sunk in the Atlantic Ocean 160 nautical miles (300 km) south west of the Bishop Rock, Isles of Scilly (48°56′N 10°17′W) by SM U-53 (Imperial German Navy). Her crew survived.
Barnton	United Kingdom	World War I: The cargo ship was torpedoed and sunk in the Bay of Biscay 40 nautical miles (74 km) west by south of Pointe de Chassiron, Île d'Oléron, Charente-Maritime, France (45°40′N 2°12′W) by SM UC-21 (Imperial German Navy) with the loss of fourteen of her crew.
Bien Aime Prof. Luigi	United Kingdom	World War I: The sailing vessel was scuttled in the Atlantic Ocean off Cape St. Vincent, Portugal (36°53′N 9°10′W) by SM U-35 (Imperial German Navy).
Clan Galbraith	Norway	World War I: The four-masted barque was scuttled in the Atlantic Ocean west of Ireland (52°30′N 14°00′W) by SM U-70 (Imperial German Navy). Her crew survived.
Cordelia	Sweden	World War I: The barque was shelled and sunk in the Atlantic Ocean (51°08′N 15°13′W) by SM U-43 (Imperial German Navy). Her crew survived.
Eos	Denmark	World War I: The three-masted schooner was sunk in the Atlantic Ocean west of Ireland (52°40′N 14°45′W) by SM U-70 (Imperial German Navy). Her crew survived.
Ferndene	United Kingdom	World War I: The cargo ship was torpedoed and sunk in the Atlantic Ocean 150 nautical miles (280 km) west of the Bishop Rock by SM U-53 (Imperial German Navy) with the loss of nine crew.
Heather	United Kingdom	World War I: The drifter was scuttled in the Atlantic Ocean 14 nautical miles (26 km) west by north of the Bishop Rock (49°52′N 6°48′W) by SM UC-47 (Imperial German Navy). Her crew survived.
Kenilworth	United Kingdom	World War I: The cargo ship struck a mine and sank in the Atlantic Ocean 3.5 nautical miles (6.5 km) west by south of Point St. Mathieu, Finistère, France (48°17′N 4°48′W) by SM UC-36 (Imperial German Navy). Her crew survived.
La Providence	France	World War I: The schooner was sunk in the Loire Estuary by SM UC-36 (Imperial German Navy).
HMT Margate	Royal Navy	World War I: The naval trawler was shelled and sunk in the North Sea off Spurn Head, Yorkshire by SM UC-50 (Imperial German Navy) with the loss of thirteen of her crew.
Marie Blanche	France	World War I: The sailing vessel was sunk in the English Channel 30 nautical miles (56 km) north of Cherbourg, Seine Maritime (50°08′N 1°37′W) by SM UB-32 (Imperial German Navy) with the loss of a crew member.
Mayfly	United Kingdom	World War I: The trawler was shelled and sunk in the North Sea 75 nautical miles (139 km) north east by east of Scarborough, Yorkshire by SM UC-50 (Imperial German Navy) with the loss of three of her crew.
Metropolis	Norway	World War I: The four-masted barque was scuttled in the Atlantic Ocean south west of the Isles of Scilly (48°30′N 11°15′W) by SM U-61 (Imperial German Navy). Her crew survived.
Minister Tak van Poortvliet	Netherlands	World War I: The cargo ship was torpedoed and sunk in the North Sea 20 nautical miles (37 km) off IJmuiden, North Holland (52°42′N 3°32′E) by SM UB-10 (Imperial German Navy).
Nordsøen	Denmark	World War I: The cargo ship was scuttled in the Atlantic Ocean off Cape St. Vincent (37°02′N 8°54′W) by SM U-35 (Imperial German Navy). Her crew survived.
Plutus	United Kingdom	World War I: The collier was torpedoed and sunk in the Atlantic Ocean 9 nautical miles (17 km) north West of Trevose Head, Cornwall (50°41′N 5°07′W) by SM UC-47 (Imperial German Navy) with the loss if a crew member.
Thistleard	United Kingdom	World War I: The cargo ship was torpedoed and sunk in the Atlantic Ocean 135 nautical miles (250 km) west north west of Tory Island (55°10′N 12°00′W) by SM U-82 (Imperial German Navy). Her crew survived.
Torvore	Norway	World War I: The cargo ship was sunk in the Atlantic Ocean off Cape St. Vincent (37°00′N 8°54′W) by SM U-35 (Imperial German Navy). Her crew survived.
Upton Castle	United Kingdom	World War I: The trawler was scuttled in the North Sea 60 nautical miles (110 km) east of the Longstone Lighthouse, Northumberland by SM UC-29 (Imperial German Navy). Her crew survived.
Valkyrian	Sweden	World War I: The three-masted schooner was shelled and sunk in the Atlantic Ocean south west of Ireland by SM U-70 (Imperial German Navy) with the loss of a crew member.
Vestdal	Norway	World War I: The full-rigged ship was shelled and sunk in the Atlantic Ocean 280 nautical miles (520 km) west of Ireland (52°19′N 15°18′W) by SM U-70 (Imperial German Navy) with the loss of a crew member.
Vilhelm Krag	Norway	World War I: The cargo ship was sunk in the Atlantic Ocean 5 nautical miles (9.3 km) west of the Pildale Lighthouse, Portugal (37°03′N 8°44′W) by SM U-35 (Imperial German Navy). Her crew survived.

== 25 April ==
List of shipwrecks: 25 April 1917
Ship	State	Description
Abosso	United Kingdom	World War I: The passenger ship was torpedoed and sunk in the Atlantic Ocean 180 nautical miles (330 km) west by north of the Fastnet Rock (57°10′N 14°58′W) by SM U-43 (Imperial German Navy) with the loss of 65 lives.
Baigorry	France	World War I: The cargo ship was scuttled in the Bay of Biscay 15 nautical miles (28 km) south south east of Belle Île, Morbihan (47°04′N 2°54′W) by SM UC-21 (Imperial German Navy). Her crew survived.
Ballarat	United Kingdom	World War I: The troopship was torpedoed and damaged in the Atlantic Ocean 24 nautical miles (44 km) south by west of the Wolf Rock, Cornwall (49°33′N 5°36′W) by SM UB-32 (Imperial German Navy). She was taken under tow but consequently sank (49°51′45″N 5°19′00″W). Her crew and the troops on board survived.
E. G. Stoddard	United States	The barge sank in the Atlantic Ocean in an unknown location.
Elisabeth	Denmark	World War I: An attempt was made to scuttle the schooner in the Atlantic Ocean 70 to 80 nautical miles (130 to 150 km) south west of Ireland (51°02′N 12°05′W) by SM U-53 (Imperial German Navy). The derelict ship was discovered 180 nautical miles (330 km)) north west of the Fastnet Rock on 30 April by SM U-81 (Imperial German Navy), which also attempted to scuttle her, but she was kept afloat by her cargo of Pitch Pine. Although declared a constructive total loss, she was subsequently repaired and returned to service.
Elizabeth	Netherlands	World War I: The lugger was scuttled in the North Sea (52°36′N 3°40′E) by SM UB-10 (Imperial German Navy). Her crew survived.
Este	Denmark	World War I: The barque was sunk in the North Sea 50 nautical miles (93 km) west of Egerø, Norway (58°25′N 3°48′E) by SM UB-34 (Imperial German Navy). Her crew survived.
Étendard	French Navy	World War I: The Branlebas-class destroyer was torpedoed and sunk by an Imperial German Navy destroyer in the North Sea off Dunkirk, Nord, France, with the loss of all hands.
Glenesk	Norway	World War I: The barque was scuttled in the Atlantic Ocean 75 nautical miles (139 km) west north west of Eagle Island, County Mayo, United Kingdom by SM U-81 (Imperial German Navy). Her crew survived.
Havila	Denmark	World War I: The barque was sunk on the Atlantic Ocean 15 nautical miles (28 km) east north east of North Rona, United Kingdom by SM U-58 (Imperial German Navy). Her crew survived.
Hawthornbank	Denmark	World War I: The barque was sunk in the Atlantic Ocean 35 nautical miles (65 km) north by east of North Rona by SM U-58 (Imperial German Navy) with the loss of nine crew.
Heathfield	Norway	World War I: The barque was scuttled in the Atlantic Ocean 53 nautical miles (98 km) west by north of Eagle Island by SM U-81 (Imperial German Navy). Her crew survived.
Hesperides	United Kingdom	World War I: The cargo ship was torpedoed and sunk in the Atlantic Ocean 130 nautical miles (240 km) north west of the Fastnet Rock (52°00′N 13°50′W) by SM U-69 (Imperial German Navy) with the loss of a crew member.
Hirondelle	United Kingdom	World War I: The cargo ship was torpedoed and sunk in the Bay of Biscay 13 nautical miles (24 km) south by east of Belle Île, Morbihan, France by SM UC-36 (Imperial German Navy). Her crew survived.
Invermay	United Kingdom	World War I: The barque was scuttled in the Atlantic Ocean 40 nautical miles (74 km) north west by north of Eagle Island (54°40′N 11°00′W) by SM U-81 (Imperial German Navy). Her crew survived.
Laura	United Kingdom	World War I: The schooner was set afire and sunk in the Atlantic Ocean 150 nautical miles (280 km) west north west of the Fastnet Rock (51°20′N 13°30′W) by SM U-53 (Imperial German Navy). Her crew survived.
Hackensack	United Kingdom	World War I: The cargo ship was torpedoed and sunk in the Atlantic Ocean 180 nautical miles (330 km) south west of the Fastnet Rock by SM U-82 (Imperial German Navy) with the loss of six of her crew.
Sokoto	Denmark	World War I: The barque was sunk in the Atlantic Ocean 15 nautical miles (28 km) north east by north of North Rona by SM U-58 (Imperial German Navy). Her crew survived.
Swanmore	United Kingdom	World War I: The cargo ship was shelled and damaged in the Atlantic Ocean 230 nautical miles (430 km) west north west of the Fastnet Rock by SM U-43 and SM U-93 (both Imperial German Navy) She was then torpedoed and sunk by SM U-50 (Imperial German Navy) with the loss of eleven crew.

== 26 April ==
List of shipwrecks: 26 April 1917
Ship	State	Description
Active	United Kingdom	World War I: The 102.4-foot (31.2 m), 149-ton steam trawler was captured and then scuttled with explosives in the North Sea 65 nautical miles (120 km) east by south of the Longstone Lighthouse by SM UC-50 (Imperial German Navy). Her crew survived.
Agnes Cairns	United Kingdom	World War I: The sailing vessel was scuttled in the English Channel 8 nautical miles (15 km) north east of Alderney, Channel Islands by SM UC-65 (Imperial German Navy). Her crew survived.
Aigle	France	World War I: The brigantine was scuttled in the English Channel 11 nautical miles (20 km) south west of Start Point, Devon, United Kingdom by SM UC-47 (Imperial German Navy).
Alhama	United Kingdom	World War I: The cargo ship struck a mine and sank in the English Channel off Calais, Pas-de-Calais, France. Her crew survived.
Amsteldijk	Netherlands	World War I: The trawler was sunk in the North Sea off the Haaks Lightship (Netherlands) (52°56′N 4°10′E) by SM UC-63 (Imperial German Navy). Her crew were rescued by the trawler Voorbode (Netherlands.
Athole	United Kingdom	World War I: The auxiliary ketch was shelled and sunk in the English Channel 20 nautical miles (37 km) south of the Owers Lightship (United Kingdom) by SM UC-65 (Imperial German Navy). Her crew survived.
Augusta	Italy	The barque was scuttled in the Mediterranean Sea north east of Cap Bon, Tunisia (37°22′N 11°31′E) by SM UC-27 (Imperial German Navy).
Boy Dennis	United Kingdom	World War I: The fishing vessel was scuttled in the English Channel 10 nautical miles (19 km) south south west of Start Point, Devon by SM UC-21 (Imperial German Navy). Her crew survived.
Bretagne et Vendée	France	World War I: The sailing vessel was sunk in the English Channel off Alderney (49°51′N 2°04′W) by SM UC-65 (Imperial German Navy).
Chertsey	United Kingdom	World War I: The collier was torpedoed and sunk in the Mediterranean Sea 4 nautical miles (7.4 km) north of Algiers, Algeria (36°52′N 3°05′W) by SM UC-67 (Imperial German Navy). Her crew survived.
Ehrglis	Russia	World War I: The sailing vessel was set afire and sunk in the Atlantic Ocean (51°50′N 17°49′W) by SM U-43 (Imperial German Navy).
Gennarino	Italy	World War I: The three-masted schooner was scuttled in the Mediterranean Sea off Cap Bon (37°26′N 11°26′E) by SM UC-27 (Imperial German Navy).
Harflete	United Kingdom	World War I: The cargo ship was torpedoed, shelled and sunk in the Atlantic Ocean 200 nautical miles (370 km) north west by west of the Fastnet Rock (51°54′N 14°48′W) by SM U-70 (Imperial German Navy) with the loss of a crew member.
Hekla	Norway	World War I: The three-masted schooner was sunk in the Atlantic Ocean 120 nautical miles (220 km) north west of the Slyne Head Lighthouse, County Galway, United Kingdom by SM U-53 (Imperial German Navy). Her crew survived.
Hektoria	Norway	World War I: The cargo ship was sunk in the Atlantic Ocean (50°38′N 18°40′W) by SM U-43 (Imperial German Navy). Her crew survived.
John Lockett	Norway	World War I: The barque was scuttled in the English Channel 25 nautical miles (46 km) south of The Lizard, Cornwall, United Kingdom (49°32′N 5°05′W) by SM UC-47 (Imperial German Navy). Her crew survived.
Kong Oscar II	Norway	World War I: The sailing vessel was sunk in the Seine Estuary by SM UB-38 (Imperial German Navy). Her crew survived.
Monitor	United Kingdom	World War I: The schooner was scuttled in the Mediterranean Sea 20 nautical miles (37 km) south by east of Cap d'Antibes, Alpes-Maritimes, France (43°11′N 7°52′E) by SM U-33 (Imperial German Navy). Her crew survived.
HMT Plantin	Royal Navy	World War I: The naval trawler struck a mine and sank in the English Channel 3 nautical miles (5.6 km) east of Anvil Point, Dorset with the loss of nine of her crew.
HMT Repro	Royal Navy	World War I: The naval trawler struck a mine and sank in the North Sea off Tod Head, Aberdeenshire (56°53′N 2°08′W) with the loss of thirteen of her crew.
Rio Lages	United Kingdom	World War I: The cargo ship was torpedoed and sunk in the Atlantic Ocean 155 nautical miles (287 km) north west by north of the Fastnet Rock (51°38′N 12°52′W) by SM U-69 (Imperial German Navy) with the loss of three of her crew.
SMS Senator Sachse	Imperial German Navy	The Vorpostenboot was lost on this date.
Telefon	Norway	World War I: The sailing vessel was sunk in the North Sea (54°57′N 1°48′E) by SM UC-50 (Imperial German Navy). Her crew survived.
Vauxhall	United Kingdom	World War I: The cargo ship was torpedoed and sunk in the Atlantic Ocean 110 nautical miles (200 km) north west by west of the Fastnet Rock (51°45′N 12°30′W) by SM U-69 (Imperial German Navy) with the loss of two of her crew.
No. 1	Imperial Russian Navy	The submarine sank in a storm. She was refloated in the summer but was declared a constructive total loss.

== 27 April ==
List of shipwrecks: 27 April 1917
Ship	State	Description
HMT Agile	Royal Navy	World War I: The naval trawler struck a mine and sank in the North Sea 3 nautical miles (5.6 km) east of the Sunk Lightship (United Kingdom) with the loss of three of her crew.
HMS Alfalfa	Royal Navy	World War I: The collier was sunk in the Atlantic Ocean 30 nautical miles (56 km) off the Isles of Scilly (49°15′N 6°20′W) by SM UB-32 (Imperial German Navy) with the loss of 30 crew.
Beemah	United Kingdom	World War I: The collier was torpedoed and sunk in the Atlantic Ocean 30 nautical miles (56 km) south west by south of the Bishop Rock, Isles of Scilly by SM UB-32 (Imperial German Navy) with the loss of three of her crew.
Burrowa	United Kingdom	The four-masted barque was scuttled in the Atlantic Ocean 60 nautical miles (110 km) west of the Isles of Scilly by SM UC-65 (Imperial German Navy). Her crew survived.
Dromore	United Kingdom	World War I: The cargo ship was torpedoed and sunk in the Atlantic Ocean 140 nautical miles (260 km) west of Tory Island, County Donegal (56°30′N 11°40′W) by SM U-58 (Imperial German Navy). Her crew survived.
Dunmore Head	United Kingdom	World War I: The cargo ship was torpedoed and sunk in the Atlantic Ocean 135 nautical miles (250 km) west of Tory Island (56°12′N 12°00′W) by SM U-62 (Imperial German Navy). Her crew survived.
Glencluny	United Kingdom	World War I: The cargo ship was torpedoed and sunk in the Mediterranean Sea 4 nautical miles (7.4 km) north west of Cape Sigli, Algeria by SM UC-67 (Imperial German Navy) with the loss of four of her crew.
Good Hope	United Kingdom	World War I: The ketch was shelled and sunk in the English Channel 15 nautical miles (28 km) north north west of Barfleur, Manche, France by SM UC-72 (Imperial German Navy). Her crew survived.
Inveramsay	United Kingdom	World War I: The barque was shelled and sunk in the Atlantic Ocean north west of Ireland (56°00′N 11°30′W) by SM U-62 (Imperial German Navy) with the loss of all hands.
Jessie	United Kingdom	World War I: The schooner was scuttled in the English Channel 7 nautical miles (13 km) west of Portland Bill, Dorset by SM UB-38 (Imperial German Navy). Her crew survived.
Karuma	United Kingdom	World War I: The cargo ship was torpedoed and sunk in the Mediterranean Sea 5 nautical miles (9.3 km) north of Cape Sigle (37°09′N 4°50′E) by SM UC-67 (Imperial German Navy) with the loss of two of her crew.
Langfond	Norway	World War I: The cargo ship was sunk in the Atlantic Ocean (58°49′N 10°53′W) by SM U-58 (Imperial German Navy). Her crew survived.
Mafalda	Italy	World War I: The brigantine was scuttled in the Mediterranean Sea (43°06′N 7°40′E) by SM U-33 (Imperial German Navy).
Manchester Citizen	United Kingdom	World War I: The cargo ship was torpedoed and sunk in the Atlantic Ocean 240 nautical miles (440 km) north west of the Fastnet Rock (52°30′N 15°40′W) by SM U-70 (Imperial German Navy) with the loss of a crew member.
Margaret B. Rouss	United States	The schooner was captured and scuttled by burning in the Mediterranean Sea 42 nautical miles (78 km) south of Monaco by SM U-33 (Imperial German Navy). Her crew survived.
Nidelven	Norway	World War I: The cargo ship struck a mine and sank in the North Sea 10 nautical miles (19 km) north east of Coquet Island, Northumberland, United Kingdom (55°29′N 1°27′W) with the loss of three of her crew.
Ragnhild	Norway	World War I: The cargo ship struck a mine and sank in the North Sea 10 nautical miles (19 km) north of the mouth of the River Tyne (55°16′N 1°22′W) with the loss of two of her crew.
Uranus	Italy	World War I: The cargo ship was sunk in the Atlantic Ocean 60 nautical miles (110 km) west of the Fastnet Rock by SM U-81 (Imperial German Navy).
Verjø	Norway	World War I: The cargo ship was sunk in the Atlantic Ocean 10 nautical miles (19 km) north of the Stiff Lighthouse, Ouessant, Finistère, France by SM UC-36 (Imperial German Navy) with the loss of ten of her crew.

== 28 April ==
List of shipwrecks: 28 April 1917
Ship	State	Description
Alu Mendi	Spain	World War I: The cargo ship was sunk in the Atlantic Ocean 12 nautical miles (22 km) south south east of the Tuskar Rock, Ireland by SM UC-65 (Imperial German Navy).
Anne Marie	Norway	World War I: The sailing vessel was sunk in the Atlantic Ocean 160 nautical miles (300 km) north west of Ireland by SM U-70 (Imperial German Navy). Her crew survived.
Bullmouth	United Kingdom	World War I: The tanker was torpedoed and sunk in the Atlantic Ocean 125 nautical miles (232 km) north west by west of Tory Island, County Donegal (58°34′N 10°50′W) by SM U-58 (Imperial German Navy). Her crew survived.
Carmelo Padre	Italy	World War I: The sailing vessel was sunk in the Strait of Messina by SM U-63 (Imperial German Navy).
Condor	Russia	World War I: The cargo ship was sunk in the Atlantic Ocean 90 nautical miles (170 km) west of Ouessant, Finistère, France by SM UC-36 (Imperial German Navy).
Diana	Denmark	World War I: The barquentine was damaged in the Atlantic Ocean 200 nautical miles (370 km) south west of the Fastnet Rock (49°40′N 13°10′W) by SM U-93 (Imperial German Navy). She was subsequently towed into Queenstown, County Cork, United Kingdom where she was declared a total loss. Diana was later repaired and returned to service.
Giuseppe Padre I	Italy	World War I: The sailing vessel was sunk in the Strait of Messina by SM U-63 (Imperial German Navy).
Giuseppina G.	Italy	World War I: The sailing vessel was sunk in the Strait of Messina by SM U-63 (Imperial German Navy).
I Due Fratelli P.	Italy	World War I: The sailing vessel was sunk in the Strait of Messina by SM U-63 (Imperial German Navy).
Jose de Larrinaga	United Kingdom	World War I: The cargo ship was torpedoed and sunk in the Atlantic Ocean 150 nautical miles (280 km) west north west of the Fastnet Rock (51°32′N 13°20′W) by SM U-81 (Imperial German Navy) with the loss of twelve crew.
Juliette	France	World War I: The sailing vessel struck a mine and sank in the Mediterranean Sea off Mostaganem, Algeria.
Karonga	United Kingdom	World War I: The cargo ship was torpedoed and sunk in the Strait of Messina 2 nautical miles (3.7 km) south south east of Cape Schio, Italy by SM U-63 (Imperial German Navy) with the loss of eighteen crew. Her captain was taken as a prisoner of war.
Lisetta	Italy	World War I: The fishing vessel was sunk in the Mediterranean Sea 8 nautical miles (15 km) west of the Îles Sanguinaires, France by SM U-33 (Imperial German Navy). Her crew survived.
Medina	United Kingdom	World War I: The passenger ship was torpedoed and sunk in the English Channel 3 miles east northeast of Start Point, Devon (50°15′N 3°30′W) by SM UB-31 (Imperial German Navy). Ninety four survivors rescued by smack "Onward" (United Kingdom).
Natale B.	Italy	World War I: The sailing vessel was sunk in the Strait of Messina by SM U-63 (Imperial German Navy).
Niobe	Italy	World War I: The sailing vessel was sunk in the Mediterranean Sea off Malta by SM UC-37 (Imperial German Navy).
Olga	Russia	World War I: The cargo ship was shelled and sunk in the Barents Sea 89 nautical miles (165 km) off the North Cape, Finnmark, Norway by SM U-45 (Imperial German Navy).
Pontiac	United Kingdom	World War I: The cargo ship was sunk in the Mediterranean Sea 70 nautical miles (130 km) north east of Marsa Susa, Libya (34°04′N 22°06′E) by SM UC-74 (Imperial German Navy) with the loss of a crew member. Four of the survivors were taken as prisoners of war.
Port Jackson	United Kingdom	World War I: The four-masted barque was torpedoed and sunk in the Atlantic Ocean 180 nautical miles (330 km) west by north of the Fastnet Rock (51°00′N 14°02′W) by SM U-67 (Imperial German Navy) with the loss of fourteen crew.
Pursue	United Kingdom	World War I: The fishing vessel was scuttled in the English Channel 12 nautical miles (22 km) south west of Bolt Head, Devon by SM UB-32 (Imperial German Navy). Her crew survived.
San Francesco Di Paola	Italy	World War I: The sailing vessel was sunk in the Strait of Messina by SM U-63 (Imperial German Navy).
Teakwood	United Kingdom	World War I: The tanker was torpedoed and sunk in the Aegean Sea 26 nautical miles (48 km) south west by west of Sapientza, Greece (36°39′N 21°10′E) by SM U-14 (Austro-Hungarian Navy). Her crew survived.
Terence	United Kingdom	World War I: The cargo ship was shelled and sunk in the Atlantic Ocean 150 nautical miles (280 km) west by north of the Fastnet Rock (52°40′N 12°55′W) by SM U-81 (Imperial German Navy) with the loss of a crew member.
Vacuum	United States	World War I: The tanker was torpedoed and sunk in the Atlantic Ocean 120 nautical miles (220 km) west of Barra, Outer Hebrides, United Kingdom (57°20′N 10°10′W) by SM U-44 (Imperial German Navy) with the loss of her captain and 23 crew. 21 crew were rescued.

== 29 April ==
List of shipwrecks: 29 April 1917
Ship	State	Description
Askepot	Norway	World War I: The full-rigged ship was scuttled in the Atlantic Ocean 125 nautical miles (232 km) west of the Isles of Scilly, United Kingdom (49°48′N 9°17′W) by SM U-21 (Imperial German Navy). Her crew survived.
Bayonnais	France	World War I: The fishing vessel was scuttled in the Bay of Biscay off Guilvinec, Finistère by SM UC-72 (Imperial German Navy) with the loss of all four crew.
Carbo I	Denmark	World War I: The cargo ship was sunk in the North Sea (55°56′N 2°06′E) by SM UC-29 (Imperial German Navy). Her crew survived.
Comedian	United Kingdom	World War I: The cargo ship was torpedoed and sunk in the Atlantic Ocean 200 nautical miles (370 km) west of the Bishop Rock, Isles of Scilly (48°06′N 10°45′W) by SM U-93 (Imperial German Navy). Her crew survived.
Daleby	United Kingdom	World War I: The cargo ship was torpedoed and sunk in the Atlantic Ocean 180 nautical miles (330 km) north west of the Fastnet Rock by SM U-70 (Imperial German Navy) with the loss of 25 crew.
Dilston Castle	United Kingdom	World War I: The trawler was scuttled in the North Sea 16 nautical miles (30 km) east by south of Aberdeen (57°10′N 1°32′W) by SM UB-22 (Imperial German Navy). Her crew survived.
Ellen Harrison	United Kingdom	World War I: The schooner was shelled and sunk in the English Channel 7 nautical miles (13 km) north west of Cherbourg, Seine-Inférieure, France by SM UB-32 (Imperial German Navy). Her crew survived.
Eugènie et Lucie	France	World War I: The sailing vessel was sunk in the Bay of Biscay off Audierne, Finistère by SM UC-72 (Imperial German Navy).
Frère des Cinq Soeurs	France	World War I: The sailing vessel was sunk in the Bay of Biscay off Audierne by SM UC-72 (Imperial German Navy) Her crew survived.
Giuseppe Maria	Italy	World War I: The sailing vessel was sunk in the Strait of Sicily by SM UC-37 (Imperial German Navy).
Hurlford	United Kingdom	The collier was wrecked in Gunna Sound, Scotland.
Ikbal	United Kingdom	World War I: The cargo ship was torpedoed and sunk in the Atlantic Ocean 200 nautical miles (370 km) west by south of the Bishop Rock (48°34′N 12°35′W) by SM U-93 (Imperial German Navy). Her crew survived, but three of them were taken as prisoners of war.
Mermaid	United Kingdom	World War I: The schooner was scuttled in the English Channel 18 nautical miles (33 km) south south west of Anvil Point, Devon by SM UB-32 (Imperial German Navy). Her crew survived.
Petit Ernest	France	World War I: The fishing vessel was scuttled in the Bay of Biscay off Guilvinec by SM UC-72 (Imperial German Navy) with the loss of all three crew.
Victoria	United Kingdom	World War I: The cargo ship was torpedoed and sunk in the North Sea 5 nautical miles (9.3 km) north east by north of Scarborough, Yorkshire by SM UB-21 (Imperial German Navy) with the loss of a crew member.

== 30 April ==
List of shipwrecks: 30 April 1917
Ship	State	Description
HMT Arfon	Royal Navy	World War I: The naval trawler struck a mine and sank in the English Channel off St Alban's Head, Dorset (50°30′N 2°10′W) with the loss of ten of her crew.
Argo	United Kingdom	World War I: The trawler was shelled and sunk in the North Sea 15 nautical miles (28 km) east of Buchan Ness, Aberdeenshire by SM UB-22 (Imperial German Navy). Her crew survived.
Ascaro	Italy	World War I: The cargo ship was sunk in the Atlantic Ocean south west of Ireland (49°10′N 11°40′W) by SM U-93 (Imperial German Navy).
Borrowdale	Russian Empire	World War I: The barque was stopped and sunk in the Atlantic Ocean south of Ireland (49°00′N 10°20′W) by SM U-21 (Imperial German Navy). Her crew survived.
Chrisomalli Th. Sifneo	Greece	World War I: The cargo ship was sunk in the Mediterranean Sea east of Algiers, Algeria (36°55′N 4°02′E) by SM U-33 (Imperial German Navy). Her crew survived.
Colbert	France	World War I: The troopship was torpedoed and sunk in the Mediterranean Sea (37°05′N 8°22′E) by SM UC-37 (Imperial German Navy) with the loss of 51 lives.
Delamere	United Kingdom	World War I: The 1,525-ton United Africa Company cargo ship was torpedoed and sunk in the Atlantic Ocean 110 nautical miles (200 km) west by north of the Fastnet Rock (51°40′N 13°00′W) by SM U-70 (Imperial German Navy) with the loss of ten crew.
Durley Chine	United Kingdom	The 1,918-gross register ton tanker sank in 180 feet (55 m) of water in the North Atlantic Ocean east of Toms River, New Jersey, after colliding with the steamer Harlem (United States). Her entire crew of 28 survived. Her wreck is known as the "Bacardi Wreck."
Eden	Norway	World War I: The cargo ship was sunk in the English Channel off Worthing, Sussex, United Kingdom (50°48′N 0°22′W) by SM UC-70 (Imperial German Navy). Her crew survived.
Fortunata	Italy	World War I: The cargo ship was sunk in the Atlantic Ocean 130 nautical miles (240 km) west of the Fastnet Rock by SM U-62 (Imperial German Navy). Her crew survived.
Gorizia	Uruguay	World War I: The cargo ship struck a mine and sank in the English Channel 17 nautical miles (31 km) west by north of Portland Bill, Dorset (50°36′N 2°55′W).
Horsa	United Kingdom	World War I: The cargo ship was torpedoed and sunk in the Atlantic Ocean 195 nautical miles (361 km) south west by west of the Fastnet Rock (48°43′N 12°35′W) by SM U-93 (Imperial German Navy) with the loss of eleven of her crew. One of the survivors was taken as a prisoner of war.
Jarstein	Norway	World War I: The sailing vessel was sunk in the North Sea 80 nautical miles (150 km) south west by west of the Egerä Lighthouse (57°35′N 4°15′E) by SM U-61 (Imperial German Navy). Her crew survived.
Kuhwarder	Imperial German Navy	World War I: The Grasbrook-class Vorpostenboot was sunk by mines in Lister Deep.
Little Mystery	United Kingdom	World War I: The schooner was scuttled in the English Channel off Portland Bill by SM UC-61 (Imperial German Navy). Her crew survived.
Parthenon	Greece	World War I: The cargo ship was sunk in the Atlantic Ocean 200 nautical miles (370 km) south west of the Fastnet Rock (49°25′N 11°58′W) by SM U-93 (Imperial German Navy).
Portbail	France	World War I: The coaster was sunk in the English Channel north east of Cap Barfleur, Manche (50°05′N 0°55′W) by SM UB-32 (Imperial German Navy). Her crew survived.
Scow No. 9	United States	The scow sank at Jennings Dock, Southport, Connecticut.
HMS Tulip	Royal Navy	World War I: The Aubrietia-class sloop, operating as a Q-ship, was torpedoed and sunk in the Atlantic Ocean south west of Ireland by SM U-62 (Imperial German Navy) with the loss of 102 crew. Her captain survived and was taken as a prisoner of war.

== Unknown date ==
List of shipwrecks: Unknown date 1917
Ship	State	Description
Agia	Greece	World War I: The sailing vessel was sunk in the Mediterranean Sea off the coast of North Africa by SM UC-22 (Imperial German Navy).
Evangelistria	Greece	World War I: The sailing vessel was sunk in the Mediterranean Sea off the coast of North Africa by SM UC-22 (Imperial German Navy).
Kyriotis	Greece	World War I: The sailing vessel was sunk in the Mediterranean Sea off the coast of North Africa by SM UC-22 (Imperial German Navy). Her crew survived.
Martin II	Royal Navy	The 133.9-foot (40.8 m) 242-ton minesweeping Naval trawler was sunk in a collision in an unknown location on 4, 14, or 24 April.
