= E49 =

E49 may refer to:

- HMS E49
- European route E49
- Ban-etsu Expressway, route E49 in Japan
