= SM UC-76 =

1916 Type UC II submarine

History

German Empire
- Name: UC-76
- Ordered: 12 January 1916
- Builder: AG Vulcan, Hamburg
- Yard number: 81
- Launched: 25 November 1916
- Commissioned: 17 December 1916
- Fate: Surrendered, 1 December 1918; broken up, 1919 – 20

General characteristics
- Class & type: Type UC II submarine
- Displacement: 410 t (400 long tons), surfaced; 493 t (485 long tons), submerged
- Length: 50.45 m (165 ft 6 in) o/a; 40.30 m (132 ft 3 in) pressure hull
- Beam: 5.22 m (17 ft 2 in) o/a; 3.65 m (12 ft) pressure hull
- Draught: 3.65 m (12 ft)
- Propulsion: 2 × propeller shafts; 2 × 6-cylinder, 4-stroke diesel engines, 580–600 PS (430–440 kW; 570–590 shp); 2 × electric motors, 620 PS (460 kW; 610 shp)
- Speed: 11.8 knots (21.9 km/h; 13.6 mph), surfaced; 7.3 knots (13.5 km/h; 8.4 mph), submerged
- Range: 8,660–10,230 nmi (16,040–18,950 km; 9,970–11,770 mi) at 7 knots (13 km/h; 8.1 mph) surfaced; 52 nmi (96 km; 60 mi) at 4 knots (7.4 km/h; 4.6 mph) submerged
- Test depth: 50 m (160 ft)
- Complement: 26
- Armament: 6 × 100 cm (39.4 in) mine tubes; 18 × UC 200 mines; 3 × 50 cm (19.7 in) torpedo tubes (2 bow/external; one stern); 7 × torpedoes; 1 × 8.8 cm (3.5 in) Uk L/30 deck gun
- Notes: 30-second diving time

Service record
- Part of: I Flotilla; 13 February – 10 May 1917; Training Flotilla; 11 July – 11 November 1918
- Commanders: Oblt.z.S. Wilhelm Barten; 17 December 1916 – 10 May 1917; Oblt.z.S. Wilhelm Ziegner; 11 July - October 1918; Oblt.z.S. Karl Palmgren; October – 11 November 1918
- Operations: 2 patrols
- Victories: 13 merchant ships sunk (5,800 GRT); 1 warship sunk (725 tons); 1 auxiliary warship sunk (206 GRT); 1 merchant ship damaged (10,422 GRT)

SM UC-76 was a German Type UC II minelaying submarine or U-boat in the German Imperial Navy (German: Kaiserliche Marine) during World War I. The U-boat was ordered on 12 January 1916 and was launched on 25 November 1916. She was commissioned into the German Imperial Navy on 17 December 1916 as SM UC-76. (Note: "SM" stands for "Seiner Majestät" (English: His Majesty's) and combined with the U for Unterseeboot would be translated as His Majesty's Submarine.) In two patrols UC-76 was credited with sinking 15 ships, either by torpedo or by mines laid. UC-76 was surrendered on 1 December 1918 and broken up at Briton Ferry in 1919 – 20.

== Design ==
A Type UC II submarine, UC-76 had a displacement of 410 tonnes (400 long tons) when at the surface and 493 tonnes (485 long tons) while submerged. She had a length overall of 50.45 m (165 ft 6 in), a beam of 5.22 m (17 ft 2 in), and a draught of 3.65 m (12 ft). The submarine was powered by two six-cylinder four-stroke diesel engines each producing 290–300 metric horsepower (210–220 kW; 290–300 shp) (a total of 580–600 metric horsepower (430–440 kW; 570–590 shp)), two electric motors producing 620 metric horsepower (460 kW; 610 shp), and two propeller shafts. She had a dive time of 30 seconds and was capable of operating at a depth of 50 metres (160 ft).

The submarine had a maximum surface speed of 11.8 knots (21.9 km/h; 13.6 mph) and a submerged speed of 7.3 knots (13.5 km/h; 8.4 mph). When submerged, she could operate for 52 nautical miles (96 km; 60 mi) at 4 knots (7.4 km/h; 4.6 mph); when surfaced, she could travel 8,660 to 10,230 nautical miles (16,040 to 18,950 km; 9,970 to 11,770 mi) at 7 knots (13 km/h; 8.1 mph). UC-76 was fitted with six 100 centimetres (39 in) mine tubes, eighteen UC 200 mines, three 50 centimetres (20 in) torpedo tubes (one on the stern and two on the bow), seven torpedoes, and one 8.8 cm (3.5 in) Uk L/30 deck gun. Her complement was twenty-six crew members.

== Summary of raiding history ==
Date	Name	Nationality	Tonnage (Note: Merchant ship tonnages are in gross register tons. Military vessels are listed by tons displacement.)	Fate
7 March 1917	Naamah	United Kingdom	269	Sunk
7 March 1917	Vulcana	United Kingdom	219	Sunk
9 March 1917	Dana	Norway	753	Sunk
12 March 1917	HMS E49	Royal Navy	725	Sunk
12 April 1917	Caliban	United Kingdom	215	Sunk
12 April 1917	Chinkiang	United Kingdom	125	Sunk
12 April 1917	Crown Prince	United Kingdom	103	Sunk
12 April 1917	Equerry	United Kingdom	168	Sunk
12 April 1917	Fife Ness	United Kingdom	123	Sunk
12 April 1917	Largo Bay	United Kingdom	125	Sunk
12 April 1917	Lillian	United Kingdom	120	Sunk
12 April 1917	Osprey	United Kingdom	106	Sunk
13 April 1917	HMT Pitstruan	Royal Navy	206	Sunk
17 April 1917	Robert	Denmark	1,445	Sunk
17 April 1917	Winifredian	United Kingdom	10,422	Damaged
18 April 1917	Bergensgut	Norway	2,029	Sunk
