= SM UC-41 =

German Type UC II minelaying U-boat

Coordinates: 56°25′N 2°35′E

History

German Empire
- Name: UC-41
- Ordered: 20 November 1915
- Builder: AG Vulcan, Hamburg
- Yard number: 74
- Launched: 13 September 1916
- Commissioned: 11 October 1916
- Fate: Sunk, 21 August 1917

General characteristics
- Class & type: Type UC II submarine
- Displacement: 400 t (390 long tons), surfaced; 480 t (470 long tons), submerged
- Length: 49.45 m (162 ft 3 in) o/a; 40.30 m (132 ft 3 in) pressure hull
- Beam: 5.22 m (17 ft 2 in) o/a; 3.65 m (12 ft) pressure hull
- Draught: 3.68 m (12 ft 1 in)
- Propulsion: 2 × propeller shafts; 2 × 6-cylinder, 4-stroke diesel engines, 520 PS (380 kW; 510 shp); 2 × electric motors, 460 PS (340 kW; 450 shp)
- Speed: 11.7 knots (21.7 km/h; 13.5 mph), surfaced; 6.7 knots (12.4 km/h; 7.7 mph), submerged
- Range: 9,410 nmi (17,430 km; 10,830 mi) at 7 knots (13 km/h; 8.1 mph) surfaced; 60 nmi (110 km; 69 mi) at 4 knots (7.4 km/h; 4.6 mph) submerged
- Test depth: 50 m (160 ft)
- Complement: 26
- Armament: 6 × 100 cm (39.4 in) mine tubes; 18 × UC 200 mines; 3 × 50 cm (19.7 in) torpedo tubes (2 bow/external; one stern); 7 × torpedoes; 1 × 8.8 cm (3.5 in) Uk L/30 deck gun
- Notes: 48-second diving time

Service record
- Part of: I Flotilla; 18 December 1916 – 21 August 1917
- Commanders: Kptlt. Kurt Bernis; 11 October 1916 – 4 August 1917; Oblt.z.S. Hans Förste; 5 – 21 August 1917
- Operations: 7 patrols
- Victories: 15 merchant ships sunk (18,870 GRT); 2 auxiliary warships sunk (375 GRT); 2 merchant ships damaged (1,232 GRT)

SM UC-41 was a German Type UC II minelaying submarine or U-boat in the German Imperial Navy (German: Kaiserliche Marine) during World War I. The U-boat was ordered on 20 November 1915 and was launched on 13 September 1916. She was commissioned into the German Imperial Navy on 11 October 1916 as SM UC-41. (Note: "SM" stands for "Seiner Majestät" (English: His Majesty's) and combined with the U for Unterseeboot would be translated as His Majesty's Submarine.)

In a nine-month career that encompassed seven patrols UC-41 was credited with sinking 17 ships totaling 19,245 GRT, either by torpedo or by mines laid. The writer David Masters attributed the sinking of the two tiny naval fishing smacks Nelson and Ethel & Millie to UC-41 during an engagement on 15 August 1917. However this was actually UC-63, the logs of which record the event.

UC-41 was lost on 21 August 1917 after suffering an unexplained internal explosion of one of her mines which forced her to suddenly rise to the surface in the Tay estuary, where she was spotted by British naval trawlers and depth charged, killing all 27 German sailors and possibly seven British prisoners of war as well. Her wreck was rediscovered in 2003.

== Design ==
A Type UC II submarine, UC-41 had a displacement of 400 tonnes (390 long tons) when at the surface and 480 tonnes (470 long tons) while submerged. She had a length overall of 49.45 m (162 ft 3 in), a beam of 5.22 m (17 ft 2 in), and a draught of 3.68 m (12 ft 1 in). The submarine was powered by two six-cylinder four-stroke diesel engines each producing 260 metric horsepower (190 kW; 260 shp) (a total of 520 metric horsepower (380 kW; 510 shp)), two electric motors producing 460 metric horsepower (340 kW; 450 shp), and two propeller shafts. She had a dive time of 48 seconds and was capable of operating at a depth of 50 metres (160 ft).

The submarine had a maximum surface speed of 11.7 knots (21.7 km/h; 13.5 mph) and a submerged speed of 6.7 knots (12.4 km/h; 7.7 mph). When submerged, she could operate for 60 nautical miles (110 km; 69 mi) at 4 knots (7.4 km/h; 4.6 mph); when surfaced, she could travel 9,410 nautical miles (17,430 km; 10,830 mi) at 7 knots (13 km/h; 8.1 mph). UC-41 was fitted with six 100 centimetres (39 in) mine tubes, eighteen UC 200 mines, three 50 centimetres (20 in) torpedo tubes (one on the stern and two on the bow), seven torpedoes, and one 8.8 cm (3.5 in) Uk L/30 deck gun. Her complement was twenty-six crew members.

== Summary of raiding history ==
| Date | Name | Nationality | Tonnage (Note: Merchant ship tonnages are in gross register tons. Military vessels are listed by tons displacement.) | Fate |
|---|---|---|---|---|
| 1 March 1917 | Tillycorthie | United Kingdom | 382 | Sunk |
| 1 March 1917 | Orion | Norway | 1,354 | Sunk |
| 3 March 1917 | Elfi | Norway | 1,120 | Damaged |
| 3 March 1917 | Ring | Norway | 998 | Sunk |
| 13 April 1917 | Breadalbane | United Kingdom | 112 | Damaged |
| 13 April 1917 | Stork | United Kingdom | 152 | Sunk |
| 16 April 1917 | Lord Chancellor | United Kingdom | 135 | Sunk |
| 17 April 1917 | U.s.a. | United Kingdom | 182 | Sunk |
| 18 April 1917 | John S. Boyle | United Kingdom | 143 | Sunk |
| 18 April 1917 | Rameses | United Kingdom | 155 | Sunk |
| 20 April 1917 | Ballochbuie | United Kingdom | 921 | Sunk |
| 20 April 1917 | HMT Othonna | Royal Navy | 180 | Sunk |
| 20 April 1917 | Ringholm | Norway | 705 | Sunk |
| 22 April 1917 | Godø | Norway | 870 | Sunk |
| 23 April 1917 | Stegg | Norway | 463 | Sunk |
| 11 June 1917 | Breid | Norway | 1,062 | Sunk |
| 16 July 1917 | Valentia | United Kingdom | 3,242 | Sunk |
| 25 July 1917 | Oakleaf | United Kingdom | 8,106 | Sunk |
| 22 August 1917 | HMT Sophron | Royal Navy | 195 | Sunk |
