= SM UC-30 =

German Type UC II minelaying U-boat

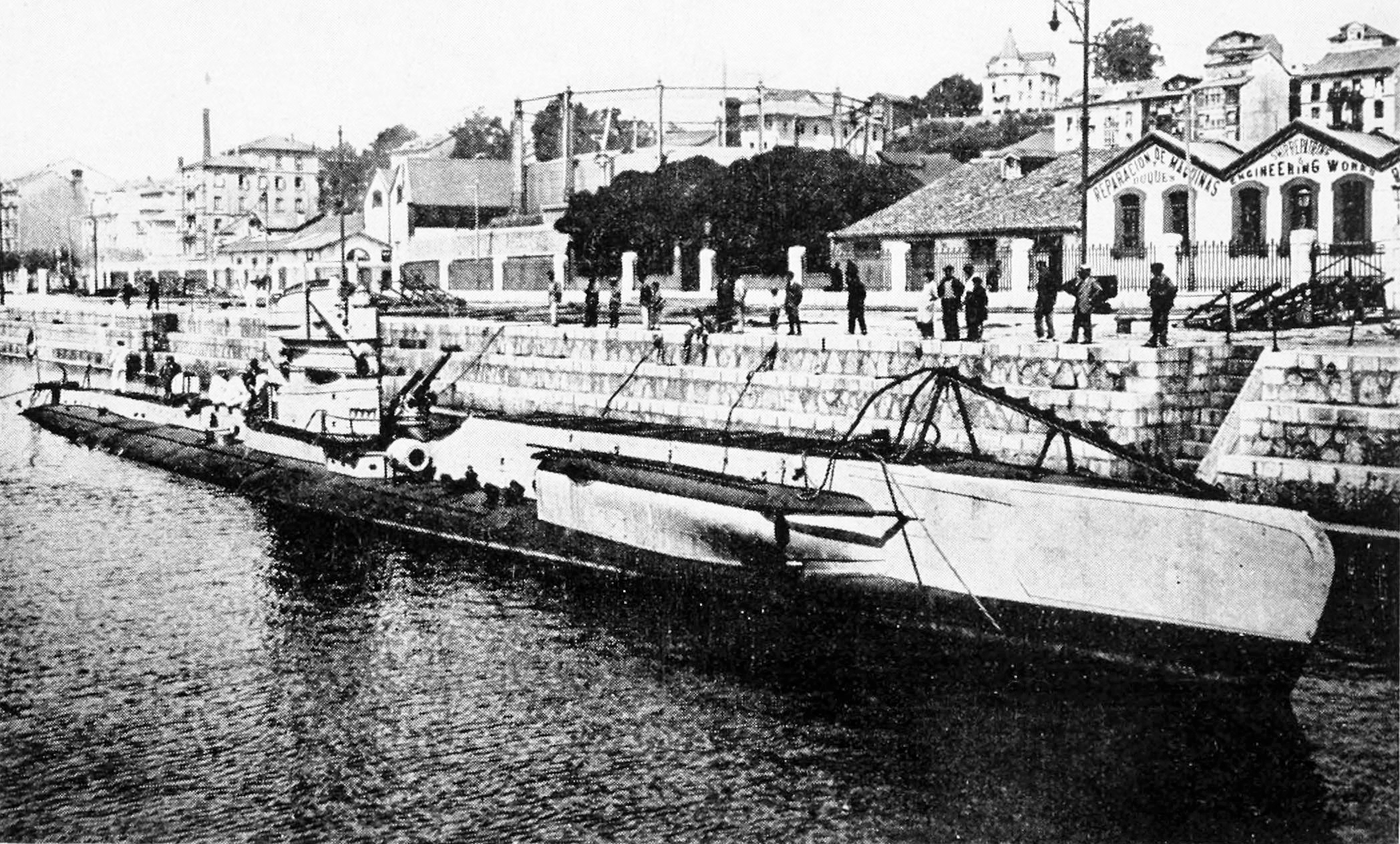

History

German Empire
- Name: UC-30
- Ordered: 29 August 1915
- Builder: AG Vulcan, Hamburg
- Yard number: 69
- Launched: 27 July 1916
- Commissioned: 22 August 1916
- Fate: Sunk by mine, 21 April 1917

General characteristics
- Class & type: Type UC II submarine
- Displacement: 400 t (390 long tons), surfaced; 480 t (470 long tons), submerged
- Length: 49.45 m (162 ft 3 in) o/a; 39.30 m (128 ft 11 in) pressure hull
- Beam: 5.22 m (17 ft 2 in) o/a; 3.65 m (12 ft) pressure hull
- Draught: 3.68 m (12 ft 1 in)
- Propulsion: 2 × propeller shafts; 2 × 6-cylinder, 4-stroke diesel engines, 520 PS (380 kW; 510 bhp); 2 × electric motors, 460 PS (340 kW; 450 shp)
- Speed: 11.6 knots (21.5 km/h; 13.3 mph), surfaced; 6.7 knots (12.4 km/h; 7.7 mph), submerged
- Range: 9,410 nmi (17,430 km; 10,830 mi) at 7 knots (13 km/h; 8.1 mph), surfaced; 53 nmi (98 km; 61 mi) at 4 knots (7.4 km/h; 4.6 mph), submerged
- Test depth: 50 m (160 ft)
- Complement: 26
- Armament: 6 × 100 cm (39.4 in) mine tubes; 18 × UC 200 mines; 3 × 50 cm (19.7 in) torpedo tubes (2 bow/external; one stern); 7 × torpedoes; 1 × 8.8 cm (3.5 in) Uk L/30 deck gun
- Notes: 48-second diving time

Service record
- Part of: I Flotilla; 16 November 1916 – 21 April 1917
- Commanders: Kptlt. Heinrich Stenzler; 22 August 1916 – 21 April 1917
- Operations: 4 patrols
- Victories: 3 merchant ships sunk (5,413 GRT); 2 auxiliary warships sunk (454 GRT)

SM UC-30 was a German Type UC II minelaying submarine or U-boat in the German Imperial Navy (German: Kaiserliche Marine) during World War I. The U-boat was ordered on 29 August 1915 and was launched on 27 July 1916. She was commissioned into the German Imperial Navy on 22 August 1916 as SM UC-30. (Note: "SM" stands for "Seiner Majestät" (English: His Majesty's) and combined with the U for Unterseeboot would be translated as His Majesty's Submarine.) In four patrols UC-30 was credited with sinking five ships, either by torpedo or by mines laid. UC-30 was mined and sunk off Horns Reef on 21 April 1917. The wreck was discovered in 2016.

== Design ==
A Type UC II submarine, UC-30 had a displacement of 400 tonnes (390 long tons) when at the surface and 480 tonnes (470 long tons) while submerged. She had a length overall of 49.45 m (162 ft 3 in), a beam of 5.22 m (17 ft 2 in), and a draught of 3.68 m (12 ft 1 in). The submarine was powered by two six-cylinder four-stroke diesel engines each producing 260 metric horsepower (190 kW; 260 shp) (a total of 520 metric horsepower (380 kW; 510 shp)), two electric motors producing 460 metric horsepower (340 kW; 450 shp), and two propeller shafts. She had a dive time of 48 seconds and was capable of operating at a depth of 50 metres (160 ft).

The submarine had a maximum surface speed of 11.6 knots (21.5 km/h; 13.3 mph) and a submerged speed of 6.7 knots (12.4 km/h; 7.7 mph). When submerged, she could operate for 53 nautical miles (98 km; 61 mi) at 4 knots (7.4 km/h; 4.6 mph); when surfaced, she could travel 9,410 nautical miles (17,430 km; 10,830 mi) at 7 knots (13 km/h; 8.1 mph). UC-30 was fitted with six 100 centimetres (39 in) mine tubes, eighteen UC 200 mines, three 50 centimetres (20 in) torpedo tubes (one on the stern and two on the bow), seven torpedoes, and one 8.8 cm (3.5 in) Uk L/30 deck gun. Her complement was twenty-six crew members.

== Captain ==
On 20 June 1917 the remains of a human whose mostly decomposed remains were kept together by a German uniform was found washed ashore in Bjergehuse in Sønder Nissum parish, Denmark. The parish priest described the remains as those of a ca. 30-year-old, handsomely and strongly built man and assumed him to be a downed and drowned airman. The remains were buried in the parish on 23 June 1917. On 17 October 1917 the German legation in Copenhagen informed the ministry for Ecclesiastical Affairs that the remains had been identified as those of the captain of submarine 30, Kapitänleutnant Johann Heinrich Wilhelm Maximilian Stenzler and requested on behalf of his family that his remains be exhumed and transferred to Germany for burial there. On 15 November 1917 the grave was thus opened, the remains transferred to a zinc lined coffin and repatriated. On 28 November 1917 Stenzler was buried in the family grave in Stralsund. The Sønder Nissum parish priest received a letter from Stenzler's mother, a widow in Stralsund. According to this letter, Stenzler was born 1 July 1886 in Cassel, to Max Israël formerly mayor of Stralsund and Maria née Wellsmann and later took the name Stenzler.

== Wreck ==
The wreck was located by JD-Contractor A/S in 2016 outside Esbjerg, still carrying 18 mines and 6 torpedoes. The submerged wreck was identified in part using multibeam sonar, see animation.

Previously, a Danish diving company claimed to have identified a wreck originally found in 2005 as the UC-30. The assumed wreck was located about 66 nautical miles (122 km; 76 mi) straight west of Nymindegab (approx. 55°49′N 6°12′E) at a depth of 46 metres (151 ft). The company intended to dive on the location in the summer of 2011.

== Summary of raiding history ==
Date	Name	Nationality	Tonnage (Note: Merchant ship tonnages are in gross register tons. Military vessels are listed by tons displacement.)	Fate
26 November 1916	Romance	Norway	628	Sunk
12 February 1917	HMT Euston	Royal Navy	209	Sunk
16 February 1917	HMT Recepto	Royal Navy	245	Sunk
4 April 1917	Hunstanton	United Kingdom	4,504	Sunk
4 April 1917	Monte Protegido	Argentina	281	Sunk
