= SM UB-36 =

Coordinates: 48°42′N 5°14′W

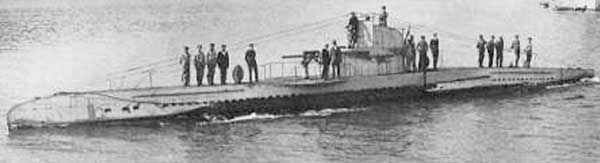
- SM UB-45 a U-boat similar to UB-36

History

German Empire
- Name: UB-36
- Ordered: 22 July 1915
- Builder: Blohm & Voss, Hamburg
- Cost: 1,152,000 German Papiermark
- Yard number: 260
- Launched: 15 January 1916
- Completed: 22 May 1916
- Commissioned: 22 May 1916
- Fate: Sunk 9 May 1917

General characteristics
- Class & type: Type UB II submarine
- Displacement: 274 t (270 long tons) surfaced; 303 t (298 long tons) submerged
- Length: 36.90 m (121 ft 1 in) o/a; 27.90 m (91 ft 6 in) pressure hull
- Beam: 4.37 m (14 ft 4 in) o/a; 3.85 m (12 ft 8 in) pressure hull
- Draught: 3.69 m (12 ft 1 in)
- Propulsion: 1 × propeller shaft; 2 × 6-cylinder diesel engine, 284 PS (209 kW; 280 bhp); 2 × electric motor, 280 PS (210 kW; 280 shp)
- Speed: 9.15 knots (16.95 km/h; 10.53 mph) surfaced; 5.81 knots (10.76 km/h; 6.69 mph) submerged
- Range: 6,450 nmi (11,950 km; 7,420 mi) at 5 knots (9.3 km/h; 5.8 mph) surfaced; 45 nmi (83 km; 52 mi) at 4 knots (7.4 km/h; 4.6 mph) submerged
- Test depth: 50 m (160 ft)
- Complement: 2 officers, 21 men
- Armament: 2 × 50 cm (19.7 in) torpedo tubes; 4 × torpedoes (later 6); 1 × 8.8 cm (3.5 in) Uk L/30 deck gun
- Notes: 42-second diving time

Service record
- Part of: Baltic Flotilla; 26 June 1916 – 23 February 1917; Flandern Flotilla; 23 February – 9 May 1917
- Commanders: Oblt.z.S. Kurt Albrecht; 22 May – 12 December 1916; Oblt.z.S. Harald von Keyserlingk; 13 December 1916 – 9 May 1917
- Operations: 12 patrols
- Victories: 7 merchant ships sunk (1,584 GRT); 2 merchant ships taken as prize (917 GRT)

SM UB-36 (Note: "SM" stands for "Seiner Majestät" (English: His Majesty's) and combined with the U for Unterseeboot would be translated as His Majesty's Submarine.) was a German Type UB II submarine or U-boat in the German Imperial Navy (German: Kaiserliche Marine) during World War I. The U-boat was ordered on 22 July 1915 and launched on 15 January 1916. She was commissioned into the German Imperial Navy on 22 May 1916 as SM UB-36.

The submarine sank seven ships in twelve patrols. She herself was sunk in May 1917, but her fate is a matter of dispute. Some sources claim that UB-36 was rammed and presumably sunk by the French steamer SS Molière in the English Channel off Ushant, France, on 21 May 1917. Other sources states that this in fact was SM UC-36 and that UB-36 struck a mine and sank elsewhere.

== Design ==
A Type UB II submarine, UB-36 had a displacement of 274 tonnes (270 long tons) when at the surface and 303 tonnes (298 long tons) while submerged. She had a total length of 36.90 m (121 ft 1 in), a beam of 4.37 m (14 ft 4 in), and a draught of 3.69 m (12 ft 1 in). The submarine was powered by two Körting six-cylinder diesel engines producing a total 284 metric horsepower (280 shp; 209 kW), two Siemens-Schuckert electric motors producing 280 metric horsepower (210 kW; 280 shp), and one propeller shaft. She was capable of operating at depths of up to 50 metres (160 ft).

The submarine had a maximum surface speed of 9.15 knots (16.95 km/h; 10.53 mph) and a maximum submerged speed of 5.81 knots (10.76 km/h; 6.69 mph). When submerged, she could operate for 45 nautical miles (83 km; 52 mi) at 4 knots (7.4 km/h; 4.6 mph); when surfaced, she could travel 6,450 nautical miles (11,950 km; 7,420 mi) at 5 knots (9.3 km/h; 5.8 mph). UB-36 was fitted with two 50 centimetres (20 in) torpedo tubes, four torpedoes, and one 8.8 cm (3.5 in) Uk L/30 deck gun. She had a complement of twenty-one crew members and two officers and a 42-second dive time.

== Summary of raiding history ==
Date	Name	Nationality	Tonnage (Note: Tonnages are in gross register tons)	Fate
30 July 1916	Anna	Sweden	172	Sunk
30 July 1916	Pitea	Sweden	644	Captured as prize
1 August 1916	Hudiksvall	Sweden	481	Sunk
1 August 1916	Pehr Brahe	Finland	499	Sunk
18 March 1917	Avance	Norway	273	Captured as prize
1 April 1917	Jolie Brise	France	18	Sunk
1 April 1917	Providence De Dieu	France	15	Sunk
16 April 1917	Marden	United Kingdom	297	Sunk
16 April 1917	Rochester Castle	United Kingdom	102	Sunk

== Bibliography ==
- Bendert, Harald (2000). Die UB-Boote der Kaiserlichen Marine, 1914-1918. Einsätze, Erfolge, Schicksal (in German). Hamburg: Verlag E.S. Mittler & Sohn GmbH. ISBN 3-8132-0713-7.
- Gröner, Erich; Jung, Dieter; Maass, Martin (1991). U-boats and Mine Warfare Vessels. German Warships 1815–1945. Vol. 2. Translated by Thomas, Keith; Magowan, Rachel. London: Conway Maritime Press. ISBN 0-85177-593-4.
- Rössler, Eberhard (1979). Die deutschen U-Boote und ihre Werften: eine Bilddokumentation über den deutschen U-Bootbau; in zwei Bänden (in German). Vol. I. Munich: Bernard & Graefe. ISBN 3-7637-5213-7.
