= SS Delamere =

History
- Name: Delamere
- Namesake: Delamere, Cheshire or Delamere Forest
- Owner: Watson Steamship Co. (1915–1916); Bromport Steamship Co. (1916–1917)
- Port of registry: (United Kingdom) Liverpool
- Builder: Sunderland Shipbuilding Co., Sunderland, England
- Launched: 4 March 1915
- Completed: 13 April 1915
- Identification: Official number: 135365
- Fate: Sunk by submarine, 30 April 1917

General characteristics
- Type: Freighter
- Tonnage: 1,525 gross register tons (GRT); 878 net register tons (NRT)
- Length: 367.3 ft (112.0 m)
- Beam: 38.8 ft (11.8 m)
- Draught: 16.8 ft (5.1 m)
- Installed power: 224 nhp; 1,120 ihp (840 kW)
- Propulsion: 1 screw propeller; 1 triple-expansion steam engine
- Speed: 10.5 knots (19.4 km/h; 12.1 mph)

SS Delamere was a small freighter built during the First World War. Completed in 1915, she was intended for the West African trade. The ship was sunk by the German submarine SM U-70 in April 1917 with the loss of 10 crewmen.

== Description ==
Delamere had an overall length of 267.3 feet (81.5 m), with a beam of 38.8 feet (11.8 m) and a draught of 16.8 feet (5.1 m). The ship was assessed at 1,525 gross register tons (GRT) and 878 net register tons (NRT). She had a vertical triple-expansion steam engine driving a single screw propeller. The engine was rated at a total of 224 nominal horsepower and produced 1,120 indicated horsepower (840 kW). This gave her a maximum speed of 10.5 knots (19.4 km/h; 12.1 mph).

== Construction and career ==
Delamere, named for either Delamere, Cheshire, or the Delamere Forest, was laid down as yard number 288 by the Sunderland Shipbuilding Co. at its shipyard in Sunderland for the Watson Steamship Co. The ship was launched on 4 March 1915 and completed on 13 April. She was sold to the Lever Brothers' newly formed Bromport Steamship Co. on 11 May 1916. Delamere was enroute to Liverpool from Matadi, Belgian Congo, with a general cargo when she was torpedoed by U-70 110 miles (180 km) west of the Fastnet Lighthouse at coordinates 51.04°N 13.00°W with the loss of 10 crewmen on 30 April 1917.

== Bibliography ==
- Admiralty (1988) [1919]. "Merchant Shipping (Losses): British Merchant Vessels Captured or Destroyed by the Enemy". British Vessels Lost at Sea, 1914-18 and 1939-45 (3rd ed.). Wellingborough, UK: Patrick Stephens. pp. 1–99. ISBN 1-85260-134-5.
- Fenton, Roy (December 2022). "Levers' Early Shipping Ventures: Bromport Steamship Co., Ltd. and its Predecessors". Marine News Supplement. 76 (12): S340–S352. ISSN 0966-6958.
