= Buchan Ness =

Bridged island in the north east of Scotland

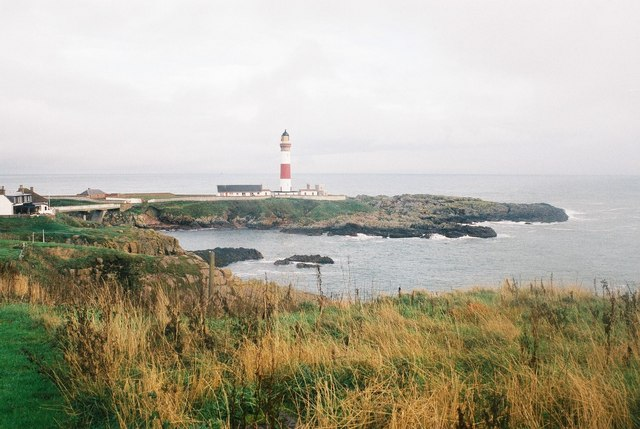

Location
- Buchan Ness shown within Scotland
- OS grid reference: NK135421
- Coordinates: 57.470°N 1.776°W

Physical geography
- Area: 4 ha (0 sq mi)
- Highest elevation: 5 m (16 ft)

Administration
- Council area: Aberdeenshire
- Country: Scotland
- Sovereign state: United Kingdom

Demographics
- Population: 1
- Population rank: 95=
- Population density: 25/km^{2} (65/sq mi)

Buchan Ness is a bridged island that is connected to the village of Boddam on mainland Scotland by a road running over a short causeway. In 2022 the census recorded a permanent population on the island of a single individual. The Gazetteer for Scotland describes Buchan Ness as a headland.

The island is the location of the Buchan Ness Lighthouse, which was automated in 1988 and also contains the ruins of Buchanness Lodge and some holiday cottages. The Lodge is an Italianate marine villa built in 1840 by John Smith for Lord Aberdeen. Below the pediment of the main door is inscribed procul negotiis beautus, which, roughly translated, means "lucky is the man who stays away from business".

Nearby skerries and islets are Inch Biggle off the south east coast of Boddam, and Meikle Mackie and The Skerry to the north.
