= HMS E49 =

Submarine of the Royal Navy

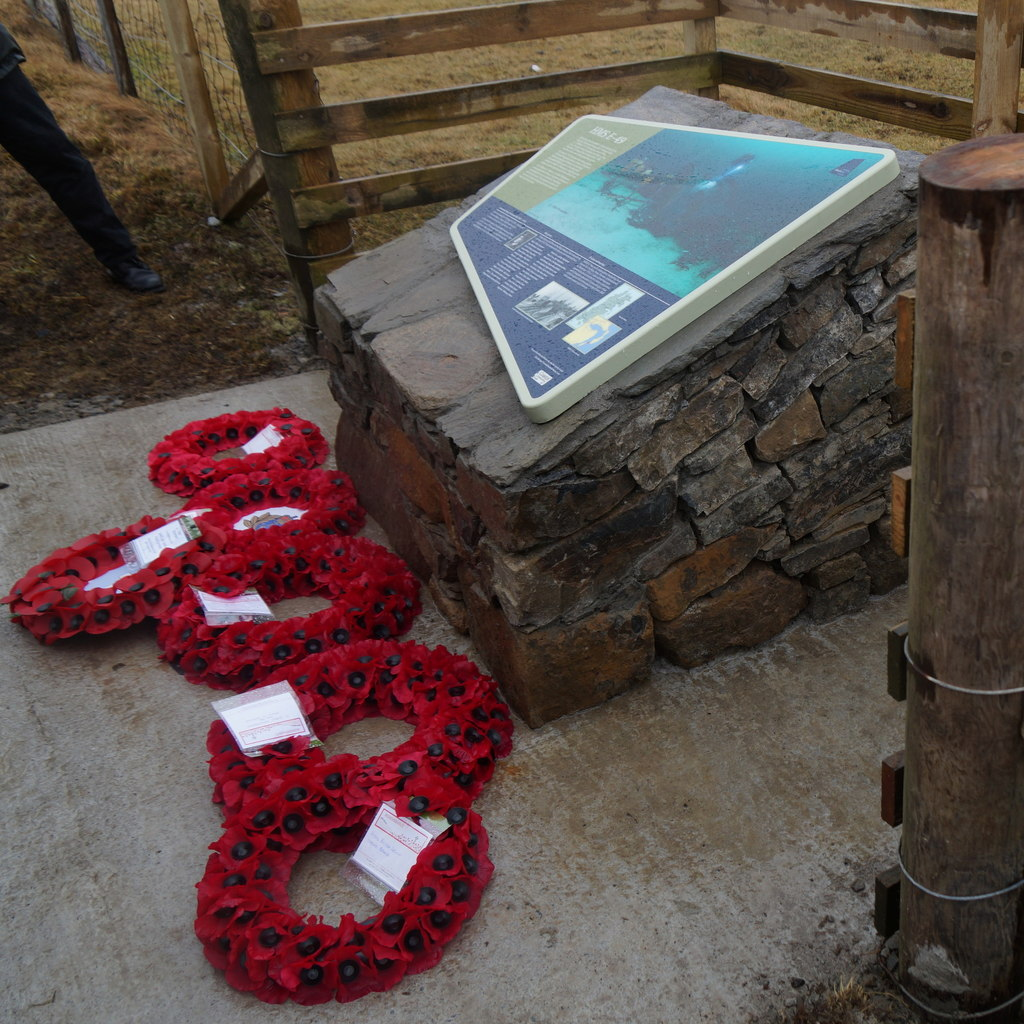

History

United Kingdom
- Name: E49
- Builder: Swan Hunter, Wallsend
- Laid down: 15 February 1915
- Launched: 18 September 1916
- Commissioned: 14 December 1916
- Fate: Mined, 12 March 1917

General characteristics
- Class & type: E-class submarine
- Displacement: 662 long tons (673 t) (surfaced); 807 long tons (820 t) (submerged)
- Length: 181 ft (55 m)
- Beam: 15 ft (4.6 m)
- Installed power: 1,600 hp (1,200 kW) (diesel engines); 840 hp (630 kW) (electric motors)
- Propulsion: 2 × 800 hp (600 kW) diesel engines; 2 × 420 hp (310 kW) electric motors; 2 × screws
- Speed: 15 kn (17 mph; 28 km/h) (surfaced); 10 kn (12 mph; 19 km/h) (submerged)
- Range: 3,000 nmi (3,500 mi; 5,600 km) at 10 kn (12 mph; 19 km/h) (surfaced); 65 nmi (75 mi; 120 km) at 5 kn (5.8 mph; 9.3 km/h) (surfaced)
- Complement: 30
- Armament: 5 × 18 inch (450 mm) torpedo tubes (2 bow, 2 beam, 1 stern); 1 × 12-pounder gun

HMS E49 was an E-class submarine built by Swan Hunter, Wallsend for the Royal Navy. She was laid down on 15 February 1915 and was commissioned on 14 December 1916. E49 was mined off the Shetland Islands on 12 March 1917. The minefield was laid by the German U-boat UC-76 on 10 March 1917. There were no survivors. E49 lies 96 ft (29 m) down with her bow blown off.

== Design ==
Like all post-E8 British E-class submarines, E49 had a displacement of 662 long tons (673 t) at the surface and 807 long tons (820 t) while submerged. She had a total length of 180 feet (55 m) and a beam of 22 feet 8.5 inches (6.922 m). She was powered by two 800 horsepower (600 kW) Vickers eight-cylinder two-stroke diesel engines and two 420 horsepower (310 kW) electric motors. The submarine had a maximum surface speed of 16 knots (30 km/h; 18 mph) and a submerged speed of 10 knots (19 km/h; 12 mph). British E-class submarines had fuel capacities of 50 long tons (51 t) of diesel and ranges of 3,255 miles (5,238 km; 2,829 nmi) when travelling at 10 knots (19 km/h; 12 mph). E49 was capable of operating submerged for five hours when travelling at 5 knots (9.3 km/h; 5.8 mph).

E49 was armed with a 12-pounder 76 mm (3.0 in) QF gun mounted forward of the conning tower. She had five 18 inch (450 mm) torpedo tubes, two in the bow, one either side amidships, and one in the stern; a total of 10 torpedoes were carried.

E-Class submarines had wireless systems with 1 kilowatt (1.3 hp) power ratings; in some submarines, these were later upgraded to 3 kilowatts (4.0 hp) systems by removing a midship torpedo tube. Their maximum design depth was 100 feet (30 m) although in service some reached depths of below 200 feet (61 m). Some submarines contained Fessenden oscillator systems.

== Memorial ==
A memorial to the 31 submariners lost in the sinking of E49 was unveiled in Baltasound, Unst, on 12 March 2017. The memorial was organised by retired local police constable Harry Edwards. The unveiling was attended by members of the crew of Royal Navy submarine HMS Vengeance (S31) and descendants of E49 First officer Basil Beal and second-in-command Reay Parkinson.

== Bibliography ==
- Hutchinson, Robert (2001). Jane's Submarines: War Beneath the Waves from 1776 to the Present Day. London: HarperCollins. ISBN 978-0-00-710558-8. OCLC 53783010.
