= U52 =

U52 may refer to:

== Naval vessels ==
- German submarine U-52, various vessels
- HMIS Godavari (U52), a sloop of the Royal Indian Navy
- U-52-class submarine of the Austro-Hungarian Navy

== Other uses ==
- Beaver Municipal Airport (Utah)
- Great stellated dodecahedron
- Small nucleolar RNA SNORD52
