= SM UC-50 =

German Type UC II minelaying U-boat

History

German Empire
- Name: UC-50
- Ordered: 12 January 1916
- Builder: Germaniawerft, Kiel
- Yard number: 266
- Launched: 23 November 1916
- Commissioned: 21 December 1916
- Fate: Missing since 7 January 1918

General characteristics
- Class & type: Type UC II submarine
- Displacement: 434 t (427 long tons), surfaced; 511 t (503 long tons), submerged
- Length: 52.69 m (172 ft 10 in) o/a; 40.96 m (134 ft 5 in) pressure hull
- Beam: 5.22 m (17 ft 2 in) o/a; 3.65 m (12 ft) pressure hull
- Draught: 3.64 m (11 ft 11 in)
- Propulsion: 2 × propeller shafts; 2 × 6-cylinder, 4-stroke diesel engines, 580–600 PS (430–440 kW; 570–590 shp); 2 × electric motors, 620 PS (460 kW; 610 shp)
- Speed: 11.8 knots (21.9 km/h; 13.6 mph), surfaced; 7.2 knots (13.3 km/h; 8.3 mph), submerged
- Range: 8,820–9,450 nmi (16,330–17,500 km; 10,150–10,870 mi) at 7 knots (13 km/h; 8.1 mph) surfaced; 56 nmi (104 km; 64 mi) at 4 knots (7.4 km/h; 4.6 mph) submerged
- Test depth: 50 m (160 ft)
- Complement: 26
- Armament: 6 × 100 cm (39.4 in) mine tubes; 18 × UC 200 mines; 3 × 50 cm (19.7 in) torpedo tubes (2 bow/external; one stern); 7 × torpedoes; 1 × 8.8 cm (3.5 in) Uk L/30 deck gun
- Notes: 30-second diving time

Service record
- Part of: I Flotilla; 18 February - 6 July 1917; Flandern / Flandern II Flotilla; 6 July 1917 – 7 January 1918
- Commanders: Kptlt. Rudolf Seuffer; 21 December 1916 – 7 January 1918
- Operations: 9 patrols
- Victories: 25 merchant ships sunk (42,005 GRT); 4 auxiliary warships sunk (866 GRT); 1 auxiliary warship damaged (270 GRT)

SM UC-50 was a German Type UC II minelaying submarine or U-boat in the German Imperial Navy (German: Kaiserliche Marine) during World War I. The U-boat was ordered on 20 November 1915 and was launched on 23 November 1916. She was commissioned into the German Imperial Navy on 21 December 1916 as SM UC-50. (Note: "SM" stands for "Seiner Majestät" (English: His Majesty's) and combined with the U for Unterseeboot would be translated as His Majesty's Submarine.) In nine patrols UC-50 was credited with sinking 29 ships, either by torpedo or by mines laid. UC-50 went missing after 7 January 1918 while sailing for the Bay of Biscay.

== Design ==
A Type UC II submarine, UC-50 had a displacement of 434 tonnes (427 long tons) when at the surface and 511 tonnes (503 long tons) while submerged. She had a length overall of 52.69 m (172 ft 10 in), a beam of 5.22 m (17 ft 2 in), and a draught of 3.64 m (11 ft 11 in). The submarine was powered by two six-cylinder four-stroke diesel engines each producing 290–300 metric horsepower (210–220 kW; 290–300 shp) (a total of 580–600 metric horsepower (430–440 kW; 570–590 shp)), two electric motors producing 620 metric horsepower (460 kW; 610 shp), and two propeller shafts. She had a dive time of 48 seconds and was capable of operating at a depth of 50 metres (160 ft).

The submarine had a maximum surface speed of 11.8 knots (21.9 km/h; 13.6 mph) and a submerged speed of 7.2 knots (13.3 km/h; 8.3 mph). When submerged, she could operate for 56 nautical miles (104 km; 64 mi) at 4 knots (7.4 km/h; 4.6 mph); when surfaced, she could travel 8,820 to 9,450 nautical miles (16,330 to 17,500 km; 10,150 to 10,870 mi) at 7 knots (13 km/h; 8.1 mph). UC-50 was fitted with six 100 centimetres (39 in) mine tubes, eighteen UC 200 mines, three 50 centimetres (20 in) torpedo tubes (one on the stern and two on the bow), seven torpedoes, and one 8.8 cm (3.5 in) Uk L/30 deck gun. Her complement was twenty-six crew members.

=== Previously recorded fate ===
UC-50 was thought to have been rammed and depth charged by HMS Zubian, but this attack actually damaged the UC-79.

== Summary of raiding history ==
| Date | Name | Nationality | Tonnage (Note: Merchant ship tonnages are in gross register tons. Military vessels are listed by tons displacement.) | Fate |
|---|---|---|---|---|
| 13 March 1917 | La Campine | Netherlands | 2,557 | Sunk |
| 16 March 1917 | Gudbrand | Norway | 1,860 | Sunk |
| 17 March 1917 | Caledonia | United Kingdom | 161 | Sunk |
| 17 March 1917 | Expedit | Norway | 680 | Sunk |
| 17 March 1917 | Gowan | United Kingdom | 25 | Sunk |
| 17 March 1917 | Kestrel | United Kingdom | 181 | Sunk |
| 20 March 1917 | Frisk | Norway | 1,038 | Sunk |
| 22 March 1917 | Rio Colorado | United Kingdom | 3,565 | Sunk |
| 14 April 1917 | Venus | Norway | 725 | Sunk |
| 18 April 1917 | Witham | United Kingdom | 144 | Sunk |
| 20 April 1917 | HMT Ruthin Castle | Royal Navy | 275 | Sunk |
| 24 April 1917 | HMT Margate | Royal Navy | 162 | Sunk |
| 24 April 1917 | Mayfly | United Kingdom | 199 | Sunk |
| 24 April 1917 | HMT Gaul | Royal Navy | 270 | Damaged |
| 26 April 1917 | Active | United Kingdom | 149 | Sunk |
| 26 April 1917 | Telefon | Norway | 777 | Sunk |
| 27 May 1917 | Dartmoor | United Kingdom | 2,870 | Sunk |
| 30 May 1917 | HMT Ina William | Royal Navy | 337 | Sunk |
| 26 July 1917 | Carmarthen | United Kingdom | 4,262 | Sunk |
| 3 September 1917 | La Negra | United Kingdom | 8,312 | Sunk |
| 5 September 1917 | Emma | United Kingdom | 73 | Sunk |
| 5 September 1917 | Florence Muspratt | United Kingdom | 79 | Sunk |
| 5 September 1917 | Frances | United Kingdom | 89 | Sunk |
| 5 September 1917 | Theodor | United Kingdom | 230 | Sunk |
| 6 September 1917 | Alesia | France | 6,006 | Sunk |
| 7 September 1917 | Versailles | France | 70 | Sunk |
| 26 September 1917 | HMD Ocean Star | Royal Navy | 92 | Sunk |
| 11 October 1917 | Baychattan | United Kingdom | 3,758 | Sunk |
| 11 October 1917 | Mira | United Kingdom | 3,700 | Sunk |
| 12 December 1917 | Emlyndene | United Kingdom | 495 | Sunk |
