= SM UC-51 =

German minelaying submarine

History

German Empire
- Name: UC-51
- Ordered: 12 January 1916
- Builder: Germaniawerft, Kiel
- Yard number: 267
- Launched: 5 December 1916
- Commissioned: 6 January 1917
- Fate: Sunk by mine, 17 November 1917

General characteristics
- Class & type: Type UC II submarine
- Displacement: 434 t (427 long tons), surfaced; 511 t (503 long tons), submerged
- Length: 52.69 m (172 ft 10 in) o/a; 40.96 m (134 ft 5 in) pressure hull
- Beam: 5.22 m (17 ft 2 in) o/a; 3.65 m (12 ft) pressure hull
- Draught: 3.64 m (11 ft 11 in)
- Propulsion: 2 × propeller shafts; 2 × 6-cylinder, 4-stroke diesel engines, 580–600 PS (430–440 kW; 570–590 shp); 2 × electric motors, 620 PS (460 kW; 610 shp)
- Speed: 11.8 knots (21.9 km/h; 13.6 mph), surfaced; 7.2 knots (13.3 km/h; 8.3 mph), submerged
- Range: 8,820–9,450 nmi (16,330–17,500 km; 10,150–10,870 mi) at 7 knots (13 km/h; 8.1 mph) surfaced; 56 nmi (104 km; 64 mi) at 4 knots (7.4 km/h; 4.6 mph) submerged
- Test depth: 50 m (160 ft)
- Complement: 26
- Armament: 6 × 100 cm (39.4 in) mine tubes; 18 × UC 200 mines; 3 × 50 cm (19.7 in) torpedo tubes (2 bow/external; one stern); 7 × torpedoes; 1 × 8.8 cm (3.5 in) Uk L/30 deck gun
- Notes: 30-second diving time

Service record
- Part of: I Flotilla; 8 April – 20 August 1917; Flandern Flotilla; 20 August 1917 – 17 November 1917
- Commanders: Kptlt. Wilhelm Schröder; 6 January – 28 April 1917; Oblt.z.S. Hans Galster; 29 April – 17 November 1917
- Operations: 7 patrols
- Victories: 27 merchant ships sunk (31,756 GRT); 1 auxiliary warship sunk (81 GRT); 2 merchant ships damaged (5,855 GRT)

SM UC-51 was a German Type UC II minelaying submarine or U-boat in the German Imperial Navy (German: Kaiserliche Marine) during World War I. The U-boat was ordered on 20 November 1915 and was launched on 5 December 1916. She was commissioned into the German Imperial Navy on 6 January 1917 as SM UC-51. (Note: "SM" stands for "Seiner Majestät" (English: His Majesty's) and combined with the U for Unterseeboot would be translated as His Majesty's Submarine.) In seven patrols UC-51 was credited with sinking 28 ships, either by torpedo or by mines laid. UC-51 was mined and sunk in the English Channel on 17 November 1917.

The wreck was located and identified by marine archaeologist Innes McCartney close to the official sinking position in 2001.

== Design ==
A Type UC II submarine, UC-51 had a displacement of 434 tonnes (427 long tons) when at the surface and 511 tonnes (503 long tons) while submerged. She had a length overall of 52.69 m (172 ft 10 in), a beam of 5.22 m (17 ft 2 in), and a draught of 3.64 m (11 ft 11 in). The submarine was powered by two six-cylinder four-stroke diesel engines each producing 290–300 metric horsepower (210–220 kW; 290–300 shp) (a total of 580–600 metric horsepower (430–440 kW; 570–590 shp)), two electric motors producing 620 metric horsepower (460 kW; 610 shp), and two propeller shafts. She had a dive time of 48 seconds and was capable of operating at a depth of 50 metres (160 ft).

The submarine had a maximum surface speed of 11.8 knots (21.9 km/h; 13.6 mph) and a submerged speed of 7.2 knots (13.3 km/h; 8.3 mph). When submerged, she could operate for 56 nautical miles (104 km; 64 mi) at 4 knots (7.4 km/h; 4.6 mph); when surfaced, she could travel 8,820 to 9,450 nautical miles (16,330 to 17,500 km; 10,150 to 10,870 mi) at 7 knots (13 km/h; 8.1 mph). UC-51 was fitted with six 100 centimetres (39 in) mine tubes, eighteen UC 200 mines, three 50 centimetres (20 in) torpedo tubes (one on the stern and two on the bow), seven torpedoes, and one 8.8 cm (3.5 in) Uk L/30 deck gun. Her complement was twenty-six crew members.

== Summary of raiding history ==
Date	Name	Nationality	Tonnage (Note: Merchant ship tonnages are in gross register tons. Military vessels are listed by tons displacement.)	Fate
16 April 1917	Amanda	Sweden	232	Sunk
16 April 1917	Polycarp	Norway	509	Sunk
17 April 1917	Atalanta	Sweden	1,091	Damaged
4 May 1917	Marie	Denmark	772	Sunk
5 May 1917	Segovia	Norway	1,394	Sunk
18 June 1917	Kangaroo	United Kingdom	84	Sunk
18 June 1917	Violet	United Kingdom	158	Sunk
22 June 1917	Miami	United Kingdom	3,762	Sunk
24 June 1917	Hilversum	Netherlands	1,505	Sunk
26 July 1917	Ludgate	United Kingdom	3,708	Sunk
11 August 1917	Gloriosa	United Kingdom	23	Sunk
12 August 1917	Eleazar	United Kingdom	111	Sunk
14 August 1917	N. Verberckmoens	France	1,353	Sunk
14 August 1917	Wisbech	United Kingdom	1,282	Sunk
8 September 1917	Ezel	United Kingdom	163	Sunk
8 September 1917	Laura	United Kingdom	104	Sunk
10 September 1917	Jane Williamson	United Kingdom	197	Sunk
10 September 1917	Mary Orr	United Kingdom	91	Sunk
10 September 1917	Mary Seymour	United Kingdom	150	Sunk
10 September 1917	Moss Rose	United Kingdom	161	Sunk
10 September 1917	Water Lily	United Kingdom	111	Sunk
11 September 1917	Luxembourg	United Kingdom	1,417	Sunk
11 September 1917	Rosy Cross	United Kingdom	25	Sunk
11 September 1917	William	United Kingdom	78	Sunk
14 September 1917	Zeta	United Kingdom	2,269	Sunk
15 September 1917	Saint Jacques	France	2,459	Sunk
9 October 1917	Poldown	United Kingdom	1,370	Sunk
15 October 1917	HMD Active III	Royal Navy	81	Sunk
20 October 1917	Ionian	United Kingdom	8,268	Sunk
17 November 1917	David Lloyd George	United Kingdom	4,764	Damaged
