= SM UB-62 =

- UB-148 at sea, a U-boat similar to UB-62.

History

German Empire
- Name: UB-62
- Ordered: 20 May 1916
- Builder: AG Vulcan, Hamburg
- Cost: 3,279,000 German Papiermark
- Yard number: 87
- Launched: 11 May 1917
- Commissioned: 9 July 1917
- Fate: Surrendered 21 November 1918, broken up in Swansea in 1921

General characteristics
- Class & type: Type UB III submarine
- Displacement: 508 t (500 long tons) surfaced; 639 t (629 long tons) submerged
- Length: 55.52 m (182 ft 2 in) (o/a)
- Beam: 5.76 m (18 ft 11 in)
- Draught: 3.70 m (12 ft 2 in)
- Propulsion: 2 × propeller shaft; 2 × MAN four-stroke 6-cylinder diesel engines, 1,085 bhp (809 kW); 2 × Siemens-Schuckert electric motors, 780 shp (580 kW)
- Speed: 13.3 knots (24.6 km/h; 15.3 mph) surfaced; 7.8 knots (14.4 km/h; 9.0 mph) submerged
- Range: 8,420 nmi (15,590 km; 9,690 mi) at 6 knots (11 km/h; 6.9 mph) surfaced; 55 nmi (102 km; 63 mi) at 4 knots (7.4 km/h; 4.6 mph) submerged
- Test depth: 50 m (160 ft)
- Complement: 3 officers, 31 men
- Armament: 5 × 50 cm (19.7 in) torpedo tubes (4 bow, 1 stern); 10 torpedoes; 1 × 8.8 cm (3.46 in) deck gun

Service record
- Part of: V Flotilla; 24 August 1917 – 20 April 1918; II Flotilla; 20 April – 11 November 1918
- Commanders: Kptlt. Bernhard Putzier; 9 July 1917 – 8 July 1918; Oblt.z.S. Günther Sperling; 9 July – 11 November 1918
- Operations: 7 patrols
- Victories: 8 merchant ships sunk (17,226 GRT); 1 merchant ship damaged (7,300 GRT)

SM UB-62 was a German Type UB III submarine or U-boat in the German Imperial Navy (German: Kaiserliche Marine) during World War I. She was commissioned into the German Imperial Navy on 9 July 1917 as SM UB-62. (Note: "SM" stands for "Seiner Majestät" (English: His Majesty's) and combined with the U for Unterseeboot would be translated as His Majesty's Submarine.)

UB-62 was surrendered 21 November 1918 in accordance with the requirements of the Armistice with Germany and broken up in Swansea in 1921.

== Construction ==
UB-62 was ordered by the GIN on 20 May 1916.

She was built by AG Vulcan of Hamburg and following just under a year of construction, launched at Hamburg on 11 May 1917. UB-62 was commissioned later that same year. Like all Type UB III submarines, UB-62 carried 10 torpedoes and was armed with a 8.8 cm (3.46 in) deck gun. UB-62 would carry a crew of up to 3 officer and 31 men and had a cruising range of 8,420 nautical miles (15,590 km; 9,690 mi). UB-62 had a displacement of 508 t (500 long tons) while surfaced and 639 t (629 long tons) when submerged. Her engines enabled her to travel at 13.3 knots (24.6 km/h; 15.3 mph) when surfaced and 8 knots (15 km/h; 9.2 mph) when submerged.

== Summary of raiding history ==
Date	Name	Nationality	Tonnage (Note: Tonnages are in gross register tons)	Fate
6 September 1917	Hammar II	Sweden	206	Sunk
17 September 1917	Australia	Russian Empire	3,592	Sunk
17 September 1917	Queen Amelia	United Kingdom	4,278	Sunk
18 September 1917	Joseph Chamberlain	United Kingdom	3,709	Sunk
6 November 1917	Benor	Russian Empire	394	Sunk
14 January 1918	Alster	United Kingdom	964	Sunk
12 March 1918	Oswin	Sweden	1,743	Sunk
19 March 1918	Burnstone	United Kingdom	2,340	Sunk
25 July 1918	Indore	United Kingdom	7,300	Damaged

== Bibliography ==
- Bendert, Harald (2000). Die UB-Boote der Kaiserlichen Marine, 1914-1918. Einsätze, Erfolge, Schicksal (in German). Hamburg: Verlag E.S. Mittler & Sohn GmbH. ISBN 3-8132-0713-7.
- Gröner, Erich; Jung, Dieter; Maass, Martin (1991). U-boats and Mine Warfare Vessels. German Warships 1815–1945. Vol. 2. Translated by Thomas, Keith; Magowan, Rachel. London: Conway Maritime Press. ISBN 0-85177-593-4.
- Rössler, Eberhard (1979). Die deutschen U-Boote und ihre Werften: eine Bilddokumentation über den deutschen U-Bootbau; in zwei Bänden (in German). Vol. I. Munich: Bernard & Graefe. ISBN 3-7637-5213-7.
