= Small nucleolar RNA SNORD48 =

Non-coding RNA molecule

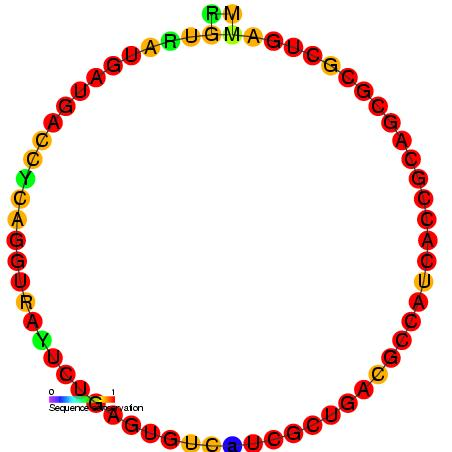
- Predicted secondary structure and sequence conservation of SNORD48

Identifiers
- Symbol: SNORD48
- Alt. Symbols: U48
- Rfam: RF00282

Other data
- RNA type: Gene; snRNA; snoRNA; C/D-box
- Domain: Eukaryota
- GO: GO:0006396 GO:0005730
- SO: SO:0000593
- PDB structures: PDBe

In molecular biology, SNORD48 (also known as U48) is a non-coding RNA (ncRNA) molecule which functions in the modification of other small nuclear RNAs (snRNAs). This type of modifying RNA is usually located in the nucleolus of the eukaryotic cell which is a major site of snRNA biogenesis. It is known as a small nucleolar RNA (snoRNA) and also often referred to as a guide RNA.

U48 belongs to the C/D box class of snoRNAs which contain the conserved sequence motifs known as the C box (UGAUGA) and the D box (CUGA). Most of the members of the box C/D family function in directing site-specific 2'-O-methylation of substrate RNAs.

This snoRNA was originally cloned from HeLa cells and experimentally verified by northern blotting. SNORD48 is predicted to guide the 2'O-ribose methylation of 28S rRNA C2279. In the human genome this snoRNA is located in the introns of the same host gene (C6orf48) as another C/D box snoRNA U52 (also known as SNORD52).
