= List of shipwrecks in September 1917 =

The list of shipwrecks in September 1917 includes ships sunk, foundered, grounded, or otherwise lost during September 1917.

== 1 September ==
List of shipwrecks: 1 September 1917
Ship	State	Description
SMS Admiral Von Schroder	Imperial German Navy	World War I: The Greta-class Vorpostenboot was beached after being damaged by Royal Navy destroyers off Blaavandshuk.
Akaroa	Norway	World War I: The barque was sunk in the English Channel 70 nautical miles (130 km) west of the Casquets, Channel Islands by SM U-19 (Imperial German Navy). Her crew survived.
Amiral Olry	France	World War I: The cargo ship was torpedoed and sunk in the Mediterranean Sea 38 nautical miles (70 km) north west of Cape Sidero, Crete, Greece (35°40′N 25°47′E) by SM UC-74 (Imperial German Navy).
SMS Crefeld	Imperial German Navy	The Vorpostenboot was lost on this date.
Dront	Russia	World War I: The cargo ship was sunk in the Barents Sea 110 nautical miles (200 km) north west by north of the North Cape, Norway by SM U-28 (Imperial German Navy).
Erato	United Kingdom	World War I: The cargo ship struck a mine and sank in the English Channel 4 nautical miles (7.4 km) south east of The Lizard, Cornwall. Her crew survived.
Fingal	United Kingdom	The cargo ship foundered on this date.
SMS Heinrich Bruns	Imperial German Navy	The Vorpostenboot was lost on this date.
Peronne	France	World War I: The cargo ship was sunk in the English Channel 5 nautical miles (9.3 km) south east of Berry Head, Devon, United Kingdom by SM UC-65 (Imperial German Navy). Her crew survived.
SMS Rinteln	Imperial German Navy	World War I: The Hameln-class Vorpostenboot was beached after being damaged by Royal Navy destroyers off Lyngvig.
Tarapaca	France	World War I: The four-masted full-rigged ship was scuttled in the Bay of Biscay 65 nautical miles (120 km) west of the La Coubre Lighthouse, Charente-Maritime (45°55′N 3°12′W) by SM U-52 (Imperial German Navy).

== 2 September ==
List of shipwrecks: 2 September 1917
Ship	State	Description
Caracas	Norway	World War I: The auxiliary sailing vessel was scuttled in the Atlantic Ocean 130 nautical miles (240 km) north west of Cape Finisterre, Spain (46°00′N 11°04′W) by SM UB-49 (Imperial German Navy). Her crew survived.
HMS Dundee	Royal Navy	World War I: The armed boarding steamer was torpedoed and damaged in the Atlantic Ocean south west of the Isles of Scilly (48°50′N 9°20′W) by SM UC-49 (Imperial German Navy) with the loss of nine lives. She sank the next day.
Ker Durand	France	World War I: The fishing vessel was scuttled in the Atlantic Ocean 70 nautical miles (130 km) west of Ar Men, Finistère by SM UC-69 (Imperial German Navy). Her crew survived.
Olive Branch	United Kingdom	World War I: The cargo ship was shelled and sunk in the Barents Sea 85 nautical miles (157 km) north by east of the North Cape, Norway (72°34′N 27°56′E) by SM U-28 (Imperial German Navy) with the loss of a crew member.
Rytonhall	United Kingdom	World War I: The cargo ship was torpedoed and sunk in the Atlantic Ocean 105 nautical miles (194 km) west of Ouessant, Finistère (47°45′N 7°28′W) by SM UC-69 (Imperial German Navy). Her crew survived.
SM U-28	Imperial German Navy	World War I: The Type U 27 submarine was sunk in the Barents Sea 85 nautical miles (157 km) north by east of the North Cape (72°34′N 27°56′E) by the explosion of the cargo of munitions aboard Olive Branch, (United Kingdom) which it had attacked. All 39 crew were killed.
Wentworth	United Kingdom	World War I: The cargo ship was torpedoed and sunk in the Bay of Biscay 36 nautical miles (67 km) (47°00′N 3°23′W) by SM U-52 (Imperial German Navy) with the loss of a crew member. Three survivors were taken as prisoners of war.

== 3 September ==
List of shipwrecks: 3 September 1917
Ship	State	Description
Agios Andreas	Greece	World War I: The sailing vessel was sunk in the Aegean Sea by SM UC-74 (Imperial German Navy).
Alentejo	Portugal	The cargo ship caught fire, exploded and sank at Marseille, Bouches-du-Rhône, France.
HMS Begonia	Royal Navy	World War I: The Azalea-class sloop departed on patrol in the Atlantic Ocean. She was subsequently sunk by enemy action with the loss of 94 crew.
HMT Italy	Royal Navy	The naval trawler was lost on this date.
La Negra	United Kingdom	World War I: The cargo ship was torpedoed and sunk in the English Channel 50 nautical miles (93 km) south south west of Start Point, Devon (49°29′N 3°53′W) by SM UC-50 (Imperial German Navy) with the loss of four of her crew.
Majoren	Norway	World War I: The cargo ship was sunk in the Atlantic Ocean north west of Bloody Foreland, County Donegal, United Kingdom (55°14′N 8°56′W) by SM U-95 (Imperial German Navy). Her crew survived.
Ragnhild	United Kingdom	World War I: The cargo ship was torpedoed and sunk in the North Sea 14 nautical miles (26 km) south by east of Flamborough Head, East Riding of Yorkshire by SM UB-30 (Imperial German Navy) with the loss of fifteen crew.
Treverbyn	United Kingdom	World War I: The cargo ship struck a mine and sank in the Atlantic Ocean 2 nautical miles (3.7 km) east south east of the Ushinish Lighthouse, South Uist, Outer Hebrides with the loss of 27 crew.
Van Allens-Broughton	United States	The five-masted schooner was abandoned in the Atlantic Ocean. She sank the next day.

== 4 September ==
List of shipwrecks: 4 September 1917
Ship	State	Description
Bishopton	United Kingdom	World War I: The cargo ship was torpedoed and sunk in the English Channel 30 nautical miles (56 km) south by east of St. Catherine's Point, Isle of Wight (50°08′N 0°57′W) by SM UC-16 (Imperial German Navy) with the loss of two of her crew.
Peerless	United Kingdom	World War I: The cargo ship was torpedoed and sunk in the Atlantic Ocean south west of the Bishop Rock, Isles of Scilly (49°11′N 7°16′W) by SM U-52 (Imperial German Navy) with the loss of five crew. Three survivors were taken as prisoners of war.
Sadi Carnot	France	World War I: The three-masted schooner was sunk in the Atlantic Ocean 42 nautical miles (78 km) south south west of the Isles of Scilly by SM UC-69 (Imperial German Navy). Her crew were rescued by HMS Landrail (Royal Navy) and Montana (United States).
Theodora	Greece	World War I: The cargo ship was sunk in the Atlantic Ocean off Santa Uxía de Ribeira, A Coruña, Spain (42°32′N 9°25′W) by SM UB-49 (Imperial German Navy). Her crew survived.

== 5 September ==
List of shipwrecks: 5 September 1917
Ship	State	Description
Alesia	France	World War I: The passenger ship was torpedoed and damaged in the Atlantic Ocean 40 nautical miles (74 km) north west of Ouessant, Finistère by SM UC-69 (Imperial German Navy). She was sunk the next day by SM UC-50 (Imperial German Navy).
Echunga	United Kingdom	World War I: The tanker was torpedoed and sunk in the Atlantic Ocean 40 nautical miles (74 km) north east of Ouessant by SM U-52 (Imperial German Navy) with the loss of nine crew.
Emma	United Kingdom	World War I: The sailing vessel was shelled and sunk in the English Channel 8 nautical miles (15 km) north of Sept-Îles, Finistère, France by SM UC-50 (Imperial German Navy).
HMT Eros	Royal Navy	World War I: The naval trawler struck a mine and sank in the North Sea off Orfordness, Suffolk with the loss of two of her crew.
Florence Muspratt	United Kingdom	World War I: The schooner was shelled and sunk in the English Channel 10 nautical miles (19 km) north of Sept-Îles by SM UC-50 (Imperial German Navy). Her crew survived.
Frances	United Kingdom	World War I: The ketch was scuttled in the English Channel 8 nautical miles (15 km) north by west of Sept-Îles by SM UC-50 (Imperial German Navy). Her crew survived.
Glynn	United Kingdom	World War I: The schooner was shelled and sunk in the English Channel 32 nautical miles (59 km) north west of the Les Hanois Lighthouse, Guernsey, Channel Islands by SM UC-42 (Imperial German Navy). Her crew survived.
Industry	United Kingdom	World War I: The schooner was shelled and sunk in the English Chaanel 20 nautical miles (37 km) north west of the Les Hanois Lighthouse by SM UC-42 (Imperial German Navy). Her crew survived.
Jeannot	Belgium	World War I: The fishing vessel was scuttled in the North Sea off Lowestoft, Suffolk by SM UB-10 (Imperial German Navy). Her crew survived.
Kansas City	United Kingdom	The cargo ship disappeared in a storm.
Margaret	United Kingdom	World War I: The trawler struck a mine and sank in the North Sea off Wick, Caithness with the loss of five of her crew.
Proletaire	France	World War I: The sailing vessel was scuttled in the Mediterranean Sea 59 nautical miles (109 km) off Cape Bougarouni, Algeria (37°45′N 5°45′E) by SM U-63 (Imperial German Navy).
SMS Senator Holthusen	Imperial German Navy	The Vorpostenboot was lost on this date.
Theodor	United Kingdom	World War I: The sailing vessel was scuttled in the English Channel 13 nautical miles (24 km) north by west of Sept-Îles by SM UC-50 (Imperial German Navy). Her crew survived.
SM U-88	Imperial German Navy	World War I: The Type U 87 submarine struck a mine and sank in the North Sea off Terschelling, Friesland, Netherlands with the loss of all 43 crew.
Unity	United Kingdom	World War I: The fishing smack was scuttled in the North Sea 8 nautical miles (15 km) east of the Cross Sand Lightship (United Kingdom) by SM UB-10 (Imperial German Navy). Her crew survived.

== 6 September ==
List of shipwrecks: 6 September 1917
Ship	State	Description
Agios Georgios	Greece	World War I: The barque was sunk in the Ionian Sea (36°15′N 21°44′E) by SM UC-74 (Imperial German Navy).
Elisabethville	Belgium	Elisabethville World War I: The passenger ship was torpedoed and sunk in the Bay of Biscay (47°05′N 3°04′W) by UC-71 (Imperial German Navy) with the loss of fourteen of the 313 people on board.
HMS Fiona	Royal Navy	The armed boarding steamer ran aground on the Pentland Skerries. She was towed off but broke in two.
Hammar II	Sweden	World War I: The cargo ship was scuttled in the North Sea by SM UB-62 (Imperial German Navy). Her eleven crew took to the lifeboats but were not rescued.
HMT Helgian	Royal Navy	World War I: The naval trawler struck a mine and sank in the Gulf of Ruphani with the loss of ten of her twelve crew.
Moina	France	World War I: The auxiliary sailing vessel was scuttled in the Atlantic Ocean west of Gibraltar (36°32′N 7°15′W) by SM UB-49 (Imperial German Navy). Her crew survived.
Rosary	United Kingdom	World War I: The fishing smack was scuttled in the North Sea off the coast of Norfolk by SM UB-10 (Imperial German Navy). Her crew survived.
Thisbe	France	World War I: The cargo ship was torpedoed and sunk in the Atlantic Ocean 6 nautical miles (11 km) west of The Lizard, Cornwall, United Kingdom (49°57′N 5°21′W) by SM UB-35 (Imperial German Navy).
Tuskar	United Kingdom	World War I: The cargo ship struck a mine and sank in the Atlantic Ocean 3 nautical miles (5.6 km) off Eagle Island, County Mayo with the loss of ten of her crew.
Ville de Strasbourg	France	World War I: The cargo ship was sunk in the Aegean Sea off Cape Spati, Cythera, Greece (36°24′N 22°54′E) by SM UC-74 (Imperial German Navy). Her crew survived.

== 7 September ==
List of shipwrecks: 7 September 1917
Ship	State	Description
Antonio Ferro	Russia	The tug foundered on this date with the loss of seven of her crew.
HMT By George	Royal Navy	World War I: The naval trawler struck a mine and sank in the Gulf of Ruphani (40°38′N 24°54′E) with the loss of two of her crew.
Casa Blanca	Portugal	World War I: The sailing vessel was sunk in the Atlantic Ocean by SM UB-49 (Imperial German Navy).
Clan Ferguson	United Kingdom	World War I: The collier was torpedoed and sunk in the Atlantic Ocean 15 nautical miles (28 km) off Cape Spartel, Morocco (35°50′N 6°10′W) by SM UB-49 (Imperial German Navy) with the loss of ten crew.
Grelfryda	United Kingdom	World War I: The cargo ship was torpedoed and damaged in the North Sea 4 nautical miles (7.4 km) south west by west of Flamborough Head, Yorkshire by SM UB-34 (Imperial German Navy). She was beached, but was later refloated, repaired and returned to service.
Haakon VII	Norway	World War I: The cargo ship was torpedoed and sunk in the Atlantic Ocean 3 nautical miles (5.6 km) east south east of Land's End, Cornwall, United Kingdom by SM UB-35 (Imperial German Navy) with the loss of three of her crew.
Hinemoa	United Kingdom	World War I: The four-masted barque was shelled and sunk in the Atlantic Ocean 35 nautical miles (65 km) west south west of the Bishop Rock, Isles of Scilly (49°30′N 7°08′W) by SM UC-16 (Imperial German Navy). Her crew survived.
Hunsbridge	United Kingdom	World War I: The collier was torpedoed and sunk in the Atlantic Ocean 60 nautical miles (110 km) west south west of Cape Spartel (35°10′N 6°50′W) by SM UB-49 (Imperial German Navy) with the loss of three of her crew.
Minnehaha	United Kingdom	World War I: The ocean liner was torpedoed and sunk in the Atlantic Ocean 12 nautical miles (22 km) south east of the Fastnet Rock (51°17′N 9°22′W) by SM U-48 (Imperial German Navy) with the loss of 43 lives.
Mont de Piete	France	World War I: The vessel was sunk in the Bay of Biscay off the mouth of the Loire by SM UC-71 (Imperial German Navy).
Myrmidon	United Kingdom	World War I: The cargo ship was damaged in the Mediterranean Sea (37°10′N 6°51′E by SM UC-54 (Imperial German Navy) with the loss of two of her crew. She was beached at Philippeville, Algeria but was later refloated.
Versailles	France	World War I: The fishing vessel was shelled and sunk in the Atlantic Ocean 107 nautical miles (198 km) south by west of Ouessant, Finistère (47°49′N 7°38′W) by SM UC-50 (Imperial German Navy). Her crew survived.
Vestfjeld	Norway	World War I: The four-masted barque was sunk in the Atlantic Ocean 40 nautical miles (74 km) south west of the Bishop Rock by SM UC-16 (Imperial German Navy). Her crew survived.

== 8 September ==
List of shipwrecks: 8 September 1917
Ship	State	Description
Aladdin	Norway	World War I: The coaster was sunk in the North Sea 5 nautical miles (9.3 km) north by west of Flamborough Head, Yorkshire, United Kingdom by SM UB-34 (Imperial German Navy) with the loss of a crew member.
Armorique	France	World War I: The sailing vessel was sunk in the Atlantic Ocean north of Ouessant, Finistère by SM UB-35 (Imperial German Navy).
Askelad	Norway	World War I: The cargo ship was sunk in the Atlantic Ocean west south west of Ouessant (47°25′N 7°25′W) by SM UC-17 (Imperial German Navy). Her crew survived.
Blanche	France	World War I: The schooner was sunk in the Atlantic Ocean north of Ouessant by SM UB-35 (Imperial German Navy).
Elizabeth	United Kingdom	World War I: The schooner was scuttled in the English Channel 12 nautical miles (22 km) east south east of Start Point, Devon by SM UB-31 (Imperial German Navy). Her crew survived.
Ezel	United Kingdom	World War I: The schooner was shelled and sunk in the English Channel 20 nautical miles (37 km) north of Saint-Valery-en-Caux, Seine-Inférieure, France (50°13′N 0°36′E) by SM UC-51 (Imperial German Navy). Her crew survived.
Family's Pride	United Kingdom	World War I: The vessel was scuttled in the North Sea 28 nautical miles (52 km) east of Peterhead, Aberdeenshire by SM UC-40 (Imperial German Navy).
Harrow	United Kingdom	World War I: The cargo ship was torpedoed and sunk in the North Sea 4 nautical miles (7.4 km) south east of Whitby, Yorkshire by SM UB-41 (Imperial German Navy) with the loss of two of her crew.
Hockwold	United Kingdom	The collier collided with another British merchant ship and sank in the English Channel off The Lizard, Cornwall.
Laura	United Kingdom	World War I: The ketch was scuttled in the English Channel 25 nautical miles (46 km) north of Fécamp, Seine-Inférieure by SM UC-51 (Imperial German Navy). Her crew survived.
Lighter No. 2	United States	The Lighter sank at the wharf of Burton-Furber Coal Company, East Boston, Massachusetts.
Meeta	Russia	World War I: The schooner was sunk in the Atlantic Ocean north of Ouessant by SM UB-35 (Imperial German Navy).
Newholm	United Kingdom	World War I: The cargo ship was sunk in the English Channel 1 nautical mile (1.9 km) south of Start Point, Devon after striking a mine laid by SM UC-31 (Imperial German Navy) with the loss of twenty of her crew. Nine others were rescued, one by Ella Trout and her cousin.
Setubal	Norway	World War I: The cargo ship was scuttled in the English Channel 25 nautical miles (46 km) north-east of Ouessant (48°55′N 4°35′W) by SM UC-71 (Imperial German Navy). Her crew survived.
William H. Clifford	United States	World War I: The four-masted schooner was captured and scuttled sunk in the Atlantic Ocean (48°30′N 12°20′W) by SM UB-50 (Imperial German Navy). Her crew survived.

== 9 September ==
List of shipwrecks: 9 September 1917
Ship	State	Description
Elsa	Denmark	World War I: The barque was torpedoed and sunk in the Atlantic Ocean 6 nautical miles (11 km) off Kinsale, County Cork, United Kingdom by SM U-48 (Imperial German Navy) with the loss of five crew.
Montana	United States	The steamer sank in the Mediterranean Sea between Tunis, French Tunisia, and Malta.
Pluton	Norway	World War I: The cargo ship was torpedoed and sunk in the English Channel 6 nautical miles (11 km) east south east of Start Point, Devon by SM UB-31 (Imperial German Navy) with the loss of ten of her crew.
Storm	United Kingdom	World War I: The coaster was torpedoed and sunk in the North Sea 1 nautical mile (1.9 km) off the Sunk Lightship (United Kingdom) by a Luftstreitkräfte aircraft.
Swiftsure	United Kingdom	World War I: The coaster struck a mine and sank in Shapinsay Sound, Orkney Islands with the loss of a crew member.

== 10 September ==
List of shipwrecks: 10 September 1917
Ship	State	Description
City of Nagpur	United Kingdom	The cargo ship ran aground on the Danae Shoal, off Lourenço Marques, Mozambique. She broke in two and was a total loss. All 259 passengers, and her crew, were rescued.
Eburoon	Belgium	The cargo ship was wrecked in Trepassey Bay, Newfoundland.
Jane Williamson	United Kingdom	World War I: The brigantine was shelled and sunk in the Atlantic Ocean 20 nautical miles (37 km) north of St. Ives, Cornwall (50°32′N 5°20′W) by SM UC-51 (Imperial German Navy) with the loss of four of her six crew.
HMT Loch Ard	Royal Navy	World War I: The naval trawler struck a mine and sank in the North Sea off Lowestoft, Suffolk (52°30′N 1°53′E) with the loss of five of her crew.
Margarita	United Kingdom	World War I: The cargo ship struck a mine and was severely damaged in the North Sea 1 nautical mile (1.9 km) south of the Bressay Lighthouse, Shetland Islands. She was repaired and returned to service in 1921.
Mary Orr	United Kingdom	World War I: The sailing vessel was shelled and sunk in the Atlantic Ocean 8 nautical miles (15 km) north by east of the Pendeen Lighthouse, Cornwall (50°18′N 5°40′W) by SM UC-51 (Imperial German Navy). Her crew survived.
Mary Seymour	United Kingdom	World War I: The schooner was shelled and sunk in the Atlantic Ocean 7 nautical miles (13 km) north north east of the Pendeen Lighthouse (50°16′N 5°39′W) by SM UC-51 (Imperial German Navy). Her crew survived.
Moss Rose	United Kingdom	World War I: The three-masted schooner was shelled and sunk in the Atlantic Ocean 7 nautical miles (13 km) north north east of the Pendeen Lighthouse (50°16′N 5°39′W) by SM UC-51 (Imperial German Navy). Her crew survived.
Parkmill	United Kingdom	The cargo ship was sunk in the North Sea 1.25 nautical miles (2.32 km) south east of the Bressay Lighthouse by SM UC-40 (Imperial German Navy). Her crew survived.
Sims	Russia	World War I: The tug struck a mine and sank in the Baltic Sea off Worms Island.
SM UC-42	Imperial German Navy	World War I: The Type UC II submarine was sunk by the explosion of one of her own mines at Cork, Ireland (51°44′N 8°12′W) with the loss of all 26 crew.
Vikholmen	Norway	World War I: The coaster was sunk in the English Channel south east of the Isle of Wight, United Kingdom (50°11′N 1°22′W) by SM UC-71 (Imperial German Navy) with the loss of eight of her crew.
Water Lily	United Kingdom	World War I: The schooner was sunk in the Atlantic Ocean 8 nautical miles (15 km) north north east of the Pendeen Lighthouse (50°18′N 5°40′W) by SM UC-51 (Imperial German Navy). Her crew survived.

== 11 September ==
List of shipwrecks: 11 September 1917
Ship	State	Description
Embleton	United Kingdom	World War I: The cargo ship was sunk in the Atlantic Ocean 150 nautical miles (280 km) west of Cape Spartel, Morocco by SM U-63 (Imperial German Navy). Her crew survived.
Luxembourg	United Kingdom	World War I: The cargo ship struck a mine and sank in the Atlantic Ocean 3.5 nautical miles (6.5 km) north north east of the Pendeen Lighthouse, Cornwall (50°13′N 5°40′W) by SM UC-51 (Imperial German Navy). Her crew survived.
Rosy Cross	United Kingdom	World War I: The fishing smack was scuttled in the Atlantic Ocean 4 nautical miles (7.4 km) north west by west of Crackington Haven, Cornwall by SM UC-51 (Imperial German Navy). Her crew survived.
Tobol	Imperial Russian Navy	World War I: The cargo ship was sunk in the North Sea 70 nautical miles (130 km) east south east of Duncansby Head, Caithness, United Kingdom (58°10′N 1°00′W) by SM U-52 (Imperial German Navy). Wreck located 2024.
SM U-49	Imperial German Navy	World War I: The Type U 43 submarine was rammed, shelled and sunk in the Bay of Biscay (46°17′N 14°42′W) by British Transport (United Kingdom) with the loss of all 43 crew.
Vienna	United Kingdom	World War I: The cargo ship was torpedoed and sunk in the Bay of Biscay 340 nautical miles (630 km) west of Ouessant, Finistère, France (46°59′N 13°05′W) by SM U-49 (Imperial German Navy) with the loss of 25 crew. Her captain was taken as a prisoner of war.
William	United Kingdom	World War I: The schooner was sunk in the Atlantic Ocean 4 nautical miles (7.4 km) north north west of Crackington Haven (50°56′N 5°39′W) by SM UC-51 (Imperial German Navy). Her crew survived.

== 12 September ==
List of shipwrecks: 12 September 1917
Ship	State	Description
Agricola	United Kingdom	World War I: The schooner was scuttled in the Bristol Channel 15 nautical miles (28 km) west north west of Lundy Island, Devon by SM U-19 (Imperial German Navy). Her crew survived.
HMT Asia	Royal Navy	World War I: The naval trawler struck a mine and sank in the North Sea off Bressay, Shetland Islands with the loss of seven of her crew.
Charles Frederick	United States	The Barge sank at the wharf of the Peoples Coal and Wood Company Yard, Bridgeport, Connecticut.
Deputé Pierre Goujon	France	World War I: The cargo ship was sunk in the Bay of Biscay off Belle Île, Morbihan (47°06′N 3°57′W) by SM U-103 (Imperial German Navy). Her crew survived.
Edinorog	Imperial Russian Navy	The Bars-class submarine ran aground off "Ayret Island", in the Baltic Sea. She was refloated on 25 September with assistance from Volkhov (Russia) and taken in to Reval for repairs.
Gibraltar	United Kingdom	World War I: The cargo ship was torpedoed and sunk in the Mediterranean Sea 100 nautical miles (190 km) south east of Cape Creus, Spain (41°17′N 5°50′E) by SM UC-27 (Imperial German Navy) with the loss of four of her crew.
Gisla	Norway	World War I: The cargo ship was sunk in the Mediterranean Sea 4 nautical miles (7.4 km) off Cape Palos, Murcia Spain (37°39′N 0°32′W) by SM U-64 (Imperial German Navy). Her crew survived.
HS 3 and RB 10	United Kingdom	World War I: The tug and refrigerated barge were scuttled in the Atlantic Ocean 18 nautical miles (33 km) west by north of Cape Sines, Portugal by SM UB-50 (Imperial German Navy). Her crew survived, but four of them were taken as prisoners of war.
Reim	Norway	World War I: The cargo ship was sunk in the Atlantic Ocean off Cape St. Vincent, Portugal by SM U-63 (Imperial German Navy). Her crew survived.
St. Margaret	United Kingdom	World War I: The passenger ship was torpedoed and sunk in the Norwegian Sea 30 nautical miles (56 km) south east of Lítla Dímun, Faroe Islands by SM U-103 (Imperial German Navy) with the loss of five crew.
SM U-45	Imperial German Navy	World War I: The Type U 43 submarine was torpedoed and sunk in the Atlantic Ocean north west of the Shetland Islands, United Kingdom (55°48′N 7°30′W) by HMS D7 (Royal Navy) with the loss of 43 of her 45 crew.
Urd	United Kingdom	World War I: The cargo ship was torpedoed and sunk in the Mediterranean Sea 10 nautical miles (19 km) north by east of Cape Palos (37°52′N 0°28′W) by SM U-64 (Imperial German Navy) with the loss of three crew.
Wilmore	United States	World War I: The cargo ship was torpedoed and sunk in the Mediterranean Sea 4 nautical miles (7.4 km) north east of the Hornigas Lighthouse, Cape Palos, Spain (37°41′N 0°31′W) by SM U-64 (Imperial German Navy). Her crew survived.

== 13 September ==
List of shipwrecks: 13 September 1917
Ship	State	Description
Arlequin	Tunisia	World War I: The sailing vessel was sunk in the Gulf of Gabès by SM UC-52 (Imperial German Navy). Her crew survived.
Chère Rose	Tunisia	World War I: The sailing vessel was sunk in the Gulf of Gabès by SM UC-52 (Imperial German Navy).
Comizianes da Graca	Portugal	World War I: The sailing vessel was sunk in the Atlantic Ocean 6 nautical miles (11 km) north of Cape Sines by SM UB-50 (Imperial German Navy).
Correiro de Sines	Portugal	World War I: The sailing vessel was sunk in the Atlantic Ocean off the coast of Portugal by SM UB-50 (Imperial German Navy).
Ortigia	Tunisia	World War I: The sailing vessel was sunk in the Gulf of Gabès by SM UC-52 (Imperial German Navy).
SM UC-21	Imperial German Navy	The Type UC II submarine departed Zeebrugge, West Flanders, Belgium for the Bay of Biscay. No further trace, presumed lost with all 26 crew.
Vittoria	Tunisia	World War I: The sailing vessel was sunk in the Gulf of Gabès by SM UC-52 (Imperial German Navy).

== 14 September ==
List of shipwrecks: 14 September 1917
Ship	State	Description
Amiral de Kersaint	France	World War I: The cargo ship was sunk in the Mediterranean Sea 5 nautical miles (9.3 km) off Cape Tortosa, Spain by SM U-64 (Imperial German Navy).
Ausonia	Italy	World War I: The cargo ship was sunk in the Mediterranean Sea off Cape Tortosa (40°46′N 1°03′E) by SM U-64 (Imperial German Navy). Her crew survived.
Chulmleigh	United Kingdom	World War I: The cargo ship was torpedoed and sunk in the Mediterranean Sea 10 nautical miles (19 km) south west by west of Cape Salou, Spain (40°54′N 1°04′E) by SM U-64 (Imperial German Navy). Her crew survived.
USS D-2	United States Navy	The D-class submarine sprang a leak and sank at New London Naval Base, Connecticut. Her crew survived. She was subsequently refloated, repaired and returned to service.
Logan	United States	The Schooner barge went ashore at South Wellfleet, Massachusetts. Abandoned by owners.
Sado	Portugal	World War I: The ship was sunk in the Atlantic Ocean 15 nautical miles (28 km) south west of Cape Sines by SM UB-50 (Imperial German Navy).
Zeta	United Kingdom	World War I: The cargo ship was torpedoed and sunk in the Atlantic Ocean 8 nautical miles (15 km) south by west of Mine Head, County Cork by SM UC-51 (Imperial German Navy). Her crew survived.

== 15 September ==
List of shipwrecks: 15 September 1917
Ship	State	Description
Dependence	United Kingdom	World War I: The schooner was scuttled in the Atlantic Ocean off The Lizard, Cornwall by SM UB-38 (Imperial German Navy). Her crew survived.
Idomeneus	United Kingdom	World War I: The cargo ship was torpedoed and damaged in the North Channel (56°40′N 10°50′W) by SM U-67 (Imperial German Navy) with the loss of four crew. She was beached but was later refloated.
Platuria	United States	World War I: The tanker was torpedoed and sunk in the Atlantic Ocean off Tangier, Morocco (35°08′N 9°15′W) by SM U-63 (Imperial German Navy) with the loss of ten crew.
Rollesby	United Kingdom	World War I: The cargo ship was torpedoed and sunk in the North Sea 80 nautical miles (150 km) east north east of Muckle Flugga, Shetland Islands by SM U-48 (Imperial German Navy). Her crew survived.
Santaren	United Kingdom	World War I: The cargo ship was torpedoed and sunk in the North Sea 40 nautical miles (74 km) north east of Muckle Flugga (61°36′N 0°14′W) by SM UB-63 (Imperial German Navy). Her crew survived.
Sommeina	United Kingdom	World War I: The cargo ship struck a mine and sank in the Atlantic Ocean 4 nautical miles (7.4 km) south east of The Manacles (50°01′N 4°57′W). Her crew survived.
Saint Jacques	France	World War I: The cargo ship struck a mine and sank in the Irish Sea 5 nautical miles (9.3 km) south west of St. Ann's Head, Pembrokeshire, United Kingdom by SM UC-51 (Imperial German Navy).

== 16 September ==
List of shipwrecks: 16 September 1917
Ship	State	Description
Annina Capano	Italy	World War I: The sailing vessel was sunk in the Gulf of Lion (42°50′N 3°29′E) by SM UC-27 (Imperial German Navy).
Ann J. Trainer	United States	World War I: The sailing vessel was sunk in the Atlantic Ocean 30 nautical miles (56 km) off Ouessant, Finistère, France (48°44′N 5°39′W) by SM UC-21 (Imperial German Navy). Her crew survived.
Arabis	United Kingdom	World War I: The cargo ship was torpedoed and sunk in the Atlantic Ocean 210 nautical miles (390 km) west by south of Ouessant (46°28′N 9°42′W) by SM U-54 (Imperial German Navy) with the loss of twenty crew.
Eendracht VII	Netherlands	World War I: The fishing vessel was scuttled in the North Sea 8 nautical miles (15 km) off IJmuiden, North Holland by SM UC-64 (Imperial German Navy). Her crew survived.
Facto	Norway	World War I: The cargo ship was torpedoed and sunk in Mount's Bay (49°58′N 5°36′W) by SM UB-18 (Imperial German Navy) with the los of two of her crew.
HMS G9	Royal Navy	World War I: The G-class submarine was rammed and sunk at night in the North Sea by HMS Pasley (Royal Navy), after the submarine had mistaken Pasley for a U-boat and fired two torpedoes at her. All but one of her 31 crew were killed; the survivor rescued by HMS Pasley.
Quatre Frères	France	World War I: The fishing vessel was scuttled in the Atlantic Ocean 240 nautical miles (440 km) west of the French coast by SM UC-31 (Imperial German Navy).
Sandsend	United Kingdom	World War I: The collier was torpedoed and sunk in the Atlantic Ocean 6 nautical miles (11 km) south east by east of Mine Head, County Waterford by SM UC-48 (Imperial German Navy) with the loss of three of her crew.

== 17 September ==
List of shipwrecks: 17 September 1917
Ship	State	Description
Australia	Russia	World War I: The cargo ship was sunk in the Atlantic Ocean 35 nautical miles (65 km) north west of Muckle Flugga, Shetland Islands, United Kingdom by SM UB-62 (Imperial German Navy). Her crew survived.
Eugenio D.	Italy	World War I: The sailing vessel was sunk in the Gulf of Lion by SM UC-27 (Imperial German Navy).
Muccio	Italy	World War I: The sailing vessel was sunk in the Gulf of Lion by SM UC-27 (Imperial German Navy).
Niemen	France	World War I: The cargo ship was sunk in the Atlantic Ocean 122 nautical miles (226 km) north west of Cape Ortegal, Spain (45°53′N 8°06′W) by SM U-54 (Imperial German Navy).
Our Bairns	United Kingdom	World War I: The fishing smack was scuttled in Irish Sea 25 nautical miles (46 km) south west of the Coningbeg Lightship (United Kingdom) by SM UC-48 (Imperial German Navy). Her crew survived.
Paraciers	France	World War I: The cargo ship was torpedoed and sunk in the North Sea 12 nautical miles (22 km) north of the Spurn Lightship (United Kingdom) by SM UC-64 (Imperial German Navy). Her crew survived.
Queen Amelia	United Kingdom	World War I: The cargo ship was sunk torpedoed, shelled, and sunk in the Atlantic Ocean 19 nautical miles (35 km) north north east of Muckle Flugga by SM UB-62 (Imperial German Navy). Her crew survived.
Ronald	United Kingdom	World War I: The fishing smack was scuttled in Irish Sea 25 nautical miles (46 km) south west of the Coningbeg Lightship (United Kingdom) by SM UC-48 (Imperial German Navy). Her crew survived.
SM UC-45	Imperial German Navy	The Type UC II submarine sank in the North Sea (54°09′N 7°35′E) with the loss of all 35 crew. She was later salvaged, repaired and returned to service.

== 18 September ==
List of shipwrecks: 18 September 1917
Ship	State	Description
Arendal	Norway	World War I: The cargo ship was shelled and sunk in the Atlantic Ocean 115 nautical miles (213 km) west of Cape Spartel, Morocco (35°27′N 8°20′W) by SM U-63 (Imperial German Navy). Her crew survived.
Cachalot	Tunisia	World War I: The sailing vessel was shelled and sunk in the Gulf of Gabès off the Kerkennah Islands (35°14′N 11°08′E) by SM UC-52 (Imperial German Navy). Her crew survived.
Car Float No. 15	United States	The car float sank near pier #4 at South Boston, Massachusetts. Later raised.
HMS Contest	Royal Navy	World War I: The Acasta-class destroyer was torpedoed and sunk in the Western Approaches (48°54′N 7°03′W) by SM U-106 (Imperial German Navy) with the loss of 35 of her 75 crew.
Cora M. or Cora M.	Canada	The vessel, described as either a steam cargo ship or a lumber schooner, was wrecked and destroyed off Monomoy Point, Massachusetts.
HMS Glenfoyle	Royal Navy	World War I: The Q-ship was torpedoed and sunk in the Atlantic Ocean south west of Ireland (50°46′N 11°04′W) by SM U-43 (Imperial German Navy) with the loss of eighteen crew.
Joseph Chamberlain	United Kingdom	World War I: The cargo ship was torpedoed and sunk in the Atlantic Ocean 50 nautical miles (93 km) north by west of Muckle Flugga, Shetland Islands by SM UB-62 (Imperial German Navy) with the loss of eighteen of her crew. Two survivors were taken as prisoners of war.
Polar Prince	United Kingdom	World War I: The collier was torpedoed and sunk in the Atlantic Ocean 8 nautical miles (15 km) south west of Cape Spartel, Spanish Morocco (35°30′N 6°45′W) by SM UB-50(Imperial German Navy). Her crew survived, but her captain was taken as a prisoner of war.
Port Kembla	United Kingdom	World War I: The cargo ship struck a mine and sank off Cape Farewell, New Zealand. Her crew were rescued.

== 19 September ==
List of shipwrecks: 19 September 1917
Ship	State	Description
Blanche	France	World War I: The four-masted barque was torpedoed and sunk in the Atlantic Ocean (47°00′N 10°30′W) by SM U-151 (Imperial German Navy) with the loss of eighteen crew.
Etal Manor	United Kingdom	World War I: The collier was torpedoed and sunk in the Atlantic Ocean 7 nautical miles (13 km) south by west of Hook Point, County Waterford by SM UC-48 (Imperial German Navy) with the loss of six of her crew.
Hydra	Denmark	World War I: The three-masted schooner was shelled and sunk in the Atlantic Ocean west of the Orkney Islands, United Kingdom (59°33′N 7°37′W) by SM U-94 (Imperial German Navy) with the loss of all six crew.
Marthe Marguerite	France	World War I: The three-masted barque was shelled and sunk in the Atlantic Ocean north west of Cape Finisterre, Spain (46°18′N 11°25′W) by SM U-54 (Imperial German Navy). Her crew survived.
Montana	Norway	The cargo ship capsized and sank in the Mediterranean Sea off Tunis, Tunisia.
Saint Ronald	United Kingdom	World War I: The cargo ship was torpedoed and sunk in the Atlantic Ocean 95 nautical miles (176 km) north north west of Tory Island, County Donegal (56°22′N 10°17′W) by SM U-82 (Imperial German Navy) with the loss of 24 of her crew.
Teresita	Italy	World War I: The sailing vessel was sunk in the Tyrrhenian Sea by SM UC-53 (Imperial German Navy).

== 20 September ==
List of shipwrecks: 20 September 1917
Ship	State	Description
Fabian	United Kingdom	World War I: The cargo ship was torpedoed and sunk in the Atlantic Ocean 30 nautical miles (56 km) off Cape Spartel, Morocco (35°45′N 6°40′W) by SM UB-50 (Imperial German Navy) with the loss of three of her crew.
Gioffredo Mameli	Italy	World War I: The cargo ship was sunk in the Atlantic Ocean 45 nautical miles (83 km) north west of Cape Spartel (36°05′N 6°15′W) by SM UB-50 (Imperial German Navy).
Kurdistan	United Kingdom	World War I: The collier was torpedoed and sunk in the Mediterranean Sea 27 nautical miles (50 km) east south east of Pantelleria, Italy (36°40′N 12°37′E) by SM U-32 (Imperial German Navy). Her crew survived.

== 21 September ==
List of shipwrecks: 21 September 1917
Ship	State	Description
Aline Montreuil	France	World War I: The cargo ship was torpedoed and sunk in the English Channel 22 nautical miles (41 km) north of Cap Barfleur, Manche (50°02′N 1°18′W) by SM UB-38 (Imperial German Navy). Her crew survived.
Christina	Italy	World War I: The sailing vessel was sunk in the Tyrrhenian Sea by SM UC-53 (Imperial German Navy).
Kouang-si	France	World War I: The passenger ship was torpedoed and damaged in the English Channel 6 nautical miles (11 km) south east of The Lizard, Cornwall, United Kingdom by SM UC-48 (Imperial German Navy). She was beached but was later refloated.
Radaas	Denmark	World War I: The cargo ship was torpedoed and sunk in the English Channel 18 nautical miles (33 km) west of Portland Bill, Dorset, United Kingdom (50°34′N 3°05′W) by SM UB-40 (Imperial German Navy) with the loss of a crew member.
Santo Nicola	Italy	World War I: The sailing vessel was sunk in the Aegean Sea by SM UC-23 (Imperial German Navy).
Spiridon	Greece	World War I: The sailing vessel was sunk in the Aegean Sea by SM UC-23 (Imperial German Navy).

== 22 September ==
List of shipwrecks: 22 September 1917
Ship	State	Description
Alkyon	Greece	World War I: The cargo ship was sunk in the Mediterranean Sea off Oran, Algeria by SM UB-50 (Imperial German Navy). Her crew survived.
Caroline	France	World War I: The schooner was shelled and sunk in the Mediterranean Sea 60 nautical miles (110 km) west of Asinara Island, Italy by SM U-32 (Imperial German Navy). Her crew survived.
Garifaglia	Greece	World War I: The barque was scuttled in the Mediterranean Sea west of Crete (34°57′N 22°14′E) by SM UC-38 (Imperial German Navy).
Greleen	United Kingdom	World War I: The cargo ship was torpedoed and sunk in the English Channel 7 nautical miles (13 km) east by north of Berry Head, Devon (50°28′N 3°14′W) by SM UB-40 (Imperial German Navy) with the loss of nineteen of her crew.
SMS Inn	Austro-Hungarian Navy	World War I: The river monitor struck a Romanian mine laid by Danube ships (Royal Romanian Navy) and sank near Brăila.
Italia	France	World War I: The coaster was sunk in the Atlantic Ocean 11 nautical miles (20 km) north west of Cape Ortegal, A Coruña, Spain by SM UC-63 (Imperial German Navy).
John Knudsen	Norway	World War I: The cargo ship was sunk in the Mediterranean Sea 20 nautical miles (37 km) north of Cape Falcon, Algeria (36°00′N 1°01′W) by SM UB-50 (Imperial German Navy) with the loss of a crew member.
Mascotte	France	World War I: The schooner was sunk in the English Channel 114 nautical miles (211 km) off Ouessant, Finistère by SM U-60 (Imperial German Navy). Her crew survived.
Primo	Italy	World War I: The sailing vessel was sunk in the Tyrrhenian Sea 3 nautical miles (5.6 km) off the Fimara Grande Lightship (Italy) by SM UC-53 (Imperial German Navy).
Trongate	United Kingdom	World War I: The cargo ship was torpedoed and sunk in the North Sea 5 nautical miles (9.3 km) north west of Flamborough Head, Yorkshire by SM UC-71 (Imperial German Navy) with the loss of two of her crew.
Ville de Valenciennes	France	World War I: The cargo ship was sunk in the North Sea 5 nautical miles (9.3 km) south east of Flamborough Head by SM UC-64 (Imperial German Navy). Her crew survived.
William P. Rend	United States	The wooden barge foundered in 17 feet (5.2 m) of water in Lake Huron off Alpena, Michigan, at 45.062367°N 83.392583°W without loss of life.

== 23 September ==
List of shipwrecks: 23 September 1917
Ship	State	Description
Agios Nicolaos	Greece	World War I: The schooner was shelled and sunk in the Mediterranean Sea west of Crete (35°33′N 23°28′E) by SM UC-38 (Imperial German Navy).
Argietta	Italy	World War I: The brigantine was scuttled in the Tyrrhenian Sea by SM UC-53 (Imperial German Navy).
Giuseppina Concertina	Italy	World War I: The sailing vessel was sunk in the Tyrrhenian Sea by SM UC-53 (Imperial German Navy).
Gloire	France	World War I: The fishing vessel was scuttled in the Atlantic Ocean 240 nautical miles (440 km) off Ouessant, Finistère by SM U-60 (Imperial German Navy). Her crew were rescued by the fishing vessel Algesiras (France).
Henry Lippitt	United States	World War I: The sailing vessel was scuttled in the Atlantic Ocean 200 nautical miles (370 km) west of Brest, Finistère (48°17′N 10°05′W) by SM U-60 (Imperial German Navy). Her crew survived.
Hornsund	United Kingdom	World War I: The cargo ship was torpedoed and sunk in the North Sea 2.5 nautical miles (4.6 km) east south east of Scarborough, Yorkshire by SM UC-71 (Imperial German Navy) with the loss of a crew member.
Irthington	United Kingdom	World War I: The cargo ship was torpedoed and sunk in the Gulf of Gioja 3 nautical miles (5.6 km) east north east of Cape Vaticano, Italy (40°35′N 15°01′E) by SM UC-53 (Imperial German Navy). Her crew survived.
Itasca	United States	The freighter sprung a leak in severe weather and foundered in the Atlantic Ocean 250 miles (400 km) off Bermuda. Her captain was killed, two crewmen died later, 24 survivors, including the captain's wife, were rescued by a US steamer nine days later 250 miles off Nantucket.
Jeune Mathilde	France	World War I: The fishing vessel was scuttled in the Atlantic Ocean 240 nautical miles (440 km) west of Ouessant by SM U-60 (Imperial German Navy). Her crew were rescued by Algesiras (France).
Joaquina	Spain	World War I: The sailing vessel was sunk in the Mediterranean Sea 8 nautical miles (15 km) off Cadaqués, Girona, Spain by SM UC-27 (Imperial German Navy).
Medie	France	World War I: The transport ship was sunk in the Mediterranean Sea 120 nautical miles (220 km) north west of Cape Bougaroni, Algeria by SM UC-27 (Imperial German Navy) with the loss of 250 of the 626 people on board.
Nicholaos	Greece	World War I: The sailing vessel was sunk in the Aegean Sea by SM UC-23 (Imperial German Navy).
Perseverance	United Kingdom	World War I: The schooner was shelled and sunk in the English Channel 14 nautical miles (26 km) north west by north of Saint-Valery-en-Caux, Seine-Inférieure, France by SM UC-47 (Imperial German Navy). Her crew survived.
Rosehill	United Kingdom	World War I: The collier was torpedoed and damaged in the English Channel 5 nautical miles (9.3 km) south west by south Fowey, Cornwall by SM UB-40 (Imperial German Navy). She was taken in tow but sank in Whitesand Bay (50°19′40″N 4°18′25″W). Her crew survived.
St. Dunstan	United Kingdom	World War I: The dredger struck a mine and sank in the English Channel 12 nautical miles (22 km) north west by west of Portland Bill, Dorset with the loss of two of her crew.
Western Belle	United States	The schooner barge lost her towline to Warrior (United States) in severe weather and then sprung a leak and foundered in the Atlantic Ocean 22 miles (35 km) east of Fenwick Island. Three crew were killed.

== 24 September ==
List of shipwrecks: 24 September 1917
Ship	State	Description
Europe	France	World War I: The four-masted barque was scuttled in the Atlantic Ocean (46°37′N 11°30′W) by SM UC-63 (Imperial German Navy). Her crew survived.
HMT Hastfen	Royal Navy	World War I: The naval trawler struck a mine and sank in the North Sea with the loss of four of her crew.
Iriston	United Kingdom	World War I: The cargo ship was torpedoed and sunk in the Mediterranean Sea 7 nautical miles (13 km) south by west of Cape Camarat, Var, France (43°17′N 6°49′E) by SM U-32 (Imperial German Navy). Her crew survived.
Leka	Norway	World War I: The cargo ship was sunk in the North Sea 6 to 8 nautical miles (11 to 15 km) east of Flamborough Head, Yorkshire, United Kingdom by SM UC-71 (Imperial German Navy) with the loss of seventeen of her crew.
Louis Bossert	Norway	World War I: The sailing vessel was sunk in the Bay of Biscay (45°11′N 9°35′W) by SM U-54 (Imperial German Navy). Her crew survived.
Mimosa	France	World War I: The three-masted schooner was shelled and damaged in the Atlantic Ocean 25 nautical miles (46 km) north west of the Isles of Scilly, United Kingdom by SM UC-47 (Imperial German Navy) with the loss of a crew member. Survivors abandoned ship and were rescued or reached St. Mary's in their lifeboats. Mimosa was later towed in to St Mary's.
Nuova Francesca	Italy	World War I: The sailing vessel was sunk in the Tyrrhenian Sea by SM UC-53 (Imperial German Navy).
Perseverance	France	World War I: The four-masted barque was scuttled in the Atlantic Ocean by SM UC-63 (Imperial German Navy). Her crew survived.
S. Espedito	Italy	World War I: The sailing vessel was sunk in the Tyrrhenian Sea by SM UC-53 (Imperial German Navy). Her crew survived.

== 25 September ==
List of shipwrecks: 25 September 1917
Ship	State	Description
Boynton	United Kingdom	World War I: The cargo ship was torpedoed and sunk in the Atlantic Ocean 5 nautical miles (9.3 km) west north west of Cape Cornwall (50°05′N 5°55′W) by SM UC-47 (Imperial German Navy) with the loss of 23 of her crew.
City of Swansea	United Kingdom	World War I: The cargo ship was torpedoed and sunk in the English Channel 15 nautical miles (28 km) east north east of Berry Head, Devon by SM UB-40 (Imperial German Navy) with the loss of two of her crew.
Dinorah	France	World War I: The cargo ship was sunk in the Atlantic Ocean (approximately 46°45′N 12°00′W) by SM UC-63 (Imperial German Navy).
Edouard Detaille	France	World War I: The barque was torpedoed and sunk in the Atlantic Ocean (46°00′N 9°30′W) by SM U-60 (Imperial German Navy). Her crew survived.
HMT James Seckar	Royal Navy	World War I: The naval trawler was sunk in the Atlantic Ocean (approximately 46°45′N 12°00′W) by SM UC-63 (Imperial German Navy) with the loss of sixteen of her crew.
Marceau	France	World War I: The schooner was sunk in the Atlantic Ocean (46°15′N 9°42′W) by SM U-54 (Imperial German Navy). Her crew survived.
Paolina	United States	World War I: The barque was shelled and sunk, or captured and scuttled, in the Atlantic Ocean 100 nautical miles (190 km) north west of Ouessant, Finistère, France (48°37′N 8°45′W) by SM UC-65 (Imperial German Navy). Her crew survived.
Unione Republicaine	France	World War I: The fishing vessel was sunk in the Atlantic Ocean 100 nautical miles (190 km) west north west of Penmarc'h, Finistère (48°05′N 7°14′W) by SM U-90 (Imperial German Navy).

== 26 September ==
List of shipwrecks: 26 September 1917
Ship	State	Description
Acorn	United Kingdom	World War I: The schooner was shelled and sunk in the English Channel 20 nautical miles (37 km) south by east of Start Point, Devon by SM UC-69 (Imperial German Navy). Her crew survived.
Ciro	Italy	World War I: The sailing vessel was scuttled in the Mediterranean Sea south of Sardinia by SM UB-50 (Imperial German Navy).
Heraklios	Greece	World War I: The cargo ship was sunk in the Mediterranean Sea off Cape Cherchell, Algeria (36°38′N 1°50′E) by SM U-63 (Imperial German Navy). Her crew survived.
Jacqueline	France	World War I: The barque was torpedoed and sunk in the Atlantic Ocean 250 nautical miles (460 km) south west of Ouessant, Finistère (46°21′N 9°44′W) by SM U-101 (Imperial German Navy) with the loss of all 35 crew.
HMT Ocean Star	Royal Navy	World War I: The naval trawler struck a mine and sank in the English Channel off the Nab Lightship (United Kingdom) with the loss of ten of her crew.
Okhotnik	Imperial Russian Navy	World War I: The Okhotnik-class destroyer struck an Imperial German Navy mine and sank in the Irben Strait.
S.N.A. 3	France	World War I: The cargo ship was torpedoed and sunk in the North Sea 17 nautical miles (31 km) off Flamborough Head, Yorkshire, United Kingdom (53°54′N 0°07′E) by SM UB-30 (Imperial German Navy). Her crew survived; they were rescued by Portaferry (United Kingdom).
SM UC-33	Imperial German Navy	World War I: The Type UC II submarine was shelled, rammed and sunk in St. George's Channel (51°55′N 6°14′W) by the patrol boat PC-61 (Royal Navy) with the loss of 27 of her 28 crew.

== 27 September ==
List of shipwrecks: 27 September 1917
Ship	State	Description
HM CMB-8	Royal Navy	The Coastal Motor Boat was lost on this date.
Cydonia	United Kingdom	The collier was lost on this date.
Deux Jeannes	France	World War I: The fishing vessel was sunk in the Atlantic Ocean 30 nautical miles (56 km) south west of Ouessant, Finistère (48°06′N 5°40′W) by SM U-90 (Imperial German Navy).
Greltoria	United Kingdom	World War I: The cargo ship was torpedoed and sunk in the North Sea 3 nautical miles (5.6 km) north west by north of Flamborough Head, Yorkshire by SM UB-34 (Imperial German Navy). Her crew survived.
Liberté	France	World War I: The fishing vessel was sunk in the Atlantic Ocean 30 nautical miles (56 km) south west of Ouessant (48°06′N 5°40′W) by SM U-90 (Imperial German Navy).
Peuples Frères	France	World War I: The fishing vessel was sunk in the Atlantic Ocean 30 nautical miles (56 km) south west Ouessant (48°06′N 5°40′W) by SM U-90 (Imperial German Navy).
SM UC-6	Imperial German Navy	World War I: The Type UC I submarine struck a mine and sank in the North Sea off North Foreland, Kent, United Kingdom (51°30′N 1°34′E) with the loss of all sixteen crew.

== 29 September ==
List of shipwrecks: 29 September 1917
Ship	State	Description
Bon Premier	France	World War I: The barque was shelled and sunk in the Atlantic Ocean 200 nautical miles (370 km) south west of Ouessant, Finistère (46°06′N 11°25′W) by SM U-60 (Imperial German Navy). Her crew survived.
Elmsgarth	United Kingdom	World War I: The cargo ship was torpedoed and sunk in the Atlantic Ocean 50 nautical miles (93 km) north west of Tory Island, County Donegal by SM U-61 (Imperial German Navy). Her crew survived.
Eugenie Fautrel	France	World War I: The barque was shelled and sunk in the Atlantic Ocean 200 nautical miles (370 km) south west of Ouessant (46°30′N 9°59′W) by SM U-60 (Imperial German Navy). Her crew were rescued by the fishing vessel Cygne (France).
Kildonan	United Kingdom	World War I: The cargo ship was torpedoed and sunk in the Irish Sea 2 nautical miles (3.7 km) north north west of the Pendeen Lighthouse, Cornwall (50°11′N 5°42′W) by SM UB-35 (Imperial German Navy) with the loss of fourteen of her crew.
Percy B.	United Kingdom	World War I: The schooner was shelled and sunk in the Atlantic Ocean 180 nautical miles (330 km) north by west of Cape Villano, Spain by SM U-60 (Imperial German Navy). Her crew survived.
R 235	France	World War I: The fishing schooner was sunk in the Mediterranean Sea (34°38′N 34°43′E) by SM U-73 (Imperial German Navy). Her crew survived.
Sanwen	United Kingdom	World War I: The cargo ship was torpedoed and sunk in the Mediterranean Sea off Cape Béar, Spain (42°52′N 4°15′E) by SM U-32 (Imperial German Navy) with the loss of two crew.
Swan River	United Kingdom	World War I: The cargo ship was torpedoed and sunk in the Mediterranean Sea 27 nautical miles (50 km) west of Oran, Algeria (36°07′N 0°54′W) by SM U-39 (Imperial German Navy). Her crew survived.
SM UC-55	Imperial German Navy	World War I: The Type UC II submarine was shelled, depth charged and sunk off the Shetland Islands, United Kingdom (60°02′N 1°02′W) by HMS Sylvia and HMS Tirade (both Royal Navy) with the loss of ten of her 27 crew.

== 30 September ==
List of shipwrecks: 30 September 1917
Ship	State	Description
Amiral Troude	France	World War I: The barque was torpedoed and sunk in the Atlantic Ocean 400 nautical miles (740 km) off Penmarc'h, Finistère (46°40′N 15°30′W) by SM UB-51 (Imperial German Navy). Her crew survived.
HMT Charlsin	Royal Navy	World War I: The naval trawler was scuttled in the Mediterranean Sea 8 nautical miles (15 km) north of Mersa Matruh, Egypt by SM UC-74 (Imperial German Navy). Her crew survived.
Drake	United Kingdom	World War I: The cargo ship was shelled and sunk in the Atlantic Ocean 340 nautical miles (630 km) west of Ouessant, Finistère (46°43′N 13°01′W) by SM U-90 (Imperial German Navy). Her crew survived, but her captain was taken as a prisoner of war.
Heron	United Kingdom	World War I: The coaster was torpedoed and sunk in the Atlantic Ocean 300 nautical miles (560 km) south west of Ouessant (46°27′N 11°14′W) by SM U-90 (Imperial German Navy) with the loss of 22 crew.
Midlothian	United Kingdom	World War I: The cargo ship was shelled and sunk in the Mediterranean Sea 80 nautical miles (150 km) south of Cape Greco, Cyprus by SM U-73 (Imperial German Navy). Her crew survived, but three of them were taken as prisoners of war.
Nicolosa	Greece	World War I: The sailing vessel was sunk in the Mediterranean Sea off Cyprus by SM U-73 (Imperial German Navy).

== Unknown date ==
List of shipwrecks: Unknown date 1917
Ship	State	Description
HMS Poleaxe	Royal Navy	The T-13-class minesweeper was wrecked off the coast of Scotland.
SM U-66	Imperial German Navy	World War I: The Type U 66 submarine is believed to have struck a mine and sank in the North Sea off the Dogger Bank on or after 3 September with the loss of all 40 crew.
SM UB-32	Imperial German Navy	World War I: The Type UB II submarine was lost after 17 September. She may have been bombed and sunk on 22 September by Royal Naval Air Service aircraft.
