= SM UC-71 =

German Type UC II minelaying submarine

Coordinates: 54°10′N 7°54′E

History

German Empire
- Name: UC-71
- Ordered: 12 January 1916
- Builder: Blohm & Voss, Hamburg
- Yard number: 287
- Launched: 12 August 1916
- Commissioned: 28 November 1916
- Fate: Sunk on way to surrender, 20 February 1919

General characteristics
- Class & type: Type UC II submarine
- Displacement: 427 t (420 long tons), surfaced; 508 t (500 long tons), submerged
- Length: 50.35 m (165 ft 2 in) o/a; 40.30 m (132 ft 3 in) pressure hull
- Beam: 5.22 m (17 ft 2 in) o/a; 3.65 m (12 ft) pressure hull
- Draught: 3.64 m (11 ft 11 in)
- Propulsion: 2 × propeller shafts; 2 × 6-cylinder, 4-stroke diesel engines, 600 PS (440 kW; 590 shp); 2 × electric motors, 620 PS (460 kW; 610 shp)
- Speed: 12.0 knots (22.2 km/h; 13.8 mph), surfaced; 7.4 knots (13.7 km/h; 8.5 mph), submerged
- Range: 10,420 nmi (19,300 km; 11,990 mi) at 7 knots (13 km/h; 8.1 mph) surfaced; 52 nmi (96 km; 60 mi) at 4 knots (7.4 km/h; 4.6 mph) submerged
- Test depth: 50 m (160 ft)
- Complement: 26
- Armament: 6 × 100 cm (39.4 in) mine tubes; 18 × UC 200 mines; 3 × 50 cm (19.7 in) torpedo tubes (2 bow/external; one stern); 7 × torpedoes; 1 × 8.8 cm (3.5 in) Uk L/30 deck gun
- Notes: 35-second diving time

Service record
- Part of: Flandern / Flandern II Flotilla; 3 March 1917 – 13 October 1918; I Flotilla; 13 October – 11 November 1918
- Commanders: Oblt.z.S. Hans Valentiner; 28 November 1916 – 25 April 1917; Oblt.z.S. Hugo Thielmann; 26 April – 9 June 1917; Oblt.z.S. Reinhold Saltzwedel; 10 June – 13 September 1917; Oblt.z.S. Ernst Steindorff; 14 September 1917 – 28 January 1918; Oblt.z.S. Walter Warzecha; 29 January – 13 August 1918; Oblt.z.S. Eberhard Schmidt; 14 August – 11 November 1918
- Operations: 19 patrols
- Victories: 53 merchant ships sunk (105,217 GRT); 10 auxiliary warships sunk (5,533 GRT); 16 merchant ships damaged (73,546 GRT); 1 warship damaged (1,250 tons); 1 auxiliary warship damaged (543 GRT)

SM UC-71 was a German Type UC II minelaying submarine or U-boat in the German Imperial Navy (German: Kaiserliche Marine) during World War I. The U-boat was ordered on 12 January 1916 and was launched on 12 August 1916. She was commissioned into the German Imperial Navy on 28 November 1916 as SM UC-71. (Note: "SM" stands for "Seiner Majestät" (English: His Majesty's) and combined with the U for Unterseeboot would be translated as His Majesty's Submarine.) In 19 patrols UC-71 was credited with sinking 63 ships, either by torpedo or by mines laid. UC-71 sank on 20 February 1919 in the North Sea while on her way to be surrendered. Discovery a century later of her wreck with all hatches open suggested she had been deliberately scuttled by her own crew (all of whom survived).

== Design ==
A Type UC II submarine, UC-71 had a displacement of 427 tonnes (420 long tons) when at the surface and 508 tonnes (500 long tons) while submerged. She had a length overall of 50.35 m (165 ft 2 in), a beam of 5.22 m (17 ft 2 in), and a draught of 3.64 m (11 ft 11 in). The submarine was powered by two six-cylinder four-stroke diesel engines each producing 300 metric horsepower (220 kW; 300 shp) (a total of 600 metric horsepower (440 kW; 590 shp)), two electric motors producing 620 metric horsepower (460 kW; 610 shp), and two propeller shafts. She had a dive time of 48 seconds and was capable of operating at a depth of 50 metres (160 ft).

The submarine had a maximum surface speed of 12 knots (22 km/h; 14 mph) and a submerged speed of 7.4 knots (13.7 km/h; 8.5 mph). When submerged, she could operate for 52 nautical miles (96 km; 60 mi) at 4 knots (7.4 km/h; 4.6 mph); when surfaced, she could travel 10,420 nautical miles (19,300 km; 11,990 mi) at 7 knots (13 km/h; 8.1 mph). UC-71 was fitted with six 100 centimetres (39 in) mine tubes, eighteen UC 200 mines, three 50 centimetres (20 in) torpedo tubes (one on the stern and two on the bow), seven torpedoes, and one 8.8 cm (3.5 in) Uk L/30 deck gun. Her complement was twenty-six crew members.

== Summary of raiding history ==
Date	Name	Nationality	Tonnage (Note: Merchant ship tonnages are in gross register tons. Military vessels are listed by tons displacement.)	Fate
30 March 1917	Edernian	United Kingdom	3,588	Damaged
30 March 1917	Saint Louis III	French Navy	97	Sunk
30 March 1917	Sarcelle	France	49	Sunk
31 March 1917	Primrose	United Kingdom	113	Sunk
3 April 1917	Ellen James	United Kingdom	165	Sunk
4 April 1917	Pensiero	Kingdom of Italy	2,632	Sunk
5 April 1917	Gower Coast	United Kingdom	804	Sunk
5 April 1917	San Fulgencio	Spain	1,558	Sunk
7 April 1917	Caminha	Portugal	2,763	Sunk
9 April 1917	Themistoclis	Greece	1,895	Sunk
9 April 1917	Valhall	Norway	750	Sunk
10 April 1917	Ranvik	Norway	5,848	Sunk
12 April 1917	Edelweiss	France	192	Sunk
18 April 1917	Heim	Norway	1,669	Sunk
23 April 1917	Cenobic	Belgium	16	Sunk
2 May 1917	Westland	Netherlands	108	Sunk
5 May 1917	Simon	Netherlands	150	Sunk
15 May 1917	Boreas	Netherlands	192	Sunk
16 May 1917	Hendrika Johana	Netherlands	134	Sunk
17 May 1917	Jakoba	Netherlands	107	Sunk
17 May 1917	Mercurius	Netherlands	80	Sunk
18 May 1917	Annetta	Netherlands	177	Sunk
14 June 1917	Wega	United Kingdom	839	Sunk
15 June 1917	Wapello	United Kingdom	5,576	Sunk
26 June 1917	Normandy	French Navy	543	Damaged
28 June 1917	Marne	France	4,019	Sunk
29 June 1917	Driskos	Greece	2,833	Sunk
3 July 1917	Orleans	United States	2,853	Sunk
4 July 1917	Snetoppen	Norway	2,349	Sunk
6 July 1917	Løvstakken	Norway	3,105	Sunk
6 July 1917	Victoria 2	Norway	2,798	Sunk
8 July 1917	Vendee	United Kingdom	1,295	Sunk
3 August 1917	Aube	United Kingdom	1,837	Sunk
4 August 1917	Afrique	France	2,457	Damaged
4 August 1917	Cairnstrath	United Kingdom	2,128	Sunk
7 August 1917	Port Curtis	United Kingdom	4,710	Sunk
8 August 1917	HMS Dunraven	Royal Navy	3,117	Sunk
6 September 1917	Elisabethville	Belgium	7,017	Sunk
7 September 1917	Mont de Piete	France	38	Sunk
7 September 1917	Kleber	France	277	Damaged
8 September 1917	Setubal	Norway	1,201	Sunk
9 September 1917	HMS Myosotis	Royal Navy	1,250	Damaged
10 September 1917	Vikholmen	Norway	494	Sunk
22 September 1917	Matti	Norway	2,139	Damaged
22 September 1917	Trongate	United Kingdom	2,553	Sunk
23 September 1917	Hornsund	United Kingdom	3,646	Sunk
24 September 1917	Leka	Norway	1,845	Sunk
31 October 1917	Estrellano	United Kingdom	1,161	Sunk
5 November 1917	USS Alcedo	United States Navy	983	Sunk
16 November 1917	Naalso	French Navy	135	Sunk
6 December 1917	HMT Apley	Royal Navy	222	Sunk
6 December 1917	Wyndhurst	United Kingdom	570	Sunk
6 December 1917	Braeside	United Kingdom	569	Sunk
24 December 1917	Luciston	United Kingdom	2,877	Sunk
25 December 1917	Espagne	Belgium	1,463	Sunk
25 December 1917	Hyacinthus	United Kingdom	5,756	Damaged
27 December 1917	P. L. M. 4	France	2,640	Sunk
28 December 1917	Fallodon	United Kingdom	3,012	Sunk
28 December 1917	HMD Piscatorial II	Royal Navy	93	Sunk
29 December 1917	HMT Sapper	Royal Navy	276	Sunk
18 January 1918	HMT Gambri	Royal Navy	274	Sunk
20 January 1918	Harmonides	United Kingdom	3,521	Damaged
23 January 1918	Aalesund	Norway	414	Sunk
14 February 1918	Atlas	United Kingdom	3,090	Sunk
19 February 1918	Athenic	United Kingdom	4,078	Damaged
19 February 1918	Commonwealth	United Kingdom	3,353	Sunk
8 March 1918	Saba	United Kingdom	4,257	Damaged
12 March 1918	Clarissa Radcliffe	United Kingdom	5,754	Damaged
12 March 1918	Savan	United Kingdom	4,264	Damaged
13 March 1918	Londonier	Belgium	1,870	Sunk
14 March 1918	HMT Agate	Royal Navy	248	Sunk
14 March 1918	Comrie Castle	United Kingdom	5,173	Damaged
7 April 1918	Highland Brigade	United Kingdom	5,669	Sunk
12 April 1918	Luis	United Kingdom	4,284	Sunk
10 May 1918	Amplegarth	United Kingdom	3,707	Sunk
15 May 1918	Pennyworth	United Kingdom	5,388	Damaged
20 May 1918	Manchester Importer	United Kingdom	4,028	Damaged
26 June 1918	Raranga	United Kingdom	10,040	Damaged
31 July 1918	HMD City of Liverpool	Royal Navy	88	Sunk
4 August 1918	Waipara	United Kingdom	6,994	Damaged
5 August 1918	Polescar	United Kingdom	5,832	Damaged
