= SM U-60 =

History

German Empire
- Name: U-60
- Ordered: 6 October 1914
- Builder: AG Weser, Bremen
- Yard number: 215
- Laid down: 22 June 1915
- Launched: 5 July 1916
- Commissioned: 1 November 1916
- Fate: 21 November 1918 - Surrendered. Foundered in tow to breakers 1919.

General characteristics
- Class & type: Type U 57 submarine
- Displacement: 768 t (756 long tons) surfaced; 956 t (941 long tons) submerged
- Length: 67.00 m (219 ft 10 in) (o/a); 54.02 m (177 ft 3 in) (pressure hull)
- Beam: 6.32 m (20 ft 9 in) (oa); 4.05 m (13 ft 3 in) (pressure hull)
- Height: 8.05 m (26 ft 5 in)
- Draught: 3.79 m (12 ft 5 in)
- Installed power: 2 × 2,400 PS (1,765 kW; 2,367 shp) surfaced; 2 × 1,200 PS (883 kW; 1,184 shp) submerged
- Propulsion: 2 shafts
- Speed: 16.5 knots (30.6 km/h; 19.0 mph) surfaced; 8.4 knots (15.6 km/h; 9.7 mph) submerged
- Range: 11,400 nmi (21,100 km; 13,100 mi) at 8 knots (15 km/h; 9.2 mph) surfaced; 49 nmi (91 km; 56 mi) at 5 knots (9.3 km/h; 5.8 mph) submerged
- Test depth: 50 m (164 ft 1 in)
- Complement: 36
- Armament: 4 × 50 cm (19.7 in) torpedo tubes (two bow, two stern); 7 torpedoes; 1 × 10.5 cm (4.1 in) SK L/45 deck gun; 1 × 8.8 cm (3.5 in) SK L/30 deck gun

Service record
- Part of: II Flotilla; 13 January 1917 – 11 November 1918
- Commanders: Kptlt. Karlgeorg Schuster; 1 November 1916 – 31 October 1917; Kptlt. Karl (i.V.) Jasper; 1–20 November 1917; Kptlt. Franz Grünert; 21 November 1917 – 11 November 1918
- Operations: 10 patrols
- Victories: 52 merchant ships sunk (107,940 GRT); 3 merchant ships damaged (7,447 GRT)

SM U-60 (Note: "SM" stands for "Seiner Majestät" (English: His Majesty's) and combined with the U for Unterseeboot would be translated as His Majesty's Submarine.) was a German Type UB III submarine of the Imperial German Navy in the First World War. She took part in the First Battle of the Atlantic.

U-60 was surrendered to the Allies at Harwich on 21 November 1918 in accordance with the requirements of the Armistice with Germany. She was sold by the British Admiralty to George Cohen on 3 March 1919 for £2,410, but sank in tow for Swansea after 12 June 1919.

== Summary of raiding history ==
| Date | Name | Nationality | Tonnage (Note: Tonnages are in gross register tons) | Fate |
|---|---|---|---|---|
| 4 February 1917 | Ghazee | United Kingdom | 5,084 | Sunk |
| 5 February 1917 | Lux | United Kingdom | 2,621 | Sunk |
| 5 February 1917 | Warley Pickering | United Kingdom | 4,196 | Sunk |
| 7 February 1917 | Storskog | Norway | 2,191 | Sunk |
| 14 February 1917 | Hopemoor | United Kingdom | 3,740 | Sunk |
| 17 February 1917 | Dalbeattie | Norway | 1,327 | Sunk |
| 17 February 1917 | Iolo | United Kingdom | 3,840 | Sunk |
| 21 February 1917 | Tecwyn | United Kingdom | 132 | Sunk |
| 29 March 1917 | Os | Norway | 637 | Sunk |
| 4 April 1917 | Domingo | Italy | 2,131 | Sunk |
| 6 April 1917 | Marion | Norway | 1,587 | Sunk |
| 7 April 1917 | Salmo | United Kingdom | 1,721 | Sunk |
| 16 April 1917 | Queen Mary | United Kingdom | 5,658 | Sunk |
| 19 April 1917 | Howth Head | United Kingdom | 4,440 | Sunk |
| 20 April 1917 | Torr Head | United Kingdom | 5,911 | Sunk |
| 23 April 1917 | Svanen | Denmark | 1,807 | Sunk |
| 10 June 1917 | Clan Alpine | United Kingdom | 3,587 | Sunk |
| 17 June 1917 | Nostra Madre | Italy | 649 | Sunk |
| 19 June 1917 | Brookby | United Kingdom | 3,679 | Sunk |
| 27 June 1917 | Armadale | United Kingdom | 6,153 | Sunk |
| 29 July 1917 | Cesarevitch Alexei | Russia | 2,387 | Sunk |
| 30 July 1917 | Canis | Norway | 526 | Sunk |
| 9 August 1917 | Agne | Sweden | 1,010 | Sunk |
| 9 August 1917 | Export | Russia | 2,712 | Sunk |
| 22 September 1917 | Mascotte | France | 199 | Sunk |
| 23 September 1917 | Gloire | France | 51 | Sunk |
| 23 September 1917 | Henry Lippitt | United States | 895 | Sunk |
| 23 September 1917 | Jeune Mathilde | France | 58 | Sunk |
| 25 September 1917 | Edouard Detaille | France | 2,185 | Sunk |
| 29 September 1917 | Bon Premier | France | 1,352 | Sunk |
| 29 September 1917 | Eugenie Fautrel | France | 2,212 | Sunk |
| 29 September 1917 | Percy B. | Canada | 330 | Sunk |
| 1 October 1917 | Saint Pierre | France | 277 | Sunk |
| 2 October 1917 | Eugene Louise | France | 283 | Damaged |
| 3 October 1917 | Saint Antoine | France | 217 | Sunk |
| 3 October 1917 | Stella | France | 219 | Sunk |
| 11 December 1917 | Bard | Norway | 709 | Sunk |
| 12 December 1917 | St. Croix | Norway | 2,530 | Sunk |
| 19 December 1917 | Ingrid II | Norway | 1,145 | Sunk |
| 22 December 1917 | Hunsbrook | United Kingdom | 4,463 | Damaged |
| 21 February 1918 | Hugin | Sweden | 1,667 | Sunk |
| 25 February 1918 | Apollo | Denmark | 242 | Sunk |
| 3 March 1918 | Northfield | United Kingdom | 2,099 | Sunk |
| 4 March 1918 | Quarnero | Italy | 3,237 | Sunk |
| 28 April 1918 | Poitiers | France | 2,045 | Sunk |
| 28 April 1918 | Rimfakse | Norway | 1,119 | Sunk |
| 29 April 1918 | Saint Chamond | France | 2,866 | Sunk |
| 2 May 1918 | Girdleness | United Kingdom | 3,018 | Sunk |
| 4 May 1918 | Polbrae | United Kingdom | 1,087 | Sunk |
| 5 July 1918 | Vera Elizabeth | United Kingdom | 180 | Sunk |
| 13 July 1918 | Plawsworth | United Kingdom | 4,724 | Sunk |
| 17 July 1918 | Harlseywood | United Kingdom | 2,701 | Damaged |
| 17 July 1918 | Saint Georges | France | 633 | Sunk |
| 20 July 1918 | Gemini | United Kingdom | 2,128 | Sunk |
| 20 July 1918 | Orfordness | United Kingdom | 2,790 | Sunk |

== Bibliography ==
- Gröner, Erich; Jung, Dieter; Maass, Martin (1991). "U-boats and Mine Warfare Vessels". German Warships 1815–1945. Vol. 2. Translated by Thomas, Keith; Magowan, Rachel. London: Conway Maritime Press. ISBN 0-85177-593-4.
