= SM UB-50 =

German Type UB III submarine

- UB-148 at sea, a U-boat similar to UB-50.

History

German Empire
- Name: UB-50
- Ordered: 20 May 1916
- Builder: Blohm & Voss, Hamburg
- Cost: 3,276,000 German Papiermark
- Yard number: 295
- Launched: 6 January 1917
- Commissioned: 12 July 1917
- Fate: Surrendered 16 January 1919; broken up at Swansea

General characteristics
- Class & type: Type UB III submarine
- Displacement: 516 t (508 long tons) surfaced; 651 t (641 long tons) submerged
- Length: 55.30 m (181 ft 5 in) (o/a)
- Beam: 5.80 m (19 ft)
- Draught: 3.68 m (12 ft 1 in)
- Propulsion: 2 × propeller shaft; 2 × MAN four-stroke 6-cylinder diesel engine, 1,050 bhp (780 kW); 2 × Siemens-Schuckert electric motor, 780 shp (580 kW)
- Speed: 13.6 knots (25.2 km/h; 15.7 mph) surfaced; 8 knots (15 km/h; 9.2 mph) submerged
- Range: 9,040 nmi (16,740 km; 10,400 mi) at 5 knots (9.3 km/h; 5.8 mph) surfaced; 55 nmi (102 km; 63 mi) at 4 knots (7.4 km/h; 4.6 mph) submerged
- Test depth: 50 m (160 ft)
- Complement: 3 officers, 31 men
- Armament: 5 × 50 cm (19.7 in) torpedo tubes (4 bow, 1 stern); 10 torpedoes; 1 × 8.8 cm (3.46 in) deck gun

Service record
- Part of: Mittelmeer / Mittelmeer II Flotilla; 30 September 1917 – 11 November 1918
- Commanders: Kptlt. Franz Becker; 12 July 1917 – 30 June 1918; Oblt.z.S. Heinrich Kukat; 1 July – 29 November 1918
- Operations: 7 patrols
- Victories: 38 merchant ships sunk (97,922 GRT); 2 warships sunk (16,499 tons); 7 merchant ships damaged (25,172 GRT)

SM UB-50 was a German Type UB III submarine or U-boat in the German Imperial Navy (German: Kaiserliche Marine) during World War I. The U-boat was ordered on 20 May 1916. She was commissioned into the Pola Flotilla of the German Imperial Navy on 12 July 1917 as SM UB-50. (Note: "SM" stands for "Seiner Majestät" (English: His Majesty's) and combined with the U for Unterseeboot would be translated as His Majesty's Submarine.)

The submarine conducted seven patrols and sank 40 ships during the war for a total loss of 97,922 gross register tons (GRT) and 16,499 tons. She operated as part of the Pola Flotilla based in Cattaro. UB-50 surrendered on 16 January 1919 with the remainder of the Pola Flotilla following an order by Admiral Reinhard Scheer to return to port. During her passage through the Straits of Gibraltar, she managed to sink the battleship HMS Britannia. UB-50 was later broken up at Swansea.

== Construction ==
UB-50 was ordered by the German Imperial Navy on 20 May 1916. She was built by Blohm & Voss, Hamburg and following just under a year of construction, launched at Hamburg on 6 January 1917. UB-50 was commissioned later that same year under the command of Kapitänleutnant (Kptlt.) Franz Becker. Like all Type UB III submarines, UB-50 carried 10 torpedoes and was armed with an 8.8 cm (3.5 in) SK L/30 deck gun. UB-50 could carry a crew of up to 34 men and had a cruising range of 9,040 nautical miles (16,740 km; 10,400 mi). UB-50 had a displacement of 516 t (508 long tons) while surfaced and 651 t (641 long tons) when submerged. Her engines enabled her to travel at 13.6 knots (25.2 km/h; 15.7 mph) when surfaced and 8 knots (15 km/h; 9.2 mph) when submerged.

== Service history ==
=== First patrol ===
Soon after she left Pola, UB-50 encountered the William H. Crawford, a 1,593 GRT American sailing ship. It sank after an attack from the U-boat stopped her. Four days later, UB-50 sighted the 800 GRT British barge R.B.40. UB 50 launched a torpedo which instead hit the British tug towing the ship, the 121 GRT H.s.3. The tug sank, but the barge was not sunk. The following day, UB-50 found two Portuguese sailboats Correiro De Sines and Comizianes Da Graca at 32 GRT and 32 GRT respectively. They were sunk 6 nautical miles (11 km; 6.9 mi) north of Cape Sines. A day later, she found the Portuguese 196 GRT ship Sado, which she sank about 16 nautical miles (30 km; 18 mi) south of her prey the day before. Four days later, UB-50 finally encountered and sank a merchant, this being the 3,611 GRT British Polar Prince, carrying coal for Malta. Two days later, she sank the Fabian, a 2,246 GRT British steamer going to Liverpool, killing three. Later that day, she sank the Gioffredo Mameli, a 4,124 GRT ton Italian steamer carrying ore. The 2,464 GRT coal carrying Greek steamer Alkyon was attacked two days later by UB-50, sinking close off Oran. The UB 50 followed up with the sinking of the 1,670 GRT Norwegian steamer John Knudsen, killing one. Four days later, the 296 GRT Italian sailboat Ciro was scuttled after being hit by UB-50, the last ship she would sink before returning to base.

=== Second patrol ===
SM UB-50 began her second patrol with the sinking of the Marc Fraissinet, a 3,060 GRT French steamer carrying wood, munitions, and hay to Bizerte. It sank 15 nautical miles (28 km; 17 mi) north of Tabarca after being torpedoed by UB-50. Later that day UB 50 encountered the Senegal, an 845 GRT Italian steamer, sinking her off the coast of Algeria with no casualties. Three days after that, the Margram Abbey, a 4,367 GRT British steamer carrying coal, was found and torpedoed by UB-50. It was beached off the coast of Algeria, but the torpedo damage, which killed two, had wrecked the ship. UB 50 attacked the Antaeus, a 3,061 GRT British steamer, three days later off Cape Bon. There were no casualties, but the captain was taken prisoner. On the following day, UB 50 torpedoed the Amberton, a 4,556 GRT British steamer, but she was only damaged. Four days later, the submarine found her last target of her second patrol, the 2,774 GRT American steamer Rizal, which sank 9 nautical miles (17 km; 10 mi) from Cape Cavallo.

=== Third patrol ===
UB-50 started out her third patrol by finding and sinking the 96 GRT Italian sailboat S. Giuseppe B. off the coast of Africa. She sank the 8,293 GRT British steamer City of Lucknow two days later 50 nautical miles (93 km; 58 mi) northeast of the Cani Rocks. On Christmas Day, 1917, UB-50 sank the Sant’ Antonio, an 843 GRT Italian sailing vessel, by gunfire near Bizerte. On New Year's Day, 1918, the Egyptian Transport, a 4,648 GRT British steamer, was damaged during an attack by UB-50, which killed five men. It was later beached but refloated. Two days later, the Allanton, a 4,253 GRT British steamer carrying coal, was sunk by UB-50, which also sunk the Steelville, a 3,649 GRT British steamer also carrying coal later that day. Four days later, UB-50 torpedoed the Arab, a 4,191 GRT British steamer coal off the coast of Cape Serrat, killing 21.

=== Fourth patrol ===
UB-50's fourth patrol was very successful. In less than a month, she sank six vessels. The first victim was the 2,457 GRT French steamer Saint Jean Ii, which went down 22 March 1918 off Cap Bon. That same day, UB-50 managed to damage the British steamer Shadwell off Bizerta. Four days later UB-50 sank the 11,495 GRT Italian steamer Volturno off Bone (Annaba), Algeria. On 6 April, UB-50 sank the French vessel Madeleine Iii and on 11 April, she sank the Italian sailing ship Carmela G and the British vessel Highland Prince.

=== Fifth patrol ===
UB-50 began her fifth war patrol by damaging the 3,926 GRT British steamer Elswick Grange carrying coal off the coast of Oran, killing one. Two days later, she ran across the 3,152 GRT British steamer Mavisbrook carrying coal. She was torpedoed south east of Cabo de Gata, killing 18. On that same day, she came upon the 168 GRT Danish three-masted iron-hulled schooner Kirstine Jesen, sinking after being fired upon from UB-50's deck gun with no deaths. Two days later, the New Sweden, a 5,319 GRT Swedish steamer, was hit by UB-50 and sank. Two days later, UB-50 found the 180 GRT Spanish steamer Maria Pia, which sank with no casualties. Three days after that, the 117 GRT French sailboat Animal Lafont and 257 GRT Italian sailboat Santa Teresa were torpedoed by the U-boat with no casualties.

=== Sixth patrol ===
Shortly before her sixth patrol, Oberleutnant zur See Heinrich Kukat took over command from Kptlt. Becker. On her sixth patrol, UB-50 encountered the Imber, a 2,514 GRT British steamer and torpedoed her south of Cape St. Maria di Leuca, though she survived. Three days later, UB-50 sank the War Swallow, a 5,216 GRT British merchant ship carrying coal from the River Tyne to Port Said. Another three days passed before UB-50 found her next target, the Italian steamer Adria 1, a ship carrying cotton from Palermo to Tunis. It sank, but there were no deaths. Two days later, the 5,257 GRT British steamer Upada was torpedoed by UB-50 killing three, but was only damaged. UB-50 sank the Messidor, a 3,883 GRT British coal steamer two days later, sinking the ship and killing one. The following day, she torpedoed the Rutherglen, a 4,214 GRT British steam merchant carrying coal. That was followed by an attack on the Magellan, a 3,642 GRT British steamer on the following day. She sank with one man. The last ship sunk on the patrol was the Antonio S., a 175 GRT Italian sailboat sunk off the coast of Tunisia.

=== Seventh patrol ===
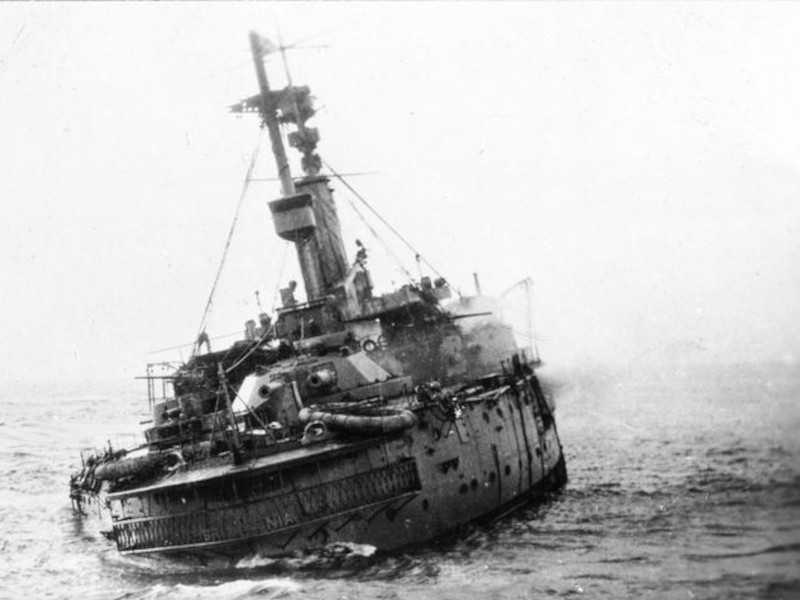
Britannia sinking in the Atlantic off Cape Trafalgar on 9 November 1918.

On 9 November 1918, two days before the Armistice with Germany, UB-50 sank the British battleship HMS Britannia. The Britannia was on a voyage to Gibraltar when she was torpedoed off Cape Trafalgar. After the initial explosion, the ship began listing ten degrees to port. A few minutes later, another explosion started a fire in a 9.2 in (230 mm) magazine, which resulted in a cordite explosion in the magazine. The Britannia stayed at 10-degrees for 2½ hours before sinking. Its 16,350-tons made it the largest ship the U-boat ever sank, and the only one UB-50 would sink during her last patrol.

== Summary of raiding history ==
Date	Name	Nationality	Tonnage (Note: Merchant ship tonnages are in gross register tons. Military vessels are listed by tons displacement.)	Fate
8 September 1917	William H. Clifford	United States	1,593	Sunk
12 September 1917	HS 3	United Kingdom	121	Sunk
12 September 1917	RB 10	United Kingdom	800	Sunk
13 September 1917	Gomizianes Da Graça Odemira	Portugal	32	Sunk
13 September 1917	Correiro De Sines	Portugal	32	Sunk
14 September 1917	Sado	Portugal	196	Sunk
18 September 1917	Polar Prince	United Kingdom	3,611	Sunk
20 September 1917	Fabian	United Kingdom	2,246	Sunk
20 September 1917	Gioffredo Mameli	Kingdom of Italy	4,124	Sunk
22 September 1917	Alkyon	Greece	2,464	Sunk
22 September 1917	John Knudsen	Norway	1,670	Sunk
26 September 1917	Ciro	Kingdom of Italy	296	Sunk
28 October 1917	Marc Fraissinet	France	3,060	Sunk
28 October 1917	Senegal	Kingdom of Italy	845	Sunk
1 November 1917	Margam Abbey	United Kingdom	4,367	Sunk
4 November 1917	Antaeus	United Kingdom	3,061	Sunk
5 November 1917	Amberton	United Kingdom	4,556	Damaged
9 November 1917	Rizal	United States	2,744	Sunk
19 December 1917	S. Giuseppe B.	Kingdom of Italy	96	Sunk
21 December 1917	City Of Lucknow	United Kingdom	8,293	Sunk
25 December 1917	Sant’ Antonio	Kingdom of Italy	843	Sunk
1 January 1918	Egyptian Transport	United Kingdom	4,648	Damaged
3 January 1918	Allanton	United Kingdom	4,253	Sunk
3 January 1918	Steelville	United Kingdom	3,649	Sunk
7 January 1918	Arab	United Kingdom	4,191	Sunk
22 March 1918	Saint Jean II	France	2,457	Sunk
22 March 1918	Shadwell	United Kingdom	4,091	Damaged
26 March 1918	Volturno	Kingdom of Italy	11,495	Sunk
6 April 1918	Madeleine III	French Navy	149	Sunk
11 April 1918	Carmela G	Kingdom of Italy	41	Sunk
11 April 1918	Highland Prince	United Kingdom	3,390	Sunk
17 May 1918	Elswick Grange	United Kingdom	3,926	Damaged
17 May 1918	Mavisbrook	United Kingdom	3,152	Sunk
19 May 1918	Kirstine Jensen	Denmark	168	Sunk
20 May 1918	New Sweden	Sweden	5,319	Sunk
22 May 1918	Maria Pia	Kingdom of Italy	180	Damaged
25 May 1918	Amiral Lafont	France	117	Sunk
25 May 1918	Santa Teresa	Kingdom of Italy	257	Sunk
13 July 1918	Imber	United Kingdom	2,514	Damaged
16 July 1918	War Swallow	United Kingdom	5,216	Sunk
19 July 1918	Adria 1	Kingdom of Italy	1,809	Sunk
21 July 1918	Upada	United Kingdom	5,257	Damaged
23 July 1918	Messidor	United Kingdom	3,883	Sunk
24 July 1918	Rutherglen	United Kingdom	4,214	Sunk
25 July 1918	Magellan	United Kingdom	3,642	Sunk
27 July 1918	Antonio S.	Kingdom of Italy	175	Sunk
9 November 1918	HMS Britannia	Royal Navy	16,350	Sunk

== Bibliography ==
- Burt, R. A (1988). British Battleships 1889–1904. Annapolis, Maryland: Naval Institute Press. ISBN 0-87021-061-0.
- Gardiner, Robert; Gray, Randal, eds. (1985). Conway's All the World's Fighting Ships 1906–1921. Annapolis, Maryland: Naval Institute Press. ISBN 978-0-87021-907-8. OCLC 12119866.
- Bendert, Harald (2000). Die UB-Boote der Kaiserlichen Marine, 1914-1918. Einsätze, Erfolge, Schicksal (in German). Hamburg: Verlag E.S. Mittler & Sohn GmbH. ISBN 3-8132-0713-7.
- Gröner, Erich; Jung, Dieter; Maass, Martin (1991). German Warships 1815–1945, U-boats and Mine Warfare Vessels. Vol. 2. Translated by Thomas, Keith; Magowan, Rachel. London: Conway Maritime Press. ISBN 0-85177-593-4.
- Rössler, Eberhard (1979). Die deutschen U-Boote und ihre Werften: eine Bilddokumentation über den deutschen U-Bootbau; in zwei Bänden (in German). Vol. I. Munich: Bernard & Graefe. ISBN 3-7637-5213-7.
