= SM UC-53 =

1916 German type UC II minelaying U-boat

History

German Empire
- Name: UC-53
- Ordered: 12 January 1916
- Builder: Germaniawerft, Kiel
- Yard number: 269
- Launched: 27 February 1917
- Commissioned: 5 April 1917
- Fate: Scuttled at Pola, 28 October 1918

General characteristics
- Class & type: Type UC II submarine
- Displacement: 434 t (427 long tons), surfaced; 511 t (503 long tons), submerged
- Length: 52.69 m (172 ft 10 in) o/a; 40.96 m (134 ft 5 in) pressure hull
- Beam: 5.22 m (17 ft 2 in) o/a; 3.65 m (12 ft) pressure hull
- Draught: 3.64 m (11 ft 11 in)
- Propulsion: 2 × propeller shafts; 2 × 6-cylinder, 4-stroke diesel engines, 580–600 PS (430–440 kW; 570–590 shp); 2 × electric motors, 620 PS (460 kW; 610 shp)
- Speed: 11.8 knots (21.9 km/h; 13.6 mph), surfaced; 7.2 knots (13.3 km/h; 8.3 mph), submerged
- Range: 8,820–9,450 nmi (16,330–17,500 km; 10,150–10,870 mi) at 7 knots (13 km/h; 8.1 mph) surfaced; 56 nmi (104 km; 64 mi) at 4 knots (7.4 km/h; 4.6 mph) submerged
- Test depth: 50 m (160 ft)
- Complement: 26
- Armament: 6 × 100 cm (39.4 in) mine tubes; 18 × UC 200 mines; 3 × 50 cm (19.7 in) torpedo tubes (2 bow/external; one stern); 7 × torpedoes; 1 × 8.8 cm (3.5 in) Uk L/30 deck gun
- Notes: 30-second diving time

Service record
- Part of: Mittelmeer / Mittelmeer II Flotilla; 24 June 1917 – 28 October 1918
- Commanders: Kptlt. Kurt Albrecht; 5 April 1917 – 5 February 1918; Oblt.z.S. Adolf Ehrensberger; 6 February – 18 June 1918; Kptlt. Erich Gerth; 19 June – 28 October 1918
- Operations: 8 patrols
- Victories: 47 merchant ships sunk (46,469 GRT); 11 merchant ships damaged (31,612 GRT); 1 auxiliary warship damaged (120 GRT)

SM UC-53 was a German Type UC II minelaying submarine or U-boat in the German Imperial Navy (German: Kaiserliche Marine) during World War I. The U-boat was ordered on 12 January 1916 and was launched on 27 February 1917. She was commissioned into the German Imperial Navy on 5 April 1917 as SM UC-53. (Note: "SM" stands for "Seiner Majestät" (English: His Majesty's) and combined with the U for Unterseeboot would be translated as His Majesty's Submarine.) In eight patrols UC-53 was credited with sinking 47 ships, either by torpedo or by mines laid. UC-53 was scuttled at Pola on 28 October 1918 on the surrender of Austria-Hungary.

== Design ==
A Type UC II submarine, UC-53 had a displacement of 434 tonnes (427 long tons) when at the surface and 511 tonnes (503 long tons) while submerged. She had a length overall of 52.69 m (172 ft 10 in), a beam of 5.22 m (17 ft 2 in), and a draught of 3.64 m (11 ft 11 in). The submarine was powered by two six-cylinder four-stroke diesel engines each producing 290–300 metric horsepower (210–220 kW; 290–300 shp) (a total of 580–600 metric horsepower (430–440 kW; 570–590 shp)), two electric motors producing 620 metric horsepower (460 kW; 610 shp), and two propeller shafts. She had a dive time of 48 seconds and was capable of operating at a depth of 50 metres (160 ft).

The submarine had a maximum surface speed of 11.8 knots (21.9 km/h; 13.6 mph) and a submerged speed of 7.2 knots (13.3 km/h; 8.3 mph). When submerged, she could operate for 56 nautical miles (104 km; 64 mi) at 4 knots (7.4 km/h; 4.6 mph); when surfaced, she could travel 8,820 to 9,450 nautical miles (16,330 to 17,500 km; 10,150 to 10,870 mi) at 7 knots (13 km/h; 8.1 mph). UC-53 was fitted with six 100 centimetres (39 in) mine tubes, eighteen UC 200 mines, three 50 centimetres (20 in) torpedo tubes (one on the stern and two on the bow), seven torpedoes, and one 8.8 cm (3.5 in) Uk L/30 deck gun. Her complement was twenty-six crew members.

== Summary of raiding history ==
Date	Name	Nationality	Tonnage (Note: Merchant ship tonnages are in gross register tons. Military vessels are listed by tons displacement.)	Fate
4 June 1917	City of Baroda	United Kingdom	5,032	Sunk
9 June 1917	Lilly	Denmark	1,150	Sunk
9 June 1917	Tordenvore	Norway	1,565	Sunk
10 June 1917	Ligeiro	Portugal	285	Damaged
10 June 1917	Santa Maria	Portugal	204	Sunk
11 June 1917	Sibens	Russian Empire	323	Sunk
12 June 1917	Symra	Norway	3,005	Sunk
16 June 1917	Esperanza	Spain	98	Sunk
16 June 1917	F.7.SB.	Spain	50	Sunk
21 June 1917	Nord	France	3,193	Damaged
9 August 1917	Canara	United Kingdom	6,012	Damaged
10 August 1917	Margherita	Kingdom of Italy	66	Sunk
10 August 1917	Tito Speri	Kingdom of Italy	3,893	Sunk
13 August 1917	Arcangelo Michele	Kingdom of Italy	45	Sunk
12 August 1917	Ansedonia	Kingdom of Italy	270	Sunk
12 August 1917	Ardita Carrara	Kingdom of Italy	75	Sunk
13 August 1917	Il Nuovo Leonardo	Kingdom of Italy	34	Sunk
15 September 1917	Cavi	Kingdom of Italy	2,544	Damaged
18 September 1917	Domenico Primo	Kingdom of Italy	80	Damaged
19 September 1917	Teresita	Kingdom of Italy	136	Sunk
21 September 1917	Christina	Kingdom of Italy	32	Sunk
22 September 1917	Primo	Kingdom of Italy	65	Sunk
23 September 1917	Argietta	Kingdom of Italy	165	Sunk
23 September 1917	Giuseppina Concettina	Kingdom of Italy	31	Sunk
23 September 1917	Irthington	United Kingdom	2,845	Sunk
24 September 1917	Nuova Francesca	Kingdom of Italy	45	Sunk
24 September 1917	S. Espedito	Kingdom of Italy	31	Sunk
8 December 1917	Giuseppe Naccari	Kingdom of Italy	128	Sunk
9 December 1917	Cerea	Kingdom of Italy	4,295	Damaged
9 December 1917	Costas	Greece	3,278	Sunk
10 December 1917	Antonio Magliulo	Kingdom of Italy	520	Sunk
13 December 1917	Karen	Norway	1,689	Sunk
14 December 1917	HMS Brig 1	Royal Navy	120	Damaged
25 December 1917	Hekla	Denmark	937	Sunk
25 January 1918	Carignano	Kingdom of Italy	2,688	Sunk
26 January 1918	Asimina	Greece	2,878	Sunk
29 January 1918	Geo	United Kingdom	3,048	Sunk
30 January 1918	Fratelli Barrera	Kingdom of Italy	88	Sunk
30 January 1918	Michele Padre	Kingdom of Italy	230	Sunk
24 March 1918	La Nuova Felice	Kingdom of Italy	72	Sunk
24 March 1918	Nuovo Genio	Kingdom of Italy	35	Sunk
24 March 1918	Regina Immacolata	Kingdom of Italy	36	Sunk
24 March 1918	Tre Sorelle Salvo	Kingdom of Italy	26	Sunk
27 March 1918	Castrenzo Coppola	Kingdom of Italy	94	Sunk
4 June 1918	Michelangelo	Kingdom of Italy	2,456	Damaged
8 June 1918	Concettina	Kingdom of Italy	1,271	Sunk
8 June 1918	La Bayonnaise	France	2,425	Sunk
10 June 1918	Brodholme	United Kingdom	5,747	Damaged
22 September 1918	Gorsemore	United Kingdom	3,079	Sunk
28 September 1918	Caraibe	France	2,976	Damaged
30 September 1918	Francesco Padre	Kingdom of Italy	101	Sunk
30 September 1918	Gabriela Costela	Kingdom of Italy	105	Sunk
30 September 1918	Giovanni Costa	Kingdom of Italy	102	Sunk
30 September 1918	San Francesco P.	Kingdom of Italy	41	Sunk
1 October 1918	Giuseppino M.	Kingdom of Italy	48	Sunk
1 October 1918	S. Giuseppe A.	Kingdom of Italy	56	Sunk
5 October 1918	Rosa	Kingdom of Italy	908	Damaged
20 November 1918	War Typhoon	United Kingdom	3,116	Damaged
15 January 1919	Chaouia	France	4,334	Sunk
