= German submarine U-52 =

U-52 may refer to one of the following German submarines:

- SM U-52, a Type U 51 submarine launched in 1915 and that served in the First World War until surrendered 21 November 1918; broken up at Swansea in 1922
  - During the First World War, Germany also had these submarines with similar names:
    - SM UB-52, a Type UB III submarine launched in 1917 and sunk on 23 May 1918
    - SM UC-52, a Type UC II submarine launched in 1916 and surrendered on 16 January 1919; broken up at Morecambe in 1922
- German submarine U-52 (1939), a Type VIIB submarine that served in the Second World War until stricken October 1943; scuttled 3 May 1945
