= SM UC-42 =

German Type UC II minelaying U-boat

Coordinates: 51°44′N 08°12′W

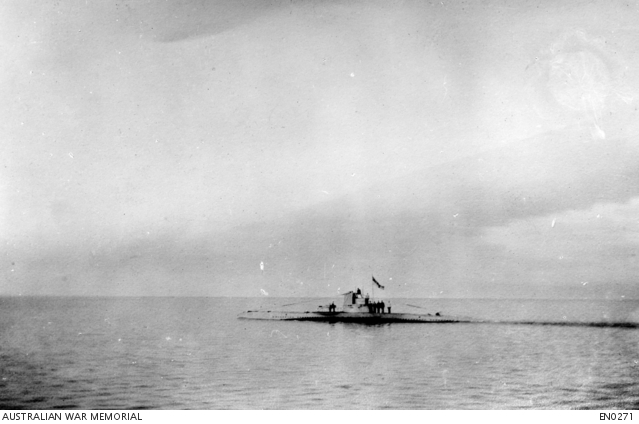

History

German Empire
- Name: UC-42
- Ordered: 20 November 1915
- Builder: AG Vulcan, Hamburg
- Yard number: 75
- Launched: 21 September 1916
- Commissioned: 18 November 1916
- Fate: Sunk by own mine, 10 September 1917

General characteristics
- Class & type: Type UC II submarine
- Displacement: 400 t (390 long tons), surfaced; 480 t (470 long tons), submerged
- Length: 49.45 m (162 ft 3 in) o/a; 40.30 m (132 ft 3 in) pressure hull
- Beam: 5.22 m (17 ft 2 in) o/a; 3.65 m (12 ft) pressure hull
- Draught: 3.68 m (12 ft 1 in)
- Propulsion: 2 × propeller shafts; 2 × 6-cylinder, 4-stroke diesel engines, 520 PS (380 kW; 510 shp); 2 × electric motors, 460 PS (340 kW; 450 shp)
- Speed: 11.7 knots (21.7 km/h; 13.5 mph), surfaced; 6.7 knots (12.4 km/h; 7.7 mph), submerged
- Range: 9,410 nmi (17,430 km; 10,830 mi) at 7 knots (13 km/h; 8.1 mph) surfaced; 60 nmi (110 km; 69 mi) at 4 knots (7.4 km/h; 4.6 mph) submerged
- Test depth: 50 m (160 ft)
- Complement: 26
- Armament: 6 × 100 cm (39.4 in) mine tubes; 18 × UC 200 mines; 3 × 50 cm (19.7 in) torpedo tubes (2 bow/external; one stern); 7 × torpedoes; 1 × 8.8 cm (3.5 in) Uk L/30 deck gun
- Notes: 48-second diving time

Service record
- Part of: I Flotilla; 1 January – 10 September 1917
- Commanders: Kptlt. Otto Heinrich Tornow; 18 November 1916 – 17 July 1917; Oblt.z.S. Hans Albrecht Müller; 18 July – 10 September 1917
- Operations: 6 patrols
- Victories: 13 merchant ships sunk (9,642 GRT); 1 auxiliary warship sunk (235 GRT); 1 warship damaged (1,210 tons)

SM UC-42 was a German Type UC II minelaying submarine or U-boat in the German Imperial Navy (German: Kaiserliche Marine) during World War I. The U-boat was ordered on 20 November 1915 and was launched on 21 September 1916. She was commissioned into the German Imperial Navy on 18 November 1916 as SM UC-42. (Note: "SM" stands for "Seiner Majestät" (English: His Majesty's) and combined with the U for Unterseeboot would be translated as His Majesty's Submarine.)

== Design ==
A Type UC II submarine, UC-42 had a displacement of 400 tonnes (390 long tons) when at the surface and 480 tonnes (470 long tons) while submerged. She had a length overall of 49.45 m (162 ft 3 in), a beam of 5.22 m (17 ft 2 in), and a draught of 3.68 m (12 ft 1 in). The submarine was powered by two six-cylinder four-stroke diesel engines each producing 260 metric horsepower (190 kW; 260 shp) (a total of 520 metric horsepower (380 kW; 510 shp)), two electric motors producing 460 metric horsepower (340 kW; 450 shp), and two propeller shafts. She had a dive time of 48 seconds and was capable of operating at a depth of 50 metres (160 ft).

The submarine had a maximum surface speed of 11.7 knots (21.7 km/h; 13.5 mph) and a submerged speed of 6.7 knots (12.4 km/h; 7.7 mph). When submerged, she could operate for 60 nautical miles (110 km; 69 mi) at 4 knots (7.4 km/h; 4.6 mph); when surfaced, she could travel 9,410 nautical miles (17,430 km; 10,830 mi) at 7 knots (13 km/h; 8.1 mph). UC-42 was fitted with six 100 centimetres (39 in) mine tubes, eighteen UC 200 mines, three 50 centimetres (20 in) torpedo tubes (one on the stern and two on the bow), seven torpedoes, and one 8.8 cm (3.5 in) Uk L/30 deck gun. Her complement was twenty-six crew members.

== Service ==
In a career that encompassed six patrols, operating from 1 January 1917, UC-42 succeeded in sinking fourteen vessels totaling 9,877 GRT, and disabling a warship of 1,210 tons displacement.

=== Fate ===
UC-42 sailed on her last patrol on 1 September 1917.

On 31 October 1917 Torpedo Boat TB 055 was accompanying minesweepers operating at the entrance to Cork harbour. At 1500 hours an oil track was seen floating on the surface of the water. Following it to its source, TB 055 used its hydrophone to see if the oil was coming from a submarine. Loud mechanical sounds, of "hammering" and "turbine-like noises" were reported and, believing this to be a U-boat, a marker buoy was dropped, followed shortly after by a depth charge. Following detonation of the charge, TB 055 returned to the area and found that the volume of floating oil had increased, and there were bubbles rising to the surface.

TB 055 signalled the nearby armed minesweeper HMT Sarba for assistance. Sarba used her hydrophone but detected no sounds from the presumed submarine. A second depth charge was dropped and Sarba remained on station overnight. The following morning HMD Sunshine and TB 058 swept around the spot, to confirm that the incident had not been a false alarm caused by old wreckage. On 2 November oil was still coming to the surface and dockyard divers arrived to inspect the assumed wreck. The divers reported a German U-boat lying on the seabed with her stern blown off, and a brass plate on her conning tower reading "C42, 1916" identified her as UC-42. No survivors were ever reported even though some of the hatches were found to have been opened. It was thought likely that the submarine had been sunk by one of her own mines detonating under her stern while minelaying.

When the sinking and identification of the submarine was reported, the British Admiralty requested an identifiable item from the vessel for verification purposes, and in December 1917 divers recovered the telephone buoy from the conning tower. The Royal Navy's Naval Intelligence Department were aware of submarine's 1 September departure date from Belgium and were sceptical about the hammering and engine noises reported by TB 055. The Admiralty reported that "The longest known cruise of a UC boat in home waters is 24 days, so UC-42 must have been dead long before TB 055 and Sarba dropped the depth charges".

== Rediscovery ==
The wreck was relocated on 6 November 2010 by Irish divers Ian Kelleher, Niall O'Regan, Philip Johnston, Eoin McGarry and Timmy Carey in just 27 metres (89 ft) of water off Roche's Point Co. Cork. It was found with "little obvious explosive damage". A serial number stamped on one of the propellers allowed positive identification as the UC-42. A supposed propeller was discovered 15 meters from the submarine in 2022 was raised in 2024.

A commemorative plaque was subsequently attached to the boat's stern and under International Maritime Law she is now a War Grave, untouchable and the responsibility of the Deutsche Marine.

== Summary of raiding history ==
Date	Name	Nationality	Tonnage (Note: Merchant ship tonnages are in gross register tons. Military vessels are listed by tons displacement.)	Fate
22 February 1917	Frolic	United Kingdom	183	Sunk
22 February 1917	Lord Collingwood	United Kingdom	148	Sunk
28 March 1917	Urania	Norway	1,688	Sunk
29 March 1917	Ruby	United Kingdom	234	Sunk
31 March 1917	HMS Carnation	Royal Navy	1,210	Damaged
4 May 1917	Sophie	Denmark	64	Sunk
5 May 1917	Angela	United Kingdom	122	Sunk
6 May 1917	Hebble	United Kingdom	904	Sunk
9 May 1917	Kitty	United Kingdom	181	Sunk
17 June 1917	Lizzie Westoll	United Kingdom	2,855	Sunk
12 July 1917	HMT George Milburn	Royal Navy	235	Sunk
6 August 1917	Baysoto	United Kingdom	3,082	Sunk
14 August 1917	Jane S.	United Kingdom	12	Sunk
5 September 1917	Glynn	United Kingdom	78	Sunk
5 September 1917	Industry	United Kingdom	91	Sunk
