= SM U-52 =

German U-boat in World War I

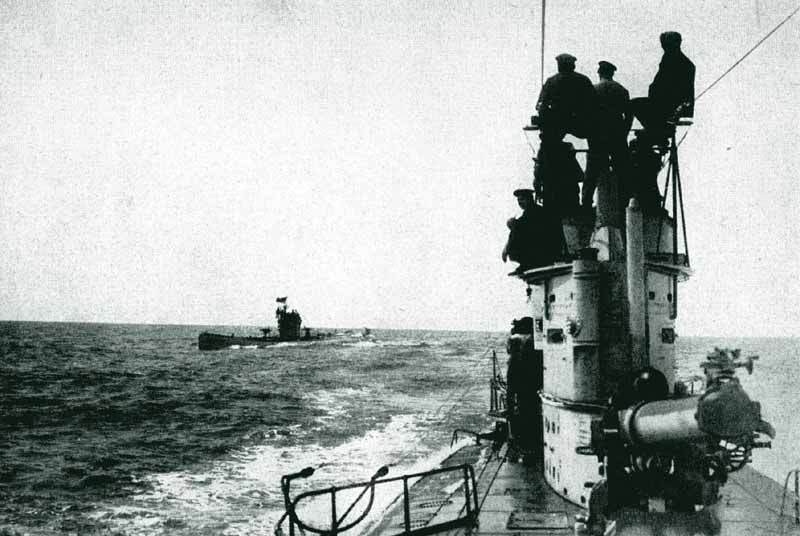
- SM U-52 (right) meeting U-35 (left)

History

German Empire
- Name: U-52
- Ordered: 23 August 1914
- Builder: Germaniawerft, Kiel
- Yard number: 234
- Laid down: 13 March 1915
- Launched: 8 December 1915
- Commissioned: 16 March 1916
- Fate: 21 November 1918 – surrendered. Broken up at Swansea in 1919.

General characteristics
- Class & type: Type U 51 submarine
- Displacement: 715 t (704 long tons) surfaced; 902 t (888 long tons) submerged
- Length: 65.20 m (213 ft 11 in) (o/a); 52.51 m (172 ft 3 in) (pressure hull)
- Beam: 6.44 m (21 ft 2 in) (oa); 4.18 m (13 ft 9 in) (pressure hull)
- Height: 7.82 m (25 ft 8 in)
- Draught: 3.64 m (11 ft 11 in)
- Installed power: 2 × 2,400 PS (1,765 kW; 2,367 shp) surfaced; 2 × 1,200 PS (883 kW; 1,184 shp) submerged
- Propulsion: 2 shafts
- Speed: 17.1 knots (31.7 km/h; 19.7 mph) surfaced; 9.1 knots (16.9 km/h; 10.5 mph) submerged
- Range: 9,400 nmi (17,400 km; 10,800 mi) at 8 knots (15 km/h; 9.2 mph) surfaced; 55 nmi (102 km; 63 mi) at 5 knots (9.3 km/h; 5.8 mph) submerged
- Test depth: 50 m (164 ft 1 in)
- Complement: 36
- Armament: 4 × 50 cm (19.7 in) torpedo tubes (two bow, two stern); 7 torpedoes; 2 × 8.8 cm (3.5 in) SK L/30 deck guns

Service record
- Part of: I Flotilla; Unknown start – 25 May 1916; II Flotilla; 25 May – 24 December 1916; Pola Flotilla; 24 December 1916 – 27 April 1917; II Flotilla; 27 April 1917 – 11 November 1918
- Commanders: Kptlt. Hans Walther; 8 May 1916 – 18 September 1917; Oblt.z.S. Johannes Spieß; 19 September – 29 October 1917; Kptlt. Siegfried Claaßen; 17 November – 28 February 1917; Kptlt. Waldemar Haumann; 1 March – 5 May 1918; Kptlt. Franz Krapohl; 6 May – 11 November 1918
- Operations: 4 patrols
- Victories: 26 merchant ships sunk (69,444 GRT); 3 warships sunk (18,471 tons); 3 auxiliary warships sunk (1,091 GRT); 3 merchant ships damaged (12,201 GRT); 1 warship damaged (1,250 tons); 1 auxiliary warship damaged (256 GRT)

SM U-52 was one of 329 submarines serving in the Imperial German Navy in World War I. U-52 was engaged in the naval warfare and took part in the First Battle of the Atlantic.

U-52 was noted for sinking two notable warships, the first notable warship (and second kill) being the Royal Navy's light cruiser HMS Nottingham, sunk in the North Sea on 19 August 1916 at 55°34′N 00°12′E. Thirty-eight men were lost. The sinking of Nottingham was an important event in the German Imperial Navy's action of August 19. At that time Otto Ciliax was watch officer on board the submarine. He later became an admiral in the Kriegsmarine.

U-52's second notable warship kill was the French battleship Suffren, sunk 90 miles (140 km) west of Portugal at 39°30′N 11°00′W. on 26 November 1916. All 648 men were lost as the torpedo ignited a magazine and the ship sank within seconds.

U-52 was surrendered to the Allies at Harwich on 21 November 1918 in accordance with the requirements of the Armistice with Germany. She was sold by the British Admiralty to George Cohen on 3 March 1919 for £2,400 (£107,100 in 2025) (excluding her engines), and was broken up at Swansea.

One of the ordinary seamen on board U-52 was Julius Schopka (1896–1965). After the war he emigrated to Iceland and became an Icelandic citizen. In 1928, together with Icelandic journalist Árni Óla he published his memoirs from the war years, in Icelandic, Kafbátahernaðurinn (The Submarine Warfare). That book was in turn used by Icelandic author Illugi Jökulsson when he published the book Úr undirdjúpunum til Íslands — Julius Schopka, U-52 og heimsstyrjöldin fyrri (From the Depths to Iceland — Julius Schopka, U-52 and the First World War) in 2019. Illugi also used the unpublished memoirs of Hans Walther, who was captain of the U-52 for most of her operational time.

== Summary of raiding history ==
Date	Name	Nationality	Tonnage (Note: Merchant ship tonnages are in gross register tons. Military vessels are listed by tons displacement.)	Fate
11 July 1916	HMT Onward	Royal Navy	266	Sunk
19 August 1916	HMS Nottingham	Royal Navy	5,400	Sunk
26 September 1916	HMY Conqueror II	Royal Navy	526	Sunk
26 September 1916	HMT Sarah Alice	Royal Navy	299	Sunk
26 September 1916	St. Gothard	United Kingdom	2,788	Sunk
25 November 1916	Egyptiana	United Kingdom	3,818	Damaged
25 November 1916	Suffren	French Navy	12,750	Sunk
10 December 1916	Emma Laurans	France	2,153	Sunk
30 March 1917	Michelina Catalano	Italy	78	Sunk
4 April 1917	Missourian	United States	7,924	Sunk
4 April 1917	Ravenna	Italy	4,101	Sunk
5 April 1917	Angel Marina	Italy	257	Sunk
7 April 1917	Seward	United States	2,471	Sunk
8 April 1917	Alba	Italy	1,639	Sunk
9 April 1917	Esterel	France	2,574	Sunk
11 April 1917	Ansgar	Denmark	301	Sunk
12 April 1917	Glencliffe	United Kingdom	3,673	Sunk
14 April 1917	Tres Macs	Portugal	163	Sunk
15 April 1917	Cabo Blanco	Spain	2,163	Damaged
16 April 1917	Crios	Greece	4,116	Sunk
19 April 1917	Senhora Da Conceicao	Portugal	206	Sunk
20 April 1917	Caithness	United Kingdom	3,500	Sunk
21 April 1917	HMS Heather	Royal Navy	1,250	Damaged
23 April 1917	Acadia	Norway	1,556	Sunk
6 July 1917	Flora	Norway	818	Sunk
9 July 1917	Prince Abbas	United Kingdom	2,030	Sunk
11 July 1917	Vanda	Sweden	1,646	Sunk
12 July 1917	Fredrika	Sweden	1,851	Sunk
17 July 1917	HMS C34	Royal Navy	321	Sunk
20 August 1917	Bulysses	United Kingdom	6,127	Sunk
1 September 1917	Tarapaca	France	2,506	Sunk
2 September 1917	Wentworth	United Kingdom	3,828	Sunk
4 September 1917	Peerless	United Kingdom	3,112	Sunk
5 September 1917	Echunga	United Kingdom	6,285	Sunk
5 September 1917	San Dunstano	United Kingdom	6,220	Damaged
11 September 1917	Tobol	Russia	3,741	Sunk
16 August 1918	HMT Fylde	Royal Navy	256	Damaged

== Bibliography ==
- Gröner, Erich; Jung, Dieter; Maass, Martin (1991). U-boats and Mine Warfare Vessels. German Warships 1815–1945. Vol. 2. Translated by Thomas, Keith; Magowan, Rachel. London: Conway Maritime Press. ISBN 0-85177-593-4.
