= Small nucleolar RNA SNORD52 =

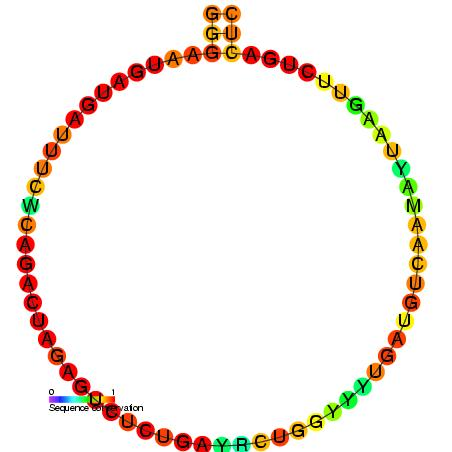
- Predicted secondary structure and sequence conservation of SNORD52

Identifiers
- Symbol: SNORD52
- Alt. Symbols: U52
- Rfam: RF00276

Other data
- RNA type: Gene; snRNA; snoRNA; C/D-box
- Domain: Eukaryota
- GO: GO:0006396 GO:0005730
- SO: SO:0000593
- PDB structures: PDBe

In molecular biology, snoRNA U52 (also known as SNORD52) is a non-coding RNA (ncRNA) molecule which functions in the modification of other small nuclear RNAs (snRNAs). This type of modifying RNA is usually located in the nucleolus of the eukaryotic cell which is a major site of snRNA biogenesis. It is known as a small nucleolar RNA (snoRNA) and also often referred to as a guide RNA.

snoRNA U52 belongs to the C/D box class of snoRNAs which contain the conserved sequence motifs known as the C box (UGAUGA) and the D box (CUGA). Most of the members of the box C/D family function in directing site-specific 2'-O-methylation of substrate RNAs.

U52 was originally cloned from HeLa cells and is predicted to guide the 2'O-ribose methylation of 28S ribosomal RNA (rRNA) residue U3904. U52 and the C/D box snoRNA U48 are encoded in the introns of the same host gene (C6orf48).
