= List of shipwrecks in May 1917 =

The list of shipwrecks in May 1917 includes ships sunk, foundered, grounded, or otherwise lost during May 1917.

== 1 May ==
List of shipwrecks: 1 May 1917
| Ship | State | Description |
|---|---|---|
| Acacia | France | World War I: The fishing vessel was sunk in the Bay of Biscay 7 nautical miles (13 km) off the Chassiron Lighthouse, Charente-Maritime by SM UC-72 (Imperial German Navy). Her crew survived. |
| Alide | Russia | World War I: The sailing vessel was sunk in the Atlantic Ocean off Land's End, Cornwall, United Kingdom by SM UC-75 (Imperial German Navy). |
| Antigone | France | World War I: The fishing vessel was sunk in the Bay of Biscay 8 nautical miles (15 km) off the Chassiron Lighthouse by SM UC-72 (Imperial German Navy). Her crew survived. |
| Bagdale | United Kingdom | World War I: The cargo ship was torpedoed and sunk in the English Channel 13 nautical miles (24 km) north east of Creac'h Point, Ouessant, Finistère, France (48°41′N 5°08′W) by SM UC-66 (Imperial German Navy) with the loss of 23 of her crew. |
| Barreiro | Portugal | World War I: The cargo ship was sunk in the Bay of Biscay 4 nautical miles (7.4 km) off Suances, Cantabria, Spain by SM UC-69 (Imperial German Navy). |
| British Sun | United Kingdom | World War I: The tanker was torpedoed and sunk in the Mediterranean Sea 230 nautical miles (430 km) east south east of Malta by SM UB-43 (Imperial German Navy). Her crew survived. |
| C. A. Jacques | United Kingdom | World War I: The cargo ship was torpedoed and sunk in the English Channel 26 nautical miles (48 km) west south west of Boulogne, Pas-de-Calais, France (50°27′N 1°04′E) by SM UB-18 (Imperial German Navy) with the loss of three of her crew. |
| Camille Amelin | France | World War I: The fishing vessel was sunk in the Bay of Biscay 6 nautical miles (11 km) off the Baleines Lighthouse, Charente-Maritime by SM UC-72 (Imperial German Navy). Her crew survived. |
| Dora | United Kingdom | World War I: The coaster was scuttled in the Irish Sea 11 nautical miles (20 km) west of the Mull of Galloway by SM UC-65 (Imperial German Navy). Her crew survived. |
| Gena | United Kingdom | World War I: The collier was torpedoed and sunk in the North Sea off Southwold, Suffolk by a Luftstreitkräfte aircraft. |
| Firelight | United Kingdom | World War I: The cargo ship was torpedoed and sunk in the North Sea (55°01′N 1°21′W) by SM UC-29 (Imperial German Navy). Her crew survived. |
| Imberhorne | Finland | World War I: The full-rigged ship was sunk in the Atlantic Ocean 130 nautical miles (240 km) north west by west of the Stags of Broadhaven, County Mayo, United Kingdom (54°07′N 13°04′W) by SM UC-73 (Imperial German Navy). |
| Ladywood | United Kingdom | World War I: The cargo ship was scuttled in the Atlantic Ocean 15 nautical miles (28 km) south west of the Wolf Rock, Cornwall (49°52′N 5°59′W) by SM UB-38 (Imperial German Navy). Her crew survived. |
| Helen | United Kingdom | World War I: The coaster was scuttled in the Irish Sea 11 nautical miles (20 km) west of the Mull of Galloway, Wigtownshire by SM UC-65 (Imperial German Navy). Her crew survived. |
| Ivrig | Norway | World War I: The barque was shelled and sunk in the Irish Sea 10 nautical miles (19 km) south west of Portpatrick, Wigtownshire by SM UC-65 (Imperial German Navy). Her crew survived. |
| John W. Pearn | United Kingdom | World War I: The schooner was scuttled in the English Channel 40 nautical miles (74 km) south south east of Start Point, Devon (49°42′N 2°58′W) by SM UC-66 (Imperial German Navy). Her crew survived. |
| La Manche | France | World War I: The barque was scuttled in the English Channel 8 nautical miles (15 km) north of the Les Hanois Lighthouse, Guernsey, Channel Islands by SM UC-66 (Imperial German Navy). Her crew survived. |
| Progress | United States | The barge sank in strong winds and rough seas off Ship John Light in the Delaware River. |
| Raymond Ester | France | World War I: The fishing vessel was sunk in the Atlantic Ocean 10 nautical miles (19 km) north west of Pendeen, Cornwall (50°15′N 5°53′W) by SM UC-48 (Imperial German Navy). |
| Rockingham | United States | World War I: The cargo ship was torpedoed and sunk in the Atlantic Ocean 150 nautical miles (280 km) west north west of Ireland (55°12′N 12°30′W) by SM U-69 (Imperial German Navy) with the loss of 2–13 of her crew, depending on sources. |
| San Urbano | United Kingdom | World War I: The tanker was torpedoed and sunk in the Atlantic Ocean 180 nautical miles (330 km) north west by north of the Fastnet Rock (51°33′N 13°38′W) by SM U-81 (Imperial German Navy) with the loss of four of her crew. |
| SM U-81 | Imperial German Navy | World War I: The Type U 81 submarine was torpedoed and sunk in the Atlantic Ocean west of Ireland (51°33′N 13°38′W) by HMS E54 (Royal Navy) with the loss of 24 of her crew. |
| W. D. Potts | United Kingdom | World War I: The schooner was shelled and sunk in the Irish Sea 10 nautical miles (19 km) south west of Portpatrick by SM UC-65 (Imperial German Navy). Her crew survived. |

== 2 May ==
List of shipwrecks: 2 May 1917
| Ship | State | Description |
|---|---|---|
| Alessandria | Italy | World War I: The cargo ship was sunk in the Mediterranean Sea 100 nautical miles (190 km) north of Benghazi, Libya by SM UC-74 (Imperial German Navy). |
| Amber | United Kingdom | World War I: The coaster was scuttled in the Irish Sea 2 nautical miles (3.7 km) Ballyhalbert, County Down by SM UC-65 (Imperial German Navy). Her crew survived. |
| Beeswing | United Kingdom | World War I: The barque was shelled and sunk in the Atlantic Ocean 140 nautical miles (260 km) west by north of the Fastnet Rock (50°50′N 13°00′W) by SM U-58 (Imperial German Navy). Her crew survived. |
| Camerata | United Kingdom | World War I: The cargo ship was torpedoed and damaged in the Mediterranean Sea off Djidjelli, Algeria by SM UC-37 (Imperial German Navy). She was beached but was later refloated. |
| Cancalais | France | World War I: The three-masted schooner was torpedoed and sunk in the Bay of Biscay 12 nautical miles (22 km) north west of the Île d'Yeu, Vendée (46°55′N 2°23′W) by SM UC-72 (Imperial German Navy). Her crew survived. |
| Certo | Norway | World War I: The cargo ship struck a mine and sank in the English Channel off Le Havre, Seine-Inférieure, France. Her crew survived. |
| Derrymore | United Kingdom | World War I: The coaster was scuttled in the Irish Sea off Ballyhalbert by SM UC-65 (Imperial German Navy). Some of her crew survived. |
| HMS Derwent | Royal Navy | World War I: The River-class destroyer struck a mine and sank in the English Channel off Le Havre (49°31′N 0°02′W) with the loss of 58 of her 70 crew. |
| Dione | Norway | World War I: The sailing vessel was sunk in the Atlantic Ocean south west of Ireland (50°39′N 11°45′W) by SM U-58 (Imperial German Navy). Her crew survived. |
| Earnest | United Kingdom | World War I: The schooner was scuttled in the Irish Sea 6 nautical miles (11 km) south east by south of the Skulmartin Lightship (United Kingdom) by SM UC-65 (Imperial German Navy). Her crew survived. |
| Gena | United Kingdom | World War I: The cargo ship was torpedoed and sunk in the North Sea off Aldeburgh, Suffolk by an Imperial German Air Corps aircraft. Her crew survived. |
| Juno | United Kingdom | World War I: The cargo ship was sunk in the English Channel 17 nautical miles (31 km) east of the Barfleur Lighthouse, Manche, France (49°48′N 0°51′W) by SM UB-18 (Imperial German Navy) with the loss of a crew member. |
| Keryado | French Navy | World War I: The naval trawler was torpedoed and sunk in the Bay of Biscay 12 nautical miles (22 km) north west of the Île d'Yeu (46°46′N 2°41′W) by SM UC-72 (Imperial German Navy) with the loss of all but one of her seventeen crew. |
| Morion | United Kingdom | World War I: The coaster was scuttled in the Irish Sea 4 nautical miles (7.4 km) south east of the Skulmartin Lightship (United Kingdom) by SM UC-65 (Imperial German Navy). Her crew survived. |
| Natuna | Norway | World War I: The barque was sunk in the Atlantic Ocean 70 nautical miles (130 km) west of the Shetland Islands, United Kingdom (59°50′N 3°10′W) by SM U-44 (Imperial German Navy). Her crew survived. |
| Nordzee | Netherlands | World War I: The koff was scuttled in the North Sea off the Noord Hinder Lightship (Netherlands) by SM UC-62 (Imperial German Navy). Her crew survived. |
| Rikard Noordrak | Norway | World War I: The cargo ship was sunk in the North Sea 9 nautical miles (17 km) south of Whitby, Yorkshire (54°23′N 0°22′W) by SM UB-21 (Imperial German Navy) with the loss of two of her crew. |
| Russie | France | World War I: The schooner was scuttled in the Bay of Biscay 12 nautical miles (22 km) north west of the Île d'Yeu (46°46′N 2°41′W) by SM UC-72 (Imperial German Navy). Her crew survived. |
| Saint Mungo | United Kingdom | World War I: The coaster was scuttled in the Irish Sea 2 nautical miles (3.7 km) north north east of the South Rock Lightship (United Kingdom) by SM UC-65 (Imperial German Navy). |
| Taizan Maru | Japan | World War I: The cargo ship was sunk in the Irish Sea 11 nautical miles (20 km) west of the Mull of Galloway (54°28′N 5°20′W) by SM UC-65 (Imperial German Navy). Her crew survived. |
| Tela | United Kingdom | World War I: The cargo ship was torpedoed and sunk in the English Channel 16 nautical miles (30 km) north east of Cape Barfleur, Manche (49°50′N 0°50′W) by SM UB-18 (Imperial German Navy). Her crew survived. |
| Troilus | United Kingdom | World War I: The cargo ship was torpedoed and sunk in the Atlantic Ocean 140 nautical miles (260 km) west north west of Malin Head, County Donegal (53°22′N 15°52′W) by SM U-69 (Imperial German Navy). Her crew survived. |
| United | United Kingdom | World War I: The fishing smack was scuttled in the Atlantic Ocean 5 nautical miles (9.3 km) off the Godrevy Lighthouse, Cornwall (50°13′N 5°53′W) by SM UC-48 (Imperial German Navy). Her crew survived. |
| Vanduara | Norway | World War I: The barque was shelled and sunk in the Atlantic Ocean south west of Ireland (50°24′N 14°59′W) by SM U-58 (Imperial German Navy). Her crew survived. |
| Victoire | France | World War I: The schooner was scuttled in the Bay of Biscay (46°46′N 2°41′W) by SM UC-72 (Imperial German Navy). Her crew survived. |
| Warnow | United Kingdom | World War I: The cargo ship was torpedoed and sunk in the Atlantic Ocean 6 nautical miles (11 km) west of Trevose Head, Cornwall (50°30′N 5°10′W) by SM UC-48 (Imperial German Navy) with the loss of fourteen of her crew. |
| Westland | Netherlands | World War I: The fishing vessel was scuttled in the North Sea off the Terschelling Lightship (Netherlands) (53°47′N 4°21′E) by SM UC-71 (Imperial German Navy). Her crew survived. |
| Yvonne | France | World War I: The sailing vessel was sunk in the Bay of Biscay 12 nautical miles (22 km) north west of the Île d'Yeu (46°46′N 2°41′W) by SM UC-72 (Imperial German Navy). Her crew survived. |

== 3 May ==
List of shipwrecks: 3 May 1917
| Ship | State | Description |
|---|---|---|
| Antonio Sciesa | Italy | World War I: The cargo ship was sunk in the Ionian Sea 24 nautical miles (44 km) south south east of Sapientza, Greece (36°39′N 21°15′E) by SM U-14 (Austro-Hungarian Navy). Her crew survived. |
| Carberry King | United Kingdom | World War I: The drifter was scuttled in the English Channel 14 nautical miles (26 km) south of The Lizard, Cornwall (49°44′N 5°07′W) by SM UC-75 (Imperial German Navy). Her crew survived. |
| Clodmoor | United Kingdom | World War I: The cargo ship was torpedoed and sunk in the English Channel 5 nautical miles (9.3 km) south west of Newhaven, Sussex (50°43′N 0°01′W) by SM UB-40 (Imperial German Navy). Her crew survived. |
| Eleanor | United Kingdom | World War I: The fishing vessel was scuttled in the English Channel (49°45′N 5°07′W) by SM UC-75 (Imperial German Navy). |
| Fastnet | United Kingdom | World War I: The fishing vessel was scuttled in the English Channel (49°45′N 5°07′W) by SM UC-75 (Imperial German Navy). |
| Fils du Progres | France | World War I: The trawler was sunk in the Atlantic Ocean 3 nautical miles (5.6 km) south west of the Île de Sein, Finistère by SM UC-61 (Imperial German Navy). Her crew survived. |
| Frederick Knight | United Kingdom | World War I: The cargo ship was torpedoed and sunk in the Atlantic Ocean 115 nautical miles (213 km) north west by west of the Fastnet Rock (51°43′N 12°21′W) by SM U-62 (Imperial German Navy). Her crew survived. |
| Giovannina | Italy | World War I: The cargo ship was sunk in the Bay of Biscay 10 nautical miles (19 km) south west of Belle Île, Morbihan, France by SM UC-61 (Imperial German Navy). |
| Glen Tanar | United Kingdom | World War I: The coaster struck a mine and sank in the North Sea 1 nautical mile (1.9 km) north east of Girdle Ness, Aberdeenshire (57°10′N 2°02′W). Her crew survived. |
| Helge | Denmark | World War I: The schooner was scuttled in the North Sea (56°28′N 3°43′E) by SM UC-49 (Imperial German Navy). Her crew survived. |
| Hibernia | United Kingdom | World War I: The fishing vessel was sunk in the Atlantic Ocean 14 nautical miles (26 km) south east of Baltimore, County Cork by SM UC-75 (Imperial German Navy). |
| Lindisfarne | Russia | World War I: The full-rigged ship was scuttled in the Atlantic Ocean south west of Ireland (49°20′N 14°00′W) by SM U-21 (Imperial German Navy). |
| Lucky Lass | United Kingdom | The fishing vessel was scuttled in the English Channel (49°34′N 5°07′W) by SM UC-75 (Imperial German Navy). |
| Maria | Greece | World War I: The cargo ship was sunk in the Bay of Biscay by SM UC-69 (Imperial German Navy). Her crew survived. |
| Mezly | France | World War I: The barque was shelled and sunk in the Atlantic Ocean (50°15′N 15°36′W) by SM UC-73 (Imperial German Navy). Her crew survived. |
| Misurata | Italy | World War I: The cargo ship was shelled and sunk in the Atlantic Ocean 50°10′N 17°15′W) by SM UC-73 (Imperial German Navy). Her crew survived. |
| North Star | United Kingdom | World War I: The fishing vessel was scuttled in the English Channel (49°45′N 5°05′W) by SM UC-75 (Imperial German Navy). |
| Polstad | Norway | World War I: The cargo ship was sunk in the Atlantic Ocean off Cape Ortegal, Spain (43°43′N 7°06′W) by SM UC-69 (Imperial German Navy). Her crew survived. |
| Sir Edward Birkbeck | United Kingdom | World War I: The fishing vessel was scuttled in the English Channel by SM UC-75 (Imperial German Navy). Her crew survived. |
| Truvor | Russia | World War I: The cargo ship was torpedoed and sunk in the Barents Sea off Mys Zyp-Navolok (70°08′N 33°07′E) by SM U-45 (Imperial German Navy). Her crew survived. |
| Ussa | United Kingdom | World War I: The cargo ship struck a mine and sank in the English Channel 2.5 nautical miles (4.6 km) off Cherbourg, Seine-Inférieure, France by SM UC-26 (Imperial German Navy). Her crew survived. |
| Washington | United Kingdom | World War I: The cargo ship was torpedoed and sunk in the Gulf of Genoa 1.5 nautical miles (2.8 km) off Camogli, Liguria, Italy (44°14′N 9°07′E) by SM U-63 (Imperial German Navy). Her crew survived. |

== 4 May ==
List of shipwrecks: 4 May 1917
| Ship | State | Description |
|---|---|---|
| Aghios Nikolaos | Greece | World War I: The cargo ship was sunk in the English Channel 16 nautical miles (30 km) south east of Barfleur, Manche, France (49°43′N 0°54′W) by SM UB-38 (Imperial German Navy). Her crew survived. |
| Assos | Greece | World War I: The cargo ship was captured and scuttled in the English Channel 16 nautical miles (30 km) south east of Barfleur 49°43′N 0°54′W by SM UB-38 (Imperial German Navy). |
| Caméléon | French Navy | World War I: The naval whaler struck a mine and sank in the Gulf of Patras off Cape Pappas, Greece with the loss of a crew member. |
| Doctor Brooks | United States | The barge went ashore on Santa Rosa Island, Florida in a storm. Later refloated. |
| Francesco C. | Italy | World War I: the barque was scuttled in the Mediterranean Sea west of Sardinia (40°18′N 8°08′E) by SM U-34 (Imperial German Navy). |
| Herrington | United Kingdom | World War I: The collier struck a mine and sank in the North Sea 0.75 nautical miles (1.39 km) east south east of Red Head, Forfarshire (56°37′N 2°27′W). Her crew survived. |
| Ilva | Italy | World War I: The cargo ship was captured and scuttled in the Bay of Biscay 5 nautical miles (9.3 km) off Coelleira Island, Galicia, Spain by SM UC-69 (Imperial German Navy). Her crew survived. |
| Ioannis p. Goulandris | Greece | World War I: The cargo ship was sunk in the Bay of Biscay 23 nautical miles (43 km) east of the Punta de Estaca de Bares by SM UC-69 (Imperial German Navy). Her crew survived. |
| Jørgen Olsen | Denmark | World War I: The three-masted schooner was shelled and damaged in the Atlantic Ocean 30 nautical miles (56 km) west of Ireland by SM U-62 (Imperial German Navy). Her crew survived but she was declared a constructive total loss. |
| Joseph | United Kingdom | World War I: The brigantine was scuttled in the English Channel 20 nautical miles (37 km) north of Caen, Calvados, France (49°39′N 0°38′W) by SM UB-38 (Imperial German Navy). Her crew survived. |
| Locust | United States | The lighter sank near McQuestents Wharf, East Boston, Massachusetts. |
| HMT Lord Salisbury | Royal Navy | The naval trawler was lost on this date. |
| Marie | Denmark | World War I: The coaster was torpedoed and sunk in the North Sea off Aberdeen, United Kingdom (58°30′N 1°04′W) by SM UC-51 (Imperial German Navy) with the loss of two of her crew. |
| Marie | France | World War I: The sailing vessel was sunk in the Atlantic Ocean south of Ireland by SM UC-75 (Imperial German Navy). |
| Mamelena IX | Spain | World War I: The trawler was scuttled in the Bay of Biscay south west of the Contis Lighthouse, Landes, France by SM UC-72 (Imperial German Navy) |
| Mamelena XII | Spain | World War I: The trawler was scuttled in the Bay of Biscay south west of the Contis Lighthouse by SM UC-72 (Imperial German Navy). |
| Marne | French Navy | World War I: The naval trawler was shelled and sunk in the Bay of Biscay south west of the Contis Lighthouse by SM UC-72 (Imperial German Navy). Her crew survived. |
| Neptunus | Netherlands | World War I: The coaster was scuttled in the North Sea 10 nautical miles (19 km) north of the North Hinder Lightship (Netherlands) by SM UC-62 (Imperial German Navy). |
| New Design No.2 | United Kingdom | World War I: The schooner was scuttled in the Irish Sea 25 nautical miles (46 km) north by west of the South Bishop Lighthouse by SM UC-65 (Imperial German Navy). Her crew survived. |
| Pilar de Larrinaga | United Kingdom | World War I: The cargo ship was torpedeoed and sunk in the Atlantic Ocean 2 nautical miles (3.7 km) south east by south of the Tuskar Rock, Ireland (52°10′N 6°08′W) by SM UC-65 (Imperial German Navy) with the loss of twenty of her crew. |
| Sophie | Denmark | World War I: The sailing vessel was sunk in the North Sea by SM UC-42 (Imperial German Navy). |
| Strumble | United Kingdom | World War I: The fishing smack was scuttled in the Irish Sea 10 nautical miles (19 km) north north east of Strumble Head, Pembrokeshire by SM UC-65 (Imperial German Navy). Her crew survived. |
| Transylvania | United Kingdom | World War I: The troopship was torpedoed and sunk in the Gulf of Genoa 2.5 nautical miles (4.6 km) off Cape Vado, Liguria, Italy (44°15′N 8°30′E) by SM U-63 (Imperial German Navy) with the loss of 402 lives. |
| Tromp | Norway | World War I: The cargo ship was sunk in the Atlantic Ocean 2 nautical miles (3.7 km) off Rencardeida Point, Spain (43°46′N 7°34′W) by SM UC-69 (Imperial German Navy). Her crew survived. |
| Vale | Norway | World War I: The coaster was torpedoed and sunk in the North Sea 68 nautical miles (126 km) east by north of the Isle of May, Fife, United Kingdom (56°02′N 1°00′W) by SM UC-77 (Imperial German Navy) with the loss of three of her crew. |
| Verdun | France | World War I: The fishing vessel was shelled and sunk in the Bay of Biscay south west of the Contis Lighthouse by SM UC-72 (Imperial German Navy). Her crew survived. |
| Victorious | United Kingdom | World War I: The fishing vessel was scuttled in the Irish Sea 10 nautical miles (19 km) north north east of Strumble Head by SM UC-65 (Imperial German Navy). Her crew survived. |

== 5 May ==
List of shipwrecks: 5 May 1917
| Ship | State | Description |
|---|---|---|
| Angela | United Kingdom | World War I: The schooner struck a mine and sank in the North Sea 3 nautical miles (5.6 km) off the mouth of the River Tyne (54°59′N 1°19′W) with the loss of five of her crew. |
| Asra | Norway | World War I: The full-rigged ship was shelled and sunk in the Atlantic Ocean 140 nautical miles (260 km) west north west of Tory Island, County Donegal, United Kingdom (55°40′N 12°10′W) by SM U-58 (Imperial German Navy). Her crew survived. |
| Dina di Lozenzo | Italy | World War I: The sailing vessel was sunk in the Mediterranean Sea north of Bizerte, Algeria by SM UC-37 (Imperial German Navy). |
| Edith Cavell | United Kingdom | The trawler was scuttled in the North Sea off Robin Hood's Bay, Yorkshire by SM UB-21 (Imperial German Navy). |
| Feltria | United Kingdom | World War I: The passenger ship was torpedoed and sunk in the Atlantic Ocean 8 nautical miles (15 km) south east of Mine Head, County Cork (51°56′N 7°24′W) by SM UC-48 (Imperial German Navy) with the loss of 45 lives. |
| Greta | United Kingdom | World War I: The coaster was shelled and sunk in the Atlantic Ocean 11 nautical miles (20 km) south east of Mine Head, County Cork by SM UC-48 (Imperial German Navy). Her crew survived. |
| Harmattan | United Kingdom | World War I: The cargo ship struck a mine and sank in the Mediterranean Sea 30 nautical miles (56 km) off Cape Bon, Algeria with the loss of 36 of her crew. |
| HMS Lavender | Royal Navy | World War I: The Acacia-class sloop was sunk in the English Channel south of Mine Head, Cornwall by SM UC-75 (Imperial German Navy) with the loss of 22 of her 77 crew. |
| Lodes | United Kingdom | World War I: The coaster struck a mine and sank in the Irish Sea 4 nautical miles (7.4 km) south east of Ballycotton, County Cork with the loss of seven of her crew. |
| Morzh | Imperial Russian Navy | World War I: The Morzh-class submarine was sunk by mine off the coast of Turkey. The wreck discovery in 2002 confirmed the cause of loss. |
| Nydal | Norway | World War I: The cargo ship was sunk in the Bay of Biscay 25 nautical miles (46 km) west south west of the La Coubre Lighthouse, Charente-Maritime, France by SM UC-72 (Imperial German Navy). Her crew survived. |
| Odense | Denmark | World War I: The cargo ship was damaged in the North Sea 1.5 nautical miles (2.8 km) east north east of St Abb's Head, Berwickshire, United Kingdom (55°56′N 2°12′W) by SM UC-77 (Imperial German Navy) and was abandoned with the loss of two of her crew. Odense came ashore north of St Abb's Head and was declared a total loss. She sank on 2 August. |
| Segovia | Norway | World War I: The cargo ship was sunk in the North Sea 26 nautical miles (48 km) south south east of Auskerry, Orkney Islands, United Kingdom (58°38′N 2°00′W) by SM UC-51 (Imperial German Navy). Her crew survived. |
| Simon | Netherlands | World War I: The fishing vessel was shelled and sunk in the North Sea off the Terschelling Lightship (Netherlands) (53°31′N 3°40′E) by SM UC-71 (Imperial German Navy) with the loss of all eleven crew. |
| Snig | Norway | World War I: The barque was sunk in the Atlantic Ocean 200 nautical miles (370 km) west of Tory Island (54°08′N 13°36′W) by SM U-49 (Imperial German Navy). Her crew survived. |

== 6 May ==
List of shipwrecks: 6 May 1917
| Ship | State | Description |
|---|---|---|
| Adansi | United Kingdom | World War I: The Elder Dempster 2,644 GRT cargo ship was torpedoed and sunk in the Atlantic Ocean 80 nautical miles (150 km) west of the Fastnet Rock (50°40′N 11°05′W) by SM U-21 (Imperial German Navy) while en route from Sierra Leone to Liverpool. Her crew survived. |
| Annie H. Smith | United States | The schooner barge sank 25 miles (40 km) south west of the Fire Island Lightship, a total loss. The crew left in her lifeboat and were rescued by a steamer. |
| SMS Felix | Imperial German Navy | The Vorpostenboot was lost on this date. |
| Francesco | Italy | World War I: The cargo ship was sunk in the Bay of Biscay off the La Coubre Lighthouse, Charente-Maritime, France by SM UC-72 (Imperial German Navy). Her crew survived. |
| Gurth | Norway | World War I: The cargo ship was scuttled in the Bay of Biscay 1.5 nautical miles (2.8 km) off Vaca de Luanco, Spain (43°39′N 5°48′W) by SM UC-69 (Imperial German Navy). Her crew survived. |
| Harold | Sweden | World War I: The cargo ship was shelled and sunk in the North Sea 76 nautical miles (141 km) north east by north of the mouth of the River Tyne by SM UB-21 (Imperial German Navy) with the loss of five crew. |
| Hebble | United Kingdom | World War I: The coaster struck a mine and sank in the North Sea 1.5 nautical miles (2.8 km) east of Roker, County Durham (54°55′N 1°18′E) with the loss of five of her crew. |
| Kaparika | Norway | World War I: cargo ship was torpedoed and sunk in the North Sea 30 nautical miles (56 km) east of Aberdeen, United Kingdom by SM UC-77 (Imperial German Navy) with the loss of a crew member. |
| Poseidon I | Netherlands | World War I: The fishing vessel was shelled and sunk in the North Sea 9 nautical miles (17 km) north of the Dogger Bank North Lightship (United Kingdom) by SM UC-30 (Imperial German Navy). Her crew survived. |
| President | France | World War I: The barque was shelled and sunk in the Atlantic Ocean 12 nautical miles (22 km) west of Trevose Head, Cornwall, United Kingdom (50°31′N 5°21′W) by SM UC-75 (Imperial German Navy). Her crew survived. |
| Voss | Norway | World War I: The cargo ship was sunk in the Bay of Biscay 1.5 nautical miles (2.8 km) off Vaca de Luanco (43°39′N 5°47′W) by SM UC-69 (Imperial German Navy). Her crew survived. |

== 7 May ==
List of shipwrecks: 7 May 1917
| Ship | State | Description |
|---|---|---|
| Crown of Leon | United Kingdom | World War I: The cargo ship was torpedoed and damaged in the Gulf of Genoa (44°08′N 8°14′E) by SM U-63 (Imperial German Navy) with the loss of a crew member. She was beached but was torpedoed again on 16 May by SM U-32 (Imperial German Navy). |
| H. H. Petersen | Denmark | World War I: The barquentine was sunk in the Atlantic Ocean 20 to 25 nautical miles (37 to 46 km) west of St. Kilda, Inverness-shire, United Kingdom (57°30′N 9°00′W) by SM U-80 (Imperial German Navy). Her crew survived. |
| Kinross | United Kingdom | World War I: The cargo ship was torpedoed and sunk in the Atlantic Ocean 10 nautical miles (19 km) east of the Wolf Rock, Cornwall (49°49′N 5°33′W) by SM UC-48 (Imperial German Navy). Her crew survived. |
| Leikanger | Norway | World War I: The cargo ship was sunk in the Atlantic Ocean 5 nautical miles (9.3 km) west north west of the Machico Lighthouse, Spain, Spain by SM UC-69 (Imperial German Navy). Her crew survived. |
| Lowmount | United Kingdom | World War I: The cargo ship struck a mine and sank in the English Channel 4 nautical miles (7.4 km) off the Nab Lightship (United Kingdom) with the loss of five of her crew. |
| Martha Maria | Netherlands | World War I: The trawler was sunk in the North Sea (52°50′N 4°08′E) by SM UB-20 (Imperial German Navy). Her crew survived. |
| Maude | United Kingdom | World War I: The schooner was scuttled in the Irish Sea 8 nautical miles (15 km) south west of Bardsey Island, Pembrokeshire by SM UC-65 (Imperial German Navy). Her crew survived. |
| Polamhall | United Kingdom | World War I: The cargo ship was torpedoed and sunk in the Atlantic Ocean 80 nautical miles (150 km) west south west of the Bishop Rock, Isles of Scilly (49°02′N 8°04′W) by SM U-62 (Imperial German Navy). Her crew survived. |
| Prins Hendrik de Nederlande | Netherlands | World War I: The trawler was sunk in the North Sea (52°50′N 4°10′E) by SM UB-20 (Imperial German Navy). Her crew survived. |
| Repton | United Kingdom | World War I: The collier was torpedoed and sunk in the Mediterranean Sea 45 nautical miles (83 km) south south east of Cape Matapan, Greece (35°42′N 22°57′E) by SM UB-43 (Imperial German Navy) with the loss of three of her crew. |
| Sophie | Denmark | World War I: The schooner was sunk in the Atlantic Ocean 30 nautical miles (56 km) east south oeast of St. Kilda (57°40′N 9°05′W) by SM U-80 (Imperial German Navy). Her crew survived. |
| Tiger | Norway | World War I: The cargo ship was sunk in the Atlantic Ocean 3 nautical miles (5.6 km) west north west of Cabo Machico, Madeira (43°27′N 2°50′W) by SM UC-69 (Imperial German Navy). Her crew survived. |
| Tore Jarl | Norway | World War I: The cargo ship was sunk in the North Sea 95 nautical miles (176 km) south of Sumburgh Head, Shetland Islands, United Kingdom by SM UC-49 (Imperial German Navy) with the loss of a crew member. |
| SM UB-39 | Imperial German Navy | World War I: The Type UB II submarine struck a mine and sank in the North Sea (51°20′N 2°09′E) with the loss of all 24 crew. |
| HMY Zarefah | Royal Navy | World War I: The naval yacht struck a mine and sank in the North Sea 1 nautical mile (1.9 km) north east of Mull Head, Mainland, Orkney Islands with the loss of sixteen of her crew. |

== 8 May ==
List of shipwrecks: 8 May 1917
| Ship | State | Description |
|---|---|---|
| Iris | United Kingdom | World War I: The ketch was sunk in the English Channel off Cherbourg, Seine-Inférieure, France, probably by SM UC-26 (Imperial German Navy), with the loss of four of her crew. |
| Jos. F. Clinton or Joseph F. Clinton | United States | The schooner barge sank 12 miles (19 km) east south east of Hog Island or Chincoteague, Virginia, a total loss. |
| Killarney | United Kingdom | World War I: The barque was shelled and sunk in the Atlantic Ocean 200 nautical miles (370 km) west of the Fastnet Rock (50°55′N 14°44′W) by SM U-21 (Imperial German Navy). Her crew survived. |
| Nelly | France | World War I: The cargo ship was sunk in the Bay of Biscay 44 nautical miles (81 km) south south west of Penmarc'h, Finistère (47°18′N 4°55′W by SM UC-61 (Imperial German Navy) with the loss of a crew member. |
| Petunia | United Kingdom | World War I: The cargo ship was torpedoed and sunk in the Atlantic Ocean 45 nautical miles (83 km) west of the Bishop Rock, Isles of Scilly by SM U-49 (Imperial German Navy) with the loss of two crew. Three survivors were taken as prisoners of war. |
| SM UC-26 | Imperial German Navy | World War I: The Type UC II submarine was rammed and sunk in the English Channel off Calais, Pas-de-Calais, France (51°03′N 1°40′E) by HMS Milne (Royal Navy) with the loss of all 26 crew. |

== 9 May ==
List of shipwrecks: 9 May 1917
| Ship | State | Description |
|---|---|---|
| Dio ti Guardi | Italy | World War I: The fishing vessel was sunk in the Mediterranean Sea off Cape Rosello, Sicily by SM UC-35 (Imperial German Navy). |
| Hans Broge | Denmark | World War I: The cargo ship was sunk in the Atlantic Ocean 30 nautical miles (56 km) west of Teelin Head, County Donegal, United Kingdom (54°38′N 9°30′W) by SM U-80 (Imperial German Navy). Her crew survived. |
| Harpagus | United Kingdom | World War I: The cargo ship was torpedoed and sunk in the Mediterranean Sea 62 nautical miles (115 km) south west of the Île du Planier, Bouches-du-Rhône, France (42°32′N 4°39′E) by SM U-34 (Imperial German Navy) with the loss of three crew. Two crew were taken as prisoners of war. |
| Kitty | United Kingdom | World War I: The 105-foot (32 m), 181-ton steam trawler was captured and scuttled with explosives in the North Sea 30 nautical miles (56 km) east south east of St Abb's Head, Berwickshire (56°11′N 1°45′W) by SM UC-42 (Imperial German Navy). Her crew survived, but her Captain and Chief Engineer were taken as prisoners of war. |
| L'Oriente | Italy | World War I: The fishing vessel was scuttled in the Mediterranean Sea off Cape Rosello by SM UC-35 (Imperial German Navy). |
| Marchiena | Netherlands | World War I: The schooner was shelled and sunk in the English Channel off Beachy Head, Sussex, United Kingdom by SM UC-17 (Imperial German Navy). Her crew took to the lifeboats but were not rescued. |
| Mettlerkamp | Imperial German Navy | World War I: The Augustenburg-class Vorpostenboot was sunk by mines north of Borkum. |
| No. 1 | Imperial Russian Navy | World War I: The No. 1-class submarine was lost in the Barents Sea. |
| Peppino Aiello | Italy | World War I: The sailing vessel was sunk in the Mediterranean Sea off Cape Rosello by SM UC-35 (Imperial German Navy). |
| San Pietro | Italy | World War I: The fishing vessel was sunk in the Mediterranean Sea off Cape Rosello by SM UC-35 (Imperial German Navy). |
| Windward Ho! | United Kingdom | World War I: The trawler struck a mine and sank in the North Sea 3 nautical miles (5.6 km) south of Peterhead, Aberdeenshire (57°28′N 1°42′W) with the loss of eight of her crew. |

== 10 May ==
List of shipwrecks: 10 May 1917
| Ship | State | Description |
|---|---|---|
| Berangère | France | World War I: The full-rigged ship was shelled and sunk in the Atlantic Ocean south west of Ireland (50°06′N 11°30′W) by SM U-62 (Imperial German Navy). All 22 crew survived. |
| Broomhill | United Kingdom | World War I: The collier was scuttled in the English Channel 9 nautical miles (17 km) south west of Portland Bill, Dorset (50°25′N 2°32′W) by SM UC-61 (Imperial German Navy) with the loss of two of her crew. |
| Carmen | Spain | World War I: The three-masted schooner was scuttled in the Mediterranean Sea 12 nautical miles (22 km) south of Barcelona by SM U-34 (Imperial German Navy). |
| Dolcoath | United Kingdom | World War I: The cargo ship struck a mine and sank in the North Sea 3.25 nautical miles (6.02 km) north east of North Foreland, Kent (51°26′N 1°28′E) with the loss of a crew member. |
| Gazelle | Norway | World War I: The sailing ship was scuttled in the Atlantic Ocean 80 nautical miles (150 km) south west of the Fastnet Rock (49°45′N 10°50′W) by SM U-62 (Imperial German Navy). Her crew survived. |
| Gruno | Netherlands | World War I: The auxiliary sailing vessel was sunk in the North Sea 8 nautical miles (15 km) south south west of the Noord Hinder Lightship (Netherlands) by SM UC-63 (Imperial German Navy). |
| James Hogan | United States | The tow steamer, towing the barge Kingston (flag unknown), capsized and sank in heavy seas near the Southwest Ledge Light, off the mouth of the harbor at New Haven, Connecticut in six fathoms (36 ft; 11 m) of water. Two of her crew were rescued by the lighthouse keeper. Her captain and chief engineer died. The vessel was scheduled to be raised. |
| Leone Decimo Terzo | Italy | The sailing vessel was sunk in the Mediterranean Sea off Marettimo by SM UC-35 (Imperial German Navy). |
| HMT Lord Ridley | Royal Navy | World War I: The naval trawler struck a mine and sank in the North Sea off Whitby, Yorkshire (54°31′N 0°37′W) with the loss of ten of her crew. |
| Minerva | Norway | World War I: The coaster was sunk in the English Channel 15 nautical miles (28 km) west of Portland Bill by SM UC-61 (Imperial German Navy). Her crew survived. |
| Sebastian | United Kingdom | The tanker caught fire in the Atlantic Ocean. She was taken in tow by a United States Navy gunboat but subsequently sank. |
| Veni | Norway | World War I: The coaster was sunk in the English Channel 15 nautical miles (28 km) west of Portland Bill (50°32′N 2°47′W) by SM UC-17 (Imperial German Navy). Her crew survived. |

== 11 May ==
List of shipwrecks: 11 May 1917
| Ship | State | Description |
|---|---|---|
| Anna Alwina | Russia | World War I: The brigantine was sunk in the Atlantic Ocean south west of Ireland by SM U-80 (Imperial German Navy). |
| August Brohan | Imperial German Navy | World War I: The Augustenburg-class Vorpostenboot was sunk by mines northwest of Romo, Denmark. |
| Barrister | United Kingdom | Barrister World War I: The cargo ship was torpedoed and sunk in the Atlantic Ocean 7 nautical miles (13 km) south of Mine Head, County Waterford by SM U-49 (Imperial German Navy). Her crew survived. |
| HMT Bracklyn | Royal Navy | World War I: The 125.7-foot (38.3 m), 303-ton steam minesweeping naval trawler struck a mine laid by SM UC-1 (Imperial German Navy) and sank in the North Sea off Great Yarmouth, Norfolk (52°42′N 2°10′E) with the loss of ten of her crew. |
| Calchas | United Kingdom | World War I: The cargo ship was torpedoed and sunk in the Atlantic Ocean 3 nautical miles (5.6 km) west by south of Tearaght Island, County Kerry (52°00′N 10°40′W) by SM U-80 (Imperial German Navy). Her crew survived. |
| Conger Coal | Canada | The steamer burned to the waterline and sank in Little Sodus Bay near Fair Haven, New York on Lake Ontario when Lloyd S. Porter (Canada) which was tied up alongside caught fire. Her machinery was salvaged. The wreck removed in late 1956 by the United States Army Corps of Engineers as a hazard to navigation. |
| Hermes | Russia | World War I: The cargo ship was shelled and sunk in the Barents Sea off Vardø, Finnmark, Norway (71°16′N 33°45′E) by SM U-45 (Imperial German Navy) with the loss of all 34 crew. |
| Hindoo | United Kingdom | World War I: The cargo ship was torpedoed and damaged in the Mediterranean Sea between Algiers and Ténès, Algeria (36°37′N 1°55′E) by SM U-47 (Imperial German Navy) and was beached. She was later refloated. |
| Italia | Italy | The cargo ship ran aground and sank on the Wingletang Rock, Isles of Scilly, United Kingdom. |
| Lady Charlotte | United Kingdom | The collier ran aground and sank at Porth Hellick Point, Isles of Scilly. Her crew survived. |
| Lefkosia | Greece | World War I: The cargo ship was scuttled in the Mediterranean Sea off Cape Tortosa, Spain (40°49′N 1°00′E) by SM U-34 (Imperial German Navy). Her crew survived. |
| Limassol | United Kingdom | World War I: The sailing vessel was scuttled in the Tyrrhenian Sea off Montecristo, Italy, by SM UC-35 (Imperial German Navy). |
| Lloyd S. Porter | Canada | The steamer burned to the waterline and sank in Little Sodus Bay near Fair Haven, New York on Lake Ontario. Also burned was Lloyd S. Porter (Canada) that was tied up alongside, along with 125 feet (38 m) of trestle belonging to the Lehigh Valley Railroad. Her machinery was salvaged. The wreck was removed in late 1956 by the United States Army Corps of Engineers as a hazard to navigation. |
| Luisa Madre | Italy | World War I: The sailing vessel was sunk in the Tyrrhenian Sea off Cape Figari, Sardinia by SM UC-35 (Imperial German Navy). |
| Carolina | Italy | World War I: The sailing vessel was sunk in the Tyrrhenian Sea off Cape Figari by SM UC-35 (Imperial German Navy). |
| Medjerda | France | World War I: The troopship was torpedoed and sunk in the Mediterranean Sea 6 nautical miles (11 km) off Cape Tortosa (40°45′N 1°12′E) by SM U-34 (Imperial German Navy) with the loss of 344 lives. |
| Rosalia Madre | Italy | World War I: The sailing vessel was sunk in the Tyrrhenian Sea off Cape Figari by SM UC-35 (Imperial German Navy). |
| Sant’ Antonio | Italy | World War I: The sailing vessel was sunk in the Tyrrhenian Sea off Cape Figari by SM UC-35 (Imperial German Navy). |
| Tarpeia | United Kingdom | World War I: The coaster was scuttled in the English Channel 9 nautical miles (17 km) north of Port-en-Bessin, Manche, France (49°30′N 0°49′W) by SM UB-18 (Imperial German Navy). Her crew survived. |

== 12 May ==
List of shipwrecks: 12 May 1917
| Ship | State | Description |
|---|---|---|
| Egyptian Prince | United Kingdom | World War I: The cargo ship was scuttled in the Mediterranean Sea 240 nautical miles (440 km) south south east of Malta (34°20′N 18°52′E) by SM U-38 (Imperial German Navy). Her crew survived. |
| Galicia | United Kingdom | World War I: The cargo ship struck a mine and sank in the English Channel 3 nautical miles (5.6 km) east of Teignmouth, Devon (50°32′N 3°24′W). Her crew survived. |
| G.L.C. | United Kingdom | World War I: The fishing smack was scuttled in the Atlantic Ocean south east of the Eddystone Lighthouse by SM UC-17 (Imperial German Navy). Her crew survived. |
| Locksley Hall | United Kingdom | World War I: The cargo ship was torpedoed and sunk in the Mediterranean Sea 30 nautical miles (56 km) south east by south of Malta 35°23′N 14°56′E) by SM U-32 (Imperial German Navy) with the loss of six crew. |
| Refugio | United Kingdom | World War I: The cargo ship was shelled and sunk in the Atlantic Ocean 115 nautical miles (213 km) north west of Tory Island, County Donegal (55°10′N 11°35′W) by SM U-57 (Imperial German Navy) with the loss of a crew member. |
| San Onofre | United Kingdom | World War I: The tanker was torpedoed and sunk in the Atlantic Ocean 64 nautical miles (119 km) north west of the Skelligs (52°25′N 11°42′W) by SM U-48 (Imperial German Navy) with the loss of a crew member. |
| Waterville | United Kingdom | World War I: The cargo ship struck a mine and was damaged in the North Sea. She was beached but was later refloated. Her crew survived. |
| Wirral | United Kingdom | World War I: The cargo ship was torpedoed and sunk in the Norwegian Sea 23 nautical miles (43 km) north west of Utvær, Sogn og Fjordane, Norway by SM U-19 (Imperial German Navy) with the loss of a crew member. |
| Zanoni | United Kingdom | World War I: The cargo ship was torpedoed and sunk in the Mediterranean Sea 12 nautical miles (22 km) north east by east of Cape Oropesa, Spain (40°10′N 0°25′E) by SM U-34 (Imperial German Navy) with the loss of a crew member. |

== 13 May ==
List of shipwrecks: 13 May 1917
| Ship | State | Description |
|---|---|---|
| A. G. Pease | United States | The Schooner sank in the Connecticut River at Saybrook Point, Connecticut. |
| Anna | Denmark | World War I: The three-masted barque was sunk in the English Channel 30 nautical miles (56 km) north east of the Île de Batz, Finistère, France (49°12′N 4°26′W) by SM UC-17 (Imperial German Navy). Her crew survived. |
| Hudson | Norway | World War I: The barque was sunk in the Atlantic Ocean 30 nautical miles (56 km) north north west of Ouessant, Finistère (48°48′N 7°56′W) by SM UC-17 (Imperial German Navy). Her crew survived. |
| Jessmore | United Kingdom | World War I: The cargo ship was torpedoed and sunk in the Atlantic Ocean 180 nautical miles (330 km) west north west of the Fastnet Rock by SM U-48 (Imperial German Navy). Her crew survived. |
| L'Independiente F | Italy | World War I: The sailing vessel was scuttled in the Mediterranean Sea south of the Cabo de Gata, Spain (36°31′N 2°02′W) by SM U-47 (Imperial German Navy). |
| Rio Amazonas | Italy | World War I: The cargo ship was sunk in the Mediterranean Sea 150 nautical miles (280 km) south west of Crete, Greece (33°40′N 20°46′E) by SM U-38 (Imperial German Navy). Her crew survived. |

== 14 May ==
List of shipwrecks: 14 May 1917
| Ship | State | Description |
|---|---|---|
| Bel Lily | United Kingdom | World War I: The trawler struck a mine and sank in the North Sea 1.5 nautical miles (2.8 km) east north east of Peterhead, Aberdeenshire with the loss of ten of her crew. |
| Cairnmoney | United Kingdom | World War I: The barque was scuttled in the Atlantic Ocean 150 nautical miles (280 km) west of the Fastnet Rock by SM U-49 (Imperial German Navy). Her crew survived. |
| Elizabeth Hampton | United Kingdom | World War I: The schooner was scuttled in the English Channel 25 nautical miles (46 km) south by west of St. Catherine's Point, Isle of Wight by SM UB-18 (Imperial German Navy). Her crew survived. |
| Farley | United Kingdom | World War I: The cargo ship was torpedoed and sunk in the Atlantic Ocean 70 nautical miles (130 km) south west of the Bishop Rock, Isles of Scilly (48°56′N 7°22′W) by SM UC-17 (Imperial German Navy). Her crew survived. |
| Francesco Raiola | Italy | World War I: The brigantine was scuttled in the Mediterranean Sea east of Sicily (37°41′N 15°29′E) by SM U-63 (Imperial German Navy). |
| SMS Fulda | Imperial German Navy | The Vorpostenboot was lost on this date. |
| Gravelinoise | France | World War I: The sailing vessel was scuttled in the Mediterranean Sea 12 nautical miles (22 km) east of Valencia, Spain (39°27′N 0°05′W) by SM U-34 (Imperial German Navy). Her crew survived. |
| Pentecost Mitchell | United States | The steamer was sunk in a collision with Saxona (United States) off Frying Pan Shoal in the Soo River. Raised, taken to Toledo, Ohio for repairs and returned to service. |
| Saint Francis | United States | During a voyage from San Francisco, California, to the Libby McNeil & Libby Ekuk Cannery at Kvichak on the Bristol Bay coast of the Territory of Alaska with a crew of 17 and a 1,500-ton cargo of general merchandise and cannery supplies aboard, the 1,898-gross register ton, 231.4-foot (70.5 m) wooden ship was wrecked 1 nautical mile (1.9 km; 1.2 mi) south of Middle Point (54°29′00″N 164°54′30″W) on Unimak Island in the Aleutian Islands and became a total loss. The steamers Goliah and Norwood (flags unknown) rescued her entire crew. |
| Saint Katherine | United States | The 1,201-gross register ton, 202-foot (62 m) bark ran aground at Ugashik, Territory of Alaska, and broke her keel. She was refloated late in the summer of 1917 and repaired. |
| Standard | United States | During a voyage from San Francisco, California, to the Libby McNeil & Libby Ekuk Cannery at Kvichak on the Bristol Bay coast of the Territory of Alaska with 162 passengers, a crew of 15 men, and a cargo of 2,707,349 pounds (1,228,033 kg) of cannery supplies aboard, the 1,534-gross register ton, 212-foot (65 m) wooden ship was wrecked without loss of life during a storm in Bristol Bay at Cape Constantine. All on board were rescued by the steamers George F. Haller and North Star (both United States). |
| Saxona | United States | The steamer was sunk in a collision with Pentecost Mitchell (United States) off Frying Pan Shoal off the south end of Pipe Island in the Soo River. Raised and moved into shoal water by October, later taken to Collingwood, Ontario for repairs and returned to service. |
| Tamon Maru No.11 | Japan | The cargo ship sank at Aburatsu, Hyūga, Miyazaki. |
| Tejo | Portugal | World War I: The sailing vessel was scuttled in the Mediterranean Sea (38°58′N 0°18′E) by SM U-34 (Imperial German Navy). Her crew survived. |
| SM U-59 | Imperial German Navy | World War I: The Type U 57 submarine struck a mine and sank in the North Sea (55°33′N 7°15′E) with the loss of 33 of her 37 crew. |
| Volga | United Kingdom | World War I: The cargo ship was torpedoed and damaged in the Mediterranean Sea east of Sicily by SM U-63 (Imperial German Navy). She was beached but was later refloated. |

== 15 May ==
List of shipwrecks: 15 May 1917
| Ship | State | Description |
|---|---|---|
| HMT Admirable | Royal Navy | World War I: Battle of the Strait of Otranto: The naval trawler was sunk in the Adriatic Sea by an Austro-Hungarian Navy warship. |
| HMT Avondale | Royal Navy | World War I: Battle of the Strait of Otranto: The naval trawler was sunk in the Adriatic Sea by an Austro-Hungarian Navy warship. |
| Borea | Regia Marina | World War I: Battle of the Strait of Otranto: The Nembo-class destroyer was sunk by gunfire in the Adriatic Sea off the coast of Albania by the destroyer Csepel (Austro-Hungarian Navy). |
| Boreas | Netherlands | World War I: The auxiliary sailing vessel was sunk in the North Sea 25 nautical miles (46 km) north west of IJmuiden, North Holland by SM UC-71 (Imperial German Navy). |
| Boutefeu | French Navy | World War I: Battle of the Strait of Otranto: The Bouclier-class destroyer struck a mine and sank in the Strait of Otranto off Brindisi, Apulia, Italy. |
| Carroccio | Kingdom of Italy | World War I: Battle of the Strait of Otranto: The cargo ship was sunk by gunfire in the Adriatic Sea off the coast of Albania by the destroyer Balaton (Austro-Hungarian Navy). |
| HMT Coral Haven | Royal Navy | World War I: Battle of the Strait of Otranto: The naval trawler was sunk in the Adriatic Sea by an Austro-Hungarian Navy warship. |
| HMT Craignoon | Royal Navy | World War I: Battle of the Strait of Otranto: The naval trawler was sunk in the Adriatic Sea by an Austro-Hungarian Navy warship. |
| Cuba | United Kingdom | World War I: The barquentine was scuttled in the English Channel 10 nautical miles (19 km) west of the Owers Lightship (United Kingdom) by SM UB-40 (Imperial German Navy). Her crew survived. |
| HMT Felicitas | Royal Navy | World War I: Battle of the Strait of Otranto: The naval trawler was sunk in the Adriatic Sea by an Austro-Hungarian Navy warship. |
| Ferrara | Italy | World War I: The cargo ship was torpedoed and damaged in the Strait of Messina by SM U-63 (Imperial German Navy). She was beached but was later refloated. |
| HMT Girl Gracie | Royal Navy | World War I: Battle of the Strait of Otranto: The naval trawler was sunk in the Adriatic Sea by an Austro-Hungarian Navy warship. |
| HMT Girl Rose | Royal Navy | World War I: Battle of the Strait of Otranto: The naval trawler was sunk in the Adriatic Sea by an Austro-Hungarian Navy warship. |
| Grosholm | Norway | World War I: The cargo ship was sunk in the Atlantic Ocean 200 nautical miles (370 km) west of Ireland (55°53′N 12°15′W) by SM U-46 (Imperial German Navy). Her crew survived. |
| SMS Heinrich Rathjen | Imperial German Navy | The Vorpostenboot was lost on this date. |
| HMT Helenora | Royal Navy | World War I: Battle of the Strait of Otranto: The naval trawler was sunk in the Adriatic Sea by an Austro-Hungarian Navy warship. |
| Meuse | France | World War I: The cargo ship was sunk in the Atlantic Ocean west of the Fastnet Rock (50°49′N 15°27′W) by SM U-48 (Imperial German Navy). |
| Omilak Chief | United States | The 65-gross register ton, 70-foot (21.3 m) sternwheel paddle steamer was crushed by ice on the Fish River in the Territory of Alaska. |
| Pancras | United Kingdom | World War I: The cargo ship was shelled and damaged in the Mediterranean Sea off Punta Sabinal, Spain by SM U-47 (Imperial German Navy) and was beached. She was later refloated. |
| Panaghi Lykiardopoulo | Greece | World War I: The cargo ship was sunk in the English Channel west of the Roches-Douvres Lighthouse (49°00′N 3°32′W) by SM UB-18 (Imperial German Navy). Her crew survived. |
| Polymnia | United Kingdom | World War I: The cargo ship was torpedoed and sunk in the Atlantic Ocean 15 nautical miles (28 km) west of The Lizard, Cornwall by SM UC-75 (Imperial German Navy) with the loss of eight of her crew. |
| HMT Quarry Knowe | Royal Navy | World War I: Battle of the Strait of Otranto: The naval trawler was sunk in the Adriatic Sea by an Austro-Hungarian Navy warship. |
| Rosina | United Kingdom | The brigantine ran aground at Ribeirinha Point, Faial, Azores, Portugal and was a total loss. Her crew were rescued. |
| Scorpione | Regia Marina | The Sirio-class torpedo boat collided with Surveillante (French Navy) and sank in the Mediterranean Sea off Pantelleria Island, Italy. |
| HMT Selby | Royal Navy | World War I: Battle of the Strait of Otranto: The naval trawler was sunk in the Adriatic Sea by an Austro-Hungarian Navy warship. |
| HMT Serene | Royal Navy | World War I: Battle of the Strait of Otranto: The naval trawler was sunk in the Adriatic Sea by an Austro-Hungarian Navy warship. |
| St. Frances | United States | The cargo ship ran aground at Unimak Pass, Alaska and was a total loss. |
| HMT Taits | Royal Navy | World War I: Battle of the Strait of Otranto: The naval trawler was sunk in the Adriatic Sea by an Austro-Hungarian Navy warship. |
| HMT Transit | Royal Navy | World War I: Battle of the Strait of Otranto: The naval trawler was sunk in the Adriatic Sea by an Austro-Hungarian Navy warship. |
| Tung Shan | United Kingdom | World War I: The cargo ship was scuttled in the Mediterranean Sea 7 nautical miles (13 km) north of Cape San Antonio, Spain (39°02′N 0°19′E) by SM U-34 (Imperial German Navy) with the loss of a crew member. Three crew were taken as prisoners of war. |
| HMT Young Linnet | Royal Navy | World War I: Battle of the Strait of Otranto: The naval trawler was sunk in the Adriatic Sea by an Austro-Hungarian Navy warship. |

== 16 May ==
List of shipwrecks: 16 May 1917
| Ship | State | Description |
|---|---|---|
| HMS Dartmouth | Royal Navy | World War I: Battle of the Strait of Otranto: The Town-class cruiser was torpedoed and totally disabled in the Strait of Otranto off Brindisi, Apulia, Italy by SM UC-25 (Imperial German Navy) with the loss of five of her 433 crew. She was later repaired and returned to service. |
| Dorothy Duff | United Kingdom | World War I: The schooner was scuttled in the Mediterranean Sea 14 nautical miles (26 km) off Cape Cullera, Spain (39°16′N 0°08′E) by SM U-34 (Imperial German Navy). Her crew survived. |
| Friso | Netherlands | World War I: The schooner was sunk in the English Channel south east of Start Point, Devon, United Kingdom by SM UB-20 (Imperial German Navy). |
| Hendrika Johana | Netherlands | World War I: The sailing vessel was shelled and sunk in the North Sea north of the Maas Lightship (Netherlands) (52°31′N 4°20′E) by SM UC-71 (Imperial German Navy). |
| Highland Corrie | United Kingdom | World War I: The cargo ship was torpedoed and sunk in the English Channel 4 nautical miles (7.4 km) south of the Owers Lightship (United Kingdom) (50°28′N 0°38′W) by SM UB-40 (Imperial German Navy) with the loss of five of her crew. |
| Hilonian | United States | World War I: The cargo ship was torpedoed and sunk in the Gulf of Genoa 3 nautical miles (5.6 km) off the Albenga by SM UC-35 (Imperial German Navy) with the loss of four of her crew. |
| SMS M14 | Imperial German Navy | World War I: The M1-class minesweeper was sunk by mines in the North Sea. |
| Middlesex | United Kingdom | World War I: The cargo ship was torpedoed and sunk in the Atlantic Ocean 150 nautical miles (280 km) north west of Tory Island, County Donegal (56°03′N 12°30′W) by SM U-30 (Imperial German Navy). Her crew survived. |
| Pagenturm | United Kingdom | World War I: The cargo ship was torpedoed and sunk in the English Channel 16 nautical miles (30 km) west of Beachy Head, Sussex (50°40′N 0°10′W) by SM UB-40 (Imperial German Navy) with the loss of four of her crew. |
| SMS S17 | Imperial German Navy | World War I: The V1-class destroyer struck a mine and sank in the North Sea with the loss of 25 of her crew. |

== 17 May ==
List of shipwrecks: 17 May 1917
| Ship | State | Description |
|---|---|---|
| Alfonso | Italy | World War I: The sailing vessel was scuttled in the Mediterranean Sea 10 nautical miles (19 km) off Denia, Spain (39°00′N 0°10′E) by SM U-34 (Imperial German Navy). |
| Cito | United Kingdom | World War I: The coaster was shelled and sunk in the North Sea 20 nautical miles (37 km) east of the Noord Hinder Lightship (Netherlands) by a Kaiserliche Marine torpedo boat with the loss of eleven of her crew. |
| Eirini | Greece | World War I: The cargo ship was sunk in the Atlantic Ocean 50 nautical miles (93 km) south south west of Cádiz, Spain (35°55′N 6°31′W) by SM U-47 (Imperial German Navy). Her crew survived. |
| Florence Louisa | United Kingdom | World War I: The schooner was scuttled in the English Channel 8 nautical miles (15 km) off The Needles, Isle of Wight by SM UB-40 (Imperial German Navy). Her crew survived. |
| George Pyman | United Kingdom | World War I: The cargo ship was torpedoed and sunk in the Atlantic Ocean 130 nautical miles (240 km) west of Tearaght Island, County Kerry by SM U-49 (Imperial German Navy). Her crew survived. |
| Jakoba | Netherlands | World War I: The fishing vessel was scuttled in the North Sea off Den Helder, North Holland by SM UC-71 (Imperial German Navy). Her crew survived. |
| Kilmaho | United Kingdom | World War I: The cargo ship was torpedoed and sunk in the English Channel 10 nautical miles (19 km) west north west of The Lizard, Cornwall (49°58′N 5°19′W) by SM UB-20 (Imperial German Navy) with the loss of 21 of her crew. |
| Lewisham | United Kingdom | World War I: The cargo ship was sunk in the Atlantic Ocean west of Ireland by SM U-46 (Imperial German Navy) with the loss of 24 crew. Three survivors were taken as prisoners of war. |
| Margareta | Russia | World War I: The four-masted barque was shelled and sunk in the Atlantic Ocean (51°00′N 12°18′W). |
| Mercurius | Netherlands | World War I: The fishing vessel was scuttled in the North Sea 17 nautical miles (31 km) north west of Noordwijk, North Holland by SM UC-71 (Imperial German Navy). Her crew survived. |
| HMS Setter | Royal Navy | The R-class destroyer collided with HMS Sylph (Royal Navy) and sank in the North Sea off Harwich, Essex. |
| Vesterland | Sweden | World War I: The cargo ship was sunk in the North Sea 30 nautical miles (56 km) east of Lerwick, Shetland Isles, United Kingdom by SM U-19 (Imperial German Navy). Three casualties. |
| Viken | Sweden | World War I: The cargo ship was sunk with the loss of eight crew in the North Sea 20 nautical miles (37 km) east of the Orkney Islands, United Kingdom by SM UC-31 (Imperial German Navy). |

== 18 May ==
List of shipwrecks: 18 May 1917
| Ship | State | Description |
|---|---|---|
| Adventure | United Kingdom | World War I: The drifter was shelled and sunk in the Atlantic Ocean south west of the Bishop Rock, Isles of Scilly by SM UB-20 (Imperial German Navy). Her crew survived. |
| Annetta | Netherlands | World War I: The coaster was scuttled in the North Sea 40 nautical miles (74 km) off IJmuiden, North Holland by SM UC-71 (Imperial German Navy). |
| Camberwell | United Kingdom | World War I: The cargo ship struck a mine and sank in the English Channel 6 nautical miles (11 km) south east by south of Dunnose Head, Isle of Wight (50°35′N 1°03′W) with the loss of seven of her crew. |
| C.E.C.G. | United Kingdom | World War I: The ketch was scuttled in the English Channel 30 nautical miles (56 km) south south east of Start Point, Devon (50°48′N 4°48′W) by SM UC-70 (Imperial German Navy). Her crew survived. |
| Dromore | United Kingdom | World War I: The coaster was shelled and sunk in the English Channel 6 nautical miles (11 km) south of St. Martin's Point, Guernsey, Channel Islands by SM UC-70 (Imperial German Navy). Her crew survived. |
| Elford | United Kingdom | World War I: The cargo ship struck a mine and sank in the English Channel 2 nautical miles (3.7 km) south of the Nab Lightship (United Kingdom) (50°38′N 0°58′W). Her crew survived. |
| Frances M. | United States | World War I: The sailing vessel was scuttled in the Atlantic Ocean west of Gibraltar (35°29′N 8°18′W) by SM U-47 (Imperial German Navy). Her crew survived, but a crew member of U-47 was lost during the scuttling operation. |
| Llandrindod | United Kingdom | World War I: The cargo ship was torpedoed and sunk in the Atlantic Ocean 165 nautical miles (306 km) north west by west of the Fastnet Rock (51°45′N 13°58′W) by SM U-46 (Imperial German Navy). Her crew survived, but her captain was taken as a prisoner of war. |
| HMT Lucknow | Royal Navy | World War I: The naval trawler struck a mine and sank in the English Channel 2 nautical miles (3.7 km) west of the Owers Lightship (United Kingdom) with the loss of nine of her crew. |
| Mary Baird | United Kingdom | World War I: The cargo ship struck a mine and sank in the Atlantic Ocean 2.5 nautical miles (4.6 km) west of Pendeen Cove, Cornwall (50°10′N 5°44′W)with the loss of seven of her crew. |
| Millicent Knight | United Kingdom | World War I: The collier was torpedoed and sunk in the Mediterranean Sea 130 nautical miles (240 km) east by south of Malta (35°37′N 17°13′E) by SM UC-20 (Imperial German Navy) with the loss of a crew member. |
| Penhale | United Kingdom | World War I: The cargo ship was torpedoed and sunk in the Atlantic Ocean 72 nautical miles (133 km) north west by north of Tearaght Island, County Kerry by SM U-46 (Imperial German Navy) with the loss of a crew member. Her captain was taken as a prisoner of war. |
| Primrose | United Kingdom | World War I: The drifter was shelled and sunk in the Atlantic Ocean 22 nautical miles (41 km) west by south of the Bishop Rock by SM UB-20 (Imperial German Navy). Her crew survived. |

== 19 May ==
List of shipwrecks: 19 May 1917
| Ship | State | Description |
|---|---|---|
| Askild | Norway | World War I: The cargo ship was sunk in the Atlantic Ocean 19 nautical miles (35 km) north of Ouessant, Finistère, France by SM UB-20 (Imperial German Navy). Her crew survived. |
| Elise | Denmark | World War I: The schooner was sunk in the North Sea (57°28′N 3°10′E) by SM U-45 (Imperial German Navy) with the loss of six crew. |
| Erik | Sweden | World War I: The coaster was sunk in the Baltic Sea off the coast of Finland (60°15′N 19°44′E) by SM UC-58 (Imperial German Navy). Her crew survived. |
| Farnham | United Kingdom | World War I: The cargo ship was torpedoed and sunk in the Atlantic Ocean 90 nautical miles (170 km) north west of the Fastnet Rock by SM U-57 (Imperial German Navy) with the loss of seventeen crew. |
| Kjell | Sweden | World War I: The coaster was sunk in the Baltic Sea off the coast of Finland by SM UC-58 (Imperial German Navy). Her crew survived. |
| HMT Kumu | Royal Navy | World War I:The 130-foot (40 m) minesweeping naval trawler was damaged by a mine at (50°30′N 3°22′W) and beached at Babbacombe. Refloated, repaired and returned to service. |
| Kyros | Sweden | World War I: The coaster was sunk in the Baltic Sea off the coast of Finland by SM UC-58 (Imperial German Navy). Her crew survived. |
| Mardinian | United Kingdom | World War I: The cargo ship was torpedoed and sunk in the Mediterranean Sea 4 nautical miles (7.4 km) south by west of Tabarka Island, Spain (38°05′N 0°31′W) by SM U-34 (Imperial German Navy). Her crew survived. |
| Mordenwood | United Kingdom | World War I: The cargo ship was sunk in the Mediterranean Sea 90 nautical miles (170 km) south east by south of Cape Matapan, Greece (35°02′N 22°05′E) by SM U-28 (Austro-Hungarian Navy) with the loss of 21 of her crew. |
| Olga | Sweden | World War I: The sailing vessel was sunk in the Baltic Sea off the coast of Finland by SM UC-58 (Imperial German Navy). |
| Pauline | Sweden | World War I: The coaster was scuttled in the Baltic Sea off Rauma, Finland by SM UC-58 (Imperial German Navy). Her crew survived. |
| Therese | Sweden | World War I: The coaster was scuttled in the Baltic Sea off the coast of Finland by SM UC-58 (Imperial German Navy). Her crew survived. |
| Vasca | United States | The schooner barge capsized one mile (1.6 km) off Tampico, Mexico. The vessel drifted ashore six miles (9.7 km) north of Tampico the next day, a total loss. |

== 20 May ==
List of shipwrecks: 20 May 1917
| Ship | State | Description |
|---|---|---|
| Arnfinn Jarl | Norway | World War I: The cargo ship was torpedoed and sunk in the North Sea 16 nautical miles (30 km) west of Holmengråa, Vestland by SM U-19 (Imperial German Navy). Her crew survived. |
| Caspian | United Kingdom | World War I: The cargo ship was torpedoed and sunk in the Mediterranean Sea 3 nautical miles (5.6 km) off Cape Cervera, Spain (37°53′N 0°22′W) by SM U-34 (Imperial German Navy) with the loss of 25 crew. Three survivors were taken as prisoners of war. |
| Dana | United Kingdom | World War I: The brigantine was scuttled in the English Channel 20 nautical miles (37 km) north west of Guernsey, Channel Islands by SM UC-36 (Imperial German Navy). Her crew survived. |
| HMS Paxton | Royal Navy | World War I: The Q-ship was sunk in the Atlantic Ocean 90 nautical miles (170 km) west of the Skelligs (51°42′N 13°13′W) by SM U-46 (Imperial German Navy) with the loss of 31 crew. Two survivors were taken as prisoners of war. |
| Mientji | United Kingdom | World War I: The sailing vessel was scuttled in the English Channel 25 nautical miles (46 km) off the Les Hanois Lighthouse, Guernsey by SM UC-36 (Imperial German Navy). Her crew survived. |
| Normand | Norway | World War I: The cargo ship was sunk in the Atlantic Ocean 25 nautical miles (46 km) north of Ouessant, Finistère, France by SM UB-20 (Imperial German Navy). Her crew survived. |
| Porthkerry | United Kingdom | World War I: The collier was torpedoed and sunk in the English Channel 16 nautical miles (30 km) west by south of Beachy Head, Sussex (50°38′N 0°08′W) by SM UB-40 (Imperial German Navy) with the loss of seven of her crew. |
| Tijuca | Brazil | World War I: The cargo ship was sunk in the Atlantic Ocean 5 nautical miles (9.3 km) south west of the Pierres Noires Lighthouse, Finistère, France by SM UC-36 (Imperial German Navy). Her crew survived. Some salvaging was done. |
| Tycho | United Kingdom | World War I: The cargo ship was torpedoed and sunk in the English Channel 16 nautical miles (30 km) west of Beachy Head by SM UB-40 (Imperial German Navy) with the loss of fifteen of her crew. |
| Voorwaarts | Netherlands | World War I: The sailing vessel was damaged in the North Sea off Terschelling, Friesland by SM UC-64 (Imperial German Navy). She was towed in to Great Yarmouth, Norfolk, United Kingdom but was declared a total loss. |

== 21 May ==
List of shipwrecks: 21 May 1917
| Ship | State | Description |
|---|---|---|
| HMS Ampleforth | Royal Navy | World War I: The collier was torpedoed and sunk in the Mediterranean Sea 15 nautical miles (28 km) west south west of Gozo, Malta (36°10′N 13°30′E) by SM U-65 (Imperial German Navy) with the loss of four of her crew. |
| City of Corinth | United Kingdom | World War I: The cargo ship was torpedoed and sunk in the English Channel 12 nautical miles (22 km) south west of The Lizard, Cornwall (49°54′N 5°30′W) by SM UB-31 (Imperial German Navy). Her crew survived. |
| Don Diego | United Kingdom | World War I: The cargo ship was shelled and sunk in the Mediterranean Sea 40 nautical miles (74 km) east by south of Linosa, Italy (35°50′N 13°40′E) by SM U-65 (Imperial German Navy) with the loss of five of her crew. |
| Ferdinand A. | France | World War I: The cargo ship was torpedoed and sunk in the English Channel 10 to 15 nautical miles (19 to 28 km) off the Stiff Lighthouse, Ouessant, Finistère (48°40′N 5°10′W) by SM UC-36 (Imperial German Navy). Her crew survived. |
| Jupiter | United Kingdom | World War I: The cargo ship was torpedoed and sunk in the English Channel 15 nautical miles (28 km) west of Beachy Head, Sussex (50°38′N 0°05′W) by SM UB-40 (Imperial German Navy) with the loss of nineteen of her crew. |
| Lanthorn | United Kingdom | World War I: The cargo ship was captured and scuttled in the North Sea off Whitby, Yorkshire by SM UB-41 (Imperial German Navy). Her crew survived. |
| Lynton | Russia | World War I: The four-masted barque was sunk in the Atlantic Ocean 50 nautical miles (93 km) off Queenstown, County Cork, United Kingdom by SM U-48 (Imperial German Navy). |
| Madura | Norway | World War I: The barque was scuttled in the Atlantic Ocean 50 nautical miles (93 km) south west of Queenstown by SM U-48 (Imperial German Navy) with the loss of two crew. |
| Saint Michel | France | World War I: The brigantine was scuttled in the Mediterranean Sea south of the Balearic Islands (37°55′N 1°15′E) by SM U-34 (Imperial German Navy). |
| HMT Senator | Royal Navy | World War I: The naval trawler struck a mine and sank in the Atlantic Ocean off Tory Island, County Donegal (55°15′N 8°10′W) with the loss of eleven crew. |
| SM UC-36 | Imperial German Navy | World War I: The Type UC II submarine was rammed and sunk in the Bay of Biscay off Ouessant (48°42′N 5°14′W) by Molière (France) with the loss of all 26 crew. |

== 22 May ==
List of shipwrecks: 22 May 1917
| Ship | State | Description |
|---|---|---|
| HMT Epworth | Royal Navy | The 112.2-foot (34.2 m), 223-ton steam minesweeping naval trawler was sunk in a collision in the North Sea with the loss of her captain and 10 crew. |
| Jeune Albert | France | World War I: The fishing vessel was sunk in the Bay of Biscay by SM UC-21 (Imperial German Navy). |
| Lanthorn | United Kingdom | World War I: The cargo ship was sunk in the North Sea 3 nautical miles (5.6 km) east of Whitby, Yorkshire (54°30′N 0°29′W) by SM UB-41 (Imperial German Navy). Her crew survived. |
| Lapa | Brazil | World War I: The cargo ship was scuttled in the Atlantic Ocean 130 nautical miles (240 km) west south west of Gibraltar (35°28′N 8°03′W) by SM U-47 (Imperial German Navy). |
| Max Schinkel | Imperial German Navy | World War I: The Neuwerk-class Vorpostenboot was sunk by mines northeast of Ameland. |
| HMT Merse | Royal Navy | World War I: The 135.8-foot (41.4 m), 296-ton minesweeping naval trawler struck a mine and sank in the Firth of Clyde 6 nautical miles (11 km) south east of Garroch Head, Isle of Bute with the loss of all seventeen crew. |
| Milo | United Kingdom | The collier collided with another vessel and sank in the English Channel off St. Alban's Head, Dorset. |
| Nann Smith | Norway | World War I: The cargo ship struck a mine and sank in the Bay of Biscay between Belle Île and Groix, Morbihan, France (47°13′N 3°14′W). Her crew survived. |
| Tansan Maru | Japan | World War I: The cargo ship was sunk in the Atlantic Ocean 80 nautical miles (150 km) west of Annagh Head, County Mayo, United Kingdom (54°10′N 12°40′W) by SM U-46 (Imperial German Navy). Her crew survived. |

== 23 May ==
List of shipwrecks: 23 May 1917
| Ship | State | Description |
|---|---|---|
| Alberdina | Netherlands | World War I: The sailing vessel was scuttled in the North Sea 25 nautical miles (46 km) north west of the Maas Lightship (Netherlands) by SM UC-64 (Imperial German Navy). Her crew survived. |
| Begona No.3 | Spain | World War I: The cargo ship was sunk in the Atlantic Ocean 29 nautical miles (54 km) north of Ouessant, Finistère, France (48°55′N 5°04′W) by SM UC-70 (Imperial German Navy). Her crew survived. |
| Beinir | Denmark | World War I: The fishing vessel was sunk in the Atlantic Ocean off the Faroe Islands by SM UC-33 (Imperial German Navy). Her crew survived. |
| Britannia | Denmark | World War I: The fishing vessel was sunk in the Atlantic Ocean off the Faroe Islands by SM UC-33 (Imperial German Navy). Her crew survived. |
| Else | Denmark | World War I: The fishing vessel was sunk in the Atlantic Ocean off the Faroe Islands by SM UC-33 (Imperial German Navy). Her crew survived. |
| Elmmoor | United Kingdom | World War I: The cargo ship was torpedoed and sunk in the Mediterranean Sea 36 nautical miles (67 km) east by south of Syracuse, Sicily, Italy (36°54′N 16°09′E) by SM UC-67 (Imperial German Navy). Her crew survived but her captain was taken as a prisoner of war. |
| Elve | Netherlands | World War I: The coaster was sunk in the Atlantic Ocean off the north coast of Scotland (59°39′N 3°20′W) by SM U-87 (Imperial German Navy). |
| England | United Kingdom | World War I: The collier was scuttled in the Mediterranean Sea 40 nautical miles (74 km) south by east of Cap Bon, Tunisia (36°20′N 11°15′E) by SM U-65 Imperial German Navy with the loss of three crew. |
| Freden | Denmark | World War I: The three-masted schooner was sunk in the Atlantic Ocean 60 nautical miles (110 km) north west of the Butt of Lewis, United Kingdom by SM U-30 (Imperial German Navy) with the loss of two crew. |
| Gran | Norway | World War I: The cargo ship struck a mine and sank in the North Sea off Ryhope, County Durham, United Kingdom (54°54′N 1°20′W). Her crew survived. |
| Harwood Palmer | United States | World War I: The schooner was shelled and sunk in the Loire Estuary 6 nautical miles (11 km) south west of the Île de la Banche (47°16′N 2°30′W) by SM UC-21 (Imperial German Navy). Her crew were rescued by Cobra (French Navy). |
| Hector | Norway | World War I: The cargo ship was sunk in the North Sea 110 nautical miles (200 km) north north east of Flamborough Head, Yorkshire, United Kingdom (56°05′N 2°00′E) by SM U-88 (Imperial German Navy). Her crew survived. |
| Lesto | United Kingdom | World War I: The cargo ship was torpedoed and sunk in the Bay of Biscay 8 nautical miles (15 km) west of the Île du Pilier, Vendée, France (46°57′N 2°30′W) by SM UC-21 (Imperial German Navy) with the loss of four of her crew. |
| Margrethe | Denmark | World War I: The fishing vessel was sunk in the Atlantic Ocean off the Faroe Islands by SM UC-33 (Imperial German Navy). Her crew survived. |
| Febronia Maria Antonina | Italy | World War I: The sailing vessel was sunk in the Strait of Sicily by SM U-65 (Imperial German Navy). |
| Monarch | Norway | World War I: The cargo ship was sunk in the North Sea 2 nautical miles (3.7 km) east of Seaham, County Durham, United Kingdom by SM UB-41 (Imperial German Navy) with the loss of ten of her crew. |
| Olearia | United Kingdom | World War I: The fishing vessel was scuttled in the Atlantic Ocean 65 nautical miles (120 km) west south west of Suðuroy, Faroe Islands by SM UC-33 (Imperial German Navy). Her crew survived. |
| SMS Othmarschen | Imperial German Navy | The Vorpostenboot was lost on this date. |
| Pipitsa | Greece | World War I: The sailing vessel was scuttled in the Tyrrhenian Sea east of Corsica, France (42°00′N 9°59′E) by SM UC-35 (Imperial German Navy). |
| Sisapon | United Kingdom | World War I: The trawler was sunk in the Atlantic Ocean 60 nautical miles (110 km) west south west of Suðuroy by SM UC-33 (Imperial German Navy). Her crew survived. |
| Streymoy | Denmark | World War I: The trawler was sunk in the Atlantic Ocean off the Faroe Islands by SM UC-33 (Imperial German Navy). Her crew survived. |
| HMT Tettenhall | Royal Navy | World War I: The 125.7-foot (38.3 m), 227-ton minesweeping naval trawler struck a mine and sank in the North Sea 2.4 miles east south east of Lowestoft, Suffolk (52°30′N 1°54′E) with the loss of six of her crew. |

== 24 May ==
List of shipwrecks: 24 May 1917
| Ship | State | Description |
|---|---|---|
| Barbara | United States | World War I: The sailing ship was captured and scuttled by burning in the Atlantic Ocean 90 nautical miles (170 km) west of Gibraltar (36°11′N 7°58′W) by SM U-47 (Imperial German Navy). Her captain, his wife, and the crew were rescued from her boats 24 hours later by a Spanish brig. |
| Belgian | United Kingdom | World War I: The cargo ship was torpedoed and sunk in the Atlantic Ocean 50 nautical miles (93 km) west of the Fastnet Rock (50°59′N 10°42′W) by SM U-57 (Imperial German Navy) with the loss of two crew. |
| Biarritz | France | World War I: The cargo ship was torpedoed and sunk in the Mediterranean Sea 50 nautical miles (93 km) south east of Malta (35°12′N 14°16′E) by SM U-32 (Imperial German Navy). |
| Brestir | Denmark | World War I: The trawler was sunk in the Atlantic Ocean off the Faroe Islands by SM UC-33 (Imperial German Navy). Her crew survived. |
| Domenico Barone | Kingdom of Italy | World War I: The barquentine was shelled and damaged in the Mediterranean Sea off Cape Passero, Sicily (36°53′N 15°12′E) by SM UC-25 (Imperial German Navy). She was beached but was declared a total loss. |
| Gudrun | Norway | World War I: The barque was scuttled in the English Channel 50 nautical miles (93 km) south west of Portland Bill, Dorset, United Kingdom by SM UB-38 (Imperial German Navy). Her crew survived. |
| Isabella Innes | Denmark | World War I: The fishing vessel was sunk in the Atlantic Ocean off the Faroe Islands by SM UC-33 (Imperial German Navy). Her crew survived. |
| Jersey City | United Kingdom | World War I: The cargo ship was torpedoed and sunk in the Atlantic Ocean 35 nautical miles (65 km) north west of Flannan Island, Outer Hebrides (58°30′N 8°36′W) by SM U-46 (Imperial German Navy). Her crew survived but her captain was taken as a prisoner of war. |
| Mcclure | United Kingdom | World War I: The schooner was scuttled in the Mediterranean Sea 30 nautical miles (56 km) east of Cape Carbonara, Sardinia, Italy (38°59′N 10°15′E) by SM UC-35 (Imperial German Navy). Her crew survived. |
| HMT Rosevine | Royal Navy | The naval trawler was lost on this date. |
| Sant Antonio di Padova | Italy | World War I: The brigantine was scuttled in the Mediterranean Sea north west of Sicily (36°24′N 12°27′E) by SM U-65 (Imperial German Navy). |
| Thyra | Denmark | World War I: The schooner was scuttled in the English Channel 45 nautical miles (83 km) south south east of Start Point, Devon, United Kingdom by SM UB-38 (Imperial German Navy). Her crew survived. |
| Traveller | Denmark | World War I: The fishing smack was sunk in the Atlantic Ocean off the Faroe Islands by SM UC-33 (Imperial German Navy). Her crew survived. |
| SM UC-24 | Imperial German Navy | World War I: The Type UC II submarine was torpedoed and sunk in the Gulf of Kotor by Circé (French Navy) with the loss of all 26 crew. |

== 25 May ==
List of shipwrecks: 25 May 1917
| Ship | State | Description |
|---|---|---|
| A. H. Frijs | Denmark | World War I: The barquentine was sunk in the Atlantic Ocean 35 nautical miles (65 km) west south west of Suðuroy, Faroe Islands by SM UC-33 (Imperial German Navy). Her crew survived. |
| Argentina | Italy | World War I: The sailing vessel was sunk in the Mediterranean Sea off Sicily by SM UC-20 (Imperial German Navy). |
| Denebola | Imperial German Navy | World War I: The Aldebaran-class Vorpostenboot was sunk by mines off Westerems. |
| Diego Russo | Italy | World War I: The sailing vessel was sunk in the Tyrrhenian Sea south west of Policastro Bussentino, Campania by SM U-65 (Imperial German Navy). |
| Glyg | Norway | World War I: The coaster was sunk in the Atlantic Ocean 17 nautical miles (31 km) north north west of Muckle Flugga, Shetland Islands, United Kingdom by SM UC-33 (Imperial German Navy). Her crew survived. |
| HMS Hilary | Royal Navy | World War I: The armed merchant cruiser was torpedoed and sunk in the Atlantic Ocean 40 nautical miles (74 km) west of the Shetland Islands (60°33′N 3°00′W) by SM U-88 (Imperial German Navy). |
| Ida | Italy | World War I: The sailing vessel was sunk in the Mediterranean Sea off Sicily by SM UC-20 (Imperial German Navy). |
| Kohinur | United Kingdom | World War I: The cargo ship was torpedoed and sunk in the Mediterranean Sea 150 nautical miles (280 km) north west of Alexandria, Egypt (33°20′N 29°50′E) by SM U-38 (Imperial German Navy) with the loss of 37 crew. |
| Magnus Manson | United States | World War I: The five-masted schooner was captured and scuttled by gunfire and explosives that set her afire in the Atlantic Ocean 50 nautical miles (93 km) west by south of Cape St. Vincent, Spain by SM U-47 (Imperial German Navy). Her crew survived. |
| Natale Monaco | Italy | World War I: The sailing vessel was sunk in the Tyrrhenian Sea by SM U-65 (Imperial German Navy). |
| Nicolino | Italy | World War I: The sailing vessel was sunk in the Gulf of Genoa by SM UC-35 (Imperial German Navy). |
| Rosina R. | Italy | World War I: The sailing vessel was sunk in the Tyrrhenian Sea by SM U-65 (Imperial German Navy). |
| Sjaelland | United Kingdom | World War I: The cargo ship was shelled and sunk in the English Channel 18 nautical miles (33 km) east by north of Start Point, Devon by SM UC-66 (Imperial German Navy) with the loss of a crew member. |
| Vincenzino C. | Italy | World War I: The sailing vessel was sunk in the Tyrrhenian Sea by SM U-65 (Imperial German Navy). |
| Whinlatter | Norway | World War I: The barque was sunk in the Atlantic Ocean (61°04′N 2°53′W) by SM UC-33 (Imperial German Navy). Her crew survived. |

== 26 May ==
List of shipwrecks: 26 May 1917
| Ship | State | Description |
|---|---|---|
| Abd es Salaam | France | World War I: The sailing vessel was sunk in the Mediterranean Sea off Sicily, Italy, by SM UC-20 (Imperial German Navy). |
| Agragas | Italy | World War I: The cargo ship was sunk in the Mediterranean Sea off Syrte, Libya by SM UC-73 (Imperial German Navy). Her crew survived. |
| Angelo Padre | Italy | World War I: The sailing vessel was sunk in the Tyrrhenian Sea off Policastro Bussentino, Campania by SM U-65 (Imperial German Navy). |
| Aristides | Greece | World War I: The cargo ship was sunk in the Bay of Biscay 5 nautical miles (9.3 km) north north west of Cabo del Ajo, Spain by SM UC-21 (Imperial German Navy). Her crew survived. |
| Carlos de Eizaguirre | Spain | World War I: The ship struck a mine and sank off Cape Town, South Africa with the loss of 84 of the 108 people on board, or 126 of 150. There were 24 survivors. |
| Dandolo | France | World War I: The sailing vessel was sunk in the Mediterranean Sea off Sicily by SM UC-20 (Imperial German Navy). |
| Dorothy | Greece | World War I: The cargo ship was sunk in the Mediterranean Sea 45 nautical miles (83 km) off Cap d'Armi by SM UB-43 (Imperial German Navy). |
| HMHS Dover Castle | Royal Navy | ( Red Cross): World War I: The hospital ship was torpedoed and sunk in the Mediterranean Sea 50 nautical miles (93 km) north of Bône, Algeria (37°45′N 7°36′E) by SM UC-67 (Imperial German Navy) with the loss of seven crew. Survivors were rescued by HMS Cameleon (Royal Navy). |
| Holmesbank | United Kingdom | World War I: The collier was shelled and sunk in the Mediterranean Sea 90 nautical miles (170 km) north by west of Alexandria, Egypt (32°26′N 29°30′E) by SM U-38 (Imperial German Navy). Her crew survived. |
| Lucipara | Russia | World War I: The barque was sunk in the Atlantic Ocean 45 nautical miles (83 km) north west of Inishtrahull Island, County Donegal, United Kingdom (55°55′N 8°25′W) by SM U-87 (Imperial German Navy). |
| Manoubia | France | World War I: The sailing vessel was sunk in the Mediterranean Sea off Sicily by SM UC-20 (Imperial German Navy). |
| Messaouda | France | World War I: The sailing vessel was sunk in the Mediterranean Sea off Sicily by SM UC-20 (Imperial German Navy). |
| Norhaug | Norway | World War I: The cargo ship struck a mine and sank in the Bay of Biscay 10 nautical miles (19 km) west of Saint-Nazaire, Loire-Inférieure, France (47°13′N 2°33′W) with the loss of five of her crew. |
| Norway | Norway | World War I: The cargo liner was sunk in the Norwegian Sea 11 nautical miles (20 km) west of Holmengrå, Vestland by SM U-19 (Imperial German Navy). All passengers and crew survived. |
| Risorgimento | Italy | World War I: The schooner was scuttled in the Mediterranean Sea south of Sardinia (38°13′N 9°46′E) by SM UC-35 (Imperial German Navy). |
| Saint Hubert | France | World War I: The barque was scuttled in the English Channel 6 nautical miles (11 km) north north west of Cap La Hague, Manche by SM UC-45 (Imperial German Navy). |
| Saint Mirren | United Kingdom | World War I: The full-rigged ship was shelled and sunk in the Atlantic Ocean 45 nautical miles (83 km) north west of Inistrahull Island (55°55′N 8°25′W) by SM U-87 (Imperial German Navy). Her crew survived. |
| San Francesco | Italy | World War I: The sailing vessel was sunk in the Mediterranean Sea off Sicily by SM UC-20 (Imperial German Navy). Her crew survived. |
| Umaria | United Kingdom | World War I: The cargo ship was torpedoed and sunk in the Tyrrhenian Sea 20 nautical miles (37 km) south west by south of Policastro Bussentino (39°48′N 15°12′E) by SM U-65 (Imperial German Navy) with the loss of five crew. Three survivors were taken as prisoners of war. |
| Unione Salvatore | Italy | World War I: The sailing vessel was sunk in the Mediterranean Sea off Sicily by SM UC-20 (Imperial German Navy). |
| SMS V84 | Imperial German Navy | World War I: The V67-class torpedo boat struck a mine and sank in the North Sea with the loss of five of her crew. |

== 27 May ==
List of shipwrecks: 27 May 1917
| Ship | State | Description |
|---|---|---|
| Beatrice | Italy | World War I: The sailing vessel was sunk in the Strait of Sicily by SM U-33 (Imperial German Navy). |
| Boldwell | United Kingdom | World War I: The collier was torpedoed and sunk in the Mediterranean Sea 35 nautical miles (65 km) north east of Linosa, Italy (36°12′N 13°24′E) by SM UC-20 (Imperial German Navy) with the loss of three of her crew. |
| Dartmoor | United Kingdom | World War I: The cargo ship was torpedoed and sunk in the Atlantic Ocean 35 nautical miles (65 km) south east of the Fastnet Rock (51°09′N 8°46′W) by SM UC-50 (Imperial German Navy) with the loss of 25 of her crew. |
| Debora | Denmark | World War I: The three-masted schooner was captured and scuttled in the North Sea 70 nautical miles (130 km) west southwest of Lista, Vest-Agder, Norway (57°56′N 5°49′E) by SM U-19 (Imperial German Navy). Her crew survived. |
| Efstathios | Greece | World War I: The cargo ship was sunk in the Bay of Biscay 15 nautical miles (28 km) off Cape Penus by SM UC-21 (Imperial German Navy). |
| Général de Boisdeffre | France | World War I: The barque was sunk in the Atlantic Ocean 70 nautical miles (130 km) west of Ouessant, Finistère by SM UC-70 (Imperial German Navy) with the loss of all hands. |
| Luigi | Italy | World War I: The brigantine was sunk in the Mediterranean Sea off Ustica (38°58′N 15°49′E) by SM U-65 (Imperial German Navy). |
| Maria Giuseppe | Italy | World War I: The sailing vessel was sunk off the south coast of Italy by SM U-65 (Imperial German Navy). |
| Michele Constantino | Italy | World War I: The sailing vessels was sunk in the Strait of Sicily by SM U-33 (Imperial German Navy). Her crew survived. |
| SM UC-66 | Imperial German Navy | World War I: The Type UC II submarine was depth charged and sunk in the English Channel by HMT Sea King (Royal Navy) with the loss of all 26 crew. |

== 28 May ==
List of shipwrecks: 28 May 1917
| Ship | State | Description |
|---|---|---|
| Ancona | United Kingdom | World War I: The cargo ship was sunk in the Atlantic Ocean 110 nautical miles (200 km) west south west of Ouessant, Finistère, France by SM UC-70 (Imperial German Navy) with the loss of all hands. |
| Antinoe | United Kingdom | World War I: The cargo ship was torpedoed and sunk in the Atlantic Ocean 150 nautical miles (280 km) west south west of the Bishop Rock, Isles of Scilly (48°50′N 10°10′W) by SM U-86 (Imperial German Navy) with the loss of 21 of her crew. |
| Asters | Norway | World War I: The passenger ship, a barque, was torpedoed and sunk in the Atlantic Ocean 150 nautical miles (280 km) west by north of the Isles of Scilly (50°00′N 7°00′W) by SM UC-55 (Imperial German Navy). All on board survived. |
| Bars | Imperial Russian Navy | World War I: The Bars-class submarine was sunk in the Baltic Sea, probably by a mine. |
| Detlef Wagner | United Kingdom | World War I: The barquentine was shelled and sunk in the Atlantic Ocean 5 nautical miles (9.3 km) west of Ar Men, Finistère, France by SM UC-72 (Imperial German Navy). Her crew survived. |
| Hiram | Norway | World War I: The cargo ship was sunk in the Bay of Biscay 10 nautical miles (19 km) off Cape Vilano, Spain by SM UC-21 (Imperial German Navy). Her crew survived. |
| Limerick | United Kingdom | World War I: The refrigerated cargo liner was torpedoed and sunk in the Atlantic Ocean 140 nautical miles (260 km) west of the Bishop Rock (48°53′N 9°45′W) by SM U-86 (Imperial German Navy) with the loss of eight of her crew. |
| Nuevo S. Giovanni | Italy | World War I: The sailing vessel was sunk in the Mediterranean Sea off Cape Passero, Sicily by SM UC-25 (Imperial German Navy). |
| San Domenico | Italy | World War I: The sailing vessel was sunk in the Mediterranean Sea off Cape Passero by SM UC-25 (Imperial German Navy). |
| Teie | Norway | World War I: The full-rigged ship wasscuttled in the Atlantic Ocean 60 nautical miles (110 km) south of the Fastnet Rock (50°28′N 9°20′W) by SM UC-45 (Imperial German Navy). Her crew survived. |
| Turid | Norway | World War I: The cargo ship was sunk in the North Sea 25 nautical miles (46 km) north east by east of Peterhead, Aberdeenshire, United Kingdom by SM UC-44 (Imperial German Navy). Her crew survived. |
| Urna | Norway | World War I: The cargo ship was sunk in the Bay of Biscay 10 nautical miles (19 km) east by north of Cabo Prior, Spain by SM UC-21 (Imperial German Navy). Her crew survived. |
| Waldemar | Norway | World War I: The cargo ship was sunk in the Bay of Biscay 2.5 nautical miles (4.6 km) off Cabo Moras, Spain (43°47′N 7°28′W) by SM UC-21 (Imperial German Navy). Her crew survived. |

== 29 May ==
List of shipwrecks: 29 May 1917
| Ship | State | Description |
|---|---|---|
| Aghia Ton Aghion | Greece | World War I: The sailing vessel was sunk in the Mediterranean Sea north of Crete by SM UC-74 (Imperial German Navy). |
| Argo | Sweden | World War I: The schooner was sunk in the Atlantic Ocean north west of the Hebrides (59°06′N 8°49′W) by SM U-69 (Imperial German Navy). Her crew survived. |
| Ashleaf | United Kingdom | World War I: The tanker was torpedoed and sunk in the Atlantic Ocean 150 nautical miles (280 km) west of the Bishop Rock, Isles of Scilly (48°40′N 9°30′W) by SM U-88 (Imperial German Navy). Her crew survived. |
| Clan Murray | United Kingdom | World War I: The cargo ship was torpedoed and sunk in the Atlantic Ocean 40 nautical miles (74 km) west by south of the Fastnet Rock(50°57′N 10°21′W) by SM UC-55 (Imperial German Navy) with the loss of 64 lives. One survivor was taken as a prisoner of war. |
| Consul N. Nielsen | Denmark | World War I: The barque was sunk in the Atlantic Ocean north west of the Hebrides by SM U-69 (Imperial German Navy). Her crew survived. |
| Fridtjof Nansen | Norway | World War I: The cargo ship was sunk in the North Sea east of the Shetland Islands, United Kingdom (60°31′N 1°41′E) by SM U-28 (Imperial German Navy). Her crew survived. |
| Ines | Sweden | World War I: The brig was sunk in the Atlantic Ocean north west of the Hebrides (58°59′N 9°24′W) by SM U-69 (Imperial German Navy). She was manned by a British prize crew of four, who were taken as prisoners of war. |
| Karna | Norway | World War I: The sailing vessel was scuttled in the North Sea 70 kilometres (38 nmi) northeast of the Shetland Islands, United Kingdom (61°21′N 0°08′W) by SM U-28 (Imperial German Navy). Her crew survived. |
| Kirikos | Greece | World War I: The sailing vessel was sunk in the Mediterranean Sea north of Crete by SM UC-74 (Imperial German Navy). |
| Kodan | Norway | World War I: The three-masted schooner was scuttled in the North Sea 50 nautical miles (93 km) east of the Out Skerries, Shetland Islands, United Kingdom by SM U-28 (Imperial German Navy). Her crew survived. |
| Oswego | United Kingdom | World War I: The cargo ship was torpedoed and sunk in the Atlantic Ocean 175 nautical miles (324 km) west of the Bishop Rock, Isles of Scilly (48°44′N 10°15′W) by SM U-86 (Imperial German Navy). Her crew survived. |
| Yarra | France | World War I: The troopship was torpedoed and sunk in the Mediterranean Sea 20 nautical miles (37 km) north west of Cape Sidero, Crete (35°40′N 25°35′E) by SM UC-74 (Imperial German Navy) with the loss of at least 16 lives. Survivors were rescued by Arbalete, La Dedaigneuse (both French Navy) and HMS Lily (Royal Navy). |

== 30 May ==
List of shipwrecks: 30 May 1917
| Ship | State | Description |
|---|---|---|
| Bathurst | United Kingdom | World War I: The cargo ship was torpedoed and sunk in the Atlantic Ocean 90 nautical miles (170 km) west of the Bishop Rock, Isles of Scilly (49°23′N 8°43′W) by SM U-87 (Imperial German Navy). Her crew survived. |
| Corbet Woodall | United Kingdom | World War I: The coaster struck a mine and sank in the English Channel 1.5 nautical miles (2.8 km) east of the Nab Lightship (United Kingdom). Her crew survived. |
| Hanley | United Kingdom | World War I: The cargo ship was torpedoed and sunk in the Atlantic Ocean 95 nautical miles (176 km) west of the Bishop Rock (49°23′N 8°43′W) by SM U-87 (Imperial German Navy) with the loss of a crew member. |
| HMT Ina William | Royal Navy | World War I: The naval trawler struck a mine and sank in the Atlantic Ocean 2 nautical miles (3.7 km) south of the Bull Rock Lighthouse (51°43′N 10°18′W) with the loss of twelve of her crew. |
| Italia | French Navy | World War I: The armed boarding steamer was torpedoed and sunk by the submarine SM U-4 (Austro-Hungarian Navy) in the Mediterranean Sea 46 miles (74 km) southeast of Santa Maria di Leuca, Italy. |
| Lisbon | United Kingdom | World War I: The cargo ship struck a mine and sank in the English Channel 5 nautical miles (9.3 km) south of the Royal Sovereign Lightship (United Kingdom) (50°38′N 0°20′E) with the loss of a crew member. |
| Sørland | Norway | World War I: The cargo ship was sunk in the Atlantic Ocean (46°11′N 8°20′W) by SM UC-21 (Imperial German Navy). Her crew survived. |
| Unknown submarine | | World War I: A submarine was shelled and sunk by Silver Shell (United States) in a gun battle in the Mediterranean Sea. |

== 31 May ==
List of shipwrecks: 31 May 1917
| Ship | State | Description |
|---|---|---|
| Dirigo | United States | World War I: The four-masted barque was shelled, captured and scuttled with explosives in the Atlantic Ocean 6 nautical miles (11 km) south west of the Eddystone Lighthouse (50°09′N 4°28′W) by SM UB-23 (Imperial German Navy) with the loss of a crew member. |
| Esneh | United Kingdom | World War I: The cargo ship was torpedoed and sunk in the Atlantic Ocean 190 nautical miles (350 km) north west by west of Tory Island, County Donegal by SM U-69 (Imperial German Navy). Her crew survived. |
| Jeanne Cordonnier | France | World War I: The barque was shelled and sunk in the Atlantic Ocean 150 nautical miles (280 km) west of the Isles of Scilly, United Kingdom by SM U-88 (Imperial German Navy) with the loss of a crew member. |
| Miyazaki Maru | Japan | World War I: The passenger ship was sunk in the Atlantic Ocean 150 nautical miles (280 km) west of the Isles of Scilly (49°05′N 9°35′W) by SM U-88 (Imperial German Navy) with the loss of eight lives. |
| N. Hadzikyiakos | Greece | World War I: The cargo ship was sunk in the Atlantic Ocean (48°00′N 12°00′W) by SM U-86 (Imperial German Navy). |
| Ninotto | Italy | World War I: The sailing vessel was sunk in the Strait of Sicily (36°35′N 11°06′E) by SM UC-25 (Imperial German Navy). |
| Ozarda | United Kingdom | World War I: The cargo ship struck a mine and was damaged in the Mediterranean Sea off Port Said, Egypt. She was beached but was later refloated, repaired and returned to service. |
| Rosebank | United Kingdom | World War I: The cargo ship was torpedoed and sunk in the Mediterranean Sea 120 nautical miles (220 km) north of Benghazi, Libya (34°09′N 19°35′E) by SM UC-73 (Imperial German Navy) with the loss of two of her crew. Her captain was taken as a prisoner of war. |

== Unknown date ==
List of shipwrecks: Unknown date 1917
| Ship | State | Description |
|---|---|---|
| HMS C17 | Royal Navy | The C-class submarine sank after colliding with the destroyer HMS Lurcher (Royal Navy). She was later raised and repaired. |
| Kasaga II | United States | The steamer was blown up and burned at unspecified location and date. |
| SM UB-36 | Imperial German Navy | World War I: The Type UB II submarine was lost on active service after 9 May. Possibly struck a mine and sank in the North Sea off West Flanders, Belgium. All 22 crew lost. |
| Vanetian Maid | United States | The steamer sank in the Detroit River with the loss of one life. |
