= SS Sagamore (1893) =

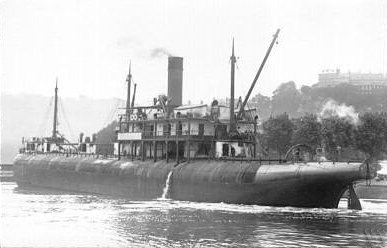
- Sagamore under way

History
- Name: 1893: Sagamore; 1911: Solideo; 1916: Ilva
- Owner: 1893: Belgian American Mar Co SA; 1897: Belgian Marine Trading Co; 1911: Cognati Schiaffino; 1914: Filippo Bertoletto; 1916: Soc Anon Ilva
- Operator: 1893: Wm Johnston & Co
- Port of registry: 1893: (Belgium) Antwerp; 1911: (Kingdom of Italy) Genoa
- Builder: William Doxford & Sons, Pallion
- Yard number: 218
- Fate: scuttled 4 May 1917

General characteristics
- Tonnage: 2,140 GRT, 1,601 NRT
- Length: 311.0 ft (94.8 m)
- Beam: 38.2 ft (11.6 m)
- Depth: 25.2 ft (7.7 m)
- Installed power: 233 NHP
- Propulsion: triple expansion engine

SS Sagamore was a steam cargo ship that was launched in 1893 and sunk in 1917. She was the only whaleback ship built in the United Kingdom, and one of only three whalebacks to operate outside the Great Lakes.

William Johnston & Co of Liverpool ordered Sagamore from William Doxford & Sons of Sunderland. Experience designing and building Sagamore led Doxford's to develop the turret deck ship.

In 1911 Johnston's sold Sagamore to Italian buyers who renamed her Solideo. In 1916 she changed hands again and was renamed Ilva. In 1917 a U-boat intercepted Ilva in the North Atlantic and scuttled her.

== Building ==
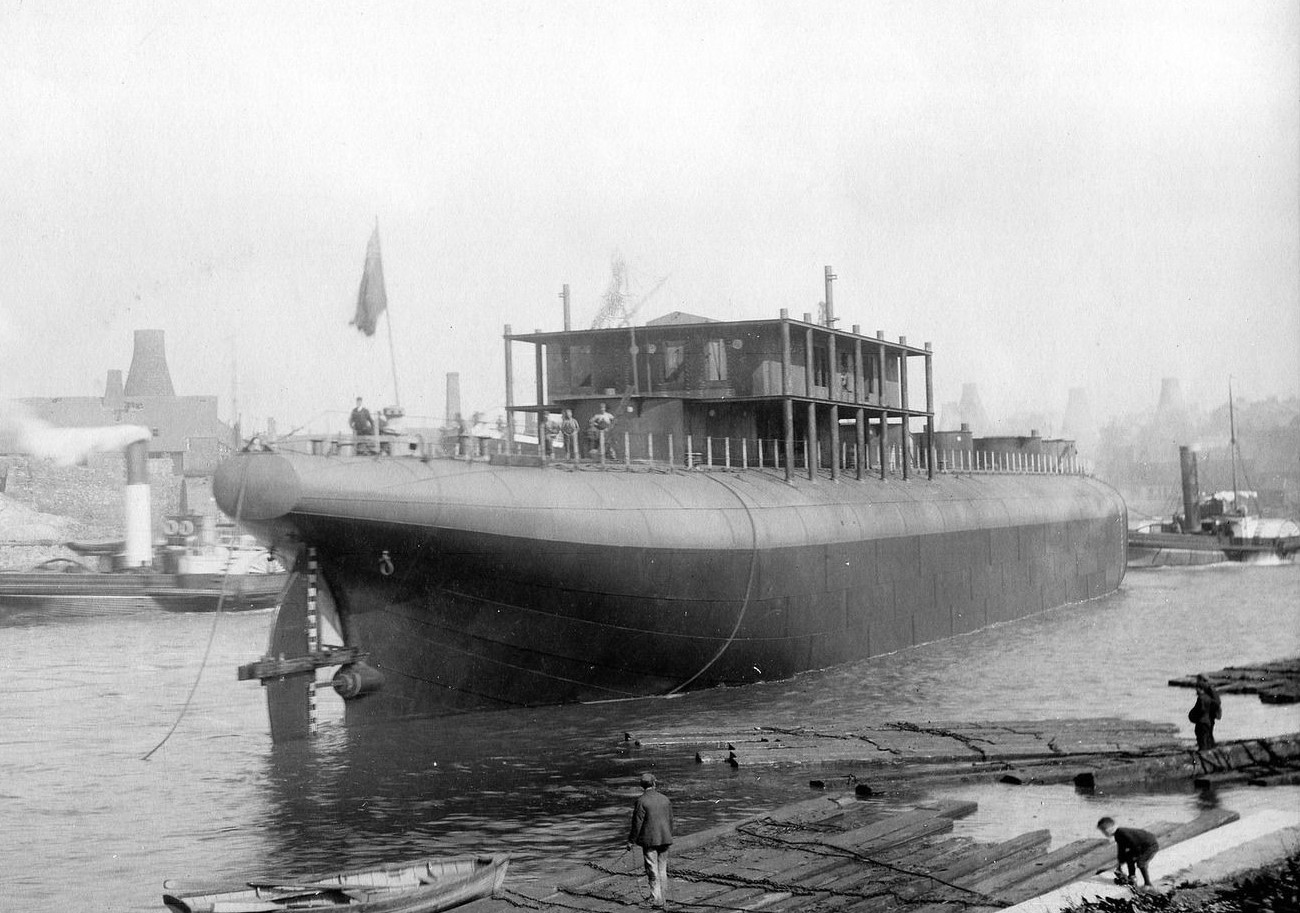
Sagamore on the River Wear in 1893 just after her launch

In 1891 the whaleback Charles W. Wetmore visited Liverpool, arousing interest among shipowners. William and Edmund Johnston, proprietors of William Johnston & Co of Liverpool, ordered Sagamore from Doxford's in Pallion, Sunderland. According to some sources, The Scottish-American shipmaster Alexander Dougall licensed her building.

Sagamore was launched on 15 June 1893 and completed that September. She had three masts and one funnel. She had a narrow deckhouse between her mainmast and mizzen mast. She had a single screw driven by a Doxford triple expansion engine.

== Belgian service ==
Sagamore's unorthodox design prevented her from being given a classification and load line for registration in the United Kingdom. Therefore Johnston's and Doxford's created a jointly owned subsidiary to own her, Belgian American Maritime Company SA, and registered her in Antwerp.

Like all whalebacks, Sagamore had hatches that were smaller than those of a conventional cargo ship. This impeded the handling of many types of cargo. Johnston's therefore used her as a bulk carrier, mostly taking grain from Black Sea ports. She also carried sugar from Cuba, manganese ore from Poti in Georgia, copper concentrates and iron ore from Spain and phosphates from Sfax in Tunisia.

In 1897 Johnston's transferred Sagamore to the Belgian Marine Trading Company. She remained registered in Antwerp.

== Italian service ==
In 1911 Johnston's sold Sagamore to Cognati Schiaffino, who renamed her Solideo and registered her in Genoa. In 1914 Filippo Bertoletto bought her. In 1916 Società Anonima Ilva bought her and renamed her Ilva.

On 4 May 1917 Ilva was in the North Atlantic about 5 nautical miles (9 km) northwest of Coelleira, sailing from Genoa to Barry Roads when UC-69 stopped her and scuttled her. There were no casualties.

== Significance ==
Sagamore was one of only three ocean-going whaleback ships. The others were the US cargo ships Charles W. Wetmore, launched in 1891, and City of Everett, launched in 1894. The experience of designing and building Sagamore inspired Doxford's to develop the turret deck ship, which achieved wider acceptance and of which 180 ocean-going examples were built.

== Bibliography ==
- Burrell, David (1992). Furness Withy 1891–1991. Kendal: World Ship Society. ISBN 0-905617-70-3.
- Woodman, Richard (2002) [1997]. The History of the Ship. London: Lyons Press (Globe Pequot Press) / Conway Maritime Press. ISBN 1-58574-621-5.
