= SM UB-20 =

U-boat

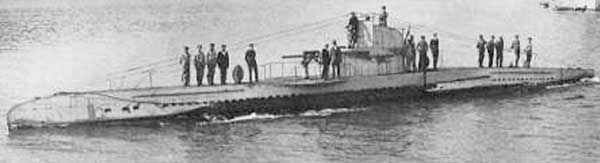
- SM UB-45, a U-boat similar to UB-20

History

German Empire
- Name: UB-20
- Ordered: 30 April 1915
- Builder: Blohm & Voss, Hamburg
- Yard number: 250
- Launched: 26 September 1915
- Completed: 8 February 1916
- Commissioned: 10 February 1916
- Fate: Sunk by mine, 28 July 1917

General characteristics
- Class & type: Type UB II submarine
- Displacement: 263 t (259 long tons) surfaced; 292 t (287 long tons) submerged
- Length: 36.13 m (118 ft 6 in) o/a; 27.13 m (89 ft) pressure hull
- Beam: 4.36 m (14 ft 4 in) o/a; 3.85 m (12 ft 8 in) pressure hull
- Draught: 3.70 m (12 ft 2 in)
- Propulsion: 1 × propeller shaft; 2 × 6-cylinder diesel engine, 284 PS (209 kW; 280 bhp); 2 × electric motor, 280 PS (210 kW; 280 shp)
- Speed: 9.15 knots (16.95 km/h; 10.53 mph) surfaced; 5.81 knots (10.76 km/h; 6.69 mph) submerged
- Range: 6,450 nmi (11,950 km; 7,420 mi) at 5 knots (9.3 km/h; 5.8 mph) surfaced; 45 nmi (83 km; 52 mi) at 4 knots (7.4 km/h; 4.6 mph) submerged
- Test depth: 50 m (160 ft)
- Complement: 2 officers, 21 men
- Armament: 2 × 50 cm (19.7 in) torpedo tubes; 4 × torpedoes (later 6); 1 × 5 cm SK L/40 gun
- Notes: 45-second diving time

Service record
- Part of: Baltic Flotilla; 12 March 1916 – 26 March 1917; Flandern Flotilla; 26 March – 28 July 1917
- Commanders: Oblt.z.S. Max Viebeg; 10 February 1916 – 31 January 1917; Oblt.z.S. Hermann Glimpf; 1 February – 28 July 1917
- Operations: 15 patrols
- Victories: 13 merchant ships sunk (10,230 GRT); 1 merchant ship damaged (7,241 GRT); 1 merchant ship taken as prize (1,047 GRT)

SM UB-20 (Note: "SM" stands for "Seiner Majestät" (English: His Majesty's) and combined with the U for Unterseeboot would be translated as His Majesty's Submarine.) was a German Type UB II submarine or U-boat in the German Imperial Navy (German: Kaiserliche Marine) during World War I. The U-boat was ordered on 30 April 1915 and launched on 26 September 1915. She was commissioned into the German Imperial Navy on 10 February 1916 as SM UB-20. The submarine sank 13 ships in 15 patrols for a total of 10,230 gross register tons (GRT). UB-20 was mined and sunk on 28 July 1917 at 51°21′N 2°38′E. Fifteen crew members died in the event.

== Design ==
A Type UB II submarine, UB-20 had a displacement of 263 tonnes (259 long tons) when at the surface and 292 tonnes (287 long tons) while submerged. She had a total length of 36.13 m (118 ft 6 in), a beam of 4.36 m (14 ft 4 in), and a draught of 3.70 m (12 ft 2 in). The submarine was powered by two Körting six-cylinder, four-stroke diesel engines each producing a total 284 metric horsepower (209 kW; 280 shp), a Siemens-Schuckert electric motor producing 280 metric horsepower (210 kW; 280 shp), and one propeller shaft. She was capable of operating at depths of up to 50 metres (160 ft).

The submarine had a maximum surface speed of 9.15 knots (16.95 km/h; 10.53 mph) and a maximum submerged speed of 5.81 knots (10.76 km/h; 6.69 mph). When submerged, she could operate for 45 nautical miles (83 km; 52 mi) at 4 knots (7.4 km/h; 4.6 mph); when surfaced, she could travel 6,650 nautical miles (12,320 km; 7,650 mi) at 5 knots (9.3 km/h; 5.8 mph). UB-20 was fitted with two 50 centimetres (20 in) torpedo tubes, four torpedoes, and one 5 cm (2.0 in) SK L/40 deck gun. She had a complement of twenty-three crew members and two officers and a 45-second dive time.

== Loss ==
At noon on 28.07.1917 UB 20 left Ostend for a four-hour sea trial in the area around West Hinder lightship. The boat did not return. (Pos. 51°21'N-02°38'E). The commander's body was washed up on the Jutland coast near Lodbjerg on 03.08.1917 and buried in the local cemetery.

== Summary of raiding history ==
Date	Name	Nationality	Tonnage (Note: Tonnages are in gross register tons)	Fate
2 August 1916	Bror Oskar	Sweden	368	Sunk
2 August 1916	Commerce	Sweden	638	Sunk
2 August 1916	Themis	Sweden	1,047	Captured as prize
2 August 1916	Vera	Sweden	312	Sunk
2 August 1916	Vermland	Sweden	213	Sunk
10 April 1917	Pluto	United Kingdom	1,266	Sunk
7 May 1917	Martha Maria	Netherlands	176	Sunk
7 May 1917	Prins Hendrik De Nederlande	Netherlands	182	Sunk
16 May 1917	Friso	Netherlands	171	Sunk
17 May 1917	Kilmaho	United Kingdom	2,155	Sunk
18 May 1917	Adventure	United Kingdom	50	Sunk
18 May 1917	Primrose	United Kingdom	62	Sunk
19 May 1917	Askild	Norway	2,540	Sunk
20 May 1917	Normand	Norway	2,097	Sunk
11 June 1917	Knight Companion	United Kingdom	7,241	Damaged

== Bibliography ==
- Bendert, Harald (2000). Die UB-Boote der Kaiserlichen Marine, 1914-1918. Einsätze, Erfolge, Schicksal (in German). Hamburg: Verlag E.S. Mittler & Sohn GmbH. ISBN 3-8132-0713-7.
- Gröner, Erich; Jung, Dieter; Maass, Martin (1991). U-boats and Mine Warfare Vessels. German Warships 1815–1945. Vol. 2. Translated by Thomas, Keith; Magowan, Rachel. London: Conway Maritime Press. ISBN 0-85177-593-4.
- Rössler, Eberhard (1979). Die deutschen U-Boote und ihre Werften: eine Bilddokumentation über den deutschen U-Bootbau; in zwei Bänden (in German). Vol. I. Munich: Bernard & Graefe. ISBN 3-7637-5213-7.
