= SM UC-58 =

History

German Empire
- Name: UC-58
- Ordered: 12 January 1916
- Builder: Kaiserliche Werft, Danzig
- Yard number: 40
- Laid down: 18 March 1916
- Launched: 21 October 1916
- Commissioned: 12 March 1917
- Fate: Surrendered, 24 November 1918; broken up, 1921

General characteristics
- Class & type: Type UC II submarine
- Displacement: 415 t (408 long tons), surfaced; 498 t (490 long tons), submerged
- Length: 52.69 m (172 ft 10 in) o/a; 40.96 m (134 ft 5 in) pressure hull
- Beam: 5.22 m (17 ft 2 in) o/a; 3.65 m (12 ft) pressure hull
- Draught: 3.61 m (11 ft 10 in)
- Propulsion: 2 × propeller shafts; 2 × 6-cylinder, 4-stroke diesel engines, 580–600 PS (430–440 kW; 570–590 shp); 2 × electric motors, 620 PS (460 kW; 610 shp)
- Speed: 11.6 knots (21.5 km/h; 13.3 mph), surfaced; 7.3 knots (13.5 km/h; 8.4 mph), submerged
- Range: 8,660–9,450 nmi (16,040–17,500 km; 9,970–10,870 mi) at 7 knots (13 km/h; 8.1 mph) surfaced; 52 nmi (96 km; 60 mi) at 4 knots (7.4 km/h; 4.6 mph) submerged
- Test depth: 50 m (160 ft)
- Complement: 26
- Armament: 6 × 100 cm (39.4 in) mine tubes; 18 × UC 200 mines; 3 × 50 cm (19.7 in) torpedo tubes (2 bow/external; one stern); 7 × torpedoes; 1 × 8.8 cm (3.5 in) Uk L/30 deck gun
- Notes: 30-second diving time

Service record
- Part of: Baltic Flotilla; 9 May – 11 December 1917; I Flotilla; 11 December 1917 – 11 November 1918
- Commanders: Oblt.z.S. / Kptlt. Karl Vesper; 12 March 1917 – 19 April 1918; Oblt.z.S. / Kptlt. Kurt Schwarz; 20 April – 11 November 1918
- Operations: 12 patrols
- Victories: 21 merchant ships sunk (21,030 GRT + Unknown GRT); 4 warships sunk (463 tons); 1 merchant ship damaged (4,125 GRT); 3 merchant ships taken as prize (2,716 GRT)

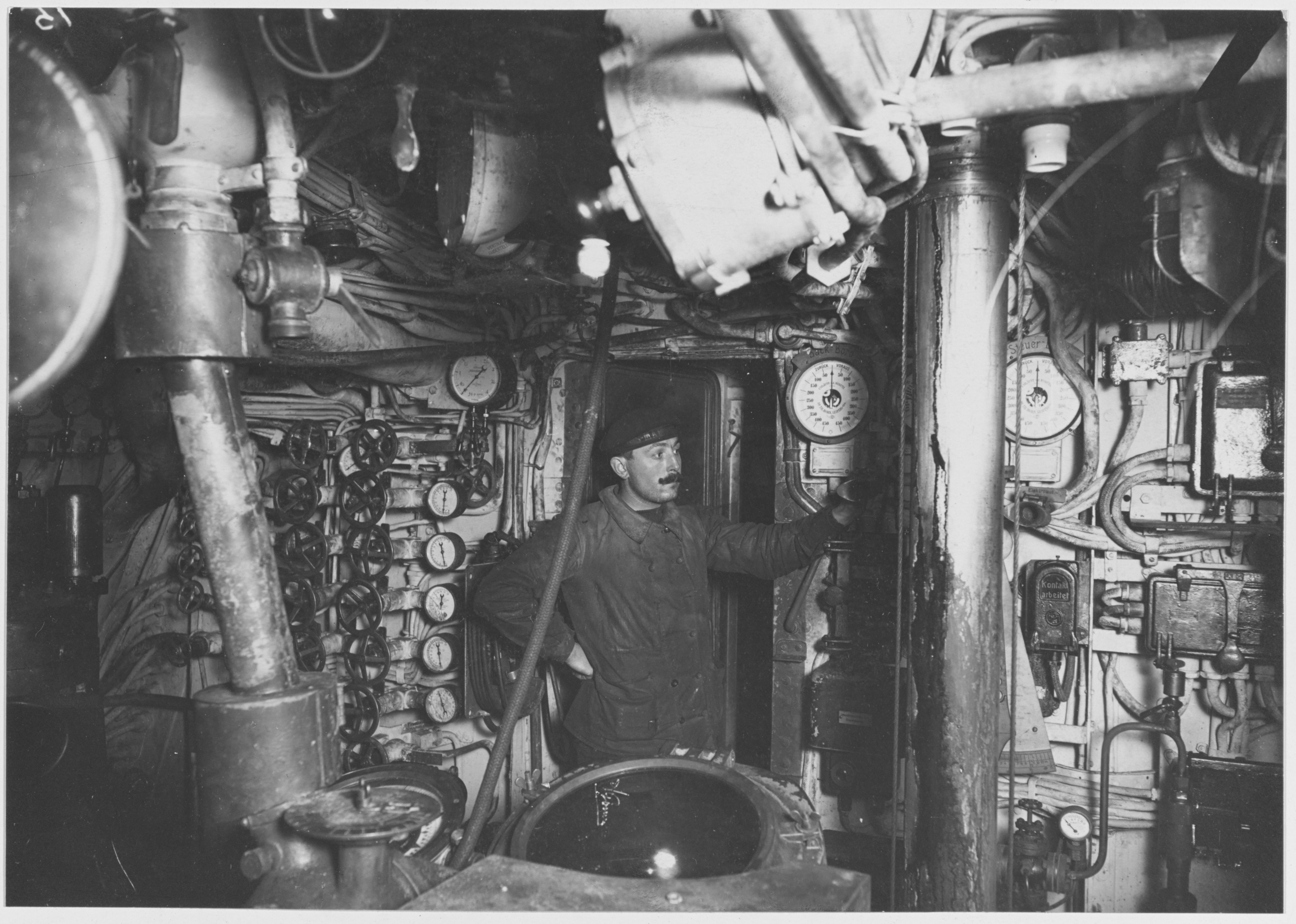
German submarine UC-58 NH 111103

SM UC-58 was a German Type UC II minelaying submarine or U-boat in the German Imperial Navy (German: Kaiserliche Marine) during World War I. The U-boat was ordered on 12 January 1916, laid down on 18 March 1916, and was launched on 21 October 1916. She was commissioned into the German Imperial Navy on 12 March 1917 as SM UC-58. (Note: "SM" stands for "Seiner Majestät" (English: His Majesty's) and combined with the U for Unterseeboot would be translated as His Majesty's Submarine.) In twelve patrols UC-58 was credited with sinking 25 ships, either by torpedo or by mines laid. UC-58 was surrendered on 24 November 1918 and broken up at Cherbourg in 1921.

== Design ==
A Type UC II submarine, UC-58 had a displacement of 415 tonnes (408 long tons) when at the surface and 498 tonnes (490 long tons) while submerged. She had a length overall of 50.52 m (165 ft 9 in), a beam of 5.22 m (17 ft 2 in), and a draught of 3.61 m (11 ft 10 in). The submarine was powered by two six-cylinder four-stroke diesel engines each producing 290–300 metric horsepower (210–220 kW; 290–300 shp) (a total of 580–600 metric horsepower (430–440 kW; 570–590 shp)), two electric motors producing 620 metric horsepower (460 kW; 610 shp), and two propeller shafts. She had a dive time of 48 seconds and was capable of operating at a depth of 50 metres (160 ft).

The submarine had a maximum surface speed of 11.6 knots (21.5 km/h; 13.3 mph) and a submerged speed of 7.3 knots (13.5 km/h; 8.4 mph). When submerged, she could operate for 52 nautical miles (96 km; 60 mi) at 4 knots (7.4 km/h; 4.6 mph); when surfaced, she could travel 8,660 to 9,450 nautical miles (16,040 to 17,500 km; 9,970 to 10,870 mi) at 7 knots (13 km/h; 8.1 mph). UC-58 was fitted with six 100 centimetres (39 in) mine tubes, eighteen UC 200 mines, three 50 centimetres (20 in) torpedo tubes (one on the stern and two on the bow), seven torpedoes, and one 8.8 cm (3.5 in) Uk L/30 deck gun. Her complement was twenty-six crew members.

== Summary of raiding history ==
Date	Name	Nationality	Tonnage (Note: Merchant ship tonnages are in gross register tons. Military vessels are listed by tons displacement.)	Fate
19 May 1917	Erik	Sweden	785	Sunk
19 May 1917	Göta	Sweden	1,128	Captured as a prize
19 May 1917	Kjell	Sweden	235	Sunk
19 May 1917	Kyros	Sweden	221	Sunk
19 May 1917	Lizzie	Sweden	1,095	Captured as a prize
19 May 1917	Märta	Sweden	493	Captured as a prize
19 May 1917	Olga	Sweden	83	Sunk
19 May 1917	Pauline	Sweden	168	Sunk
19 May 1917	Therese	Sweden	208	Sunk
3 June 1917	Sten II	Russian Empire	227	Sunk
6 June 1917	Edvard	Sweden	98	Sunk
6 June 1917	Elianna	Sweden	75	Sunk
11 June 1917	August	Sweden	120	Sunk
15 June 1917	Cleo	Sweden	92	Sunk
7 July 1917	MT 11	Imperial Russian Navy	29	Sunk
7 July 1917	MT 14	Imperial Russian Navy	29	Sunk
14 July 1917	Bonus	(Russian Empire) Grand Duchy of Finland	111	Sunk
10 September 1917	Sims	Russian Empire	Unknown	Sunk
27 November 1917	Bditelnyi	Imperial Russian Navy	380	Sunk
30 November 1917	MT 1	Imperial Russian Navy	25	Sunk
29 December 1917	Ennismore	United Kingdom	1,499	Sunk
1 January 1918	Eriksholm	Sweden	2,632	Sunk
12 January 1918	Adolph Meyer	Sweden	807	Sunk
11 February 1918	Baku Standard	United Kingdom	3,708	Sunk
12 February 1918	St. Magnus	United Kingdom	809	Sunk
13 February 1918	Lackawanna	United Kingdom	4,125	Damaged
18 May 1918	USS William Rockefeller	United States Navy	7,175	Sunk
28 June 1918	Pochard	United Kingdom	146	Sunk
17 September 1918	Muriel	United Kingdom	1,831	Sunk
