= SM UC-33 =

German Type UC II minelaying submarine or U-boat

History

German Empire
- Name: UC-33
- Ordered: 29 August 1915
- Builder: AG Vulcan, Hamburg
- Yard number: 72
- Launched: 26 August 1916
- Commissioned: 25 September 1916
- Fate: Sunk, 26 September 1917

General characteristics
- Class & type: Type UC II submarine
- Displacement: 400 t (390 long tons), surfaced; 480 t (470 long tons), submerged
- Length: 49.45 m (162 ft 3 in) o/a; 39.30 m (128 ft 11 in) pressure hull
- Beam: 5.22 m (17 ft 2 in) o/a; 3.65 m (12 ft) pressure hull
- Draught: 3.68 m (12 ft 1 in)
- Propulsion: 2 × propeller shafts; 2 × 6-cylinder, 4-stroke diesel engines, 500 PS (370 kW; 490 bhp); 2 × electric motors, 460 PS (340 kW; 450 shp)
- Speed: 11.6 knots (21.5 km/h; 13.3 mph), surfaced; 6.7 knots (12.4 km/h; 7.7 mph), submerged
- Range: 10,040 nmi (18,590 km; 11,550 mi) at 7 knots (13 km/h; 8.1 mph), surfaced; 53 nmi (98 km; 61 mi) at 4 knots (7.4 km/h; 4.6 mph), submerged
- Test depth: 50 m (160 ft)
- Complement: 26
- Armament: 6 × 100 cm (39.4 in) mine tubes; 18 × UC 200 mines; 3 × 50 cm (19.7 in) torpedo tubes (2 bow/external; one stern); 7 × torpedoes; 1 × 8.8 cm (3.5 in) Uk L/30 deck gun
- Notes: 48-second diving time

Service record
- Part of: I Flotilla; 16 December 1916 – 26 September 1917
- Commanders: Kptlt. Martin Schelle; 25 September 1916 – 19 July 1917; Oblt.z.S. Alfred Arnold; 20 July – 26 September 1917
- Operations: 7 patrols
- Victories: 31 merchant ships sunk (19,628 GRT); 1 warship sunk (370 tons); 4 auxiliary warships sunk (997 GRT); 1 merchant ship damaged (6,430 GRT)

SM UC-33 was a German Type UC II minelaying submarine or U-boat in the German Imperial Navy (German: Kaiserliche Marine) during World War I. The U-boat was ordered on 29 August 1915 and was launched on 26 August 1916. She was commissioned into the German Imperial Navy on 25 September 1916 as SM UC-33. (Note: "SM" stands for "Seiner Majestät" (English: His Majesty's) and combined with the U for Unterseeboot would be translated as His Majesty's Submarine.) In seven patrols UC-33 was credited with sinking 36 ships, either by torpedo or by mines laid. UC-33 was shelled and then rammed by patrol boat PC61 captained by Frank Worsley at position 51°55′N 6°14′W in St. George's Channel on 26 September 1917.

== Design ==
A Type UC II submarine, UC-33 had a displacement of 400 tonnes (390 long tons) when at the surface and 480 tonnes (470 long tons) while submerged. She had a length overall of 49.45 m (162 ft 3 in), a beam of 5.22 m (17 ft 2 in), and a draught of 3.68 m (12 ft 1 in). The submarine was powered by two six-cylinder four-stroke diesel engines each producing 250 metric horsepower (180 kW; 250 shp) (a total of 500 metric horsepower (370 kW; 490 shp)), two electric motors producing 460 metric horsepower (340 kW; 450 shp), and two propeller shafts. She had a dive time of 48 seconds and was capable of operating at a depth of 50 metres (160 ft).

The submarine had a maximum surface speed of 11.6 knots (21.5 km/h; 13.3 mph) and a submerged speed of 6.7 knots (12.4 km/h; 7.7 mph). When submerged, she could operate for 53 nautical miles (98 km; 61 mi) at 4 knots (7.4 km/h; 4.6 mph); when surfaced, she could travel 10,040 nautical miles (18,590 km; 11,550 mi) at 7 knots (13 km/h; 8.1 mph). UC-33 was fitted with six 100 centimetres (39 in) mine tubes, eighteen UC 200 mines, three 50 centimetres (20 in) torpedo tubes (one on the stern and two on the bow), seven torpedoes, and one 8.8 cm (3.5 in) Uk L/30 deck gun. Her complement was twenty-six crew members.

== Summary of raiding history ==
Date	Name	Nationality	Tonnage (Note: Merchant ship tonnages are in gross register tons. Military vessels are listed by tons displacement.)	Fate
8 February 1917	Derika	Netherlands	153	Sunk
14 February 1917	Eudora	United Kingdom	1,991	Sunk
18 February 1917	HMT Clifton	Royal Navy	242	Sunk
24 February 1917	HMY Verona	Royal Navy	437	Sunk
14 April 1917	Hermione	United Kingdom	4,011	Sunk
20 April 1917	HMT Loch Eye	Royal Navy	225	Sunk
21 April 1917	Jedburgh	United Kingdom	165	Sunk
21 April 1917	Yeovil	United Kingdom	164	Sunk
5 May 1917	Lodes	United Kingdom	396	Sunk
23 May 1917	Beinir	Denmark	73	Sunk
23 May 1917	Britannia	Denmark	69	Sunk
23 May 1917	Else	Denmark	78	Sunk
23 May 1917	Margrethe	Denmark	104	Sunk
23 May 1917	Olearia	United Kingdom	209	Sunk
23 May 1917	Sisapon	United Kingdom	211	Sunk
23 May 1917	Streymoy	Denmark	81	Sunk
24 May 1917	Brestir	Denmark	69	Sunk
24 May 1917	Isabella Innes	Denmark	37	Sunk
24 May 1917	Traveller	Denmark	76	Sunk
25 May 1917	A. H. Friis	Denmark	110	Sunk
25 May 1917	Glyg	Norway	358	Sunk
25 May 1917	Whinlatter	Norway	1,378	Sunk
28 June 1917	Corona	United Kingdom	48	Sunk
29 June 1917	Gem	United Kingdom	79	Sunk
29 June 1917	Manx Princess	United Kingdom	87	Sunk
30 June 1917	HMS Cheerful	Royal Navy	370	Sunk
30 June 1917	Germania	Sweden	1,064	Sunk
1 July 1917	Ariel	United Kingdom	108	Sunk
2 July 1917	General Buller	United Kingdom	72	Sunk
2 July 1917	Hamnavoe	United Kingdom	57	Sunk
6 July 1917	Handel en Visscherij	Netherlands	76	Sunk
6 July 1917	Piet Hein	Netherlands	100	Sunk
6 July 1917	Skjald	Norway	477	Sunk
7 July 1917	HMD Southesk	Royal Navy	93	Sunk
13 August 1917	Akassa	United Kingdom	3,919	Sunk
19 August 1917	Spectator	United Kingdom	3,808	Sunk
26 September 1917	San Zeferino	United Kingdom	6,430	Damaged
