= SM UC-73 =

1916 German type UC II minelaying U-boat

History

German Empire
- Name: UC-73
- Ordered: 12 January 1916
- Builder: Blohm & Voss, Hamburg
- Yard number: 289
- Launched: 26 August 1916
- Commissioned: 24 December 1916
- Fate: Surrendered, 6 January 1919; broken up, 1919 – 20

General characteristics
- Class & type: Type UC II submarine
- Displacement: 427 t (420 long tons), surfaced; 508 t (500 long tons), submerged
- Length: 50.35 m (165 ft 2 in) o/a; 40.30 m (132 ft 3 in) pressure hull
- Beam: 5.22 m (17 ft 2 in) o/a; 3.65 m (12 ft) pressure hull
- Draught: 3.64 m (11 ft 11 in)
- Propulsion: 2 × propeller shafts; 2 × 6-cylinder, 4-stroke diesel engines, 600 PS (440 kW; 590 shp); 2 × electric motors, 620 PS (460 kW; 610 shp)
- Speed: 12.0 knots (22.2 km/h; 13.8 mph), surfaced; 7.4 knots (13.7 km/h; 8.5 mph), submerged
- Range: 10,420 nmi (19,300 km; 11,990 mi) at 7 knots (13 km/h; 8.1 mph) surfaced; 52 nmi (96 km; 60 mi) at 4 knots (7.4 km/h; 4.6 mph) submerged
- Test depth: 50 m (160 ft)
- Complement: 26
- Armament: 6 × 100 cm (39.4 in) mine tubes; 18 × UC 200 mines; 3 × 50 cm (19.7 in) torpedo tubes (2 bow/external; one stern); 7 × torpedoes; 1 × 8.8 cm (3.5 in) Uk L/30 deck gun
- Notes: 35-second diving time

Service record
- Part of: Mittelmeer / Mittelmeer I Flotilla; 6 June 1917 – 11 November 1918
- Commanders: Kptlt. Kurt Schapler; 24 December 1916 – 26 November 1917; Oblt.z.S. Walter Wiedemann; 27 November 1917 – 29 May 1918; Oblt.z.S. Otto Gerke; 30 May – 14 July 1918; Oblt.z.S. Franz Hagen; 15 July – 2 December 1918
- Operations: 10 patrols
- Victories: 16 merchant ships sunk (16,565 GRT); 1 merchant ship damaged (5,796 GRT)

SM UC-73 (Note: "SM" stands for "Seiner Majestät" (English: His Majesty's) and combined with the U for Unterseeboot would be translated as His Majesty's Submarine.) was a German Type UC II minelaying submarine or U-boat in the German Imperial Navy (German: Kaiserliche Marine) during World War I. The U-boat was ordered on 12 January 1916 and was launched on 26 August 1916. She was commissioned into the German Imperial Navy on 24 December 1916 as SM UC-73. In ten patrols UC-73 was credited with sinking 16 ships, either by torpedo or by mines laid. UC-73 was surrendered on 6 January 1919 and broken up at Briton Ferry in 1919 – 20.

== Design ==
A Type UC II submarine, UC-73 had a displacement of 427 tonnes (420 long tons) when at the surface and 508 tonnes (500 long tons) while submerged. She had a length overall of 50.35 m (165 ft 2 in), a beam of 5.22 m (17 ft 2 in), and a draught of 3.64 m (11 ft 11 in). The submarine was powered by two six-cylinder four-stroke diesel engines each producing 300 metric horsepower (220 kW; 300 shp) (a total of 600 metric horsepower (440 kW; 590 shp)), two electric motors producing 620 metric horsepower (460 kW; 610 shp), and two propeller shafts. She had a dive time of 48 seconds and was capable of operating at a depth of 50 metres (160 ft).

The submarine had a maximum surface speed of 12 knots (22 km/h; 14 mph) and a submerged speed of 7.4 knots (13.7 km/h; 8.5 mph). When submerged, she could operate for 52 nautical miles (96 km; 60 mi) at 4 knots (7.4 km/h; 4.6 mph); when surfaced, she could travel 10,420 nautical miles (19,300 km; 11,990 mi) at 7 knots (13 km/h; 8.1 mph). UC-73 was fitted with six 100 centimetres (39 in) mine tubes, eighteen UC 200 mines, three 50 centimetres (20 in) torpedo tubes (one on the stern and two on the bow), seven torpedoes, and one 8.8 cm (3.5 in) Uk L/30 deck gun. Her complement was twenty-six crew members.

== Summary of raiding history ==
Date	Name	Nationality	Tonnage (Note: Tonnages are in gross register tons)	Fate
1 May 1917	Imberhorne	Finland	2,042	Sunk
3 May 1917	Mezly	France	1,568	Sunk
3 May 1917	Misurata	Kingdom of Italy	2,691	Sunk
26 May 1917	Agragas	Kingdom of Italy	850	Sunk
31 May 1917	Rosebank	United Kingdom	3,837	Sunk
28 August 1917	Saint Joseph	France	5,796	Damaged
7 October 1917	Georgios	Greece	560	Sunk
14 October 1917	Lido G.	Kingdom of Italy	1,003	Sunk
28 December 1917	Dauno	Kingdom of Italy	455	Sunk
29 March 1918	Unidentified sailing vessel (1 of 7)	Greece	18	Sunk
29 March 1918	Unidentified sailing vessel (2 of 7)	Greece	18	Sunk
29 March 1918	Unidentified sailing vessel (3 of 7)	Greece	18	Sunk
29 March 1918	Unidentified sailing vessel (4 of 7)	Greece	18	Sunk
29 March 1918	Unidentified sailing vessel (5 of 7)	Greece	5	Sunk
29 March 1918	Unidentified sailing vessel (6 of 7)	Greece	5	Sunk
29 March 1918	Unidentified sailing vessel (7 of 7)	Greece	5	Sunk
8 July 1918	Horta	Portugal	3,472	Sunk
