= SM UC-20 =

German Type UC II minelaying submarine or U-boat

History

German Empire
- Name: UC-20
- Ordered: 29 August 1915
- Builder: Blohm & Voss, Hamburg
- Yard number: 270
- Launched: 1 April 1916
- Commissioned: 7 September 1916
- Fate: Surrendered, 16 January 1919; broken up, 1919 – 20

General characteristics
- Class & type: Type UC II submarine
- Displacement: 417 t (410 long tons), surfaced; 493 t (485 long tons), submerged
- Length: 49.35 m (161 ft 11 in) o/a; 39.30 m (128 ft 11 in) pressure hull
- Beam: 5.22 m (17 ft 2 in) o/a; 3.65 m (12 ft) pressure hull
- Draught: 3.68 m (12 ft 1 in)
- Propulsion: 2 × propeller shafts; 2 × 6-cylinder, 4-stroke diesel engines, 500 PS (370 kW; 490 bhp); 2 × electric motors, 460 PS (340 kW; 450 shp)
- Speed: 11.6 knots (21.5 km/h; 13.3 mph), surfaced; 7.0 knots (13.0 km/h; 8.1 mph), submerged
- Range: 9,430 nmi (17,460 km; 10,850 mi) at 7 knots (13 km/h; 8.1 mph), surfaced; 55 nmi (102 km; 63 mi) at 4 knots (7.4 km/h; 4.6 mph), submerged
- Test depth: 50 m (160 ft)
- Complement: 26
- Armament: 6 × 100 cm (39.4 in) mine tubes; 18 × UC 200 mines; 3 × 50 cm (19.7 in) torpedo tubes (2 bow/external; one stern); 7 × torpedoes; 1 × 8.8 cm (3.5 in) Uk L/30 deck gun
- Notes: 35-second diving time

Service record
- Part of: Pola / Mittelmeer / Mittelmeer I Flotilla; 11 December 1916 – 11 November 1918
- Commanders: Kptlt. Franz Becker; 8 September 1916 – 8 May 1917; Oblt.z.S. Hans Adalbert von der Lühe; 9 May – 12 December 1917; Oblt.z.S. Otto Kümpel; 13 December 1917 – 10 January 1918; Oblt.z.S. Heinrich Kukat; 1 April – 18 June 1918; Oblt.z.S. Hermann Rohne; 19 June – 29 November 1918
- Operations: 13 patrols
- Victories: 21 merchant ships sunk (20,927 GRT); 3 merchant ships damaged (11,554 GRT)

SM UC-20 (Note: "SM" stands for "Seiner Majestät" (English: His Majesty's) and combined with the U for Unterseeboot would be translated as His Majesty's Submarine.) was a German Type UC II minelaying submarine or U-boat in the German Imperial Navy (German: Kaiserliche Marine) during World War I. The U-boat was ordered on 29 August 1915 and was launched on 1 April 1916. She was commissioned into the German Imperial Navy on 7 September 1916 as SM UC-20. In 13 patrols UC-20 was credited with sinking 21 ships, either by torpedo or by mines laid. UC-20 was surrendered on 16 January 1919 and broken up at Preston in 1919–20.

== Design ==
Like all pre-UC-25 Type UC II submarines, UC-20 had a displacement of 417 tonnes (410 long tons) when at the surface and 493 tonnes (485 long tons) while submerged. She had a total length of 49.35 m (161 ft 11 in), a beam of 5.22 m (17 ft 2 in), and a draught of 3.65 m (12 ft). The submarine was powered by two six-cylinder four-stroke diesel engines each producing 250 metric horsepower (180 kW; 250 shp) (a total of 500 metric horsepower (370 kW; 490 shp)), two electric motors producing 460 metric horsepower (340 kW; 450 shp), and two propeller shafts. She had a dive time of 35 seconds and was capable of operating at a depth of 50 metres (160 ft).

The submarine had a maximum surface speed of 11.6 knots (21.5 km/h; 13.3 mph) and a submerged speed of 7 knots (13 km/h; 8.1 mph). When submerged, she could operate for 55 nautical miles (102 km; 63 mi) at 4 knots (7.4 km/h; 4.6 mph); when surfaced, she could travel 9,430 nautical miles (17,460 km; 10,850 mi) at 7 knots (13 km/h; 8.1 mph). UC-20 was fitted with six 100 centimetres (39 in) mine tubes, eighteen UC 200 mines, three 50 centimetres (20 in) torpedo tubes (one on the stern and two on the bow), seven torpedoes, and one 8.8 cm (3.5 in) Uk L/30 deck gun. Her complement was twenty-six crew members.

== Summary of raiding history ==
Date	Name	Nationality	Tonnage (Note: Tonnages are in gross register tons)	Fate
19 October 1916	Frits Emil	Denmark	194	Sunk
17 November 1916	Emilia	Portugal	1,159	Sunk
10 April 1917	Abd Razik	Tunisia	25	Sunk
11 April 1917	Candia	Kingdom of Italy	1,045	Sunk
14 April 1917	Cinque Ottobre	Kingdom of Italy	39	Sunk
14 April 1917	Progresso	Kingdom of Italy	31	Sunk
15 April 1917	Alessio Cocco	Kingdom of Italy	29	Sunk
18 May 1917	Millicent Knight	United Kingdom	3,563	Sunk
25 May 1917	Argentina	Kingdom of Italy	97	Sunk
25 May 1917	Ida	Kingdom of Italy	46	Sunk
26 May 1917	Unione Salvatore	Kingdom of Italy	57	Sunk
26 May 1917	Abd es Salem	France	25	Sunk
26 May 1917	Dandolo	France	50	Sunk
26 May 1917	Manoubia	France	50	Sunk
26 May 1917	Messaouda	France	50	Sunk
26 May 1917	San Francesco	Kingdom of Italy	47	Sunk
27 May 1917	Boldwell	United Kingdom	3,118	Sunk
26 August 1917	Maurizio P.	Kingdom of Italy	558	Sunk
4 January 1918	Regina Elena	Kingdom of Italy	7,940	Sunk
13 April 1918	Giove	Kingdom of Italy	5,037	Damaged
28 April 1918	Verdun	France	2,769	Sunk
4 May 1918	Mergellina	Kingdom of Italy	354	Damaged
4 June 1918	Strombus	United Kingdom	6,163	Damaged
12 June 1918	Poincare	Tunisia	35	Sunk
