= SM UC-69 =

German Type UC II minelaying U-boat

History

German Empire
- Name: UC-69
- Ordered: 12 January 1916
- Builder: Blohm & Voss, Hamburg
- Yard number: 285
- Launched: 7 August 1916
- Commissioned: 22 December 1916
- Fate: Sunk after collision with U-96, 6 December 1917

General characteristics
- Class & type: Type UC II submarine
- Displacement: 427 t (420 long tons), surfaced; 508 t (500 long tons), submerged
- Length: 50.35 m (165 ft 2 in) o/a; 40.30 m (132 ft 3 in) pressure hull
- Beam: 5.22 m (17 ft 2 in) o/a; 3.65 m (12 ft) pressure hull
- Draught: 3.64 m (11 ft 11 in)
- Propulsion: 2 × propeller shafts; 2 × 6-cylinder, 4-stroke diesel engines, 600 PS (440 kW; 590 shp); 2 × electric motors, 620 PS (460 kW; 610 shp)
- Speed: 12.0 knots (22.2 km/h; 13.8 mph), surfaced; 7.4 knots (13.7 km/h; 8.5 mph), submerged
- Range: 10,420 nmi (19,300 km; 11,990 mi) at 7 knots (13 km/h; 8.1 mph) surfaced; 52 nmi (96 km; 60 mi) at 4 knots (7.4 km/h; 4.6 mph) submerged
- Test depth: 50 m (160 ft)
- Complement: 26
- Armament: 6 × 100 cm (39.4 in) mine tubes; 18 × UC 200 mines; 3 × 50 cm (19.7 in) torpedo tubes (2 bow/external; one stern); 7 × torpedoes; 1 × 8.8 cm (3.5 in) Uk L/30 deck gun
- Notes: 35-second diving time

Service record
- Part of: Flandern / Flandern II Flotilla; 6 March - 6 December 1917
- Commanders: Kptlt. Erwin Waßner; 23 December 1916 – 8 August 1917; Oblt.z.S. Hugo Thielmann; 9 August – 6 December 1917
- Operations: 9 patrols
- Victories: 54 merchant ships sunk (99,285 GRT + Unknown GRT); 3 merchant ships damaged (16,705 GRT); 1 warship damaged (975 tons); 1 auxiliary warship damaged (862 GRT)

SM UC-69 was a German Type UC II minelaying submarine or U-boat in the German Imperial Navy (German: Kaiserliche Marine) during World War I. The U-boat was ordered on 12 January 1916 and was launched on 7 August 1916. She was commissioned into the German Imperial Navy on 22 December 1916 as SM UC-69. (Note: "SM" stands for "Seiner Majestät" (English: His Majesty's) and combined with the U for Unterseeboot would be translated as His Majesty's Submarine.) In nine patrols UC-69 was credited with sinking 54 ships, either by torpedo or by mines laid. UC-69 was sunk after being accidentally rammed by U-96 near Barfleur on 6 December 1917. The wreck was accidentally discovered in November 2017 by the Dutch naval mine sweeper Zr.Ms. Makkum which was mapping the sea-bed off the French Normandy coast.

== Design ==
A Type UC II submarine, UC-69 had a displacement of 427 tonnes (420 long tons) when at the surface and 508 tonnes (500 long tons) while submerged. She had a length overall of 50.35 m (165 ft 2 in), a beam of 5.22 m (17 ft 2 in), and a draught of 3.64 m (11 ft 11 in). The submarine was powered by two six-cylinder four-stroke diesel engines each producing 300 metric horsepower (220 kW; 300 shp) (a total of 600 metric horsepower (440 kW; 590 shp)), two electric motors producing 620 metric horsepower (460 kW; 610 shp), and two propeller shafts. She had a dive time of 48 seconds and was capable of operating at a depth of 50 metres (160 ft).

The submarine had a maximum surface speed of 12 knots (22 km/h; 14 mph) and a submerged speed of 7.4 knots (13.7 km/h; 8.5 mph). When submerged, she could operate for 52 nautical miles (96 km; 60 mi) at 4 knots (7.4 km/h; 4.6 mph); when surfaced, she could travel 10,420 nautical miles (19,300 km; 11,990 mi) at 7 knots (13 km/h; 8.1 mph). UC-69 was fitted with six 100 centimetres (39 in) mine tubes, eighteen UC 200 mines, three 50 centimetres (20 in) torpedo tubes (one on the stern and two on the bow), seven torpedoes, and one 8.8 cm (3.5 in) Uk L/30 deck gun. Her complement was twenty-six crew members.

== Summary of raiding history ==
Date	Name	Nationality	Tonnage (Note: Merchant ship tonnages are in gross register tons. Military vessels are listed by tons displacement.)	Fate
12 March 1917	HMS Skate	Royal Navy	975	Damaged
25 March 1917	Huntleys	United Kingdom	186	Sunk
25 March 1917	Mary Annie	United Kingdom	154	Sunk
26 March 1917	Norma	Sweden	1,443	Sunk
27 March 1917	Aasta	Norway	1,146	Sunk
27 March 1917	Grib	Norway	1,474	Sunk
27 March 1917	Thracia	United Kingdom	2,891	Sunk
28 March 1917	Katina	Greece	2,464	Sunk
29 March 1917	Morild I	Norway	1,354	Sunk
30 March 1917	Avanguardia	Kingdom of Italy	2,703	Sunk
30 March 1917	Britta	Norway	2,061	Sunk
31 March 1917	Farmand	Norway	1,387	Sunk
1 May 1917	Barreiro	Portugal	1,738	Sunk
3 May 1917	Maria	Greece	2,754	Sunk
3 May 1917	Polstad	Norway	2,692	Sunk
4 May 1917	Ilva	Kingdom of Italy	2,140	Sunk
4 May 1917	Ioannis P. Goulandris	Greece	3,153	Sunk
4 May 1917	Tromp	Norway	2,751	Sunk
6 May 1917	Gurth	Norway	1,340	Sunk
6 May 1917	Voss	Norway	2,390	Sunk
7 May 1917	Leikanger	Norway	3,544	Sunk
7 May 1917	Tiger	Norway	3,273	Sunk
22 May 1917	Nann Smith	Norway	2,093	Sunk
12 June 1917	Alexandre	France	697	Sunk
14 June 1917	Hasting	Sweden	983	Sunk
15 June 1917	Addah	United Kingdom	4,397	Sunk
16 June 1917	La Tour D’agon	France	125	Sunk
17 June 1917	Marguerite VI	French Navy	862	Damaged
19 June 1917	Bearn	France	1,288	Sunk
19 June 1917	Spind	Norway	1,174	Sunk
20 June 1917	Katerina	Greece	3,092	Sunk
21 June 1917	E. T. Nygaard	Denmark	1,923	Sunk
24 June 1917	Cabo Verde	Portugal	2,220	Sunk
24 June 1917	Helma	Norway	1,131	Sunk
10 July 1917	Kansan	United States	7,913	Sunk
20 July 1917	Kageshima Maru	Japan	4,697	Sunk
23 July 1917	Frithjof	Norway	1,389	Sunk
24 July 1917	Sir Walter	United Kingdom	492	Sunk
25 July 1917	Baldwin	Norway	1,130	Sunk
26 July 1917	Bertha	Portugal	107	Sunk
26 July 1917	Locksley	Norway	2,487	Sunk
26 July 1917	Venturoso	Portugal	290	Sunk
28 July 1917	Hildur	Norway	961	Sunk
29 July 1917	Gyldenpris	Norway	2,667	Sunk
10 August 1917	War Patrol	United Kingdom	2,045	Sunk
1 September 1917	Erato	United Kingdom	2,041	Sunk
2 September 1917	Ker Durand	France	56	Sunk
2 September 1917	Rytonhall	United Kingdom	4,203	Sunk
4 September 1917	Sadi Carnot	France	354	Sunk
5 September 1917	Alesia	France	6,006	Damaged
15 September 1917	Sommeina	United Kingdom	3,317	Sunk
26 September 1917	Acorn	United Kingdom	112	Sunk
26 September 1917	Port Victor	United Kingdom	7,280	Damaged
6 October 1917	Lamartine	France	424	Sunk
6 October 1917	Le Coq	United Kingdom	3,419	Damaged
2 November 1917	Farraline	United Kingdom	1,226	Sunk
27 November 1917	Gladys	United Kingdom	179	Sunk
9 February 1918	Fantoft	Norway	1,034	Sunk
19 September 1918	Belliqueux	France	Unknown	Sunk
