= List of shipwrecks in July 1917 =

The list of shipwrecks in July 1917 includes ships sunk, foundered, grounded, or otherwise lost during July 1917.

== 1 July ==
For the loss of the Norwegian barque Asalia on this date, see the entry for 30 June 1917

List of shipwrecks: 1 July 1917
Ship	State	Description
Advance	United Kingdom	World War I: The fishing smack was shelled and sunk in the North Sea by SM UC-63 (Imperial German Navy). Her crew survived.
Amstelland	Netherlands	World War I: The cargo ship was sunk in the Atlantic Ocean 35 nautical miles (65 km) south of Galley Head, County Cork, United Kingdom by SM UC-31 (Imperial German Navy).
Angela Madre	Italy	World War I: The sailing vessel was sunk in the Mediterranean Sea south of Sardinia by SM UC-67 (Imperial German Navy).
Ariel	United Kingdom	World War I: The schooner was scuttled in the North Sea 15 nautical miles (28 km) east north east of Rattray Head, Aberdeenshire (57°45′N 1°12′W) by SM UC-33 (Imperial German Navy). Her crew survived.
Bachi	Spain	World War I: The cargo ship was sunk in the Bay of Biscay west of Sables d'Olonne, Vendée, France by SM U-84 (Imperial German Navy).
Corrado	Italy	World War I: The sailing vessel was sunk in the Mediterranean Sea between Sardinia and Sicily by SM U-38 (Imperial German Navy).
Demerara	United Kingdom	World War I: The passenger ship was torpedoed and damaged in the Bay of Biscay 6 nautical miles (11 km) west of Sables d'Olonne by SM U-84 (Imperial German Navy) with the loss of a crew member. She was beached on the Île de Ré but was later refloated.
Don Emilio	United Kingdom	World War I: The cargo ship was torpedoed and sunk in the Atlantic Ocean 10 nautical miles (19 km) north west by west of the Esha Ness Lighthouse, Shetland Islands (60°33′N 2°08′W) by SM U-80 (Imperial German Navy) with the loss of a crew member.
Eclipse	United Kingdom	World War I: The trawler was shelled and sunk in the Atlantic Ocean 100 nautical miles (190 km) north by west of Brough of Birsay, Orkney Islands by SM U-45 (Imperial German Navy). Her crew survived.
Gleam	United Kingdom	World War I: The fishing smack was shelled and sunk in the North Sea by SM UC-63 (Imperial German Navy). Her crew survived.
Marie	France	World War I: The sailing vessel was sunk in the Mediterranean Sea west of Sardinia by SM U-63 (Imperial German Navy).
Militades Embiricos	Greece	World War I: The cargo ship was sunk in the Mediterranean Sea north of Bizerta, Algeria (37°58′N 9°40′E) by SM UC-67 (Imperial German Navy). Her crew survived.
Radiance	United Kingdom	World War I: The fishing smack was scuttled in the North Sea by SM UC-63 (Imperial German Navy). Her crew survived.
Volto Santo G.	Italy	World War I: The sailing vessel was sunk in the Mediterranean Sea between Sardinia and Sicily (38°25′N 10°51′E) by SM U-38 (Imperial German Navy).

== 2 July ==
List of shipwrecks: 2 July 1917
Ship	State	Description
Argentario	Italy	World War I: The barque was scuttled in the Mediterranean Sea south of Sardinia (38°08′N 9°51′E) by SM U-63 (Imperial German Navy).
Bessie	Sweden	World War I: The trawler was shelled and sunk in the North Sea (61°55′N 1°10′E) by SM U-86 (Imperial German Navy). Her crew survived.
General Buller	United Kingdom	World War I: The drifter was shelled and sunk in the North Sea off Sumburgh Head, Shetland Islands by SM UC-33 (Imperial German Navy). Her crew survived.
Hamnavoe	United Kingdom	World War I: The drifter was shelled and sunk in the North Sea off Sumburgh Head by SM UC-33 (Imperial German Navy). Her crew survived.
May Flower	Sweden	World War I: The fishing vessel was shelled and sunk in the North Sea north of the Shetland Islands, United Kingdom (61°40′N 1°20′E) by SM U-57 (Imperial German Navy). Her crew survived.
Shinsan Maru	Japan	World War I: The cargo ship was sunk in the Mediterranean Sea by SM UB-47 (Imperial German Navy).
Thirlby	United Kingdom	World War I: The cargo ship was torpedoed and sunk in the Atlantic Ocean 122 nautical miles (226 km) north west by west of the Fastnet Rock (51°39′N 12°52′W) by SM UC-31 (Imperial German Navy) with the loss of two of her crew.

== 3 July ==
List of shipwrecks: 3 July 1917
Ship	State	Description
Cimbria	Denmark	World War I: The three-masted schooner was sunk in the Atlantic Ocean west of the Shetland Islands, United Kingdom (60°09′N 5°50′W) by SM U-49 (Imperial German Navy). Her crew survived.
City of Cambridge	United Kingdom	World War I: The cargo ship was torpedoed and sunk in the Mediterranean Sea 10 nautical miles (19 km) north west of Jijelli, Algeria by SM UC-67 (Imperial German Navy). Her crew survived.
HMT Drake II	Royal Navy	The naval trawler was wrecked in the Kenmare River, County Kerry.
Henrik	Norway	World War I: The cargo ship was torpedoed and sunk in the Bay of Biscay 60 nautical miles (110 km) west south west of Penmarc'h, Finistère, France (47°25′N 5°22′W) by SM UC-72 (Imperial German Navy). Her crew survived.
Iceland	United Kingdom	World War I: The cargo ship was torpedoed and sunk in the Atlantic Ocean 10 nautical miles (19 km) south west of Galley Head, County Cork by SM U-88 (Imperial German Navy) with the loss of two of her crew.
Immacolatina	Italy	World War I: The sailing vessel was sunk in the Mediterranean Sea west of Sicily by SM U-63 (Imperial German Navy).
Marthe Roux	France	World War I: The barque was scuttled in the Mediterranean Sea 25 nautical miles (46 km) off Cape Ivi, Algeria (36°30′N 0°13′E) by SM U-34 (Imperial German Navy).
Mary Boyes	Denmark	World War I: The fishing vessel was sunk in the Atlantic Ocean west of the Shetland Islands (60°09′N 5°50′W) by SM U-49 (Imperial German Navy). Her crew survived.
Matador	United Kingdom	World War I: The cargo ship was torpedoed and sunk in the Atlantic Ocean 115 nautical miles (213 km) west by north of the Fastnet Rock (51°16′N 12°25′W) by SM UC-31 (Imperial German Navy) with the loss of two of her crew.
Mongara	United Kingdom	World War I: The passenger ship was torpedoed and sunk in the Mediterranean Sea 1.5 nautical miles (2.8 km) off Messina, Sicily, Italy (38°10′N 15°36′E) by SM U-28 (Austro-Hungarian Navy). All on board survived.
Orleans	United States	World War I: The cargo ship was torpedoed and sunk in the Atlantic Ocean 165 nautical miles (306 km) west south west of Belle Île, Morbihan, France (47°12′N 7°40′W) by SM UC-71 (Imperial German Navy) with the loss of four of her crew.
Proefneming I	Netherlands	World War I: The fishing vessel was sunk in the Atlantic Ocean west of the Shetland Islands (60°09′N 5°50′W) by SM U-49 (Imperial German Navy). Her crew survived.
Thor	Netherlands	World War I: The fishing vessel was shelled and sunk in the Atlantic Ocean west of the Shetland Islands (60°09′N 5°50′W by SM U-49 (Imperial German Navy). Her crew survived.

== 4 July ==
List of shipwrecks: 4 July 1917
Ship	State	Description
HMS Aster	Royal Navy	World War I: The Acacia-class sloop struck a mine and sank in the Mediterranean Sea off Malta with the loss of ten of her 77 crew.
Bestevaer	Netherlands	World War I: The cargo ship was sunk in the North Sea 6 nautical miles (11 km) off Scheveningen, South Holland by SM UC-21 (Imperial German Navy). Her crew survived.
Chrysolite	United Kingdom	World War I: The fishing smack struck a mine and sank in the North Sea 4 nautical miles (7.4 km) north of the Haisbro Lightship (United Kingdom) with the loss of five of her crew.
Fratelli Bianchi	Italy	World War I: The cargo ship was torpedoed and sunk in the Mediterranean Sea 4 nautical miles (7.4 km) off Cap de l'Aiguille (36°05′N 1°09′W) by SM U-34 (Imperial German Navy).
Goathland	United Kingdom	World War I: The cargo ship was torpedoed and sunk in the Bay of Biscay 6.32 nautical miles (11.70 km) off Belle Île, Morbihan, France (47°11′N 3°08′W by SM U-84 (Imperial German Navy) with the loss of 21 of her crew. One of the survivors was rescued by SM U-84.
Hurstside	United Kingdom	World War I: The cargo ship was torpedoed and sunk in the Atlantic Ocean 108 nautical miles (200 km) north north east of Cape Wrath, Sutherland (60°25′N 4°38′W) by SM UC-54 (Imperial German Navy). Her crew survived.
Kodan	Denmark	World War I: The schooner was scuttled in the Atlantic Ocean north west of Ireland by SM U-93 (Imperial German Navy). Her crew survived.
Loch Katrine	United Kingdom	World War I: The trawler was shelled and sunk in the North Sea 85 nautical miles (157 km) east south east of Sandoy, Faroe Islands by SM U-87 (Imperial German Navy). Her crew survived.
HMS Mona	Royal Navy	The Q-ship was lost in the Mediterranean Sea on this date.
Snetoppen	Norway	World War I: The cargo ship was sunk in the Atlantic Ocean 100 nautical miles (190 km) west south west of Ouessant, Finistère, France (47°30′N 7°05′W) by SM UC-71 (Imperial German Navy). Her crew survived.
Ull	Norway	World War I: The coaster was sunk in the English Channel 9 nautical miles (17 km) west north west of Portland Bill, Dorset, United Kingdom by SM UC-61 (Imperial German Navy). Her crew survived.
Unknown submarine	Unknown	World War I: The submarine was shelled and sunk in the English Channel in a gun battle with the tanker Navajo (United States).

== 5 July ==
List of shipwrecks: 5 July 1917
Ship	State	Description
Bjerkø	Norway	World War I: The cargo ship was torpedoed and sunk in the English Channel 7 nautical miles (13 km) north west of the Triagoz Lighthouse, Finistère, France (48°50′N 3°51′W) by SM UB-18 (Imperial German Navy) with the loss of sixteen crew.
Ciboure	France	World War I: The cargo ship was sunk in the Mediterranean Sea 22 nautical miles (41 km) south west of Gozo, Malta (35°55′N 13°41′E) by SM U-65 (Imperial German Navy).
Cumberland	Australia	World War I: The coastal cargo ship was damaged by a mine off Gabo Island and was beached, partially sunk. Temporary repairs were made and she was refloated and towed off on 11 August.
Cuyahoga	United Kingdom	World War I: The cargo ship was torpedoed and sunk in the Atlantic Ocean 130 nautical miles (240 km) west north west of Tory Island, County Donegal (55°12′N 12°10′W) by SM U-57 (Imperial German Navy). Her crew survived.
Havbris	Norway	World War I: The coaster was torpedoed and sunk in the English Channel 3 nautical miles (5.6 km) south west of Prawle Point, Devon, United Kingdom by SM UB-32 (Imperial German Navy). Her crew survived.
Marionga Goulandris	Greece	World War I: The cargo ship was sunk in the Mediterranean Sea off Cape Matapan (35°38′N 22°36′E) by SM U-14 (Austro-Hungarian Navy).
Ocean Swell	United Kingdom	World War I: The barquentine was shelled and sunk in the English Channel 15 nautical miles (28 km) south east of Start Point, Devon by SM UB-31 (Imperial German Navy). Her crew survived.
SM UC-7	Imperial German Navy	World War I: The Type UC I submarine was last reported in the North Sea on this date. Believed to have subsequently struck a mine and sank in the North Sea north of Zeebrugge, West Flanders, Belgium with the loss of all eighteen crew.

== 6 July ==
List of shipwrecks: 6 July 1917
Ship	State	Description
AG-14	Imperial Russian Navy	World War I: The AG-class submarine was sunk off Libava, probably by a mine.
Cumberland	United Kingdom	World War I: The cargo ship struck a mine and sank in the Pacific Ocean 16 nautical miles (30 km) south west of Gabo Island, Victoria, Australia.
Flora	Norway	World War I: The passenger ship was sunk in the North Sea 12 nautical miles (22 km) north east of Lamba Ness, Shetland Islands, United Kingdom by SM U-52 (Imperial German Navy). All on board survived.
Handel en Visscherij	Netherlands	World War I: The fishing vessel was shelled and sunk in the North Sea (56°50′N 5°20′E) by SM UC-33 (Imperial German Navy). Her crew survived.
Indutiomare	Belgium	World War I: The cargo ship was torpedoed and sunk in the English Channel (50°34′N 01°24′W) by SM UC-61 (Imperial German Navy). Her crew survived.
HMS Itchen	Royal Navy	World War I: The E-class destroyer was torpedoed and sunk in the North Sea 70 nautical miles (130 km) north north east of Peterhead, Aberdeenshire (58°35′N 0°45′W) by SM UC-44 (Imperial German Navy) with the loss of eight of her 70 crew.
Løvstakken	Norway	World War I: The cargo ship was sunk in the Atlantic Ocean 40 nautical miles (74 km) north west of Ouessant, Finistère, France (48°00′N 5°43′W) by SM UC-71 (Imperial German Navy). Her crew survived.
Motor	Denmark	World War I: The auxiliary schooner was shelled and sunk in the North Sea off Utsira, Rogaland, Norway (59°22′N 2°45′E) by SM U-58 (Imperial German Navy). Her crew survived.
Piet Hein	Netherlands	World War I: The fishing vessel was shelled and sunk in the North Sea (56°50′N 5°20′E) by SM UC-33 (Imperial German Navy). Her crew survived.
Roma	Italy	World War I: The sailing vessel was sunk in the Strait of Sicily by SM U-65 (Imperial German Navy).
Skjald	Norway	World War I: The barque was scuttled in the North Sea (57°03′N 4°46′E) by SM UC-33 (Imperial German Navy). Her crew survived.
Victoria 2	Norway	World War I: The cargo ship was scuttled in the Atlantic Ocean 35 nautical miles (65 km) north of Ouessant by SM UC-71 (Imperial German Navy). Her crew survived.

== 7 July ==
List of shipwrecks: 7 July 1917
Ship	State	Description
Bellucia	United Kingdom	World War I: The cargo ship was torpedoed and damaged in the English Channel 2 nautical miles (3.7 km) south south east of The Lizard, Cornwall (49°58′N 5°11′W) by SM UB-31 (Imperial German Navy) with the loss of four of her crew. She was taken in tow but consequently sank.
Condesa	United Kingdom	World War I: The refrigerated cargo ship was torpedoed in the Atlantic Ocean 105 nautical miles (194 km) west of the Bishop Rock, Isles of Scilly (49°23′N 9°00′W) by SM U-84 (Imperial German Navy), a voyage from Montevideo to Falmouth. Her crew and passengers were rescued and landed at Falmouth. Although eventually taken in tow, she sank on 9 September, 30 nautical miles (56 km) from the Scillies.
Coral Leaf	United Kingdom	World War I: The sailing vessel was shelled and sunk in the Atlantic Ocean 18 nautical miles (33 km) north west by north of Tearaght Island, County Donegal by an Imperial German Navy submarine.
F4	Regia Marina	The F-class submarine sank without loss of life while in port at La Spezia, Italy, after her crew made a mistake that opened her torpedo room to the sea, resulting in uncontrollable flooding. She was refloated, repaired, and returned to service.
HMT Kelvin	Royal Navy	World War I: The naval trawler struck a mine and sank in the North Sea east of Aldeburgh, Suffolk (52°04′25″N 1°46′50″E) with the loss of five of her crew.
La Resolu	France	World War I: The sailing vessel was sunk in the Mediterranean Sea by SM U-38 (Imperial German Navy).
Massapequa	United States	World War I: The cargo ship was shelled and sunk in the Atlantic Ocean 200 nautical miles (370 km) west of Belle Île, Morbihan, France (46°40′N 9°00′W) by SM UC-72 (Imperial German Navy). Her crew survived.
Milano	Italy	World War I: The schooner was shelled and sunk in the Mediterranean Sea off Cape Sigli, Algeria (37°06′N 4°50′E) by SM UC-67 (Imperial German Navy).
Mt 11	Imperial Russian Navy	World War I: The minesweeping boat struck a mine and sank in the Baltic Sea off Rauma, Finland.
Mt 14	Imperial Russian Navy	World War I: The minesweeping boat struck a mine and sank in the Baltic Sea off Rauma.
Oxø	Norway	World War I: The barque was sunk in the Atlantic Ocean 90 nautical miles (170 km) west of the Isles of Scilly (49°32′N 8°17′W) by SM U-84 (Imperial German Navy). Her crew survived.
USS Saxis	United States Navy	The patrol vessel was wrecked at West Point, Virginia.
Shigizan Maru	Japan	World War I: The cargo ship struck a mine and sank in the Mediterranean Sea off Port-la-Nouvelle, Aude, France. Her crew survived.
HMT Southesk	Royal Navy	World War I: The naval trawler struck a mine and sank in Auskerry Sound (59°03′N 2°34′W) with the loss of four of her crew.
Southina	United Kingdom	World War I: The collier was torpedoed and sunk in the Mediterranean Sea 6 nautical miles (11 km) north north west of Cape Sigli (36°52′N 4°56′E) by SM UC-67 (Imperial German Navy) with the loss of a crew member.
Tarquah	United Kingdom	World War I: The passenger ship was torpedoed and sunk in the Atlantic Ocean 10 nautical miles (19 km) south west of the Bull Rock (51°29′N 10°25′W) by SM U-57 (Imperial German Navy). Her crew survived.
SM U-99	Imperial German Navy	World War I: The Type U 57 submarine was torpedoed and sunk in the North Sea (58°00′N 3°40′E) by HMS J2 (Royal Navy) with the loss of all 40 crew.
Wilberforce	United Kingdom	World War I: The cargo ship was torpedoed and sunk in the Mediterranean Sea 25 nautical miles (46 km) south of the Cabo de Gata, Spain (36°23′N 2°22′W) by SM U-34 (Imperial German Navy) with the loss of a crew member. Two crew were taken as prisoners of war.

== 8 July ==
List of shipwrecks: 8 July 1917
Ship	State	Description
Asheim	Norway	World War I: The four-masted barque was scuttled in the Atlantic Ocean 20 nautical miles (37 km) north west of Inishtrahull Island, County Donegal, United Kingdom (57°33′N 7°55′W) by SM U-53 (Imperial German Navy) with the loss of a crew member.
Atlantic	Norway	World War I: The barque was sunk in the Atlantic Ocean 20 nautical miles (37 km) south of St. Kilda, United Kingdom by SM U-53 (Imperial German Navy). Her crew survived.
Cambronne	France	World War I: The barque was scuttled in the Atlantic Ocean 200 nautical miles (370 km) off the Île de Sein, Finistère (47°34′N 7°30′W) by SM UC-72 (Imperial German Navy).
Fiorella	Norway	World War I: The barque was scuttled in the Norwegian Sea 40 nautical miles (74 km) east of the Faroe Islands by SM U-58 (Imperial German Navy). Her crew survived.
L'Immortale Leone	Italy	World War I: the brigantine was shelled and sunk in the Strait of Sicily (36°20′N 11°35′E) by SM U-65 (Imperial German Navy).
Manila	United States	World War I: The Schooner was captured and sunk by SMS Seeadler (Imperial German Navy) in the Pacific Ocean.
Mary W. Bowen	United States	World War I: The five-masted schooner was scuttled in the Atlantic Ocean west of Belle Île (47°20′N 8°10′W) by SM UC-72 (Imperial German Navy). Her crew survived.
M. I. Mandal	Denmark	World War I: The cargo ship was scuttled in the Atlantic Ocean 110 nautical miles (200 km) west of Ouessant, Finistère by SM UC-72 (Imperial German Navy). Her crew survived.
Obuasi	United Kingdom	World War I: The passenger ship was torpedoed and sunk in the Atlantic Ocean 290 nautical miles (540 km) north west by west of the Fastnet Rock by SM U-49 (Imperial German Navy) with the loss of two crew. Her captain was taken as a prisoner of war.
Pegu	United Kingdom	World War I: The cargo liner was torpedoed and sunk in the Atlantic Ocean 7 nautical miles (13 km)) south east of Galley Head, County Cork (51°28′N 8°39′W) by SM U-57 (Imperial German Navy) with the loss of a crew member.
Ruelle	France	World War I: The cargo ship was sunk in the Atlantic Ocean 200 nautical miles (370 km) north west of Madeira, Portugal (approximately 38°N 18°W) by SM U-155 (Imperial German Navy).
Spekulation	Sweden	World War I: The barque was shelled and sunk in the North Sea 50 nautical miles (93 km) south east of Hartlepool, County Durham, United Kingdom by SM UC-55 (Imperial German Navy). Her crew survived.
Valetta	United Kingdom	World War I: The cargo ship was torpedoed and sunk in the Atlantic Ocean 118 nautical miles (219 km) north west by west of the Fastnet Rock (51°49′N 12°22′W) by SM U-87 (Imperial German Navy). Her crew survived.
Vendee	United Kingdom	World War I: The cargo ship struck a mine and sank in the Bay of Biscay off the mouth of the Gironde (45°45′N 1°20′W with the loss of three of her crew.

== 9 July ==
List of shipwrecks: 9 July 1917
Ship	State	Description
Ceres	France	World War I: The brigantine was sunk in the Atlantic Ocean 130 nautical miles (240 km) west of Penmarc'h, Finistère (47°00′N 10°36′W) by SM UC-72 (Imperial German Navy).
Iparraguirre	Spain	World War I: The cargo ship was sunk in the Atlantic Ocean 40 nautical miles (74 km) north west of the Butt of Lewis, United Kingdom (59°08′N 6°10′W) by SM U-66 (Imperial German Navy) with the loss of a crew member.
Nyora	Australia	The steamship foundered in a storm 50 miles (80 km) west of Kingston, South Australia just after passing Kangaroo Island while towing the schooner Astoria. 14 people on board Nyora were killed, with 2 survivors. The vessel's wreck was found on 18 June 2019 off Café Jaffa, South Australia.
Prince Abbas	United Kingdom	World War I: The cargo ship was torpedoed and sunk in the North Sea 29 nautical miles (54 km) east of Fair Isle by SM U-52 (Imperial German Navy) with the loss of two crew.
HMS Vanguard	Royal Navy	The St. Vincent-class battleship exploded and sank at Scapa Flow, Orkney Isles with the loss of 804 of her 806 crew.

== 10 July ==
List of shipwrecks: 10 July 1917
Ship	State	Description
Cedric	United Kingdom	World War I: The trawler was scuttled in the Atlantic Ocean 55 nautical miles (102 km) south by west of Suðuroy, Faroe Islands by SM U-53 (Imperial German Navy). Her crew survived.
City of Washington	United States	The coal barge came ashore at Key Largo, Florida and was wrecked.
Flamma	United Kingdom	World War I: The cargo ship struck a mine and was damaged in the North Sea off Hartlepool, County Durham. She was beached but was later refloated.
Garmoyle	United Kingdom	World War I: The cargo ship was torpedoed and sunk in the Atlantic Ocean 14 nautical miles (26 km) south east of Mine Head, County Cork (51°49′N 6°52′W) by SM U-57 (Imperial German Navy) with the loss of twenty crew.
Hildegard	United States	World War I: The barquentine was scuttled in the English Channel 10 nautical miles (19 km) south east of Start Point, Devon, United Kingdom by SM UB-31 (Imperial German Navy). Her crew survived.
Jupiter	France	World War I: The trawler struck a mine and sank in the English Channel with the loss of eleven of her crew.
Kansan	United States	World War I: The cargo ship struck a mine and sank in the Bay of Biscay 2 nautical miles (3.7 km) east of Kerdonis Point, Belle Île, Morbihan, France (47°20′N 3°03′W) with the loss of four of her crew, or six wounded. Refloated in 1928 and scrapped.
King David	United Kingdom	World War I: The cargo ship was shelled and sunk in the Atlantic Ocean 360 nautical miles (670 km) north west of the Fastnet Rock by SM U-49 (Imperial German Navy) with the loss of two crew.
Mabel	United Kingdom	World War I: The trawler was scuttled in the Atlantic Ocean off Suðuroy by SM U-53 (Imperial German Navy). Her crew survived.
Pacific	United Kingdom	World War I: The trawler was scuttled in the Atlantic Ocean off Suðuroy by SM U-53 (Imperial German Navy). Her crew survived.
Peridot	United Kingdom	World War I: The trawler was scuttled in the Atlantic Ocean off Suðuroy by SM U-53 (Imperial German Navy). Her crew survived.
Pretoria	United Kingdom	World War I: The trawler was shelled and sunk in the Atlantic Ocean 130 nautical miles (240 km) north by west of Hoy Head, Shetland Islands by SM U-53 (Imperial German Navy). Her crew survived.
Romantic	United Kingdom	World War I: The trawler was scuttled in the Atlantic Ocean off Suðuroy by SM U-53 (Imperial German Navy). Her crew survived.
Sea King	United Kingdom	World War I: The trawler was scuttled in the Atlantic Ocean 60 nautical miles (110 km) south by east of Suðuroy by SM U-53 (Imperial German Navy). Her crew survived.
Seang Choon	United Kingdom	World War I: The passenger ship was torpedoed and sunk in the Atlantic Ocean 10 nautical miles (19 km) south west of the Fastnet Rock by SM U-87 (Imperial German Navy) with the loss of nineteen lives.
Stoic	United Kingdom	World War I: The 115.2-foot (35.1 m), 200-ton steam trawler was shelled and sunk in the Atlantic Ocean 55 miles south west of the south point of Suderö, Faroe Islands by SM U-53 (Imperial German Navy). Her crew survived.
HMT Vale of Leven	Royal Navy	World War I:The 115.2-foot (35.1 m), 223-ton steam minesweeping naval trawler was sunk by a mine in the North Sea.
Yâdigâr-ı-Millet (aka Jadhigar-i-Millet)	Ottoman Navy	World War I: The S165-class destroyer was bombed and sunk at İstinye, Turkey in the Bosphorus (39°56′00″N 29°10′30″E) by a Royal Naval Air Service Handley Page aircraft with the loss of 26 of her crew. She was refloated on 24 October 1917.

== 11 July ==
List of shipwrecks: 11 July 1917
Ship	State	Description
Anglo-Patagonian	United Kingdom	World War I: The cargo ship was torpedoed and sunk in the Bay of Biscay 20 nautical miles (37 km) west south west of Sables d'Olonne, Vendée, France (46°26′N 2°10′W) by SM UC-72 (Imperial German Navy) with the loss of four of her crew.
Beluga	United States	World War I: The steam schooner whaler was scuttled by shelling after being captured on 9 July off Lord Howe Island in the Pacific Ocean by SMS Wolf (Imperial German Navy).
Brunhilda	United Kingdom	World War I: The cargo ship was torpedoed and sunk in the English Channel 7 nautical miles (13 km) south east of Start Point, Devon by SM UB-31 (Imperial German Navy). Her crew survived.
Croxteth Hall	United Kingdom	World War I: The steamer struck a mine and sank 25 miles (40 km) west of Bombay, India.
Kioto	United Kingdom	World War I: The cargo ship was torpedoed and sunk in the Atlantic Ocean 20 nautical miles (37 km) south west of the Fastnet Rock (51°07′N 9°51′W) by SM U-87 (Imperial German Navy). Her crew survived.
Leata	Australia	The sailing vessel was lost off Mary Ann Point, West Australia.
Siracusa	Italy	World War I: The cargo ship struck a mine and sank in the Mediterranean Sea.
SM U-69	Imperial German Navy	The Type U 66 submarine reported that she was off the coast of Norway. The British claimed that she was depth charged and sank on 12 July by HMS Patriot (Royal Navy but post-war evaluation casts doubt that U-69 was the victim. Lost with all 40 crew.
Vanda	Sweden	World War I: The cargo ship was torpedoed and sunk in the North Sea with the loss of one crew whilst in convoy from Lerwick, at (60°15′N 1°20′E) by SM U-52 (Imperial German Navy).
Vordingborg	Denmark	World War I: The cargo ship was scuttled in the English Channel 25 nautical miles (46 km) north east of Ouessant, Finistère (48°52′N 5°16′W) by SM UC-77 (Imperial German Navy). Her crew survived.

== 12 July ==
List of shipwrecks: 12 July 1917
Ship	State	Description
Balzac	Norway	World War I: The cargo ship was torpedoed and, sunk in the North Sea off Lerwick, Shetland Islands, United Kingdom (58°50′N 0°46′W) by SM UC-55 (Imperial German Navy). Her crew survived.
Calliope	United Kingdom	World War I: The collier was sunk in the Atlantic Ocean 150 nautical miles (280 km) north of Madeira, Portugal by SM U-155 (Imperial German Navy) with the loss of all 27 crew.
Castleton	United Kingdom	World War I: The cargo ship was shelled and sunk in the Atlantic Ocean 60 nautical miles (110 km) south south west of the Bishop Rock, Isles of Scilly by SM U-87 (Imperial German Navy). Her crew survived.
Claire	Belgium	World War I: The cargo ship was torpedoed and sunk in the Mediterranean Sea 250 nautical miles (460 km) north east of Bône, Algeria (40°01′N 06°05′E) by SM U-38 (Imperial German Navy) with the loss of 26 crew.
Francesco	Italy	World War I: The brigantine was scuttled in the Mediterranean Sea 10 nautical miles (19 km) west of Marsala, Sicily (37°31′N 12°18′E) by SM UC-67 (Imperial German Navy).
Fredrika	Sweden	World War I: The cargo ship was torpedoed and damaged in the North Sea whilst in convoy 50 nautical miles (93 km) off the Orkney Islands, United Kingdom (59°08′N 0°54′E) by SM U-52 (Imperial German Navy). She was subsequently taken in tow but foundered 9 nautical miles (17 km) east of Auskerry.
HMT George Milburn	Royal Navy	World War I: The naval trawler struck a mine and sank in the Irish Sea 1.5 nautical miles (2.8 km) south of Dunmore Point, County Waterford with the loss of eleven of her crew.
Grace	United States	World War I: The cargo ship was sunk in the Aegean Sea 5 nautical miles (9.3 km) north of Cape Phessos, Andros, Greece (38°11′N 24°41′E) by SM UC-38 (Imperial German Navy) with the loss of three of her crew.
Lai	Norway	World War I: The auxiliary schooner was sunk in the North Sea 40 nautical miles (74 km) west of Egersund, Rogaland by SM UC-55 (Imperial German Navy). Her crew survived.
Leonardo G.	Italy	World War I: The vessel was sunk in the Mediterranean Sea 10 nautical miles (19 km) west of Marsala by SM UC-67 (Imperial German Navy).
Maija	Russia	World War I: The schooner was sunk in the Atlantic Ocean off the coast of Portugal by SM UC-54 (Imperial German Navy).
Muirfield	United Kingdom	World War I: The cargo ship was torpedoed and sunk in the Atlantic Ocean 350 nautical miles (650 km) north west of the Fastnet Rock by SM U-49 (Imperial German Navy) with the loss of two crew. Two survivors were taken as prisoners of war.
Ondine	France	World War I: The schooner was scuttled in the Mediterranean Sea 5 nautical miles (9.3 km) north of Denia, Spain by SM U-34 (Imperial German Navy). All six crew survived.

== 13 July ==
List of shipwrecks: 13 July 1917
Ship	State	Description
Afram	Denmark	World War I: The sailing vessel was sunk in the North Sea 90 to 100 nautical miles (170 to 190 km) east of Girdle Ness, Aberdeenshire, United Kingdom by SM UC-45 (Imperial German Navy).
Ascain	France	World War I: The cargo ship was torpedoed and sunk in the Atlantic Ocean 11 nautical miles (20 km) north of the Stiff Lighthouse, Ouessant, Finistère by SM UC-77 (Imperial German Navy).
Charialos Tricoupis	Greece	World War I: The cargo ship was sunk in the Atlantic Ocean off Bantry, County Cork, United Kingdom (52°25′N 12°54′W) by SM U-58 (Imperial German Navy).
Ceres	Denmark	World War I: The cargo ship was sunk in the Atlantic Ocean off Inistrahull Island, County Donegal, United Kingdom (56°00′N 12°00′W) by SM U-88 (Imperial German Navy) with the loss of two of her crew.
Gibel-Yedid	United Kingdom	World War I: The coaster was scuttled in the Atlantic Ocean 150 nautical miles (280 km) west of Ouessant by SM U-48 (Imperial German Navy). Her crew survived.
Loanda	Portugal	World War I: The schooner was shelled and sunk in the Atlantic Ocean 50 nautical miles (93 km) off Cape Roca by SM UC-54 (Imperial German Navy).

== 14 July ==
List of shipwrecks: 14 July 1917
Ship	State	Description
Bonus	Finland	World War I: The vessel was sunk in the Baltic Sea off Mäntyluoto by SM UC-58 (Imperial German Navy).
Chalkydon	Greece	World War I: The cargo ship was sunk in the Atlantic Ocean 600 nautical miles (1,100 km) west of Gibraltar (34°10′N 17°25′W) by SM U-155 (Imperial German Navy). Her crew survived.
Emanuel	Denmark	World War I: The schooner was sunk in the Atlantic Ocean west of the Orkney Islands, United Kingdom (59°35′N 6°00′W) by SM U-96 (Imperial German Navy). Her crew survived; they were rescued by HMS G12 (Royal Navy).
Exford	United Kingdom	World War I: The cargo ship was torpedoed and sunk in the Atlantic Ocean 180 nautical miles (330 km) west by south of Ouessant, Finistère, France (46°48′N 8°50′W) by SM U-48 (Imperial German Navy) with the loss of six crew.

== 15 July ==
List of shipwrecks: 15 July 1917
Ship	State	Description
Atalante	France	World War I: The barque was sunk in the Mediterranean Sea south east of the Balearic Islands, Spain by SM U-38 (Imperial German Navy).
Dinorwic	United Kingdom	World War I: The three-masted schooner was scuttled in the English Channel 10 nautical miles (19 km) south by east of Hastings, Sussex by SM UB-40 (Imperial German Navy). Her crew survived.
Dudhope	United Kingdom	World War I: The full-rigged ship was scuttled in the Atlantic Ocean 200 nautical miles (370 km) west of the Fastnet Rock by SM U-49 (Imperial German Navy). Her crew survived.
Ebenezer	United Kingdom	World War I: The brig was scuttled in the English Channel 25 nautical miles (46 km) north west of Dieppe, Seine-Inférieure, France by SM UB-40 (Imperial German Navy). Her crew survived.
Encore	United States	World War I: The barque was captured and burned in the Coral Sea by SMS Wolf (Imperial German Navy).
Margaretha Blumenthal	Germany	Margaretha Blumenthal The cargo ship was driven ashore at Zandvoort, North Holland, Netherlands.
Mariston	United Kingdom	World War I: The cargo ship was torpedoed and sunk in the Atlantic Ocean 82 nautical miles (152 km) west of the Fastnet Rock (50°52′N 11°38′W) by SM U-45 (Imperial German Navy) with the loss of 28 crew.
HMS Redbreast	Royal Navy	World War I: The fleet messenger was sunk in the Aegean Sea by SM UC-38 (Imperial German Navy) with the loss of 44 lives. One of the survivors was taken as a prisoner of war.
Torcello	United Kingdom	World War I: The cargo ship was torpedoed and sunk in the Atlantic Ocean 160 nautical miles (300 km) south west by west of the Bishop Rock, Isles of Scilly by SM U-48 (Imperial German Navy) with the loss of a crew member.
Trelissick	United Kingdom	World War I: The cargo ship was torpedoed and sunk in the Atlantic Ocean 80 nautical miles (150 km) south west by west of Ouessant, Finistère, France (47°28′N 6°28′W) by SM UC-72 (Imperial German Navy). Her crew survived, but three of them were taken as prisoners of war.

== 16 July ==
List of shipwrecks: 16 July 1917
Ship	State	Description
HMT Asama	Royal Navy	World War I: The trawler, operating as a Q-ship, was shelled and sunk in the Atlantic Ocean 190 nautical miles (350 km) due west of Lundy Island, Devon by SM U-48 (Imperial German Navy) with the loss of a crew member.
Cyrus	Russia	World War I: The three-masted schooner was torpedoed and sunk in the Atlantic Ocean west of the Hebrides, United Kingdom (57°53′N 10°35′W) by SM U-30 (Imperial German Navy).
Firfield	United Kingdom	World War I: The cargo ship was torpedoed and sunk in the Gulf of Patras 10 nautical miles (19 km) north west of Cape Pappas, Greece (37°42′N 25°47′E) by SM UC-38 (Imperial German Navy). Her crew survived.
Henry R. James	United Kingdom	World War I: The cargo ship was sunk in the Atlantic Ocean 10 nautical miles (19 km) east by north of the Île de Batz, Finistère, France (48°49′N 3°46′W) by SM UC-48 (Imperial German Navy) with the loss of 24 of her crew.
Khephren	United Kingdom	World War I: The cargo ship was torpedoed and sunk in the Mediterranean Sea 178 nautical miles (330 km) east of Malta (36°15′N 18°00′E) by SM U-32 (Imperial German Navy). Her crew was rescued by her escorts HMT Mary Wetherly and HMT Drypool both (Royal Navy).
Lamia L.	Italy	World War I: The cargo ship was sunk in the Atlantic Ocean south west of Ireland by SM U-49 and SM U-58 (both Imperial German Navy). Her crew survived.
Oregon	Canada	The 46-ton schooner was wrecked off Whitehead, Nova Scotia.
Porto di Adalia	Italy	World War I: The cargo ship was sunk in the Mediterranean Sea 150 nautical miles (280 km) east of Malta (34°40′N 18°40′E) by SM U-32 (Imperial German Navy).
Ribston	United Kingdom	World War I: The cargo ship was torpedoed and sunk in the Atlantic Ocean 85 nautical miles (157 km) west of the Fastnet Rock (50°52′N 11°38′W) by SM U-45 (Imperial German Navy) with the loss of 25 crew.
Tamele	United Kingdom	World War I: The cargo ship was torpedoed and sunk in the Atlantic Ocean 65 nautical miles (120 km) west by south of the Fastnet Rock by SM U-87 (Imperial German Navy) with the loss of a crew member.
Timor	Netherlands	World War I: The coaster was scuttled in the North Sea 18 nautical miles (33 km) south of the Noord Hinder Lightship (Netherlands) by SM UC-64 (Imperial German Navy).
Valentia	United Kingdom	World War I: The collier was torpedoed and sunk in the Atlantic Ocean 70 nautical miles (130 km) west by south of the Bishop Rock, Isles of Scilly by SM UC-41 (Imperial German Navy) with the loss of three of her crew.
Vesta	Denmark	World War I: The cargo ship was torpedoed and sunk in the Atlantic Ocean north of Scotland by SM U-88 (Imperial German Navy) with the loss of five of her crew.

== 17 July ==
List of shipwrecks: 17 July 1917
Ship	State	Description
HMS C34	Royal Navy	World War I: The C-class submarine was sunk off the Shetland Islands (59°51′N 1°05′W) by SM U-52 (Imperial German Navy) with the loss of eighteen of her nineteen crew. The survivor was rescued by U-52.
Coquimbo	France	World War I: The full-rigged ship struck a mine and sank in the Bay of Biscay off La Rochelle, Loire-Inférieure with the loss of seven of her crew.
Haworth	United Kingdom	World War I: The cargo ship was torpedoed and sunk in the Atlantic Ocean 94 nautical miles (174 km) west of the Fastnet Rock (50°47′N 11°55′W) by SM U-45 (Imperial German Navy). Her crew survived.
HMS Newmarket	Royal Navy	World War I: The auxiliary minesweeper) was torpedoed and sunk in the Aegean Sea south of Icaria, Greece (37°17′N 26°15′E) by SM UC-38 (Imperial German Navy) with the loss of 44 of her crew. Three of the survivors were taken as prisoners of war.
Virent	United Kingdom	World War I: The cargo ship was torpedoed and damaged in the Mediterranean Sea (35°40′N 14°45′E) by SM U-32 (Imperial German Navy). She was beached but was refloated on 19 July. Subsequently repaired and returned to service.

== 18 July ==
List of shipwrecks: 18 July 1917
Ship	State	Description
HMT Betsy Sim	Royal Navy	The naval trawler was lost on this date.
Ellen	Norway	World War I: The cargo ship was scuttled in the Atlantic Ocean (36°40′N 23°40′W)) by SM U-155 (Imperial German Navy). Her crew survived.

== 19 July ==
List of shipwrecks: 19 July 1917
Ship	State	Description
Artensis	Norway	World War I: The full-rigged ship was scuttled in the Atlantic Ocean west of Ireland 54°32′N 11°07′W) by SM U-87 (Imperial German Navy). Her crew survived.
Clan McLachlan	United Kingdom	The collier collided with Europa (Italy) and sank in the Atlantic Ocean 60 nautical miles (110 km) south west of Cape Spartel, Morocco with the loss of six of her crew.
Eloby	United Kingdom	World War I: The troopship was torpedoed and sunk in the Mediterranean Sea 75 nautical miles (139 km) south east by east of Malta (35°11′N 15°38′E) by SM U-38 (Imperial German Navy) with the loss of over 156 lives.
Harrildsborg	Denmark	World War I: The cargo ship was torpedoed and sunk in the North Sea 24 nautical miles (44 km) west of Holmengrå, Hordaland, Norway (60°47′N 4°09′E) by SM U-67 (Imperial German Navy). Her crew survived and were rescued by HMS Arab (Royal Navy).
Varvara	Greece	World War I: The cargo ship was shelled and sunk in the Mediterranean Sea off Cape Spartivento, Calabria by SM U-32 (Imperial German Navy).

== 20 July ==
List of shipwrecks: 20 July 1917
Ship	State	Description
Beatrice	United Kingdom	World War I: The coaster was torpedoed and sunk in the English Channel 10 nautical miles (19 km) east by south of The Lizard, Cornwall (49°57′N 4°57′W) by SM UC-47 (Imperial German Navy) with the loss of eleven of her crew.
Bramham	United Kingdom	World War I: The cargo ship struck a mine and sank in the English Channel 10 nautical miles (19 km) east by south of The Lizard (50°01′N 4°56′W) with the loss of a crew member.
City of Florence	United Kingdom	World War I: The cargo ship was torpedoed and sunk in the Atlantic Ocean 188 nautical miles (348 km) west by north of Ouessant, Finistère, France (47°45′N 9°45′W) by SM UC-17 (Imperial German Navy). Her crew survived.
Fluent	United Kingdom	World War I: The cargo ship was torpedoed and sunk in the English Channel 15 nautical miles (28 km) south west of Portland Bill, Dorset (50°26′N 1°52′W) by SM UC-65 (Imperial German Navy). Her crew survived.
Hanseat	Norway	World War I: The cargo ship was sunk in the Atlantic Ocean 105 nautical miles (194 km) south east by south of Santa Maria Island, Azores, Portugal (36°00′N 23°12′W) by SM U-155 (Imperial German Navy). Her crew survived.
Kageshima Maru	Japan	World War I: The cargo ship was sunk in the Atlantic Ocean 90 nautical miles (170 km) west of Ouessant (47°29′N 6°20′W) by SM UC-69 (Imperial German Navy).
L. H. Carl	United Kingdom	World War I: The cargo ship was torpedoed and sunk in the English Channel 14 nautical miles (26 km) west of Portland Bill (50°26′N 2°48′W) by SM UB-40 (Imperial German Navy) with the loss of two of her crew.
Nevisbrook	United Kingdom	World War I: The cargo ship was torpedoed and sunk in the Atlantic Ocean 90 nautical miles (170 km) west of the Fastnet Rock by SM U-45 (Imperial German Navy). Her crew survived.
HMS Queen of the North	Royal Navy	World War I: The auxiliary minesweeper struck a mine and sank in the North Sea north east of the Shipwash Lightship (United Kingdom) (52°03′15″N 1°49′39″E) with the loss of 29 of her crew.
HMT Robert Smith	Royal Navy	The naval trawler was lost in the Atlantic Ocean on this date.
RMS Salsette	United Kingdom	World War I: The passenger ship was torpedoed and sunk in the English Channel 15 nautical miles (28 km) south west of Portland Bill by SM UB-40 (Imperial German Navy) with the loss of fifteen lives.

== 21 July ==
List of shipwrecks: 21 July 1917
Ship	State	Description
African Prince	United Kingdom	World War I: The cargo ship was torpedoed and sunk in the Atlantic Ocean 60 nautical miles (110 km) north north west of Tory Island, County Donegal (56°00′N 9°30′W) by SM U-66 (Imperial German Navy). Her crew survived.
Augustus Welt	United States	World War I: The four-masted schooner was captured and scuttled in the Atlantic Ocean 130 nautical miles (240 km) south west of Ouessant, Finistère, France by SM UC-17 (Imperial German Navy). Her crew survived.
Coniston Water	United Kingdom	World War I: The cargo ship was torpedoed and sunk in the Atlantic Ocean 70 nautical miles (130 km) north by west of the Butt of Lewis (59°29′N 7°36′W) by SM U-87 (Imperial German Navy). Her crew survived, but one of them was taken as a prisoner of war.
Dafila	United Kingdom	World War I: The cargo ship was torpedoed and sunk in the Atlantic Ocean 85 nautical miles (157 km) west by south of the Fastnet Rock by SM U-45 (Imperial German Navy) with the loss of two crew.
Doris	Italy	World War I: The cargo ship was scuttled in the Atlantic Ocean 90 nautical miles (170 km) south west of Santa Maria Island, Azores, Portugal by SM U-155 (Imperial German Navy).
Harold	United Kingdom	World War I: The barque was torpedoed and sunk in the Atlantic Ocean 65 nautical miles (120 km) north north west of Tory Island by SM U-66 (Imperial German Navy) with the loss of thirteen crew.
John Twohy	United States	World War I: The four-masted schooner was captured and scuttled in the Atlantic Ocean 120 nautical miles (220 km) south of the Azores by SM U-155 (Imperial German Navy). Her crew survived.
Paddington	United Kingdom	World War I: The cargo liner was torpedoed and sunk in the Atlantic Ocean 250 nautical miles (460 km) west of the Fastnet Rock (49°47′N 15°40′W) by SM U-96 (Imperial German Navy) with the loss of 29 lives.
Ramilles	United Kingdom	World War I: The cargo ship was shelled and sunk in the Atlantic Ocean 120 nautical miles (220 km) west north west of Tory Island (55°24′N 11°08′W) by SM U-58 (Imperial German Navy). Her crew survived, but her captain was taken as a prisoner of war.
HMT Robert Smith	Royal Navy	World War I: The naval trawler was shelled and sunk in the Atlantic Ocean by SM U-44 (Imperial German Navy) with the loss of all 25 crew. Her last known position was 59°14′N 9°40′W.
Trelyon	United Kingdom	World War I: The cargo ship struck a mine in the North Sea 3 nautical miles (5.6 km) north of Scarborough, Yorkshire (54°18′N 0°20′W). She was beached but was a total loss.
Willena Gertrude	United Kingdom	World War I: The schooner was scuttled in the Atlantic Ocean 120 nautical miles (220 km) south by east of Santa Maria Island, Azores (35°25′N 23°26′W) by SM U-155 (Imperial German Navy). Her crew survived.

== 22 July ==
List of shipwrecks: 22 July 1917
Ship	State	Description
Breda	Netherlands	World War I: The coaster was torpedoed and damaged in the North Sea 7 nautical miles (13 km) west of the Noord Hinder Lightship (Netherlands) by SM UB-35 (Imperial German Navy). She was then shelled and sunk 8 nautical miles (15 km) south west of the Noord Hinder Lightship by SM UB-18 (Imperial German Navy).
Cotovia	United Kingdom	World War I: The cargo ship struck a mine and sank in the North Sea 2 nautical miles (3.7 km) south east by east of Auskerry, Orkney Islands (59°01′N 2°37′W). Her crew survived.
Dafila	United Kingdom	World War I: The cargo ship was sunk by a U-boat. Twenty six survivors rescued by USS Jacob Jones (United States Navy).
Glow	United Kingdom	World War I: The cargo ship was torpedoed and sunk in the North Sea off Robin Hood's Bay, Yorkshire (54°23′N 0°23′W) by SM UB-21 (Imperial German Navy) with the loss of a crew member.
Nereus	Netherlands	World War I: The sailing vessel was scuttled in the North Sea 10 nautical miles (19 km) south by east of the Noord Hinder Lightship (Netherlands) by SM UB-18 (Imperial German Navy).
HMT Orphesia	Royal Navy	The 130-foot (40 m) 273-ton minesweeping naval trawler struck a submerged wreck and sank in the Mediterranean Sea off Alexandria, Egypt.
Rota	United Kingdom	World War I: The cargo ship was torpedoed and sunk in the English Channel 7 nautical miles (13 km) east by south of Berry Head, Devon by SM UB-40 (Imperial German Navy) with the loss of five of her crew.

== 23 July ==
List of shipwrecks: 23 July 1917
Ship	State	Description
Ashleigh	United Kingdom	World War I: The cargo ship was torpedoed and sunk in the Atlantic Ocean 290 nautical miles (540 km) south west of the Fastnet Rock by SM U-54 (Imperial German Navy). Her crew survived.
Frithjof	Norway	World War I: The cargo ship was sunk in the Atlantic Ocean off Cape Prior, Spain (43°39′N 2°10′W) by SM UC-69 (Imperial German Navy). Her crew survived.
Huelva	United Kingdom	World War I: The collier was torpedoed and sunk in the Atlantic Ocean 270 nautical miles (500 km) south west of the Fastnet Rock by SM U-54 (Imperial German Navy). Her crew survived.
HMML 474	Royal Navy	The motor launch was lost in the Mediterranean Sea on this date.
HMS Otway	Royal Navy	World War I: The armed merchant cruiser was torpedoed and sunk in the Atlantic Ocean north of the Butt of Lewis, Outer Hebrides (58°54′N 6°28′W), by the submarine SM UC-49 (Imperial German Navy) with the loss of ten of her crew.
Vanland	Sweden	World War I: The cargo ship was damaged by shelling in the North Sea off Whitby, Yorkshire, United Kingdom by SM UB-21 (Imperial German Navy). She was beached, but attacked again from the u-boat, this time with a torpedo. Broke in half and was a total loss.

== 24 July ==
List of shipwrecks: 24 July 1917
Ship	State	Description
Blake	United Kingdom	World War I: The cargo ship was torpedoed and sunk in the Atlantic Ocean 30 nautical miles (56 km) north west of Cape Wrath, Sutherland by SM UC-49 (Imperial German Navy) with the loss of five of her crew.
Brumaire	United Kingdom	World War I: The cargo ship was torpedoed and sunk in the Atlantic Ocean 265 nautical miles (491 km) west by north of Ouessant, Finistère, France (48°20′N 11°41′W) by SM U-46 (Imperial German Navy) with the loss of two crew.
Mikelis	Greece	The cargo ship sank in the Atlantic Ocean (54°20′N 5°06′W).
Montevideo 488	Uruguay	World War I: The floating crane was sunk in the North Sea 30 nautical miles (56 km) off the Nieuwe Waterweg, Netherlands (51°50′N 3°03′E) by SM UB-18 (Imperial German Navy).
Oostzee	Netherlands	World War I: The tug was sunk in the North Sea 30 nautical miles (56 km) off the Nieuwe Waterweg (51°50′N 3°03′E) by SM UB-18 (Imperial German Navy).
Sir Walter	United Kingdom	World War I: The coaster was scuttled in the Atlantic Ocean (43°46′N 7°50′W) by SM UC-69 (Imperial German Navy). All on board survived.
Thorsdal	Norway	World War I: The cargo ship was sunk in the Atlantic Ocean west of Scotland (55°35′N 13°38′W) by SM U-44 (Imperial German Navy). Her crew survived.
Viking	Sweden	World War I: The cargo ship was torpedoed and sunk with the loss of one life in the North Sea 15 nautical miles (28 km) off Sognefjord, Norway by SM U-67 (Imperial German Navy).
Zateja	Russia	World War I: The sailing vessel was sunk in the Atlantic Ocean west of the Hebrides, Scotland by SM U-45 (Imperial German Navy).
Zermatt	United Kingdom	World War I: The cargo ship was torpedoed and sunk in the Atlantic Ocean 355 nautical miles (657 km) west by north of Ouessant (47°40′N 13°38′W) by SM U-46 (Imperial German Navy with the loss of three crew.

== 25 July ==
List of shipwrecks: 25 July 1917
Ship	State	Description
Baldwin	Norway	World War I: The cargo ship was sunk in the Atlantic Ocean off Cabo Toriñana, Spain (43°05′N 9°19′W) by SM UC-69 (Imperial German Navy). Her crew survived.
Dea	Norway	World War I: The barque was scuttled in the Atlantic Ocean (60°20′N 4°01′W) by SM UC-49 (Imperial German Navy). Her crew survived.
Janna	Netherlands	World War I: The sailing vessel was scuttled in the North Sea 20 nautical miles (37 km) off the Nieuwe Waterweg by SM UB-18 (Imperial German Navy). She was later salvaged, repaired and returned to service.
Monkstone	United Kingdom	World War I: The collier was torpedoed and sunk in the Atlantic Ocean 240 nautical miles (440 km) west of the Isles of Scilly by SM U-82 (Imperial German Navy) with the loss of a crew member.
RFA Oakleaf	Royal Navy	World War I: The tanker was torpedoed and sunk in the Atlantic Ocean 64 nautical miles (119 km) off the Butt of Lewis (59°01′N 7°26′W) by SM UC-41 (Imperial German Navy). Her crew survived.
Otowa	Imperial Japanese Navy	The Otowa-class protected cruiser ran aground off Daiō, Mie (34°14′N 136°35′E). She sank on 10 August.
Peninsula	United Kingdom	World War I: The cargo ship was torpedoed and sunk in the Atlantic Ocean 235 nautical miles (435 km) south west of the Fastnet Rock (48°00′N 11°10′W) by SM U-46 (Imperial German Navy) with the loss of a crew member.
Purley	United Kingdom	World War I: The collier was torpedoed and sunk in the Atlantic Ocean 210 nautical miles (390 km) south west of the Fastnet Rock (48°08′N 11°35′W) by SM U-46 (Imperial German Navy). Her crew survived.
Rustington	United Kingdom	World War I: The cargo ship was torpedoed and sunk in the Atlantic Ocean 235 nautical miles (435 km) west by south of Ouessant, Finistère, France by SM U-54 (Imperial German Navy). Her crew survived.
Spes Mea	Netherlands	World War I: The sailing vessel was sunk in the North Sea off the Noord Hinder Lightship (Netherlands) by SM UB-18 (Imperial German Navy).
Vaarbud	Norway	World War I: The barque was scuttled in the Atlantic Ocean 40 nautical miles (74 km) west north west of Ouessant by SM UC-62 (Imperial German Navy). Her crew survived.

== 26 July ==
List of shipwrecks: 26 July 1917
Ship	State	Description
HMS Ariadne	Royal Navy	World War I: The Diadem-class cruiser was torpedoed and sunk in the English Channel off Beachy Head, Sussex by SM UC-65 (Imperial German Navy) with the loss of 38 of her crew.
Bertha	Portugal	World War I: The schooner was sunk in the Atlantic Ocean off Villa do Conde, Norte (41°20′N 8°58′W) by SM UC-69 (Imperial German Navy).
Blanchette	Italy	World War I: The schooner was captured and sunk in the Mediterranean Sea off Cape Corse, Corsica, France (42°57′N 9°43′E by SM U-33 (Imperial German Navy).
Carmarthen	United Kingdom	World War I: The cargo ship was torpedoed and damaged in the English Channel 2 nautical miles (3.7 km) south east of The Lizard, Cornwall (49°57′N 5°08′W) by SM UC-50 (Imperial German Navy). She was taken under tow but sank at 50°00′N 5°07′W). Her crew survived.
Gesu E Maria	Italy	World War I: The sailing vessel was sunk in the Mediterranean sea north of Cape Corse by SM U-33 (Imperial German Navy).
Locksley	Norway	World War I: The cargos ship was sunk in the Atlantic Ocean off Villa do Conde (41°23′N 8°51′W by SM UC-69 (Imperial German Navy). Her crew survived.
Ludgate	United Kingdom	World War I: The cargo ship struck a mine and sank in the Atlantic Ocean 2 nautical miles (3.7 km) south of Galley Head, County Cork with the loss of 24 of her crew.
Mooltan	United Kingdom	World War I: The passenger ship was torpedoed and sunk in the Mediterranean Sea 53 nautical miles (98 km) north north west of Cape Serrat, Tunisia by SM UC-27 (Imperial German Navy) with the loss of two lives.
Roberto Ivens	Portuguese Navy	World War I: The naval trawler struck a mine and sank in the Atlantic Ocean north of Cape Espichel with the loss of fourteen of her crew.
Somerset	United Kingdom	World War I: The refrigerated cargo liner was torpedoed and sunk in the Atlantic Ocean 230 nautical miles (430 km) west by south of Ouessant, Finistère, France by SM U-54 (Imperial German Navy). Her crew survived.
SM UB-23	Imperial German Navy	World War I: The Type UB II submarine was depth charged and severely damaged in the English Channel off The Lizard by HMS PC-60 (Royal Navy). She put into A Coruña, Spain where she was interned.
SM UC-61	Imperial German Navy	SM UC-61, December 2018 World War I: The Type UC II submarine ran aground at Wissant, Pas-de-Calais, France (50°53′N 1°33′E) and was scuttled.
Venturoso	Portugal	World War I: The barquentine was sunk in the Atlantic Ocean off Villa do Conde (41°21′N 8°58′W) by SM UC-69 (Imperial German Navy).

== 27 July ==
List of shipwrecks: 27 July 1917
Ship	State	Description
Batavier II	Germany	World War I: The passenger ship was shelled and sunk in the North Sea 1 mile (1.6 km) north of the Molengat Buoy, off Texel, North Holland by HMS E55 (Royal Navy).
Begona No.4	United Kingdom	World War I: The cargo ship was torpedoed and sunk in the Atlantic Ocean 70 nautical miles (130 km) west by north of the Fastnet Rock (51°15′N 11°45′W) by SM U-46 (Imperial German Navy) with the loss of two crew.
Bellagio	United Kingdom	World War I: The cargo ship was torpedoed and damaged in the English Channel 4 nautical miles (7.4 km) south of the Owers Lightship (United Kingdom) by SM UC-65 (Imperial German Navy). She was beached but was later refloated.
Belle of England	United Kingdom	World War I: The cargo ship was torpedoed and sunk in the Atlantic Ocean 155 nautical miles (287 km) west north west of the Fastnet Rock (53°54′N 15°15′W) by SM U-95 (Imperial German Navy). Her crew survived.
Candia	United Kingdom	World War I: The passenger ship was torpedoed and sunk in the English Channel 8 nautical miles (15 km; 9.2 mi) south of the Owers Lightship (United Kingdom) (50°32′N 0°26′W) by SM UC-65 (Imperial German Navy) with the loss of a crew member.
Carmela	United States	World War I: The auxiliary schooner was scuttled in the Atlantic Ocean 25 nautical miles (46 km) south west of The Lizard, Cornwall, United Kingdom (49°38′N 5°37′W) by SM UC-62 (Imperial German Navy). Her crew of 20 survived and were picked up by HMS Attack on the same day .
Dirk	Netherlands	World War I: The fishing vessel was sunk in the North Sea 19 nautical miles (35 km) off Zandvoort, North Holland by SM UC-16 (Imperial German Navy). Her crew survived.
Dirk van Duyne	Netherlands	World War I: The fishing vessel was sunk in the North Sea 19 nautical miles (35 km) west north west of IJmuiden, North Holland by SM UC-16 (Imperial German Navy). Her crew survived.
Frigido	Italy	World War I: The sailing vessel was sunk in the Gulf of Genoa by SM U-33 (Imperial German Navy).
Genova	Italy	World War I: The cargo ship was sunk in the Gulf of Genoa 2 nautical miles (3.7 km) off Portofino, Genoa (44°18′N 9°15′E) by SM U-33 (Imperial German Navy).
Jan	Netherlands	World War I: The fishing vessel was sunk in the North Sea 19 nautical miles (35 km) west north west of IJmuiden by SM UC-16 (Imperial German Navy). Her crew survived.
John Hays Hammond	United States	World War I: The schooner was captured and scuttled in the Atlantic Ocean 350 nautical miles (650 km) north west of Ireland (56°54′N 14°18′W) by SM U-44 (Imperial German Navy). Her crew survived.
Kotohira Maru	Japan	During a voyage from Japan to San Francisco, California, with a cargo of general merchandise, the 3,478-ton steamer was wrecked on the southeastern end of Amchitka Island in the Aleutian Islands. Her entire crew of 49 survived, abandoning ship in three lifeboats, one of which reached Unalaska on Unalaska Island in the Aleutian Islands. Another lifeboat reached Vancouver Island in British Columbia and the third was picked up at sea by the vessel Santa Ana (United States).
Majoor Thompson	Netherlands	World War I: The fishing vessel was sunk in the North Sea 19 nautical miles (35 km) off Zandvoort by SM UC-16 (Imperial German Navy). Her crew survived.
President Commisaris van den Burgh	Netherlands	World War I: The fishing vessel was sunk in the North Sea off the Dutch coast by SM UC-16 (Imperial German Navy). Her crew survived.
Sterna III	Netherlands	World War I: The fishing vessel was sunk in the North Sea 19 nautical miles (35 km) west north west of IJmuiden by SM UC-16 (Imperial German Navy). Her crew survived.

== 28 July ==
List of shipwrecks: 28 July 1917
Ship	State	Description
Atlas	France	World War I: The barque was torpedoed and sunk in the Atlantic Ocean 200 nautical miles (370 km) west of the Fastnet Rock (51°35′N 15°31′W) by SM U-30 (Imperial German Navy) with the loss of all hands.
Flora	United States	The barge sank in Gas House Channel, Lynn, Massachusetts.
Glenstrae	United Kingdom	World War I: The cargo ship was torpedoed and sunk in the Atlantic Ocean 66 nautical miles (122 km) south west by south of the Bishop Rock, Isles of Scilly (48°40′N 6°55′W) by SM UC-62 (Imperial German Navy) with the loss of a crew member.
Hildur	Norway	World War I: The coaster was sunk in the Atlantic Ocean 2.5 nautical miles (4.6 km) off Cape Sisargos, Spain by SM UC-69 (Imperial German Navy). Her crew survived.
John Glen	United States	The tug sank in the Housatonic River at Derby, Connecticut.
Neptunus I	Netherlands	World War I: The trawler was shelled and sunk in the North Sea off IJmuiden, North Holland by SM UC-16 (Imperial German Navy). Her crew survived.
Rigmor	Denmark	World War I: The cargo ship was torpedoed and sunk in the North Sea 16 nautical miles (30 km) off Holmengrå, Hordaland, Norway (60°49′N 4°05′E) by SM U-67 (Imperial German Navy). Her crew survived.
Saint Emilion	France	World War I: The cargo ship was sunk in the English Channel 12 nautical miles (22 km) west by south of Dungeness, Kent, United Kingdom by SM UC-65 (Imperial German Navy).
SM UB-20	Imperial German Navy	World War I: The Type UB II submarine struck a mine and sank in the North Sea off Zeebrugge, West Flanders, Belgium (51°21′N 2°38′E) with the loss of all 13 crew.

== 29 July ==
List of shipwrecks: 29 July 1917
Ship	State	Description
Adalia	United Kingdom	World War I: The cargo ship was shelled and sunk in the North Sea 85 nautical miles (157 km) north east of Muckle Flugga, Shetland Islands by SM U-94 (Imperial German Navy) with the loss of a crew member.
Anitra	Norway	World War I: The barque was sunk in the North Sea 20 nautical miles (37 km) off Hvidingsö by SM U-96 (Imperial German Navy). Her crew survived.
Bestwood	United Kingdom	The collier collided with Leander (United Kingdom) and sank in the Irish Sea off the South Bishop Lighthouse.
Cesarevitch Alexei	Russia	World War I: The cargo ship was sunk in the North Sea 8 to 10 nautical miles (15 to 19 km) east of Lerwick, Shetland Islands by SM U-60 (Imperial German Navy). Her crew survived.
Gyldenpris	Norway	World War I: The cargo ship was sunk in the Atlantic Ocean off A Coruña, Spain by SM UC-69 (Imperial German Navy).
Ingeborg	Denmark	World War I: The cargo ship was torpedoed and sunk in the North Sea 85 nautical miles (157 km) off Lerwick (60°16′N 1°25′E) by SM U-94 (Imperial German Navy). Her crew survived.
Manchester Commerce	United Kingdom	World War I: The cargo ship was torpedoed, shelled and sunk in the Strait of Gibraltar (35°52′N 6°16′W) by SM U-39 (Imperial German Navy) with the loss of a crew member.
Okhla	United Kingdom	World War I: The cargo ship struck a mine and sank in the Indian Ocean 30 nautical miles (56 km) west of Bombay, India with the loss of nine of her crew.
Saint Marcouf	France	World War I: The cargo ship was sunk in the Irish Sea 6 nautical miles (11 km) south east of the Arklow Lightship (United Kingdom) (52°53′N 5°50′W) by SM UC-75 (Imperial German Navy). Her crew survived.
SM UB-27	Imperial German Navy	World War I: The Type UB II submarine was probably rammed and sunk on this date by HMS Halcyon (Royal Navy) with the loss of all 22 crew.
Whitehall	United Kingdom	World War I: The cargo ship was torpedoed and sunk in the Atlantic Ocean 270 nautical miles (500 km) west by north of the Fastnet Rock (50°05′N 16°28′W) by SM U-95 (Imperial German Navy) with the loss of a crew member.

== 30 July ==
List of shipwrecks: 30 July 1917
Ship	State	Description
Amor	Denmark	World War I: The three-masted barque was shelled and sunk in the North Sea (56°55′N 3°36′E) by SM UC-40 (Imperial German Navy). Her crew survived.
Canis	Norway	World War I: The coaster was torpedoed and sunk in the North Sea 20 nautical miles (37 km) west of Holmengraå, Vestland off Bergen by SM U-60 (Imperial German Navy) with the loss of two crew.
Carlo	Italy	World War I: The cargo ship was sunk in the Strait of Gibraltar off Tangier, Morocco (35°24′N 6°25′W) by SM U-39 (Imperial German Navy).
Eolo	Italy	World War I: The cargo ship was sunk in the Atlantic Ocean (53°54′N 15°15′W) by SM U-95 (Imperial German Navy).
Ganges	United Kingdom	World War I: The cargo ship was torpedoed and sunk in the Atlantic Ocean 8 nautical miles (15 km) off Cape Spartel, Morocco (35°43′N 6°00′W) by SM U-39 (Imperial German Navy) with the loss of a crew member.
Hansa	Germany	The cargo ship collided with a trawler and sank in the Baltic Sea off Landsort, Sweden.
Kildin	Russia	World War I: The cargo ship was sunk in the North Sea off Lerwick, Shetland Islands, United Kingdom (61°47′N 0°35′W) by SM U-94 (Imperial German Navy).
Manchester Inventor	United Kingdom	World War I: The cargo ship was shelled and sunk in the North Sea 80 nautical miles (150 km) north north east of Muckle Flugga, Shetland Islands (61°27′N 0°38′W) by SM U-94 (Imperial German Navy). Her crew survived.
USAT Saratoga	United States Army	The troop ship was rammed at anchor by Panama (flag unknown) off Tompkinsville, New York and was filling rapidly when towed to a mudbank and beached. Later raised, repaired and put in service as USS Mercy (United States Navy). No casualties or one killed.
Souma	Russia	World War I: The cargo ship was sunk in the North Sea north north east of Muckle Flugga (61°34′N 0°55′W) by SM U-94 (Imperial German Navy).

== 31 July ==
List of shipwrecks: 31 July 1917
Ship	State	Description
Alcides	Norway	World War I: The barque was sunk in the Atlantic Ocean north west of Ireland (55°05′N 17°05′W) by SM U-54 (Imperial German Navy) with the loss of all 23 crew.
Belgian Prince	United Kingdom	World War I: The cargo ship was torpedoed and damaged in the Atlantic Ocean 175 nautical miles (324 km) north west of Tory Island, County Donegal by SM U-55 (Imperial German Navy). She was scuttled the next day with the loss of 39 crew.
Carolvore	Norway	World War I: The cargo ship was sunk in the Strait of Gibraltar 6 nautical miles (11 km) off Cape Roche, Spain (36°13′N 6°16′W) by SM U-39 (Imperial German Navy). Her crew survived.
Charlotte W. Miller	United States	The schooner sank after a collision with the submarine USS D-2 (United States Navy) near Bartletts Reef near New London, Connecticut. She was towed to the vicinity of Sarahs Ledge in Long Island Sound by USS Ontario (United States Navy) where she sank again on 1 August. Raised and towed to New London, Connecticut, declared a total loss.
USS Chingachgook	United States Navy	The patrol vessel was damaged beyond repair by the explosion of her gasoline tank at New York.
Del Norte	United States	The cargo ship ran aground at Point Arena, California and was a total loss.
Empress	United Kingdom	World War I: The cargo ship struck a mine and sank in the North Sea 4.5 nautical miles (8.3 km) east by south of the Withernsea Lighthouse, Yorkshire (53°45′N 0°08′E) by SM UC-63 (Imperial German Navy) with the loss of five of her crew.
Fremona	United Kingdom	World War I: The cargo ship was torpedoed and sunk in the English Channel 10 nautical miles (19 km) north by west of the Île de Batz, Finistère, France (48°55′N 4°11′W) by SM UC-47 (Imperial German Navy) with the loss of eleven of her crew.
Ingrid Horn	Germany	The approximately 90-metre (300 ft), 2,039-ton cargo vessel was sunk in a collision with Bergvik (Sweden) off Dalarö near Stockholm, Sweden. One crewman survived and 17 crew and 2 maritime pilots died.
Madeleine	France	World War I: The full-rigged ship was shelled and sunk in the Atlantic Ocean 190 nautical miles (350 km) west of Madeira, Portugal (33°45′N 22°50′W) by SM U-155 (Imperial German Navy) with the loss of eleven of her crew. Survivors were rescued by Santa Cecilia (United States).
Motano	United States	World War I: The tanker was torpedoed and sunk in the English Channel 20 nautical miles (37 km) south east of Start Point, Devon, United Kingdom by SM UC-47 (Imperial German Navy) with the loss of 24 of her crew.
Orubian	United Kingdom	World War I: The cargo ship was torpedoed and sunk in the Atlantic Ocean 160 nautical miles (300 km) north west of Eagle Island, County Mayo (54°47′N 14°05′W) by SM U-82 (Imperial German Navy) with the loss of a crew member.
HMS Quernmore	Royal Navy	World War I: The escort vessel was torpedoed and sunk in the Atlantic Ocean 160 nautical miles (300 km) west north west of Tory Island (54°50′N 13°11′W) by SM U-82 (Imperial German Navy) with the loss of a crew member.
Regina	Greece	World War I: The sailing vessel was sunk in the Mediterranean Sea by SM UC-22 (Imperial German Navy).
Shimosa	United Kingdom	World War I: The cargo ship was torpedoed and sunk in the Atlantic Ocean 220 nautical miles (410 km) north west of Eagle Island (55°14′N 15°05′W) by SM U-46 (Imperial German Navy) with the loss of seventeen crew.
Snowdonian	United Kingdom	World War I: The collier was scuttled in the Atlantic Ocean 245 nautical miles (454 km) south by east of Santa Maria Island, Azores, Portugal (33°44′N 22°22′W) by SM U-155 (Imperial German Navy). Her crew survived.
Ypres	United Kingdom	World War I: The coaster was shelled and sunk in the Strait of Gibraltar 2.75 nautical miles (5.09 km) off Cape Roche (36°15′N 6°14′W) by SM U-39 (Imperial German Navy). Her crew survived.

== Unknown date ==
List of shipwrecks: Unknown date 1917
Ship	State	Description
SM UC-1	Imperial German Navy	World War I: The Type UC I submarine struck a mine and sank in the North Sea off Nieuport, West Flanders, Belgium on or after 18 July with the loss of all seventeen crew.
