= Saxis =

Saxis may refer to:

- Saxis, Virginia, a town in Accomack County, Virginia, in the United States
- USS Saxis (SP-615), a United States Navy patrol boat in commission during 1917
