= SM UC-65 =

1916 German Type UC II minelaying U-boat

History

German Empire
- Name: UC-65
- Ordered: 12 January 1916
- Builder: Blohm & Voss, Hamburg
- Yard number: 281
- Launched: 8 July 1916
- Commissioned: 7 November 1916
- Fate: Torpedoed and sunk on 3 November 1917

General characteristics
- Class & type: Type UC II submarine
- Displacement: 427 t (420 long tons), surfaced; 508 t (500 long tons), submerged
- Length: 50.35 m (165 ft 2 in) o/a; 40.30 m (132 ft 3 in) pressure hull
- Beam: 5.22 m (17 ft 2 in) o/a; 3.65 m (12 ft) pressure hull
- Draught: 3.64 m (11 ft 11 in)
- Propulsion: 2 × propeller shafts; 2 × 6-cylinder, 4-stroke diesel engines, 600 PS (440 kW; 590 shp); 2 × electric motors, 620 PS (460 kW; 610 shp)
- Speed: 12.0 knots (22.2 km/h; 13.8 mph), surfaced; 7.4 knots (13.7 km/h; 8.5 mph), submerged
- Range: 10,420 nmi (19,300 km; 11,990 mi) at 7 knots (13 km/h; 8.1 mph) surfaced; 52 nmi (96 km; 60 mi) at 4 knots (7.4 km/h; 4.6 mph) submerged
- Test depth: 50 m (160 ft)
- Complement: 26
- Armament: 6 × 100 cm (39.4 in) mine tubes; 18 × UC 200 mines; 3 × 50 cm (19.7 in) torpedo tubes (2 bow/external; one stern); 7 × torpedoes; 1 × 8.8 cm (3.5 in) Uk L/30 deck gun
- Notes: 35-second diving time

Service record
- Part of: Flanders Flotilla; 3 February – 3 November 1917
- Commanders: Oblt.z.S. / Kptlt. Otto Steinbrinck; 10 November 1916 – 31 July 1917; Kptlt. Max Viebeg; 1 August – 3 September 1917; Kptlt. Claus Lafrenz; 4 September – 3 November 1917
- Operations: 11 patrols
- Victories: 101 merchant ships sunk (115,360 GRT + Unknown GRT); 1 warship sunk (11,000 tons); 4 auxiliary warships sunk (858 GRT); 9 merchant ships damaged (60,233 GRT + Unknown GRT); 1 warship damaged (850 tons); 2 auxiliary warships damaged (8,283 GRT)

SM UC-65 was a German Type UC II minelaying submarine or U-boat in the German Imperial Navy (German: Kaiserliche Marine) during World War I. The U-boat was ordered on 12 January 1916 and was launched on 8 July 1916. She was commissioned into the German Imperial Navy on 7 November 1916 as SM UC-65. (Note: "SM" stands for "Seiner Majestät" (English: His Majesty's) and combined with the U for Unterseeboot would be translated as His Majesty's Submarine.) In eleven patrols UC-65 was credited with sinking 106 ships, either by torpedo or by mines laid. UC-65 was torpedoed and sunk by HMS C15 on 3 November 1917.

== Design ==
A Type UC II submarine, UC-65 had a displacement of 427 tonnes (420 long tons) when at the surface and 508 tonnes (500 long tons) while submerged. She had a length overall of 50.35 m (165 ft 2 in), a beam of 5.22 m (17 ft 2 in), and a draught of 3.64 m (11 ft 11 in). The submarine was powered by two six-cylinder four-stroke diesel engines each producing 300 metric horsepower (220 kW; 300 shp) (a total of 600 metric horsepower (440 kW; 590 shp)), two electric motors producing 620 metric horsepower (460 kW; 610 shp), and two propeller shafts. She had a dive time of 48 seconds and was capable of operating at a depth of 50 metres (160 ft).

The submarine had a maximum surface speed of 12 knots (22 km/h; 14 mph) and a submerged speed of 7.4 knots (13.7 km/h; 8.5 mph). When submerged, she could operate for 52 nautical miles (96 km; 60 mi) at 4 knots (7.4 km/h; 4.6 mph); when surfaced, she could travel 10,420 nautical miles (19,300 km; 11,990 mi) at 7 knots (13 km/h; 8.1 mph). UC-65 was fitted with six 100 centimetres (39 in) mine tubes, eighteen UC 200 mines, three 50 centimetres (20 in) torpedo tubes (one on the stern and two on the bow), seven torpedoes, and one 8.8 cm (3.5 in) Uk L/30 deck gun. Her complement was twenty-six crew members.

== Summary of raiding history ==
Date	Name	Nationality	Tonnage (Note: Merchant ship tonnages are in gross register tons. Military vessels are listed by tons displacement.)	Fate
8 February 1917	Guillaume Tell	France	148	Sunk
8 February 1917	Mary Ann	United Kingdom	17	Sunk
10 February 1917	Sallagh	United Kingdom	325	Sunk
11 February 1917	Lycia	United Kingdom	2,715	Sunk
11 February 1917	Olivia	United Kingdom	242	Sunk
11 February 1917	Voltaire	United Kingdom	409	Sunk
12 February 1917	Pinna	United Kingdom	6,288	Damaged
13 February 1917	Friendship	United Kingdom	37	Sunk
13 February 1917	Zircon	United Kingdom	48	Sunk
14 February 1917	Ferga	United Kingdom	791	Sunk
14 February 1917	Greenland	United Kingdom	1,753	Sunk
14 February 1917	Inishowen Head	United Kingdom	3,050	Sunk
14 February 1917	Margarita	United Kingdom	375	Sunk
15 February 1917	Afton	United Kingdom	1,156	Sunk
15 February 1917	Kyanite	United Kingdom	564	Sunk
16 February 1917	Queenswood	United Kingdom	2,710	Sunk
16 February 1917	Ville De Bayonne	France	1,301	Sunk
19 February 1917	Alice	France	18	Sunk
19 February 1917	Brigade	United Kingdom	425	Sunk
19 February 1917	Justine Marie	Belgium	16	Sunk
19 February 1917	Saint Louis De Gonzague	France	53	Sunk
19 February 1917	Skrim	Norway	727	Sunk
19 February 1917	Violette	France	36	Sunk
25 February 1917	Saint Joseph	France	42	Sunk
25 February 1917	Vigda	Norway	1,851	Sunk
26 February 1917	Alberdina	Netherlands	134	Sunk
26 February 1917	Algiers	United Kingdom	2,361	Sunk
26 February 1917	Hannah Croasdell	United Kingdom	151	Sunk
27 February 1917	Brunette	France	104	Sunk
27 February 1917	HMT Evadne	Royal Navy	189	Sunk
28 February 1917	Marie Joseph	France	192	Sunk
28 February 1917	Sjøstad	Norway	1,155	Sunk
1 March 1917	Germaine	France	24	Sunk
1 March 1917	Bout De Zan	France	13	Sunk
1 March 1917	Diamond Cross	Belgium	29	Sunk
1 March 1917	Drina	United Kingdom	11,483	Sunk
1 March 1917	Elise II	France	48	Sunk
1 March 1917	Elorn	France	603	Sunk
1 March 1917	General Radiguet	France	24	Sunk
1 March 1917	HMHS Glenart Castle	Royal Navy	6,824	Damaged
1 March 1917	Homocea	France	58	Sunk
1 March 1917	Joseph Adolphine	France	21	Sunk
1 March 1917	N.D. de Lourdes	France	47	Sunk
1 March 1917	Reine des Anges	France	47	Sunk
1 March 1917	Saint Joseph	France	20	Sunk
1 March 1917	Sainte Famille	France	25	Sunk
1 March 1917	Seigneur	France	53	Sunk
1 March 1917	Sarus	United Kingdom	Unknown	Damaged
24 March 1917	Bruyere	France	100	Sunk
24 March 1917	Ennistown	United Kingdom	689	Sunk
24 March 1917	Fairearn	United Kingdom	592	Sunk
24 March 1917	Howe	United Kingdom	175	Sunk
24 March 1917	Korsnaes	Norway	732	Sunk
25 March 1917	Adenwen	United Kingdom	3,798	Sunk
25 March 1917	Brandon	United Kingdom	130	Sunk
25 March 1917	Fringante	France	124	Sunk
25 March 1917	Poseidon	Greece	2,589	Sunk
27 March 1917	Kelvinhead	United Kingdom	3,063	Sunk
28 March 1917	Ardglass	United Kingdom	778	Sunk
28 March 1917	Dagali	Norway	742	Sunk
28 March 1917	Harvest Home	United Kingdom	103	Sunk
28 March 1917	Laima	Russian Empire	148	Sunk
28 March 1917	Snowdon Range	United Kingdom	4,662	Sunk
28 March 1917	Wychwood	United Kingdom	1,985	Sunk
28 March 1917	Guillemot	United Kingdom	Unknown	Sunk
30 March 1917	HMS Puma	Royal Navy	1,459	Damaged
6 April 1917	Thelma	Norway	1,350	Sunk
7 April 1917	Lapland	United Kingdom	18,565	Damaged
9 April 1917	City of New York	United States	10,798	Damaged
26 April 1917	Agnes Cairns	United Kingdom	146	Sunk
26 April 1917	Athole	United Kingdom	150	Sunk
26 April 1917	Bretagne Et Vendee	France	79	Sunk
27 April 1917	Burrowa	United Kingdom	2,902	Sunk
28 April 1917	Alu Mendi	Spain	2,104	Sunk
1 May 1917	Helen	United Kingdom	322	Sunk
1 May 1917	Ivrig	Norway	1,197	Sunk
1 May 1917	W. D. Potts	United Kingdom	112	Sunk
2 May 1917	Amber	United Kingdom	401	Sunk
2 May 1917	Derrymore	United Kingdom	485	Sunk
2 May 1917	Dora	United Kingdom	296	Sunk
2 May 1917	Earnest	United Kingdom	111	Sunk
2 May 1917	Morion	United Kingdom	299	Sunk
2 May 1917	Saint Mungo	United Kingdom	402	Sunk
2 May 1917	Taizan Maru	Japan	3,527	Sunk
4 May 1917	New Design No.2	United Kingdom	66	Sunk
4 May 1917	Pilar De Larrinaga	United Kingdom	4,136	Sunk
4 May 1917	Strumble	United Kingdom	45	Sunk
4 May 1917	Victorious	United Kingdom	39	Sunk
7 May 1917	Maude	United Kingdom	93	Sunk
8 May 1917	San Patricio	United Kingdom	9,712	Damaged
22 May 1917	HMT Merse	Royal Navy	296	Sunk
17 June 1917	HMT Fraser	Royal Navy	310	Sunk
17 June 1917	HMS Tartar	Royal Navy	850	Damaged
18 June 1917	Gauntlet	United Kingdom	58	Sunk
18 June 1917	Væring	Denmark	2,157	Sunk
19 June 1917	Morinier	United Kingdom	3,804	Damaged
24 June 1917	Aghia Paraskevi	Greece	2,795	Sunk
24 June 1917	Constantinos	Greece	3,014	Sunk
24 June 1917	Kong Haakon	Norway	2,231	Sunk
24 June 1917	Taigetos	Greece	2,961	Sunk
25 June 1917	Petritzis	Greece	3,692	Sunk
28 June 1917	Lizzie Ellen	United Kingdom	114	Sunk
20 July 1917	Fluent	United Kingdom	3,660	Sunk
26 July 1917	HMS Ariadne	Royal Navy	11,000	Sunk
27 July 1917	Bellagio	United Kingdom	3,919	Damaged
27 July 1917	Candia	United Kingdom	6,482	Sunk
28 July 1917	Saint Emilion	France	1,112	Sunk
19 August 1917	General Dutemple	France	585	Sunk
25 August 1917	Garm	Norway	725	Sunk
25 August 1917	Nerma	Denmark	689	Sunk
29 August 1917	Laura C. Anderson	United States	960	Sunk
31 August 1917	Erissos	Greece	2,885	Damaged
1 September 1917	Peronne	France	3,342	Sunk
25 September 1917	Paolina	United States	1,337	Sunk
3 October 1917	Tasmania	Kingdom of Italy	3,662	Sunk
18 October 1917	HMD Comrades	Royal Navy	63	Sunk
31 October 1917	North Sea	United Kingdom	1,711	Sunk
2 November 1917	Branksome Hall	United Kingdom	4,262	Damaged
