= SM UC-72 =

German Type UC II minelaying U-boat

History

German Empire
- Name: UC-72
- Ordered: 12 January 1916
- Builder: Blohm & Voss, Hamburg
- Yard number: 288
- Launched: 12 August 1916
- Commissioned: 5 December 1916
- Fate: Mined in 24 August 1917

General characteristics
- Class & type: Type UC II submarine
- Displacement: 427 t (420 long tons), surfaced; 508 t (500 long tons), submerged
- Length: 50.35 m (165 ft 2 in) o/a; 40.30 m (132 ft 3 in) pressure hull
- Beam: 5.22 m (17 ft 2 in) o/a; 3.65 m (12 ft) pressure hull
- Draught: 3.64 m (11 ft 11 in)
- Propulsion: 2 × propeller shafts; 2 × 6-cylinder, 4-stroke diesel engines, 600 PS (440 kW; 590 shp); 2 × electric motors, 620 PS (460 kW; 610 shp)
- Speed: 12.0 knots (22.2 km/h; 13.8 mph), surfaced; 7.4 knots (13.7 km/h; 8.5 mph), submerged
- Range: 10,420 nmi (19,300 km; 11,990 mi) at 7 knots (13 km/h; 8.1 mph) surfaced; 52 nmi (96 km; 60 mi) at 4 knots (7.4 km/h; 4.6 mph) submerged
- Test depth: 50 m (160 ft)
- Complement: 26
- Armament: 6 × 100 cm (39.4 in) mine tubes; 18 × UC 200 mines; 3 × 50 cm (19.7 in) torpedo tubes (2 bow/external; one stern); 7 × torpedoes; 1 × 8.8 cm (3.5 in) Uk L/30 deck gun
- Notes: 35-second diving time

Service record
- Part of: Flandern Flotilla; 17 February – 25 August 1917
- Commanders: Oblt.z.S. Ernst Voigt; 5 December 1916 – 25 August 1917
- Operations: 8 patrols
- Victories: 39 merchant ships sunk (58,440 GRT); 2 auxiliary warships sunk (259 GRT); 2 auxiliary warships damaged (1,529 GRT)

SM UC-72 was a German Type UC II minelaying submarine or U-boat in the German Imperial Navy (German: Kaiserliche Marine) during World War I. The U-boat was ordered on 12 January 1916 and was launched on 12 August 1916. She was commissioned into the German Imperial Navy on 5 December 1916 as SM UC-72. (Note: "SM" stands for "Seiner Majestät" (English: His Majesty's) and combined with the U for Unterseeboot would be translated as His Majesty's Submarine.) In eight patrols UC-72 was credited with sinking 41 ships, either by torpedo or by mines laid. UC-72 disappeared after 21 August 1917.

The wreck of UC-72 was identified by marine archaeologist Innes McCartney off Dover in 2013. The wreck seems to have fallen victim to a mine while inbound from patrol.

== Design ==
A Type UC II submarine, UC-72 had a displacement of 427 tonnes (420 long tons) when at the surface and 508 tonnes (500 long tons) while submerged. She had a length overall of 50.35 m (165 ft 2 in), a beam of 5.22 m (17 ft 2 in), and a draught of 3.64 m (11 ft 11 in). The submarine was powered by two six-cylinder four-stroke diesel engines each producing 300 metric horsepower (220 kW; 300 shp) (a total of 600 metric horsepower (440 kW; 590 shp)), two electric motors producing 620 metric horsepower (460 kW; 610 shp), and two propeller shafts. She had a dive time of 48 seconds and was capable of operating at a depth of 50 metres (160 ft).

The submarine had a maximum surface speed of 12 knots (22 km/h; 14 mph) and a submerged speed of 7.4 knots (13.7 km/h; 8.5 mph). When submerged, she could operate for 52 nautical miles (96 km; 60 mi) at 4 knots (7.4 km/h; 4.6 mph); when surfaced, she could travel 10,420 nautical miles (19,300 km; 11,990 mi) at 7 knots (13 km/h; 8.1 mph). UC-72 was fitted with six 100 centimetres (39 in) mine tubes, eighteen UC 200 mines, three 50 centimetres (20 in) torpedo tubes (one on the stern and two on the bow), seven torpedoes, and one 8.8 cm (3.5 in) Uk L/30 deck gun. Her complement was twenty-six crew members.

== Summary of raiding history ==
Date	Name	Nationality	Tonnage (Note: Merchant ship tonnages are in gross register tons. Military vessels are listed by tons displacement.)	Fate
13 March 1917	Reward	United Kingdom	172	Sunk
24 March 1917	HMT Kings Grey	Royal Navy	338	Damaged
1 April 1917	Eastern Belle	United Kingdom	97	Sunk
26 April 1917	HMD Plantin	Royal Navy	84	Sunk
27 April 1917	Good Hope	United Kingdom	89	Sunk
29 April 1917	Bayonnais	France	20	Sunk
29 April 1917	Eugenie Et Lucie	France	34	Sunk
29 April 1917	Frere Des Cinq Soeurs	France	20	Sunk
29 April 1917	Petit Ernest	France	20	Sunk
1 May 1917	Acacia	France	9	Sunk
1 May 1917	Antigone	France	15	Sunk
1 May 1917	Camille Amelie	France	21	Sunk
2 May 1917	Cancalais	France	231	Sunk
2 May 1917	Keryado	French Navy	175	Sunk
2 May 1917	Victoire	France	290	Sunk
2 May 1917	Russie	France	127	Sunk
2 May 1917	Yvonne	France	100	Sunk
4 May 1917	Mamelena IX	Spain	115	Sunk
4 May 1917	Mamelena XII	Spain	111	Sunk
4 May 1917	Marne II	France	250	Sunk
4 May 1917	Verdun	France	25	Sunk
5 May 1917	Nydal	Norway	1,809	Sunk
6 May 1917	Francesco	Kingdom of Italy	3,438	Sunk
28 May 1917	Detlef Wagner	United Kingdom	225	Sunk
2 June 1917	Ereaga	Spain	2,233	Sunk
2 June 1917	Skarpsno	Norway	1,766	Sunk
2 June 1917	St. Sunniva	Norway	1,140	Sunk
3 June 1917	Rosario	Uruguay	1,565	Sunk
6 June 1917	Saint Eloi	France	1,993	Sunk
8 June 1917	Sequana	French Navy	5,557	Sunk
3 July 1917	Henrik	Norway	3,928	Sunk
7 July 1917	Massapequa	United States	3,193	Sunk
8 July 1917	Cambronne	France	1,863	Sunk
8 July 1917	M. I. Mandal	Denmark	1,886	Sunk
8 July 1917	Mary W. Bowen	United States	2,153	Sunk
9 July 1917	Ceres	France	296	Sunk
11 July 1917	Anglo-Patagonian	United Kingdom	5,017	Sunk
15 July 1917	Trelissick	United Kingdom	4,168	Sunk
16 August 1917	Delphic	United Kingdom	8,273	Sunk
17 August 1917	Meuse II	France	5,270	Sunk
19 August 1917	HMS Penshurst	Royal Navy	1,191	Damaged
21 August 1917	HS 4	United Kingdom	121	Sunk
21 August 1917	RB 6	United Kingdom	800	Sunk
