= SS Oslo (1906) =

British passenger ship

History
- Name: Oslo
- Owner: Wilson Thos., Sons & Co. Ltd. - Wilson Line Of Hull - Wilson C.H.
- Operator: Wilson Line
- Port of registry: Hull, United Kingdom
- Builder: Earle's Shipbuilding & Engineering Co, Hull
- Yard number: 515
- Launched: 9 April 1906
- Completed: 19 May 1906
- Maiden voyage: 25 May 1906
- Identification: Official number 123251
- Fate: Torpedoed and sunk 21 August 1917

General characteristics
- Type: Passenger ship
- Tonnage: 2,296 GRT
- Length: 88.4 metres (290 ft 0 in)
- Beam: 11.9 metres (39 ft 1 in)
- Depth: 7.7 metres (25 ft 3 in)
- Decks: 2
- Installed power: Triple expansion steam engine
- Propulsion: Screw propeller
- Speed: 13 knots
- Capacity: 598 Passengers; 62 First Class; 36 Second Class; 90 Third Class; 410 Steerage
- Crew: 183

SS Oslo was a British passenger ship that was torpedoed by the German submarine SM U-87 in the North Sea 15 nautical miles (28 km) east by north of the Out Skerries, Shetland Islands. She was travelling from Trondheim, Norway to Liverpool, United Kingdom while carrying passengers and a cargo of copper ore.

== Construction and maiden voyage ==
SS Oslo was constructed in 1906 with yard no. 515 at the Earle's Shipbuilding & Engineering Co. shipyard in Hull, United Kingdom. She was launched on 9 April 1906 and finally completed on 19 May 1906. She departed on her maiden voyage on the Kristiania (Oslo) - Kristiansand - Hull service on 25 May 1906.

=== Ship characteristics ===
Oslo's tonnage was 2,296 GRT, 2,035 GRT under deck and 1.427 net. The ship was 88.4 metres (290 ft 0 in) long, with a beam of 11.9 metres (39 ft 1 in) and a depth of 7.7 metres (25 ft 3 in), and a forecastle of 10.9 metres (35 ft 9 in) long. She had one funnel, two masts, steel construction and a single screw, 2 decks, water ballast, and was fitted with electric light.

The ship was propelled by a triple expansion engine 3 cylinders of 0.55 metres (1 ft 10 in), 0.9 metres (2 ft 11 in) & 1.52 metres (5 ft 0 in) diameter. On sea trials on 12 May 1906, she achieved a speed of 13½ miles (13 knots). Respectively; stroke 1.06 metres (3 ft 6 in). The engine was rated at 233 nhp, it was built by the same company as the hull.

There was accommodation for 95 1st class, 32 2nd class and 90 3rd class passengers in permanent accommodation, with provision for about 410 other steerage in temporary berths.

== Routes ==
The ship was built specially for the Christiania route. But from 1911 onward SS Oslo was also engaged on other Norwegian routes, and was seen several times on the Trondheim - Hull service. The last departure that SS Oslo made from Christiania was on 20 March 1915.

== Earlier Incident and sinking ==
SS Oslo survived one attack in October 1915 by outrunning her assailant and making it safely to her destination.

On 21 August 1917, Oslo was en route from Trondheim, Norway to Liverpool, United Kingdom while carrying passengers and a cargo of copper ore. Oslo was struck by a torpedo from SM U-87 in the North Sea, 15 nautical miles (28 km) east by north of the Out Skerries, Shetland Islands. The ship sank to a depth of over 88 metres (289 ft).
