= SM UC-62 =

German World War I submarine

History

German Empire
- Name: UC-62
- Ordered: 12 January 1916
- Builder: AG Weser, Bremen
- Yard number: 260
- Laid down: 3 April 1916
- Launched: 9 December 1916
- Commissioned: 8 January 1917
- Fate: Sunk by mine, 14 October 1917

General characteristics
- Class & type: Type UC II submarine
- Displacement: 422 t (415 long tons), surfaced; 504 t (496 long tons), submerged
- Length: 51.85 m (170 ft 1 in) o/a; 40.40 m (132 ft 7 in) pressure hull
- Beam: 5.22 m (17 ft 2 in) o/a; 3.65 m (12 ft) pressure hull
- Draught: 3.67 m (12 ft 0 in)
- Propulsion: 2 × propeller shafts; 2 × 6-cylinder, 4-stroke diesel engines, 600 PS (440 kW; 590 shp); 2 × electric motors, 620 PS (460 kW; 610 shp)
- Speed: 11.9 knots (22.0 km/h; 13.7 mph), surfaced; 7.2 knots (13.3 km/h; 8.3 mph), submerged
- Range: 8,000 nmi (15,000 km; 9,200 mi) at 7 knots (13 km/h; 8.1 mph) surfaced; 59 nmi (109 km; 68 mi) at 4 knots (7.4 km/h; 4.6 mph) submerged
- Test depth: 50 m (160 ft)
- Complement: 26
- Armament: 6 × 100 cm (39.4 in) mine tubes; 18 × UC 200 mines; 3 × 50 cm (19.7 in) torpedo tubes (2 bow/external; one stern); 7 × torpedoes; 1 × 8.8 cm (3.5 in) Uk L/30 deck gun
- Notes: 30-second diving time

Service record
- Part of: Flandern Flotilla; 26 March – 14 October 1917
- Commanders: Oblt.z.S. Max Schmitz; 8 January – 14 October 1917
- Operations: 9 patrols
- Victories: 10 merchant ships sunk (16,488 GRT); 1 auxiliary warship sunk (247 GRT); 2 merchant ships damaged (2,935 GRT); 1 auxiliary warship damaged (122 GRT)

SM UC-62 was a German Type UC II minelaying submarine or U-boat in the German Imperial Navy (German: Kaiserliche Marine) during World War I. The U-boat was ordered on 12 January 1916, laid down on 3 April 1916, and was launched on 9 December 1916. She was commissioned into the German Imperial Navy on 8 January 1917 as SM UC-62. (Note: "SM" stands for "Seiner Majestät" (English: His Majesty's) and combined with the U for Unterseeboot would be translated as His Majesty's Submarine.) In nine patrols UC-62 was credited with sinking 11 ships, either by torpedo or by mines laid. On 19 March 1917, the submerged Royal Navy submarine HMS E50 suffered damage in a collision UC-62 in the North Sea off the North Hinder Light Vessel. UC-62 struck a mine and sank in the North Sea off Zeebrugge, Belgium, on 14 October 1917.

== Design ==
A Type UC II submarine, UC-62 had a displacement of 422 tonnes (415 long tons) when at the surface and 504 tonnes (496 long tons) while submerged. She had a length overall of 50.35 m (165 ft 2 in), a beam of 5.22 m (17 ft 2 in), and a draught of 3.67 m (12 ft 0 in). The submarine was powered by two six-cylinder four-stroke diesel engines each producing 300 metric horsepower (220 kW; 300 shp) (a total of 600 metric horsepower (440 kW; 590 shp)), two electric motors producing 620 metric horsepower (460 kW; 610 shp), and two propeller shafts. She had a dive time of 48 seconds and was capable of operating at a depth of 50 metres (160 ft).

The submarine had a maximum surface speed of 11.9 knots (22.0 km/h; 13.7 mph) and a submerged speed of 7.2 knots (13.3 km/h; 8.3 mph). When submerged, she could operate for 59 nautical miles (109 km; 68 mi) at 4 knots (7.4 km/h; 4.6 mph); when surfaced, she could travel 8,000 nautical miles (15,000 km; 9,200 mi) at 7 knots (13 km/h; 8.1 mph). UC-62 was fitted with six 100 centimetres (39 in) mine tubes, eighteen UC 200 mines, three 50 centimetres (20 in) torpedo tubes (one on the stern and two on the bow), seven torpedoes, and one 8.8 cm (3.5 in) Uk L/30 deck gun. Her complement was twenty-six crew members.

== Summary of raiding history ==
Date	Name	Nationality	Tonnage (Note: Merchant ship tonnages are in gross register tons. Military vessels are listed by tons displacement.)	Fate
5 April 1917	HMS Result	Royal Navy	122	Damaged
2 May 1917	Noordzee	Netherlands	136	Sunk
4 May 1917	Neptunus	Netherlands	160	Sunk
24 May 1917	Chicago City	United Kingdom	2,324	Damaged
30 May 1917	Lisbon	United Kingdom	1,203	Sunk
24 June 1917	HMT Taipo	Royal Navy	247	Sunk
26 June 1917	A. B. Sherman	United States	611	Damaged
28 June 1917	Neotsfield	United Kingdom	1,875	Sunk
28 June 1917	Don Arturo	United Kingdom	3,680	Sunk
25 July 1917	Vaarbud	Norway	362	Sunk
27 July 1917	Carmela	United States	1,379	Sunk
28 July 1917	Glenstrae	United Kingdom	4,718	Sunk
26 August 1917	Chacma	Norway	608	Sunk
15 October 1917	Hartburn	United Kingdom	2,367	Sunk
