= SS Delphic (1897) =

Ocean liner of the White Star Line

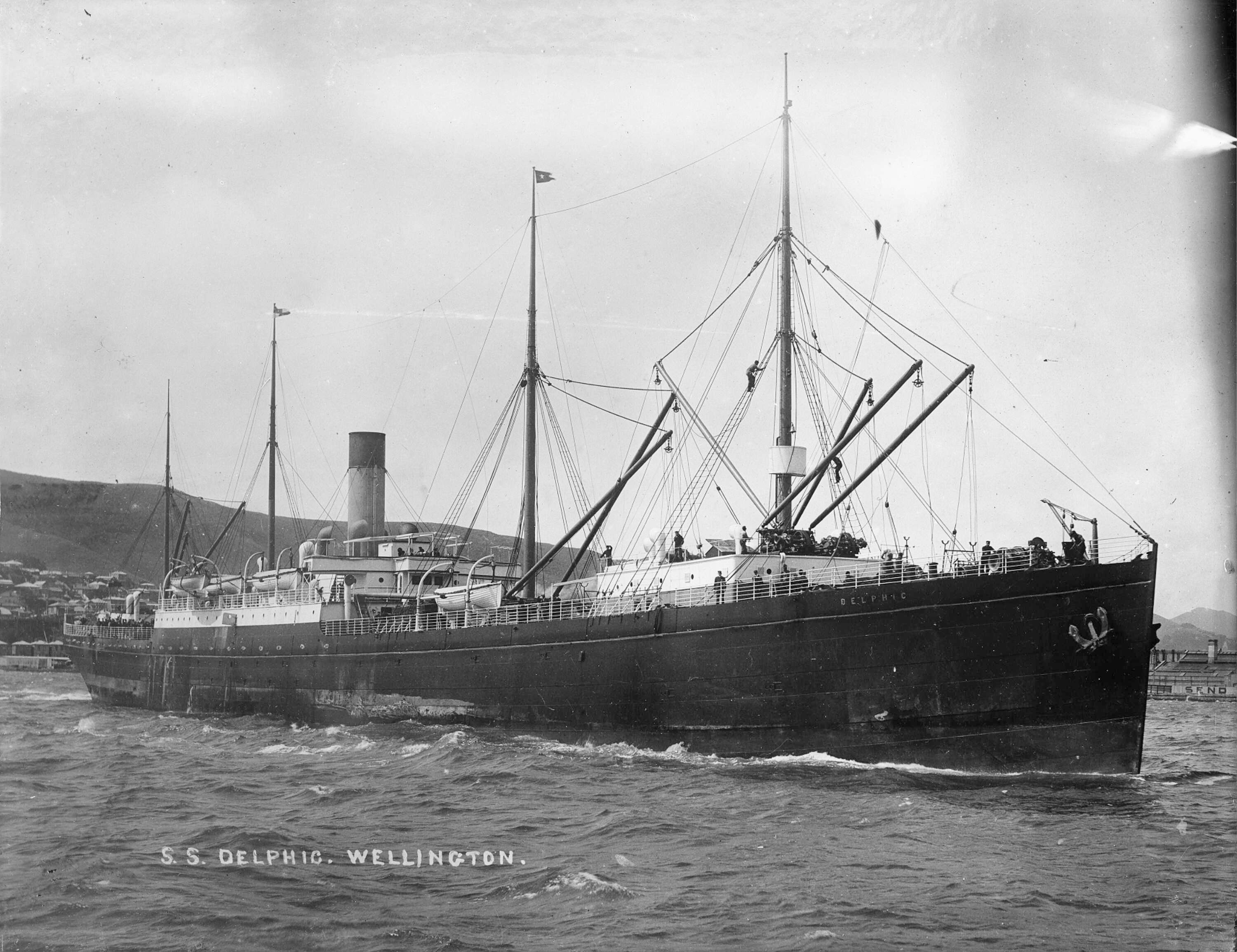
- SS Delphic

History

United Kingdom
- Name: Delphic
- Owner: White Star Line
- Builder: Harland and Wolff, Belfast
- Yard number: 309
- Launched: 5 January 1897
- Completed: 15 May 1897
- Maiden voyage: 17 June 1897
- Out of service: 16 August 1917
- Fate: Torpedoed and sunk, 16 August 1917

General characteristics
- Type: Ocean liner
- Tonnage: 8,273 GRT
- Length: 475.11 ft (144.8 m)
- Beam: 55.3 ft (16.9 m)
- Installed power: 3,000 ihp (2,200 kW)
- Propulsion: Two triple expansion steam engines
- Speed: 11 knots (20 km/h; 13 mph) service speed
- Capacity: 1,000 passengers

SS Delphic was an ocean liner of the White Star Line, built by Harland & Wolff in Belfast and completed on 15 May 1897. She was assigned to the New Zealand route. She was a fairly slow ship primarily intended for transporting emigrants and goods to New Zealand. Despite this, she made her first crossings on the New York route before joining the route to New Zealand. For twenty years, her service on this route was uneventful, with the exception of troop transport missions during the Second Boer War.

World War I did not disturb her service until March 1917, when she was requisitioned to serve in the war effort. It was during a crossing to South America, the following May, that the ship was torpedoed by the German submarine UC-72. Five people were killed, but the ship sank slowly enough that the rest of the crew could be evacuated, before the ship was sunk by additional torpedoes.

== Characteristics ==
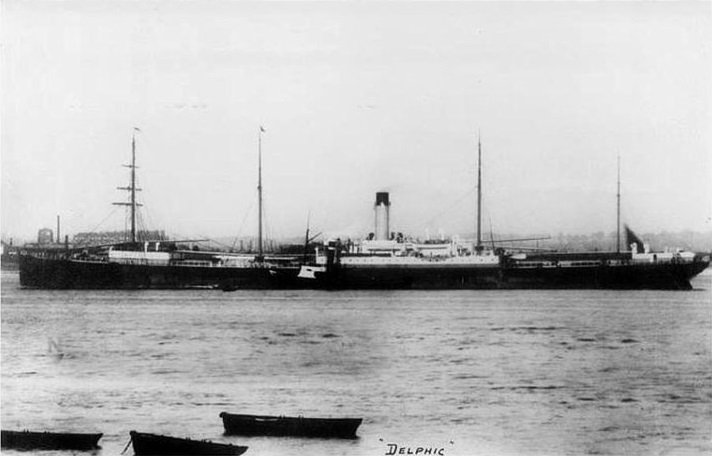
Delphic

At 144.8 metres (475 ft 1 in) in length and 16.9 m (55 ft 5 in) in width, Delphic was built as a smaller and slower version of the earlier liner Gothic which also served the New Zealand route, but more space was given over to passenger accommodation rather than cargo, and this gave Delphic a capacity for 1,000 steerage passengers. She sported a classic silhouette for ships of the time, with four masts (unlike those aboard Gothic's, Delphic's forward mast could carry sails) surrounding a funnel in the colours of the White Star Line: brown ochre with black cuff.

Powered by triple expansion engines that turned a single propeller, she sailed at a speed of 11 to 12 knots (20 to 22 km/h; 13 to 14 mph), slower than her fellow ships. This speed therefore made her suitable for transporting a less affluent clientele, made up of emigrants.

== History ==
In 1884, the White Star Line inaugurated its service to New Zealand in order to diversify its activities. It did not go into the business alone as the service was joint with Shaw, Savill & Albion Line which had a good knowledge of the region while its partner brought significant financial resources. Thus, the service was launched with three ships of the White Star, Coptic, Ionic and Doric, and two ships of the Shaw, Savill & Albion, Arawa and Tainui. This service quickly turned out to be very promising. Thus, in 1893, White Star brought a new ship to the fleet, Gothic; she was the largest ship on this route, and her first-class facilities offered comfort on the same level as that of the ships on the prestigious transatlantic route.

In 1897, a slightly smaller version of Gothic (although at a higher tonnage) was ordered to join the route, captained by James 'John' Breen who had previously worked as chief officer aboard Gothic which became Delphic. Slower, she was intended for the transport of a thousand migrants as well as goods. The ship, built by the Harland & Wolff shipyards, was launched on 5 January 1897. Upon her delivery in May 1897 to White Star Line, it was decided to give Delphic's machinery a run in with several voyages on the Atlantic, as such her maiden voyage began on 17 June between Liverpool and New York, she made two round trips across the Atlantic before entering service on her intended route between London and Wellington on 3 October 1897.

Her career on this new route was uneventful for nearly twenty years, with the exception of the very beginning of the 20th century. She was requisitioned on 31 March 1900 to transport 1,200 soldiers from London to Cape Town as part of the Second Boer War, after which she continued her service on the route to New Zealand. On 4 April 1901, she was again employed for this purpose, this time from Queenstown.

Following the outbreak of World War I in 1914, she remained on her commercial service. On 16 February 1917, Delphic narrowly avoided being torpedoed by the German submarine U-60 off the south coast of Ireland; the torpedo was fired, but just missed the ship. In March 1917, she was taken over under the Liner Requisition Scheme. On 16 August 1917, Delphic was torpedoed and sunk by the Imperial German Navy submarine UC-72 135 miles (217 km) from Bishop Rock, Isles of Scilly (48°30′N 9°10′W), during a coal transport voyage from Cardiff, Wales, to Montevideo, Uruguay. Five people were killed in the sinking.

== Bibliography ==
- Anderson, Roy Claude (1964). White Star. Prescot: T. Stephenson & Sons Ltd. OCLC 3134809.
- de Kerbrech, Richard (2009). Ships of the White Star Line. Shepperton: Ian Allan Publishing. ISBN 978-0-7110-3366-5.
- Eaton, John; Haas, Charles (1989). Falling Star, Misadventures of White Star Line Ships. Patrick Stephens Ltd. ISBN 1-85260-084-5.
- Haws, Duncan (1990). White Star Line. Merchant Fleets. Vol. 17. Hereford: TCL Publications. ISBN 0-946378-16-9. OCLC 50214776.
