= SM U-45 =

History

German Empire
- Name: U-45
- Ordered: 22 June 1914
- Builder: Kaiserliche Werft Danzig
- Yard number: 23
- Launched: 15 April 1915
- Commissioned: 9 October 1915
- Fate: Sunk 12 September 1917

General characteristics
- Class & type: Type U-43 submarine
- Displacement: 725 t (714 long tons) surfaced; 940 t (930 long tons) submerged
- Length: 65.00 m (213 ft 3 in) (o/a)
- Beam: 6.20 m (20 ft 4 in) (oa); 4.18 m (13 ft 9 in) (pressure hull)
- Height: 9.00 m (29 ft 6 in)
- Draught: 3.74 m (12 ft 3 in)
- Installed power: 2 × 2,000 PS (1,471 kW; 1,973 shp) surfaced; 2 × 1,200 PS (883 kW; 1,184 shp) submerged
- Propulsion: 2 shafts
- Speed: 15.2 knots (28.2 km/h; 17.5 mph) surfaced; 9.7 knots (18.0 km/h; 11.2 mph) submerged
- Range: 11,400 nmi (21,100 km; 13,100 mi) at 8 knots (15 km/h; 9.2 mph) surfaced; 51 nmi (94 km; 59 mi) at 5 knots (9.3 km/h; 5.8 mph) submerged
- Test depth: 50 m (164 ft 1 in)
- Complement: 36
- Armament: 6 × torpedo tubes (four bow, two stern); 8 torpedoes; 1 × 8.8 cm (3.5 in) SK L/30 deck gun with 276 rounds

Service record
- Part of: III Flotilla; 11 November 1916 - 12 September 1917
- Commanders: Kptlt. Erich Sittenfeld; 9 October 1915 - 12 September 1917
- Operations: 7 patrols
- Victories: 27 merchant ships sunk (47,286 GRT); 1 merchant ship damaged (3,891 GRT)

SM U-45 (Note: "SM" stands for "Seiner Majestät" (English: His Majesty's) and combined with the U for Unterseeboot would be translated as His Majesty's Submarine.) was one of the 329 submarines serving in the Imperial German Navy in World War I. U-45 was engaged in the naval warfare and took part in the First Battle of the Atlantic.

U-45 was torpedoed and sunk in the Atlantic Ocean north of Ireland (55°48′N 7°30′W) by the Royal Navy submarine HMS D7 on 12 September 1917 with the loss of 43 of her 45 crewmen.

== Summary of raiding history ==
Date	Name	Nationality	Tonnage (Note: Tonnages are in gross register tons)	Fate
27 April 1916	Industry	United Kingdom	4,044	Sunk
30 April 1916	Vinifreda	Spain	1,441	Sunk
2 May 1916	Le Pilier	France	2,427	Sunk
2 May 1916	Maud	United Kingdom	120	Sunk
5 July 1916	Geertruida	Netherlands	140	Sunk
28 September 1916	Fuchsia	United Kingdom	145	Sunk
21 January 1917	Gladys	United Kingdom	275	Sunk
21 January 1917	Lucy	United Kingdom	280	Sunk
21 January 1917	Star of the Sea	United Kingdom	197	Sunk
26 January 1917	Tabasco	United Kingdom	2,987	Sunk
2 February 1917	Garnet Hill	Russian Empire	2,272	Sunk
3 February 1917	Belford	United Kingdom	1,905	Sunk
3 February 1917	Eavestone	United Kingdom	1,858	Sunk
4 February 1917	Eridania	Kingdom of Italy	3,171	Sunk
4 February 1917	Thor II	Norway	2,144	Sunk
10 February 1917	Ostrich	United Kingdom	148	Sunk
28 April 1917	Olga	Russian Empire	1,672	Sunk
3 May 1917	Palm Branch	United Kingdom	3,891	Damaged
3 May 1917	Truvor	Russian Empire	2,462	Sunk
11 May 1917	Hermes	Russian Empire	3,579	Sunk
19 May 1917	Elise	Denmark	137	Sunk
1 July 1917	Eclipse	United Kingdom	185	Sunk
15 July 1917	Mariston	United Kingdom	2,908	Sunk
16 July 1917	Ribston	United Kingdom	3,372	Sunk
17 July 1917	Haworth	United Kingdom	4,456	Sunk
20 July 1917	Nevisbrook	United Kingdom	3,140	Sunk
21 July 1917	Dafila	United Kingdom	1,754	Sunk
24 July 1917	Zateja	Russian Empire	67	Sunk

== Bibliography ==
- Gröner, Erich; Jung, Dieter; Maass, Martin (1991). U-boats and Mine Warfare Vessels. German Warships 1815–1945. Vol. 2. Translated by Thomas, Keith; Magowan, Rachel. London: Conway Maritime Press. ISBN 0-85177-593-4.
- Rössler, Eberhard (1981). The U-boat : the evolution and technical history of German submarines. London: Cassell. ISBN 0304361208.
