= HMS E50 =

Submarine of the Royal Navy

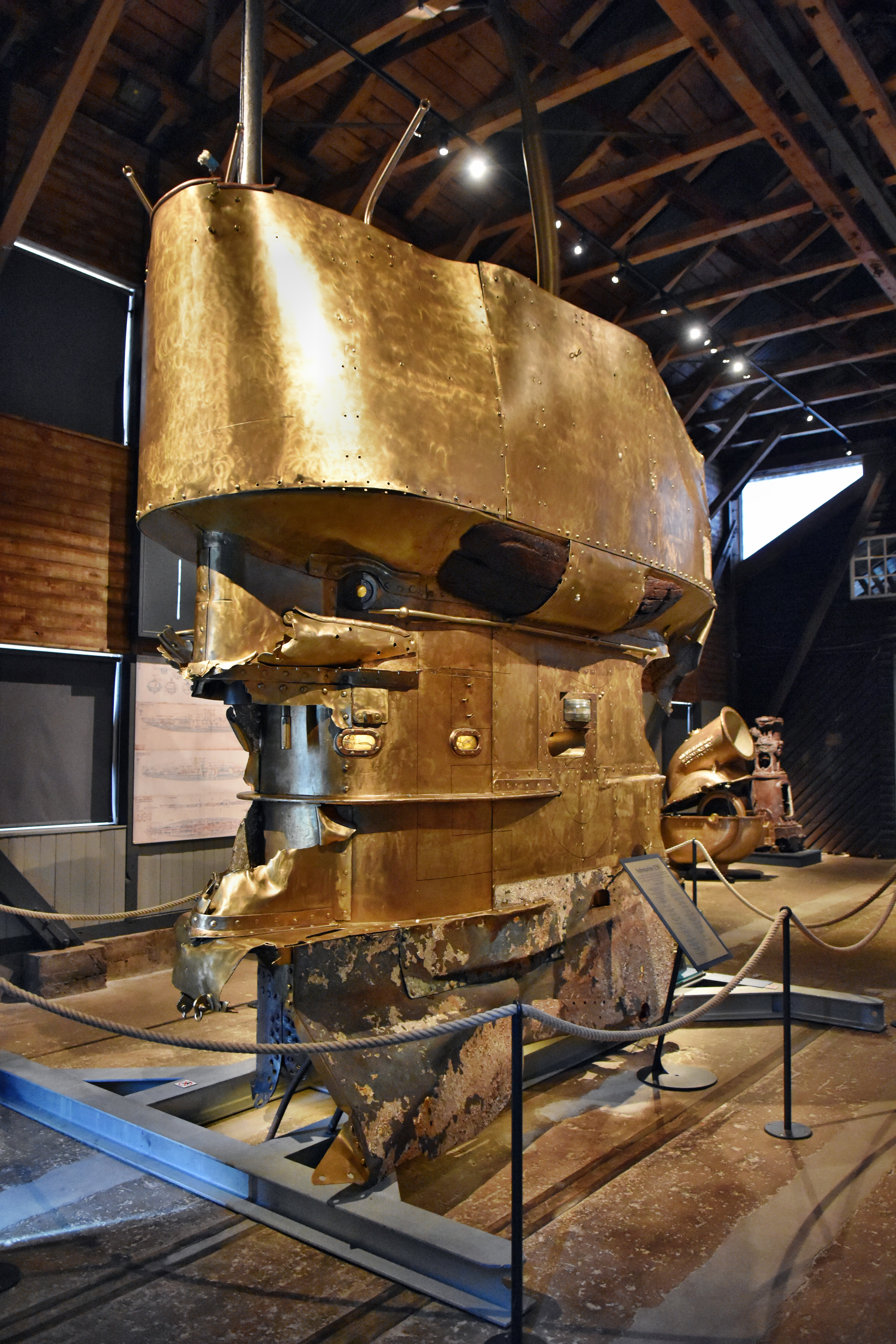
- The restored conning tower from HMS E50

History

United Kingdom
- Name: E50
- Builder: John Brown, Clydebank
- Launched: 13 November 1916
- Commissioned: 23 January 1917
- Fate: Sunk 1 February 1918

General characteristics
- Class & type: E-class submarine
- Displacement: 662 long tons (673 t) surfaced; 807 long tons (820 t) submerged
- Length: 181 ft (55 m)
- Beam: 15 ft (4.6 m)
- Propulsion: 2 × 800 hp (597 kW) diesel; 2 × 420 hp (313 kW) electric; 2 screws
- Speed: 15 knots (28 km/h; 17 mph) surfaced; 10 knots (19 km/h; 12 mph) submerged
- Range: 3,000 nmi (5,600 km) at 10 kn (19 km/h; 12 mph) surfaced; 65 nmi (120 km) at 5 kn (9.3 km/h; 5.8 mph) surfaced
- Complement: 31
- Armament: 5 × 18 inch (450 mm) torpedo tubes (2 bow, 2 beam, 1 stern); 1 × 12-pounder gun

HMS E50 was a British E-class submarine built by John Brown, Clydebank. She was launched on 13 November 1916 and was commissioned on 23 January 1917. E50 was damaged in a collision with the Imperial German Navy submarine UC-62 while submerged in the North Sea off the North Hinder Light Vessel on 19 March 1917.

E50 was lost on 1 February 1918, and it was earlier believed that she struck a mine in the North Sea off the South Dogger Light Vessel. In 2011 the wreck was found by a Danish Expedition much closer to the Danish coast, 65 NM west of Nymindegab.

== Design ==
Like all post-E8 British E-class submarines, E50 had a displacement of 662 long tons (673 t) at the surface and 807 long tons (820 t) while submerged. She had a total length of 180 feet (55 m) and a beam of 22 feet 8.5 inches (6.922 m). She was powered by two 800 horsepower (600 kW) Vickers eight-cylinder two-stroke diesel engines and two 420 horsepower (310 kW) electric motors. The submarine had a maximum surface speed of 16 knots (30 km/h; 18 mph) and a submerged speed of 10 knots (19 km/h; 12 mph). British E-class submarines had fuel capacities of 50 long tons (51 t) of diesel and ranges of 3,255 miles (5,238 km; 2,829 nmi) when travelling at 10 knots (19 km/h; 12 mph). E50 was capable of operating submerged for five hours when travelling at 5 knots (9.3 km/h; 5.8 mph).

E50 was armed with a 12-pounder 76 mm (3.0 in) QF gun mounted forward of the conning tower. She had five 18 inch (450 mm) torpedo tubes, two in the bow, one either side amidships, and one in the stern; a total of 10 torpedoes were carried.

E-Class submarines had wireless systems with 1 kilowatt (1.3 hp) power ratings; in some submarines, these were later upgraded to 3 kilowatts (4.0 hp) systems by removing a midship torpedo tube. Their maximum design depth was 100 feet (30 m) although in service some reached depths of below 200 feet (61 m). Some submarines contained Fessenden oscillator systems.

== Salvage and commemoration ==
The conning tower from E50 was in a very bad state when it was rediscovered by a Danish expedition in 2011.The tower was already torn off the hull and was laying isolated on the seabed, seriously damaged by heavy fishing gear. The Danish team decided to raise the remnants in order to prevent complete destruction, and could do so in compliance with international law.

Afterwards the tower went through a very comprehensive restoration, and since 2015 it has been on display at Sea War Museum Jutland in Thyborøn, where also the 31 men, who lost their life in the submarine, are commemorated on a plaque in front of the tower.

== Bibliography ==
- Gardiner, Robert, ed. (1985). Conway′s All the World′s Fighting Ships 1906-1921. Annapolis, Maryland: Naval Institute Press. ISBN 0-87021-907-3.
- Hutchinson, Robert (2001). Jane's Submarines: War Beneath the Waves from 1776 to the Present Day. London: HarperCollins. ISBN 978-0-00-710558-8. OCLC 53783010 – via Internet Archive.
