= SM U-58 =

Coordinates: 51°37′N 8°12′W

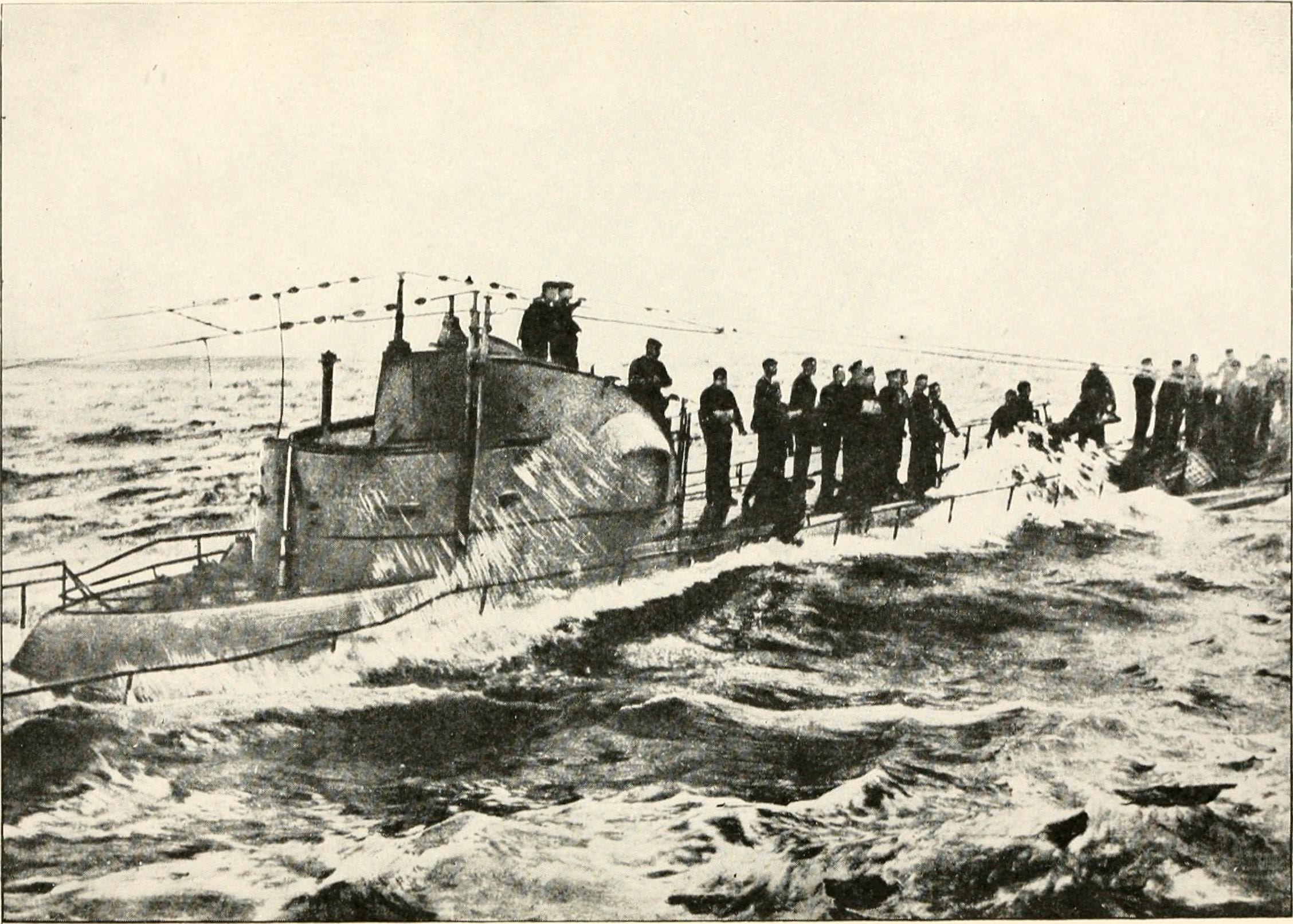
- Sailors from U-58 abandoning ship

History

German Empire
- Name: U-58
- Ordered: 6 October 1914
- Builder: AG Weser, Bremen
- Yard number: 213
- Laid down: 8 June 1915
- Launched: 31 May 1916
- Commissioned: 9 August 1916
- Fate: Depth charged and sunk, 17 November 1917

General characteristics
- Class & type: Type U 57 submarine
- Displacement: 786 t (774 long tons) surfaced; 956 t (941 long tons) submerged
- Length: 67.00 m (219 ft 10 in) (o/a); 54.22 m (177 ft 11 in) (pressure hull)
- Beam: 6.32 m (20 ft 9 in) (oa); 4.05 m (13 ft 3 in) (pressure hull)
- Height: 8.05 m (26 ft 5 in)
- Draught: 3.79 m (12 ft 5 in)
- Installed power: 2 × 1,800 PS (1,324 kW; 1,775 shp) surfaced; 2 × 1,200 PS (883 kW; 1,184 shp) submerged
- Propulsion: 2 shafts
- Speed: 14.7 knots (27.2 km/h; 16.9 mph) surfaced; 8.4 knots (15.6 km/h; 9.7 mph) submerged
- Range: 7,730 nmi (14,320 km; 8,900 mi) at 8 knots (15 km/h; 9.2 mph) surfaced; 55 nmi (102 km; 63 mi) at 5 knots (9.3 km/h; 5.8 mph) submerged
- Test depth: 50 m (164 ft 1 in)
- Complement: 36
- Armament: 4 × 50 cm (19.7 in) torpedo tubes (two bow, two stern); 7 torpedoes; 1 × 10.5 cm (4.1 in) SK L/45 deck gun; 1 × 8.8 cm (3.5 in) SK L/30 deck gun

Service record
- Part of: II Flotilla; 16 October 1916 - 17 November 1917
- Commanders: Kptlt. Kurt Wippern; 9 August 1916 – 3 June 1917; Kptlt. Peter Hermann; 4–26 June 1917; Kptlt. Karl Scherb; 27 June – 30 October 1917; Kptlt. Gustav Amberger; 31 October – 17 November 1917
- Operations: 8 patrols
- Victories: 20 merchant ships sunk (30,588 GRT); 1 auxiliary warship sunk (318 GRT)

SM U-58 (Note: "SM" stands for "Seiner Majestät" (English: His Majesty's) and combined with the U for Unterseeboot would be translated as His Majesty's Submarine.) was one of the 329 submarines serving in the Imperial German Navy in World War I. U-58 was engaged in the naval warfare and took part in the First Battle of the Atlantic.

== Fate ==
The boat was sunk with the loss of two men and the capture of the rest of the crew in the action of 17 November 1917.

== Summary of raiding history ==
Date	Name	Nationality	Tonnage (Note: Tonnages are in gross register tons)	Fate
27 October 1916	Ellen	Sweden	140	Sunk
4 December 1916	Senta	Sweden	1,024	Sunk
5 December 1916	Stettin	Norway	412	Sunk
1 March 1917	Norma	Norway	850	Sunk
25 April 1917	Havila	Denmark	1,421	Sunk
25 April 1917	Hawthornbank	Denmark	1,369	Sunk
25 April 1917	Sokoto	Denmark	2,259	Sunk
27 April 1917	Dromore	United Kingdom	4,398	Sunk
27 April 1917	Langfond	Norway	1,097	Sunk
28 April 1917	Bullmouth	United Kingdom	4,018	Sunk
2 May 1917	Beeswing	United Kingdom	1,462	Sunk
2 May 1917	Dione	Norway	785	Sunk
2 May 1917	Vanduara	Norway	2,079	Sunk
5 May 1917	Asra	Norway	1,975	Sunk
18 June 1917	HMT Bega	Royal Navy	318	Sunk
19 June 1917	Ivigtut	Denmark	456	Sunk
6 July 1917	Motor	Denmark	63	Sunk
8 July 1917	Fiorella	Norway	1,168	Sunk
13 July 1917	Charilaos Tricoupis	Greece	2,475	Sunk
21 July 1917	Ramillies	United Kingdom	2,935	Sunk
14 November 1917	Dolly Warden	United Kingdom	202	Sunk

== Bibliography ==
- Gröner, Erich; Jung, Dieter; Maass, Martin (1991). U-boats and Mine Warfare Vessels. German Warships 1815–1945. Vol. 2. Translated by Thomas, Keith; Magowan, Rachel. London: Conway Maritime Press. ISBN 0-85177-593-4.
