= SM U-87 =

German submarine

Coordinates: 52.85°N 4.98°W

History

German Empire
- Name: U-87
- Ordered: 23 June 1915
- Builder: Kaiserliche Werft Danzig
- Yard number: 31
- Laid down: 28 October 1915
- Launched: 22 May 1916
- Commissioned: 26 February 1917
- Fate: Sunk 25 December 1917

General characteristics
- Class & type: Type U 87 submarine
- Displacement: 757 t (745 long tons) surfaced; 998 t (982 long tons) submerged
- Length: 65.80 m (215 ft 11 in) (o/a); 50.07 m (164 ft 3 in) (pressure hull)
- Beam: 6.20 m (20 ft 4 in) (oa); 4.18 m (13 ft 9 in) (pressure hull)
- Height: 9.35 m (30 ft 8 in)
- Draught: 3.88 m (12 ft 9 in)
- Installed power: 2 × 2,400 PS (1,765 kW; 2,367 shp) surfaced; 2 × 1,200 PS (883 kW; 1,184 shp) submerged
- Propulsion: 2 shafts, 2 × 1.66 m (5 ft 5 in) propellers
- Speed: 15.6 knots (28.9 km/h; 18.0 mph) surfaced; 8.6 knots (15.9 km/h; 9.9 mph) submerged
- Range: 11,380 nmi (21,080 km; 13,100 mi) at 8 knots (15 km/h; 9.2 mph) surfaced; 56 nmi (104 km; 64 mi) at 5 knots (9.3 km/h; 5.8 mph) submerged
- Test depth: 50 m (160 ft)
- Complement: 4 officers, 32 enlisted
- Armament: 4 × 50 cm (19.7 in) torpedo tubes (two bow, two stern); 10-12 torpedoes; 1 × 10.5 cm (4.1 in) SK L/45 deck gun; 1 × 8.8 cm (3.5 in) SK L/30 deck gun

Service record
- Part of: III Flotilla; 24 April – 25 December 1917
- Commanders: Kptlt. Rudolf Schneider; 26 February – 13 October 1917; Kptlt. Freiherr Rudolf von Speth-Schülzburg; 13 October – 25 December 1917
- Operations: 5 patrols
- Victories: 22 merchant ships sunk (59,828 GRT); 2 merchant ships damaged (7,638 GRT)

SM U-87 (Note: "SM" stands for "Seiner Majestät" (English: His Majesty's) and combined with the U for Unterseeboot would be translated as His Majesty's Submarine.) was one of the 329 submarines serving in the Imperial German Navy (Kaiserliche Marine) in World War I. U-87 was engaged in the naval warfare and took part in the First Battle of the Atlantic. She sank some 22 merchant vessels before 25 December 1917, when HMS Buttercup rammed U-87 in the Irish Sea and depth-charged her. Then the P-class sloop P.56 sank her. U-87's entire crew of 44 were lost.

== Design ==
Type U 87 submarines were preceded by the shorter Type U 81 submarines. The first of its type, U-87 had a displacement of 757 tonnes (745 long tons) when at the surface and 998 tonnes (982 long tons) while submerged. She had a total length of 65.80 m (215 ft 11 in), a pressure hull length of 50.07 m (164 ft 3 in), a beam of 6.20 m (20 ft 4 in), a height of 9.35 m (30 ft 8 in), and a draught of 3.88 m (12 ft 9 in). The submarine was powered by two 2,400 metric horsepower (1,800 kW; 2,400 shp) engines for use while surfaced, and two 1,200 metric horsepower (880 kW; 1,200 shp) engines for use while submerged. She had two propeller shafts. She was capable of operating at depths of up to 50 metres (160 ft).

The submarine had a maximum surface speed of 15.6 knots (28.9 km/h; 18.0 mph) and a maximum submerged speed of 8.6 knots (15.9 km/h; 9.9 mph). When submerged, she could operate for 56 nautical miles (104 km; 64 mi) at 5 knots (9.3 km/h; 5.8 mph); when surfaced, she could travel 11,380 nautical miles (21,080 km; 13,100 mi) at 8 knots (15 km/h; 9.2 mph). U-87 was fitted with four 50 centimetres (20 in) torpedo tubes (two at the bow and two at the stern), ten to twelve torpedoes, one 10.5 cm (4.1 in) SK L/45 deck gun, and one 8.8 cm (3.5 in) SK L/30 deck gun. She had a complement of thirty-six (thirty-two crew members and four officers).

== Summary of raiding history ==
Date	Name	Nationality	Tonnage (Note: Tonnages are in gross register tons)	Fate
23 May 1917	Bernisse	Netherlands	951	Damaged
23 May 1917	Elve	Netherlands	962	Sunk
26 May 1917	Lucipara	Russia	1,943	Sunk
26 May 1917	Saint Mirren	United Kingdom	1,956	Sunk
30 May 1917	Bathurst	United Kingdom	2,821	Sunk
30 May 1917	Hanley	United Kingdom	3,331	Sunk
2 June 1917	Eliofilo	Italy	3,583	Sunk
2 June 1917	Mississippi	France	6,687	Damaged
4 July 1917	Loch Katrine	United Kingdom	151	Sunk
8 July 1917	Valetta	United Kingdom	5,871	Sunk
10 July 1917	Seang Choon	United Kingdom	5,807	Sunk
11 July 1917	Kioto	United Kingdom	6,182	Sunk
12 July 1917	Castleton	United Kingdom	2,395	Sunk
16 July 1917	Tamele	United Kingdom	3,932	Sunk
19 July 1917	Artensis	Norway	1,788	Sunk
21 July 1917	Coniston Water	United Kingdom	3,738	Sunk
19 August 1917	Eika II	Norway	1,268	Sunk
21 August 1917	Oslo	United Kingdom	2,296	Sunk
22 August 1917	Alexander Shukoff	Denmark	1,652	Sunk
27 August 1917	Anna	Denmark	1,211	Sunk
27 August 1917	Aurora	Denmark	768	Sunk
13 December 1917	Little Gem	United Kingdom	114	Sunk
24 December 1917	Daybreak	United Kingdom	3,238	Sunk
25 December 1917	Agberi	United Kingdom	4,821	Sunk

== Fate and discovery ==
In August 2017, researchers from Bangor University in Wales announced they had discovered the sunken wreck of U-87 while conducting multibeam surveys 10 miles northwest of Bardsey Island as part of the marine renewable energy SEACAMS 2 project. Detailed sonar images reveal the wreck to be lying in one piece with what appears to be a large area of damage near the conning tower, presumably caused by in the ramming collision by Buttercup

== Bibliography ==
- Gröner, Erich; Jung, Dieter; Maass, Martin (1991). U-boats and Mine Warfare Vessels. German Warships 1815–1945. Vol. 2. Translated by Thomas, Keith; Magowan, Rachel. London: Conway Maritime Press. ISBN 0-85177-593-4.
