= HMS Ariadne (1898) =

Ship, 1898

Coordinates: 50.655°N 0.291°E

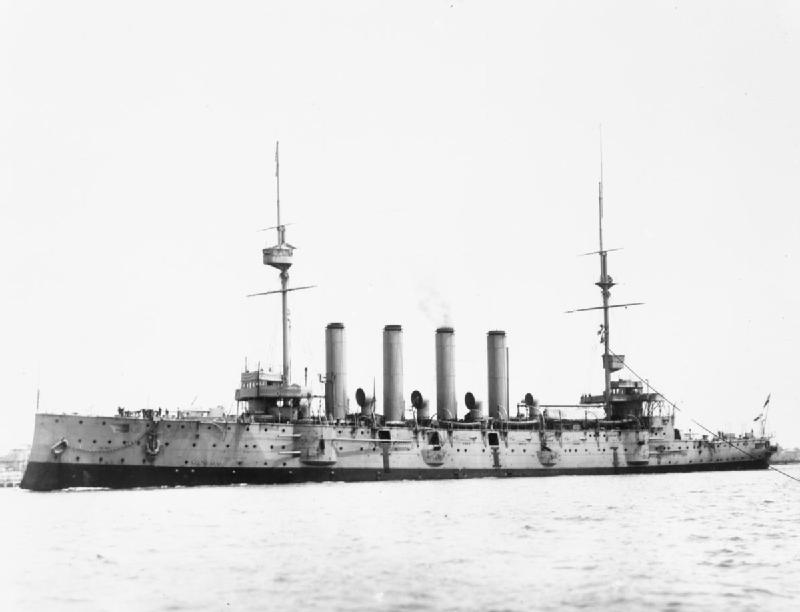
- HMS Ariadne

History

United Kingdom
- Name: HMS Ariadne
- Builder: J&G Thompson, Clydebank
- Laid down: 29 October 1896
- Launched: 22 April 1898
- Christened: Lady Balfour of Burleigh
- Reclassified: Minelayer, March 1917
- Fate: Sunk 26 July 1917

General characteristics
- Class & type: Diadem-class protected cruiser
- Displacement: 11,000 long tons (11,177 t)
- Length: 435 ft (133 m); (462 ft 6 in (140.97 m) o/a)
- Beam: 69 ft (21 m)
- Draught: 25 ft 6 in (7.77 m)
- Installed power: 16,500–18,000 ihp (12,300–13,400 kW)
- Propulsion: 2 × triple expansion engines; 2 × shafts
- Speed: 20–20.5 knots (37.0–38.0 km/h; 23.0–23.6 mph)
- Complement: 760
- Armament: Original: 16 × QF 6-inch (152 mm) guns; 14 × QF 12-pounder (76 mm) guns; 3 × QF 3-pounder (47 mm) guns; 2 × 18-inch (450-mm) torpedo tubes; As Minelayer: 4 × 6 in (150 mm) guns, 1 × 12-pounder gun, 354 mines
- Armour: Casemates: 6 in (15 cm); Deck: 2–4.5 in (5.1–11.4 cm)

HMS Ariadne was a Diadem-class protected cruiser of the Royal Navy, which was launched in 1898, In March 1913, she was converted to a stokers' training ship and in 1917 was converted to a minelayer and assigned to the Nore Command. She was torpedoed and sunk off Beachy Head by the German submarine UC-65 (Otto Steinbrinck) on 26 July 1917.

== Service history ==
Ariadne was built by J&G Thompson of Clydebank and launched on 22 April 1898, when she was named by Lady Balfour of Burleigh, wife of Lord Balfour of Burleigh, who served as Secretary of State for Scotland. She arrived at Portsmouth from Chatham Dockyard in March 1900, and was placed in the Fleet reserve.

== North Atlantic service ==
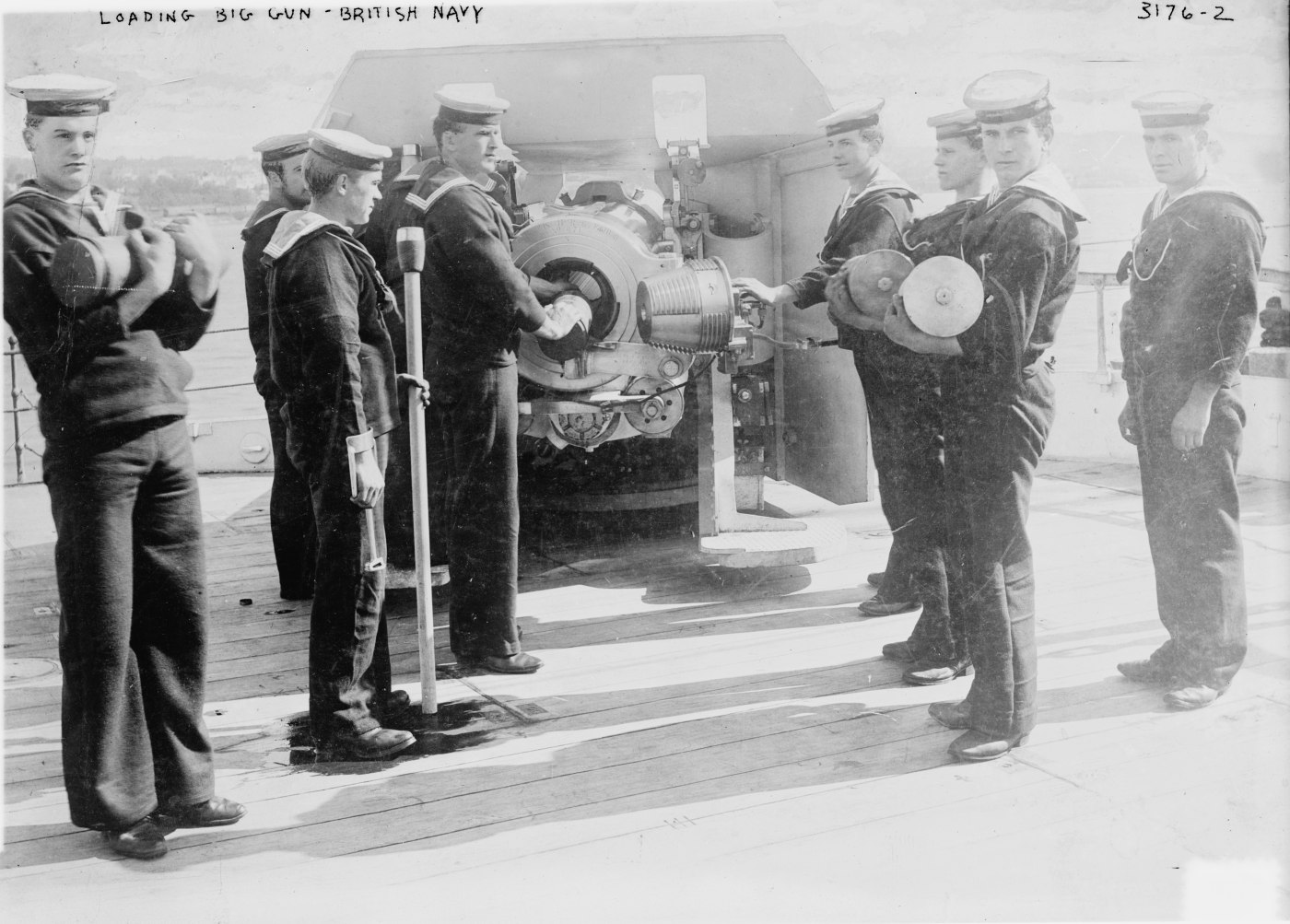
Sailors pose while loading a 6-inch (152 mm) gun aboard Ariadne ca. 1903. The gun's breech is open, and sailors are holding the rammer, projectile, and propellant casings.

In March 1902 she was ordered to prepare for service on the North America and West Indies Station, where she would act as flagship to Vice-Admiral Sir Archibald L. Douglas when he took up command on the station in July that year. She was commissioned at Portsmouth on 5 June 1902 by Captain Montague Browning, who was appointed flag captain in command of the ship from the same day. Leaving Portsmouth in early July, she arrived at the station headquarters at Halifax and formally succeed HMS Crescent as flagship to the station on 15 July. In August–September 1902 she visited St. John's, Newfoundland, Quebec City and Charlottetown. In November the same year, she visited the Bermuda headquarters of the station and Trinidad.

Ariadne took part in the naval blockade of Venezuelan ports during the Venezuelan crisis of 1902–1903. Following the end of the blockade, she left Trinidad for Grenada in late February 1903, then visited Saint Vincent, Saint Lucia, Dominica, Antigua, Saint Kitts, Jamaica, and Havana, Cuba before returning to the Bermuda headquarters in late March 1903.
