= RMS Salsette =

P&O ocean liner and mail ship

Coordinates: 50°29.67′N 2°43.07′W

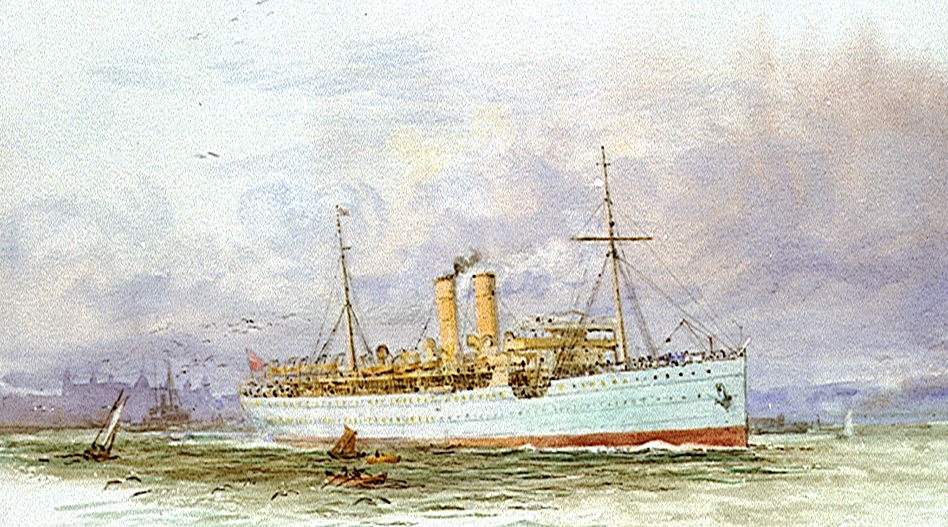

History
- Name: Salsette
- Namesake: Salsette Island
- Owner: P&O
- Port of registry: (United Kingdom) Greenock
- Route: Aden – Bombay (1908–1915)
- Builder: Caird & Company, Greenock
- Yard number: 314
- Launched: 2 April 1908
- Identification: Official Number 127538
- Fate: Sunk by torpedo, 20 July 1917

General characteristics
- Type: Ocean liner
- Tonnage: 5,842 GRT
- Length: 440 feet (130 m) (pp)
- Beam: 53 feet (16 m)
- Installed power: 10,000 indicated horsepower (7,500 kW)
- Speed: 21 knots (39 km/h; 24 mph)

RMS Salsette was a P&O ocean liner built by Caird & Company at Greenock on the River Clyde. She was launched in 1908 and used by P&O on their Aden to Bombay service. In 1916–1917, during World War I, she temporarily replaced the torpedoed RMS Arabia on the Australian mail service.

== Sinking ==
On 20 July 1917, Salsette embarked from London en route to Sydney via Alexandria, Aden, and Bombay. She was carrying a substantial payroll for British troops based in Egypt. 15 miles (24 km) southwest of Portland Bill, she was torpedoed and sunk by the German submarine UB-40. Fifteen crew members, all lascars, were killed because they were trapped in the engine room. They comprised ten firemen, four trimmers and one tindal. Salsette had ignored instructions to hug the coastline, and instead was cutting across Lyme Bay when attacked.

Salsette's captain at the time was the Scottish polar explorer Albert Armitage. He was the last person to leave the ship and reported that it nosedived fifty minutes after the torpedo struck. All the passengers had been safely loaded into lifeboats. The survivors were picked up twenty minutes after Salsette sank and taken to Weymouth.

== Wreck ==
The wreck of Salsette lies on its port side at 45 degrees and a depth of 43 metres (141 ft) in Lyme Bay. First discovered in the 1970s, it has been described as the "best wreck dive in Britain."

Most of the upper-deck superstructure has collapsed, but the hull remains largely intact. When the war began, the ship was fitted with a defensive 4.7-inch (120 mm) gun and that is still housed in the stern. The wreck has a large number of portholes that facilitate diving as well as the torpedo hole, which is on the starboard side amidships and near the boiler rooms. Below the main deck are two more with cabins which are accessible to divers entering via the torpedo hole. On the main deck itself is a collapsed mast which lies to the port side. Divers have observed various types of marine life in the wreck, especially pouting, pollock and conger eels.

== In popular culture ==
- Murder on the Salsette is a 'whodunnit' novel set aboard Salsette, by Keith Miles, writing as Conrad Allen, and published in 2005 by Allison & Busby, London (later republished with pen-name Edward Marston).

== Sources ==
- "Launches and Trial Trips: Launches—Scotch". The Marine Engineer and Naval Architect. Vol. XXX. May 1908.
- Monograph No. 35: Home Waters Part IX: 1st May 1917 to 31st July 1917 (PDF). Naval Staff Monographs (Historical). Vol. XIX. Naval Staff, Training and Staff Duties Division. 1939. Archived from the original (PDF) on 25 October 2023.
