= USS Saxis =

1917 US patrol vessel

History

United States
- Name: USS Saxis
- Namesake: Previous name retained
- Builder: Thomas Scott
- Acquired: 5 May 1917
- Fate: Wrecked 7 July 1917
- Notes: Operated as civilian motorboat Saxis until 1917

General characteristics
- Type: Patrol vessel
- Length: 48 ft 0 in (14.63 m)
- Beam: 10 ft 6 in (3.20 m)
- Draft: 2 ft 6.25 in (0.7684 m) mean
- Speed: 10 knots
- Armament: 1 × 1-pounder gun

USS Saxis (SP-615) was a United States Navy patrol vessel in commission during 1917.

Saxis was built as a civilian motorboat of the same name by Thomas Scott. On 5 May 1917, the U.S. Navy acquired her from the Virginia Fish Commission for use as a section patrol boat during World War I. Saxis was wrecked when she became stranded at West Point, Virginia, on 7 July 1917.

Presumably Saxis was commissioned as USS Saxis (SP-615) sometime between her acquisition and loss, but one source states without further explanation that Saxis may have been wrecked before seeing any actual U.S. Navy service.
