= List of shipwrecks in November 1917 =

The list of shipwrecks in November 1917 includes ships sunk, foundered, grounded, or otherwise lost during November 1917.

== 1 November ==
List of shipwrecks: 1 November 1917
Ship	State	Description
Al-Ki	United States	The 201-foot (61.3 m) steamer was wrecked without loss of life at Point Augusta (58°02′N 134°57′W) in Southeast Alaska, 26 nautical miles (48 km; 30 mi) southwest of Juneau, Territory of Alaska. The cargo liner Mariposa (United States) rescued her entire crew. Shortly after Mariposa left the scene, the steamer Manhattan (United States) arrived, and her crew looted the wreck of Al-Ki.
Churchill	United States	The schooner was wrecked on the French Frigate Shoals, in the Pacific Ocean north west of Hawaii.
Falk	Norway	The cargo ship collided with another vessel and sank. Her crew were rescued.
Margam Abbey	United Kingdom	World War I: The cargo ship was torpedoed and damaged in the Mediterranean Sea (37°12′N 6°22′E) by SM UB-50 (Imperial German Navy) with the loss of two of her crew. She was beached at Collo, Algeria but was a total loss.
Marigo	Italy	World War I: The sailing vessel was sunk in the Mediterranean Sea off Crete, Greece (35°30′N 25°43′E) by SM UC-37 (Imperial German Navy).
Ruby	United States	With no one on board, the 12-gross register ton, 35-foot (10.7 m) fishing vessel sank at Wrangell, Territory of Alaska.
SM UC-63	Imperial German Navy	World War I: The Type UC II submarine was torpedoed and sunk off the Goodwin Sands, southern North Sea (51°23′N 2°00′E) by HMS E52 (Royal Navy) with the loss of all-but-one of her 27 crew.
Westmann	Denmark	The schooner was wrecked in the Vestmannaeyjar, Iceland. Her crew were rescued.
White Bear	United States	During a voyage from Solomon to Nome, Territory of Alaska, with three crewmen and one passenger aboard, the 10-gross register ton, 39-foot (11.9 m) passenger vessel became frozen in ice in Pastol Bay off the coast of Alaska and was lost. All on board survived.
Alva B.	United States	The tugboat foundered in Lake Erie during a gale. The captain and all crew were rescued.

== 2 November ==
List of shipwrecks: 2 November 1917
Ship	State	Description
Acary	Brazil	World War I: The cargo ship was torpedoed and damaged at São Vicente, Cape Verde Islands, Portugal by SM U-151 (Imperial German Navy). She was beached but was declared a constructive total loss.
Bur	Sweden	World War I: The cargo ship was torpedoed and sunk in the North Sea whilst in convoy 3 nautical miles (5.6 km) east of the Spurn Lightship (United Kingdom) by SM UB-35 (Imperial German Navy) with the loss of two of her crew.
Cape Finisterre	United Kingdom	World War I: The cargo ship was torpedoed and sunk in the English Channel 1 nautical mile (1.9 km) south south east of The Manacles, Cornwall (50°02′N 5°01′W) by SM UC-17 (Imperial German Navy) with the loss of 35 of her crew.
HM CMB-11	Royal Navy	The Coastal Motor Boat was lost on this date.
Farraline	United Kingdom	World War I: The cargo ship was torpedoed and sunk in the English Channel 15 nautical miles (28 km) north east of Ouessant, Finistère, France (48°40′N 4°55′W) by SM UC-69 (Imperial German Navy) with the loss of a crew member.
Guahyba	Brazil	World War I: The cargo ship was sunk of São Vicente, Cape Verde Islands by SM U-151 (Imperial German Navy).
Jessie	United Kingdom	World War I: The cargo ship was shelled and damaged in the North Sea 3 nautical miles (5.6 km) north east of Flamborough Head, Yorkshire by SM UB-35 (Imperial German Navy) with the loss of four of her crew. She was beached but was declared a total loss.
Kronprinz Wilhelm (K)	Imperial German Navy	World War I: The decoy vessel was sunk in the Kattegat by Royal Navy destroyers.
Maria di Porto Salvo	Italy	World War I: The sailing vessel was sunk in the Mediterranean Sea south of Sardinia by SM U-35 (Imperial German Navy).
Rochester	United States	World War I: The cargo ship was sunk in the Atlantic Ocean 300 nautical miles (560 km) west of Tory Island, County Donegal, United Kingdom (55°17′N 17°44′W) by SM U-95 (Imperial German Navy) with the loss of 23 of her crew.
San Francesco di Paola G.	Italy	World War I: The sailing vessel was sunk in the Mediterranean Sea south of Sardinia by SM U-35 (Imperial German Navy). Her crew survived.

== 3 November ==
List of shipwrecks: 3 November 1917
Ship	State	Description
HMT Deliverer	Royal Navy	World War I: The naval trawler struck a mine and sank in the Irish Sea off the Bailey Lighthouse, Howth, County Dublin with the loss of all hands.
Essichia	Greece	World War I: The sailing vessel was sunk in the Mediterranean Sea east of Crete (35°53′N 27°25′E) by SM UC-37 (Imperial German Navy).
Nefeli	Greece	World War I: The cargo ship was sunk in the Mediterranean Sea west of Crete (34°57′N 22°16′E) by SM UC-38 (Imperial German Navy).
SM UC-65	Imperial German Navy	World War I: The Type UC II submarine was torpedoed and sunk in the North Sea (50°31′N 0°27′E) by HMS C15 (Royal Navy) with the loss of all 26 crew.

== 4 November ==
List of shipwrecks: 4 November 1917
Ship	State	Description
Antaeus	United Kingdom	World War I: The cargo ship was torpedoed and sunk in the Mediterranean Sea 42 nautical miles (78 km) north by west of Cape Bon, Algeria by SM UB-50 (Imperial German Navy). Her crew survived, but her captain was taken as a prisoner of war.
Border Knight	United Kingdom	World War I: The cargo ship was torpedoed and sunk in the English Channel 1.5 nautical miles (2.8 km) east south east of The Lizard, Cornwall (49°58′N 5°09′W) by SM UC-17 (Imperial German Navy) with the loss of a crew member.
USS Empress	United States Navy	The barge's seams opened up and she sank.
SMS G37	Imperial German Navy	World War I: The Großes Torpedoboot 1913-class torpedo boat struck a mine and sank in the North Sea off Walcheren, Zeeland, Netherlands with the loss of four of her 83 crew.
Gimle	Norway	World War I: The cargo ship was sunk in the North Sea 4 nautical miles (7.4 km) south east of Scarborough, Yorkshire, United Kingdom by SM UB-35 (Imperial German Navy) with the loss of a crew member.
Irina	Russia	World War I: The cargo ship was sunk in the Barents Sea east of the Kola Peninsula by SM U-46 (Imperial German Navy). Her crew survived.
Longwy	France	World War I: The cargo ship was torpedoed and sunk in the Irish Sea 8 nautical miles (15 km) east of the Copeland Islands, County Down, United Kingdom (55°20′N 5°10′W) by SM UC-75 (Imperial German Navy) with the loss of 38 of her crew.
Lyra	Norway	World War I: The cargo ship struck a mine and sank in the North Sea 8 nautical miles (15 km) north east of Spurn Point, Yorkshire, United Kingdom. Her crew survived.

== 5 November ==
List of shipwrecks: 5 November 1917
Ship	State	Description
USS Alcedo	United States Navy	World War I: The naval yacht was torpedoed and sunk in the Bay of Biscay (47°23′N 4°44′W) by UC-71 (Imperial German Navy) with the loss of 21 of her 94 crew.
Amberton	United Kingdom	World War I: The cargo ship was torpedoed and damaged in the Mediterranean Sea north of Cape Bon, Algeria (37°19′N 8°41′E) by SM UB-50 (Imperial German Navy). She was beached at La Calle and was not refloated until December 1919.
Caterina	Italy	World War I: The sailing vessel was sunk in the Mediterranean Sea off Crete, Greece (35°44′N 27°22′E) by SM UC-37 (Imperial German Navy).
Hilda R.	United Kingdom	World War I: The schooner was shelled and sunk in the Atlantic Ocean south east of Cape St. Vincent, Portugal by SM U-63 (Imperial German Navy) with the loss of one of her six crew. Three survivors reached land in their lifeboat, the other two were rescued by SM U-63.
Kai	Denmark	World War I: The cargo ship was scuttled in the Atlantic Ocean south east of Cape St. Vincent (36°22′N 8°03′W) by SM U-63 (Imperial German Navy). Her crew survived.

== 6 November ==
List of shipwrecks: 6 November 1917
Ship	State	Description
Benor	Russia	World War I: The sailing vessel was sunk in the Atlantic Ocean south of Ireland by SM UB-62 (Imperial German Navy).
Emil	Sweden	The wooden brig was last heard from departing West Hartlepool bound for Uddevalla. Swedish official history on war losses put the likely cause as being a drifting mine, many of which were reported at this time. Eight casualties.
Hitachi Maru	Japan	World War I: The steamer, captured on 23 September with 14 crew killed and 6 wounded, near the Maldive Islands by SMS Wolf (Imperial German Navy), was scuttled in an unknown location. Her captain later committed suicide.
HMS Peveril	Royal Navy	World War I: Convoy OF 10: The Q-ship was sunk in the Atlantic Ocean (35°44′N 6°48′W) by SM U-63 (Imperial German Navy) with the loss of a crew member.

== 7 November ==
List of shipwrecks: 7 November 1917
Ship	State	Description
Obj	Norway	World War I: The cargo ship was sunk in the Barents Sea 100 nautical miles (190 km) north east of Vardø, Finnmark by SM U-46 (Imperial German Navy) with the loss of all 24 crew.
Padus	Regia Marina	The Padus-class monitor ran aground and sank in the Adriatic Sea off Caorle, Venice.
Suntrap	United Kingdom	World War I: The cargo ship was torpedoed and sunk in the North Sea 2.5 nautical miles (4.6 km) off Robin Hood's Bay, Yorkshire by SM UB-22 (Imperial German Navy). Her crew survived.
Villemer	United States	World War I: The cargo ship was sunk in the Mediterranean Sea by SM UC-38 (Imperial German Navy) with the loss of two of her crew.

== 8 November ==
List of shipwrecks: 8 November 1917
Ship	State	Description
Lindhardt	Denmark	World War I: The schooner was sunk in the North Sea (60°18′N 4°13′E) by SM UB-63 (Imperial German Navy). Her crew survived.
The Marquis	United Kingdom	World War I: The coaster was shelled and sunk in the Irish Sea 16 nautical miles (30 km) east south east of Rockabill, County Dublin by SM UC-75 (Imperial German Navy). Her ten crew were rescued by Sarah Blanche (Isle of Man).

== 9 November ==
List of shipwrecks: 9 November 1917
Ship	State	Description
Ardglamis	United Kingdom	World War I: The cargo ship was torpedoed and sunk in the Atlantic Ocean 125 nautical miles (232 km) west of Cape Spartel, Morocco (35°18′N 8°43′W) by SM U-63 (Imperial German Navy). Her crew survived.
Ballogie	United Kingdom	World War I: The cargo ship was torpedoed and sunk in the North Sea 1.5 nautical miles (2.8 km) north east of Filey, Yorkshire by SM UC-47 (Imperial German Navy) with the loss of 13 of her crew.
Frithjof Eide	Norway	World War I: The cargo ship was sunk in the North Sea 3.5 nautical miles (6.5 km) east north east of Flamborough Head, Yorkshire by SM UB-75 (Imperial German Navy) with the loss of eleven of her crew.
Isabelle	France	World War I: The cargo ship was torpedoed and sunk in the North Sea 3 nautical miles (5.6 km) north west of Flamborough Head (54°13′N 0°13′W) by SM UC-47 (Imperial German Navy) with the loss of six of her crew.
Rizal	United States	World War I: The cargo ship was sunk in the Mediterranean Sea 9 nautical miles (17 km) off Cape Cavallo, Jijel, Algeria (36°53′N 5°30′E) by SM UB-50 (Imperial German Navy). Her crew survived.

== 10 November ==
List of shipwrecks: 10 November 1917
Ship	State	Description
Lapwing	United Kingdom	World War I: The schooner was shelled and sunk in St. George's Channel by SM U-95 (Imperial German Navy). Her five crew took to the lifeboats but were not rescued.

== 11 November ==
List of shipwrecks: 11 November 1917
Ship	State	Description
Dana	Sweden	World War I: The cargo ship was torpedoed and sunk with the loss of eight of her crew in the North Sea off Flamborough Head, Yorkshire, United Kingdom by SM UC-47 (Imperial German Navy)
Lapwing	United Kingdom	World War I: The cargo ship struck a mine and sank in the North Sea 9 nautical miles (17 km) south east of Southwold, Suffolk (52°15′30″N 2°00′00″E). Her crew survived.
HMS M15	Royal Navy	World War I: The M15-class monitor was torpedoed and sunk in the Mediterranean Sea off Deir el Belah, Occupied Palestine by SM UC-38 (Imperial German Navy) with the loss of 26 of her 69 crew.
Quickstep	United States	The schooner was wrecked at Bacuranao, Cuba. Her crew were rescued.
HMS Staunch	Royal Navy	World War I: The Acorn-class destroyer was torpedoed and sunk in the Mediterranean Sea off Deir el Belah by SM UC-38 (Imperial German Navy) with the loss of eight of her 72 crew.
HMT Thuringia	Royal Navy	World War I: The naval trawler was torpedoed and sunk in the Atlantic Ocean off Youghal, County Cork by SM U-95 (Imperial German Navy) with the loss of fourteen of her crew.

== 12 November ==
List of shipwrecks: 12 November 1917
Ship	State	Description
Anteo	Italy	World War I: The cargo ship struck a mine and sank in the Tyrrhenian Sea off Livorno, Tuscany. Her crew survived.
Barbary	United Kingdom	World War I: The cargo ship was torpedoed and sunk in the Mediterranean Sea 56 nautical miles (104 km) north west of Port Said, Egypt by SM UC-34 (Imperial German Navy) with the loss of three of her crew.
USS Don Juan de Austria	United States Navy	The Gunboat, a former Spanish Velasco class unprotected cruiser, went ashore near Woods Hole, Massachusetts. Refloated and returned to service.
Huibertje	Netherlands	World War I: The fishing vessel was scuttled in the North Sea 25 nautical miles (46 km) off the Dutch coast by SM UC-47 (Imperial German Navy) with the loss of a crew member.
Morning Star	United Kingdom	World War I: The coaster was scuttled in the English Channel 10 nautical miles (19 km) south east by east of Barfleur, Manche, France by SM UB-30 (Imperial German Navy). Her crew survived.

== 13 November ==
List of shipwrecks: 13 November 1917
Ship	State	Description
Amelie	Belgium	World War I: The cargo ship was sunk in the English Channel 7 nautical miles (13 km) south west of Start Point, Devon, United Kingdom (50°09′N 3°48′W) by SM UC-31 (Imperial German Navy). Her crew survived.
Ardmore	United Kingdom	World War I: The passenger ship was torpedoed and sunk in St. George's Channel 13 nautical miles (24 km) west south west of the Coningbeg Lightship (United Kingdom) by SM U-95 (Imperial German Navy) with the loss of nineteen of her crew.
Atlas	United Kingdom	World War I: The cargo ship was torpedoed and sunk in the English Channel 5 nautical miles (9.3 km) south of the Owers Lightship (United Kingdom) by SM UB-56 (Imperial German Navy). Her crew survived.
Australbus	Australia	World War I: The cargo ship was torpedoed and sunk in the Atlantic Ocean 7 nautical miles (13 km) east of the Eddystone Lighthouse by SM UC-30 (Imperial German Navy) with the loss of two of her crew.
Axminster	United Kingdom	World War I: The collier struck a mine and sank in the North Sea off Lowestoft, Suffolk (52°26′N 1°48′E) with the loss of three of her crew.
Axwell	United Kingdom	World War I: The cargo ship was torpedoed and sunk in the English Channel 3 nautical miles (5.6 km) west south west of the Owers Lightship (United Kingdom) by SM UB-56 (Imperial German Navy) with the loss of three of her crew.
Carlo	United Kingdom	World War I: The cargo ship was torpedoed and sunk in St. George's Channel 7 nautical miles (13 km) south west by west of the Coningbeg Lightship (United Kingdom) by SM U-95 (Imperial German Navy) with the loss of two of her crew.

== 14 November ==
List of shipwrecks: 14 November 1917
Ship	State	Description
Buenaventura	Spain	World War I: The schooner was shelled and sunk in the Mediterranean Sea south west of Sicily, Italy by SM U-39 (Imperial German Navy).
Dolly Warden	United Kingdom	World War I: The sailing vessel was shelled and sunk in the English Channel north west of Le Tréport, Seine-Inférieure, France by SM U-58 (Imperial German Navy). Her crew survived.
HMT John Mitchell	Royal Navy	The naval trawler collided with another vessel and sank in the English Channel off the Isle of Wight.
Panaghia	Greece	World War I: The sailing vessel was sunk in the Mediterranean Sea (34°41′N 25°55′E) by SM UC-38 (Imperial German Navy).
Panormitis	Greece	World War I: The sailing vessel was sunk in the Mediterranean Sea off Serapitra (34°53′N 25°48′E) by SM UC-38 (Imperial German Navy).
Prophet	United Kingdom	World War I: The collier was torpedoed and sunk in the Aegean Sea 3 nautical miles (5.6 km) south east of Antikythera, Greece (35°47′N 23°22′E) by SM UC-74 (Imperial German Navy). Her crew survived.
Trowbridge	United Kingdom	World War I: The collier was torpedoed and sunk in the Mediterranean Sea 12 nautical miles (22 km) south east of Cabo De Gata, Almeria, Spain by SM U-63 (Imperial German Navy). Her crew survived.

== 15 November ==
List of shipwrecks: 15 November 1917
Ship	State	Description
De Dollart	Netherlands	World War I: The auxiliary sailing vessel was sunk by gunfire in the Atlantic Ocean southwest of Vigo, Spain, by the submarine SM U-82 (Imperial German Navy) with the loss of three of her crew.
Manhattan	United States	The 291-gross register ton steam halibut-fishing vessel was wrecked on an uncharted rock during a gale and snowstorm in the Gulf of Alaska off Lituya Bay on the coast of Southeast Alaska. Her crew of 34 abandoned ship in dories and was rescued 30 hours later by the steam cargo liner Mariposa (United States). Trappers reported finding her boiler on the beach at Lituya Bay in 1932, but it soon was covered by sand.

== 16 November ==
List of shipwrecks: 16 November 1917
Ship	State	Description
Alfredo Cappellini	Regia Marina	The Alfredo Cappellini-class monitor capsized and sank in the Adriatic Sea off Ancona.
Elza Alexander	Belgium	The cargo ship sank after a collision with HMS P18 (Royal Navy) in the English Channel off Le Havre, Seine-Inférieure, France.
Garron Head	United Kingdom	World War I: The cargo ship was torpedoed and sunk in the Bay of Biscay 40 nautical miles (74 km) north by east of Bayonne, Basses-Pyrénées, France (44°13′N 1°29′W) by SM U-103 (Imperial German Navy) with the loss of 28 crew.
Gasconia	United Kingdom	World War I: The collier was torpedoed and sunk in the Mediterranean Sea 12 nautical miles (22 km) north east of Cape Cherchell, Algeria by SM U-63 (Imperial German Navy) with the loss of three crew.
Jules Verne	France	World War I: The sailing vessel struck a mine and sank in the English Channel off Dieppe, Seine-Inférieure.
Kyno	United Kingdom	World War I: The cargo ship was torpedoed and sunk in the Mediterranean Sea 9 nautical miles (17 km) north north east of Cape Cherchell by SM U-63 (Imperial German Navy) with the loss of five crew.
Margaret L. Roberts	United States	World War I: The three-masted schooner was scuttled in the Atlantic Ocean off Madeira, Portugal (33°20′N 19°30′W) by SM U-151 (Imperial German Navy). Her crew survived.
Naalso	French Navy	World War I: the naval trawler struck a mine and sank in the Bay of Biscay 8 nautical miles (15 km) west north west of the Île d'Yeu, Vendée (46°49′N 2°33′W). All eleven crew were rescued by Baron Daviliers (French Navy).

== 17 November ==
List of shipwrecks: 17 November 1917
Ship	State	Description
SMS A50	Imperial German Navy	World War I: The A26-class torpedo boat struck a mine and sank in the North Sea with the loss of eighteen of her crew.
Adolph Andersen	Denmark	World War I: The cargo ship was torpedoed and sunk in the Bay of Biscay 6 nautical miles (11 km) off Brest, Finistère, France (48°30′N 4°55′W) by SM UC-77 (Imperial German Navy) with the loss of a crew member.
USS Chauncey	United States	The Bainbridge-class destroyer collided with Rose (United Kingdom) and sank in the Atlantic Ocean 110 nautical miles (200 km) west of Gibraltar with the loss of 21 of her 91 crew. Survivors were rescued by Rose.
Clan Maccorquodale	United Kingdom	World War I: Convoy HE 1: The cargo ship was torpedoed and sunk in the Mediterranean Sea 165 nautical miles (306 km) north west of Alexandria, Egypt (33°26′N 27°52′E) by SM UB-51 (Imperial German Navy). Her crew survived.
Croxteth Hall	United Kingdom	World War I: The cargo ship struck a mine and sank in the Indian Ocean 25 nautical miles (46 km) west of Bombay, India with the loss of nine of her crew.
SMS Kehdingen	Imperial German Navy	The Vorpostenboot was lost on this date.
Lalen Mendi	Spain	World War I: The cargo ship was sunk in the English Channel 5 nautical miles (9.3 km) south of Beachy Head, Sussex, United Kingdom by SM UB-56 (Imperial German Navy) with the loss of five of her crew.
Modemi	Norway	World War I: The cargo ship was sunk in the North Sea 3 nautical miles (5.6 km) off Whitby, Yorkshire, United Kingdom by SM UC-48 (Imperial German Navy). Her crew survived.
SM U-58	Imperial German Navy	SM U-58 World War I: Action of 17 November 1917: The Type U 57 submarine was depth charged and sunk in the Atlantic Ocean (51°37′N 8°12′W) by USS Fanning and USS Nicholson (both United States Navy) with the loss of two of her 40 crew.
SM UC-51	Imperial German Navy	World War I: The Type UC II submarine struck a mine and sank in the English Channel (50°08′N 3°42′W) with the loss of all 26 crew.
Victoria	United Kingdom	World War I: The coaster was torpedoed and sunk in the Atlantic Ocean 14 nautical miles (26 km) west of the Eddystone Lighthouse by an Imperial German Navy submarine.
Western Coast	United Kingdom	World War I: The collier was torpedoed and sunk in the Atlantic Ocean 10 nautical miles (19 km) west south west of the Eddystone Lighthouse (50°07′N 4°30′W) by SM UB-40 (Imperial German Navy) with the loss of seventeen of her crew.

== 18 November ==
List of shipwrecks: 18 November 1917
Ship	State	Description
Antwerpen	United Kingdom	World War I: The cargo ship was torpedoed and sunk in the Atlantic Ocean 2 nautical miles (3.7 km) south south west of the Runnel Stone (50°06′N 5°31′W) by SM UC-77 (Imperial German Navy). Her crew survived.
HMS Candytuft	Royal Navy	World War I: The Anchusa-class sloop was torpedoed off Bougie, Algeria by SM U-39 (Imperial German Navy). She drifted ashore and sank with the loss of nine crew.
Gisella	United Kingdom	World War I: The collier was torpedoed and sunk in the Irish Sea 2 nautical miles (3.7 km) south west by south of Skokholm, Pembrokeshire by SM UC-77 (Imperial German Navy) with the loss of two of her crew.
HMS K1	Royal Navy	The K-class submarine collided with HMS K4 (Royal Navy) off the coast of Denmark. All 56 crew were rescued by HMS Blonde, which scuttled the ship.
Mariposa	United States	Shortly after departing Shakan on Kosciusko Island in the Alexander Archipelago in Southeast Alaska carrying 265 passengers – including survivors of the steamers Al-Ki and Manhattan (both United States) which she had rescued earlier in the month – and a cargo of 25,000 cases of salmon and 1,200 tons of copper ore, the 3,158-gross register ton, 314-foot (95.7 m) cargo liner ran aground on a reef – thereafter known as Mariposa Reef (56°22′45″N 133°42′00″W). All on board were rescued by the vessels Curacao, Jefferson, and Ravalli (flags unknown). After 6 hours 38 minutes on the reef, Mariposa slid off and sank in deep water. Cargo and machinery was salvaged later.
HMS Marsa	Royal Navy	The auxiliary minesweeper collided with another vessel and sank off Harwich, Essex.
Newa	Imperial German Navy	The transport was on passage between Kuressaare, Saaremaa and Liepāja when she struck and mine and sunk at 57°44′N 22°09′E. Over 139 killed.(Note: Gröner et al has the sinking on 19 November).
SM UC-47	Imperial German Navy	World War I: The Type UC II submarine was depth charged, rammed and sunk in the North Sea off Flamborough Head, Yorkshire, United Kingdom by the patrol craft PC-57 (Royal Navy) with the loss of all 26 crew.
SM UC-57	Imperial German Navy	World War I: The Type UC II submarine departed Hamnskär, Finland. No further trace, believed struck a mine and sank in the Baltic Sea with the loss of all 26 crew.

== 19 November ==
List of shipwrecks: 19 November 1917
Ship	State	Description
Amiral Zede	France	World War I: The cargo ship was torpedoed and sunk in the Irish Sea 22 nautical miles (41 km) south east of Carnsore Point, County Wexford, United Kingdom (52°01′N 6°06′W) by SM UC-77 (Imperial German Navy) with the loss of a crew member. Survivors were rescued by Clangula (United Kingdom) and landed at Milford Haven, Pembrokeshire, United Kingdom.
Aparima	United Kingdom	World War I: The cargo ship was torpedoed and sunk in the English Channel 6 nautical miles (11 km) south west by west of Anvil Point, Dorset (50°29′N 1°55′W) by SM UB-40 (Imperial German Navy) with the loss of 57 lives.
USS Chauncey	United States Navy	The Bainbridge-class destroyer sank in a collision with Rose (United Kingdom) 110 miles (180 km) west of Gibraltar at 35°22′N 30°15′W. 21 killed–3 officers and 18 men.
Clangula	United Kingdom	World War I: The cargo ship was torpedoed and sunk in the Atlantic Ocean 4 nautical miles (7.4 km) south west by west of Hartland Point, Devon by SM UC-77 (Imperial German Navy) with the loss of fifteen of her crew.
Farn	United Kingdom	World War I: The cargo ship was torpedoed and sunk in the English Channel 5 nautical miles (9.3 km) east by north of Start Point, Devon by SM UB-31 (Imperial German Navy). Her crew survived.
Jutland	United Kingdom	World War I: The cargo ship was torpedoed and sunk in the English Channel 18 nautical miles (33 km) north east by north of Ouessant, Finistère, France (48°46′N 4°55′W) by SM UC-79 (Imperial German Navy) with the loss of 26 of her crew.
SMS M55	Imperial German Navy	World War I: The Type 1915 minesweeper was shelled and damaged by Royal Navy ships on an unknown date and beached. She was refloated and sank under tow in the North Sea on this date.
Minnie Coles	United Kingdom	World War I: The schooner was scuttled in the English Channel 30 nautical miles (56 km) north west by north of the Les Hanois Lighthouse, Guernsey, Channel Islands by SM UB-58 (Imperial German Navy). Her crew survived.
HMT Morococala	Royal Navy	World War I: The naval trawler struck a mine and sank in the Irish Sea 3 nautical miles (5.6 km) south east by south of the Daunt Rock Lightship (United Kingdom) with the loss of twelve of her crew.
HMT Newbridge	Royal Navy	The 125.7-foot (38.3 m), 228-ton minesweeping naval trawler was damaged in a collision with Macoris off Prawle Point just before Midnight on 18 November. Taken under tow but sank 4 hours later on 19 November (50°10′N 3°45′W).
Robert Brown	United Kingdom	World War I: The schooner was scuttled in the Bristol Channel 15 nautical miles (28 km) west north west of Lundy Island, Devon by SM UC-77 (Imperial German Navy). Her crew survived.
Saint André	France	World War I: The cargo ship was torpedoed and sunk in the Atlantic Ocean south west of the Eddystone Lighthouse by SM UB-58 (Imperial German Navy).

== 20 November ==
List of shipwrecks: 20 November 1917
Ship	State	Description
Commendatore Carlo Bruno	Italy	World War I: The coaster was sunk in the Mediterranean Sea off Cape Spartivento, Sardinia (38°21′N 8°41′E) by SM U-63 (Imperial German Navy). Her crew survived.
Megrez	Netherlands	World War I: The cargo ship was sunk in the North Sea 10 nautical miles (19 km) west of the Noord Hinder Lightship (Netherlands) by SM U-53 (Imperial German Navy).
Nederland	Netherlands	World War I: The cargo ship was shelled and sunk in the North Sea 9 nautical miles (17 km) off the Noord Hinder Lightship (Netherlands) by SM U-53 (Imperial German Navy).
Robert Morris	United Kingdom	World War I: The schooner was scuttled in the Atlantic Ocean 155 nautical miles (287 km) west south west of the Bishop Rock, Isles of Scilly by SM U-90 (Imperial German Navy). Her crew survived.

== 21 November ==
List of shipwrecks: 21 November 1917
Ship	State	Description
Aros Castle	United Kingdom	World War I: The cargo ship was torpedoed and sunk in the Atlantic Ocean 300 nautical miles (560 km) west by south of the Bishop Rock, Isles of Scilly by SM U-90 (Imperial German Navy) with the loss of two of its crew.
Bilbster	United Kingdom	The collier was lost in the Atlantic Ocean on this date.
Maine	France	World War I: The ship was sunk in the English Channel 30 nautical miles (56 km) off Newhaven, Sussex, United Kingdom by SM UB-56 (Imperial German Navy). Its crew survived.
Mossoul	France	World War I: The cargo ship was torpedoed and damaged in the Mediterranean Sea (37°04′N 11°30′E) by SM U-63 (Imperial German Navy) and was abandoned. It came ashore on Pantelleria but was a constructive total loss.
Schuylkill	United States	World War I: The cargo ship was torpedoed and sunk in the Mediterranean Sea 15 nautical miles (28 km) east of Cape Ténès, Algeria(36°42′N 1°40′E) by SM U-39 (Imperial German Navy). Its crew survived.
Sobral	Norway	World War I: The cargo ship was captured in the Atlantic Ocean south east of the Azores, Portugal by SM U-151 (Imperial German Navy). It was scuttled the next day (36°10′N 20°40′W).

== 22 November ==
List of shipwrecks: 22 November 1917
Ship	State	Description
Clan Cameron	United Kingdom	World War I: The cargo ship was sunk in the English Channel 23 nautical miles (43 km) south west by south of Portland Bill, Dorset by SM UB-58 (Imperial German Navy). Her crew survived.
Conovium	United Kingdom	World War I: The sailing vessel was shelled and sunk in the Irish Sea 14 nautical miles (26 km) south east of the South Arklow Lightship (United Kingdom) by SM U-97 (Imperial German Navy). Her crew survived.
Elsena	United Kingdom	World War I: The coaster was shelled and sunk in the Irish Sea 16 nautical miles (30 km) south east of the South Arklow Lightship (United Kingdom) by SM U-97 (Imperial German Navy). Her crew survived.
Francesco Patrino	Russia	World War I: The sailing vessel was sunk in the Black Sea off Nowa Affonski by SM UB-42 (Imperial German Navy).
King Idwal	United Kingdom	World War I: The cargo ship struck a mine and sank in the North Sea 35 nautical miles (65 km) east of Girdle Ness, Aberdeenshire with the loss of a crew member.
Kohistan	United Kingdom	World War I: convoy HE 1: The cargo ship was torpedoed and sunk in the Mediterranean Sea 25 nautical miles (46 km) west of Marettimo, Italy (37°48′N 11°38′E) by SM UC-35 (Imperial German Navy). Her crew survived.
Krosfond	Norway	World War I: The cargo ship was torpedoed and sunk in the Atlantic Ocean 0.5 nautical miles (930 m) east south east of The Manacles (50°03′N 5°01′W) by SM UB-57 (Imperial German Navy) with the loss of fifteen of her crew.
Siracusy	Imperial Russian Navy	World War I: The cargo ship was torpedoed and sunk in the Black Sea off Nowa Affonski (43°05′N 40°49′E) by SM UB-42 (Imperial German Navy).
Start	Norway	World War I: The coaster was sunk in the English Channel 4 nautical miles (7.4 km) south of St. Alban's Head, Dorset (50°31′N 2°04′W) by SM UB-58 (Imperial German Navy) with the loss of twelve of her crew.
Thor	Norway	The cargo ship foundered in the Pacific Ocean (approximately 34°N 161°W). Sixteen of her crew survived.
Tijuca	France	World War I: The four-masted barque was torpedoed, shelled and sunk in the Atlantic Ocean 200 nautical miles (370 km) south east of Santa Maria Island, Azores, Portugal (36°00′N 20°40′W) by SM U-151 (Imperial German Navy).

== 23 November ==
List of shipwrecks: 23 November 1917
Ship	State	Description
SMS A60	Imperial German Navy	World War I: The A26-class torpedo boat struck a mine and sank in the North Sea off the coast of Belgium with the loss of seventeen of her crew.
La Blanca	United Kingdom	World War I: The cargo ship was torpedoed and sunk in the English Channel 10 nautical miles (19 km) south south east of Berry Head, Devon by SM U-96 (Imperial German Navy) with the loss of two of her crew.
Luigina	Italy	World War I: The sailing vessel was sunk in the Mediterranean Sea east of Sardinia (39°57′N 9°58′E) by SM UC-35 (Imperial German Navy) with the loss of all hands.
Markella	Greece	World War I: The cargo ship was sunk in the Mediterranean Sea north of Monastagem, Algeria (35°18′N 0°20′W) by SM U-39 (Imperial German Navy). Her crew survived.
Ocean	United Kingdom	World War I: The cargo ship was torpedoed and sunk in the North Sea 4 nautical miles (7.4 km) east by north of Hartlepool, County Durham by SM UB-21 (Imperial German Navy). Her crew survived.
Trombetas	Portugal	World War I: The three-masted schooner was scuttled in the Atlantic Ocean 200 nautical miles (370 km) south west of Santa Maria Island, Azores (35°30′N 20°40′W) by SM U-151 (Imperial German Navy).
Westlands	United Kingdom	World War I: The cargo ship was torpedoed and sunk in the Atlantic Ocean 10 nautical miles (19 km) north of the Île Vierge, Finistère, France by SM U-53 (Imperial German Navy). Her crew survived.

== 24 November ==
List of shipwrecks: 24 November 1917
Ship	State	Description
Actaeon	United States	World War I: The cargo ship was torpedoed and sunk in the Atlantic Ocean 150 nautical miles (280 km) north north west of Cape Finisterre, Spain by SM U-84 (Imperial German Navy) with the loss of four of her crew.
Dunrobin	United Kingdom	World War I: The cargo ship was torpedoed and sunk in the Atlantic Ocean 49 nautical miles (91 km) south west by south of The Lizard, Cornwall by SM U-53 (Imperial German Navy) with the loss of 31 crew.
Enna	Italy	World War I: The cargo ship was sunk in the Tyrrhenian Sea off Acciaroli, Campania by SM U-65 (Imperial German Navy).
French Rose	United Kingdom	World War I: The coaster struck a mine and sank in the North Sea 6 nautical miles (11 km) south by west of the Shipwash Lightship (United Kingdom). Her crew survived.
Nyassa	United Kingdom	World War I: The cargo ship was torpedoed and sunk in the English Channel 3 nautical miles (5.6 km) east south east of The Lizard, Cornwall (49°56′N 5°08′W) by SM UB-57 (Imperial German Navy). Her crew survived.
Pomone	France	World War I: The cargo ship was sunk in the Bay of Biscay off Villaviciosa, Asturias, Spain by SM UC-79 (Imperial German Navy). Her crew survived.
Sabia	United Kingdom	World War I: The cargo ship was torpedoed and sunk in the English Channel 6 nautical miles (11 km) south south east of The Lizard (49°53′N 5°06′W) by SM U-96 (Imperial German Navy) with the loss of eleven of her crew.
SM U-48	Imperial German Navy	The Type U 43 submarine fouled an anti-submarine net and drifted aground on the Goodwin Sands, Kent, United Kingdom. She was attacked at daylight by Naval drifters HMS Paramount, HMS Majesty, and HMS Present Help all ((Royal Navy)) she was able to drive them off, but they were reinforced by Naval drifters HMS Acceptable, HMS Feasible, HMS Lord Claud Hamilton, and destroyer HMS Gipsy all (Royal Navy). She was then scuttled with explosives with the loss of her Captain and eighteen of her 36 crew, 17 taken as POWs.

== 25 November ==
List of shipwrecks: 25 November 1917
Ship	State	Description
Iniziativa	Italy	World War I: The sailing vessel was torpedoed and sunk in the Mediterranean Sea south of Sicily by SM UC-67 (Imperial German Navy).
Karema	United Kingdom	World War I: Convoy HE 1: The cargo ship was sunk in the Mediterranean Sea 33 nautical miles (61 km) south east of Cabo de Gata, Andalusia, Spain (36°30′N 1°32′W) by SM U-39 (Imperial German Navy) with the loss of three crew.
Oriflamme	United Kingdom	World War I: The tanker struck a mine and sank in the English Channel 9 nautical miles (17 km) south of the Nab Lightship (United Kingdom). Her crew survived.
Ostpreussen	United Kingdom	World War I: The cargo ship struck a mine and sank in the North Sea 1.5 nautical miles (2.8 km) east of the Shipwash Lightship (United Kingdom) with the loss of a crew member.
Ovid	United Kingdom	World War I: The cargo ship was torpedoed and sunk in the Mediterranean Sea 65 nautical miles (120 km) north east of Suda Bay, Crete, Greece by SM UC-74 (Imperial German Navy) with the loss of two of her crew.

== 26 November ==
List of shipwrecks: 26 November 1917
Ship	State	Description
Ango	France	World War I: The cargo ship was torpedoed and damaged in the English Channel 6 nautical miles (11 km) southeast of Falmouth, Cornwall, United Kingdom by SM UB-80 (Imperial German Navy). She was beached but was later refloated.
RFA Crenella	Royal Navy	World War I: The tanker was torpedoed and damaged in the Atlantic Ocean 146 nautical miles (270 km) west of Queenstown, County Cork, Ireland (49°47′N 10°58′W) by SM U-101 (Imperial German Navy). She was escorted into port by USS Cushing (United States Navy. Subsequently repaired and returned to service.
Drot	Norway	World War I: The cargo ship was sunk in the Bristol Channel 10 nautical miles (19 km) north-northeast of Lundy Island, Devon, United Kingdom (51°20′N 4°52′W) by SM U-96 (Imperial German Navy) with the loss of two of her crew.
Johan Mjelde	Norway	World War I: The cargo ship was sunk in the Atlantic Ocean 200 nautical miles (370 km) southeast of the Azores, Portugal (35°50′N 20°20′W) by SM U-151 (Imperial German Navy). Her crew survived.
Pontida	Italy	World War I: The cargo ship struck a mine and sank in the Gulf of Genoa off Varazze, Liguria.
Zoea	Italian Royal Navy	The Medusa-class submarine was beached by a storm in the Adriatic Sea at Rimini, Italy. She later was refloated, repaired, and returned to service.

== 27 November ==
List of shipwrecks: 27 November 1917
Ship	State	Description
Almond Branch	United Kingdom	World War I: The cargo ship torpedoed and sunk in the English Channel 2 nautical miles (3.7 km) south east of Dodman Point, Cornwall (50°12′N 4°45′W) by SM UB-57 (Imperial German Navy) with the loss of one crew member.
Bditelny	Imperial Russian Navy	World War I: The destroyer struck a mine and sank in the Baltic Sea off Mäntyluoto, Pori, Finland.
Bleamoor	United Kingdom	World War I: The collier was torpedoed and sunk in the English Channel 4 nautical miles (7.4 km) south south east of Berry Head, Devon (50°22′N 3°25′W) by SM UB-80 (Imperial German Navy) with the loss of eight of her crew.
Bremier	United Kingdom	World War I: The fishing smack was shelled and sunk in the English Channel 16 nautical miles (30 km) south east of Start Point, Devon by a Kaiserliche Marine submarine.
Eastfield	United Kingdom	World War I: The cargo ship was torpedoed and sunk in the English Channel 7 nautical miles (13 km) east south east of Dodman Point (50°14′06″N 4°42′06″W) by SM UB-57 (Imperial German Navy) with the loss of a crew member.
Galileo Ferraris	Italian Royal Navy	The Pullino-class submarine was beached by a storm at Magnavacca, Italy, on the night of 27–28 November. Refloated in January 1918, she was found to be damaged beyond repair.
Gladys	United Kingdom	World War I: The coaster struck a mine and sank in the English Channel 3 nautical miles (5.6 km) south west of Cap Gris Nez, Pas-de-Calais, France with the loss of six of her crew.
Groeswen	United Kingdom	World War I: The collier struck a mine and sank in the North Sea 3 nautical miles (5.6 km) north east of the Shipwash Lightship (United Kingdom) (51°55′N 1°40′E). Her crew survived.
Notre Dame de Rostrenen	France	World War I: The schooner was shelled and sunk in the Atlantic Ocean 59 nautical miles (109 km) west of Ouessant, Finistère (48°36′N 5°50′W) by SM U-101 (Imperial German Navy). Her crew survived.
Premier	United Kingdom	World War I: The fishing smack was sunk in the English Channel 16 nautical miles (30 km) south east of Start Point by SM U-67 (Imperial German Navy). Her crew survived.
Tungue	Portugal	World War I: The passenger ship was sunk in the Mediterranean Sea 120 nautical miles (220 km) north of Port Said, Egypt by SM UB-51 (Imperial German Navy).
Ville de Thann	France	World War I: The cargo ship was sunk in the English Channel 13 nautical miles (24 km) north east of The Lizard, Cornwall by SM UC-64 (Imperial German Navy). Her crew survived.

== 28 November ==
List of shipwrecks: 28 November 1917
Ship	State	Description
Agenoria	United Kingdom	World War I: The cargo ship was torpedoed and damaged in the Irish Sea south south east of the Copeland Islands, County Down by SM U-96 (Imperial German Navy) with the loss of a crew member. She was beached in the Belfast Lough but was later refloated.
Albert Watts	United States	World War I: The tanker struck a mine and was damaged in the Gulf of Genoa with the loss of a crew member. She reached port at Genoa, Italy the next day but was declared a total loss, or burned and sank there, or beached between Oneglia and Porto Maurizio.
Apapa	United Kingdom	World War I: The Elder Dempster 7,832 grt defensively armed passenger ship was torpedoed and sunk in the Irish Sea 3 nautical miles (5.6 km) north by east of Point Lynas, Anglesey (53°26′N 4°18′W) by SM U-96 (Imperial German Navy) with the loss of 77 lives.
Georgios Antippa	United Kingdom	World War I: The cargo ship was torpedoed and sunk in the North Sea 25 nautical miles (46 km) south by east of Flamborough Head, Yorkshire by a Kaiserliche Marine submarine.
Jane Radcliffe	United Kingdom	World War I: The collier was torpedoed and sunk in the Aegean Sea 2 nautical miles (3.7 km) south west of Antimilos, Greece by SM UC-74 (Imperial German Navy). Her crew survived.
Jeanne Conseil	France	World War I: The cargo ship was sunk in the Bay of Biscay 28 nautical miles (52 km) south west of Pointe de Poulains, Belle Île, Morbihan by SM UB-59 (Imperial German Navy). Her crew survived.
Perm	Denmark	World War I: The cargo ship was sunk in the English Channel 3 nautical miles (5.6 km) south of Prawle Point, Devon, United Kingdom (50°11′N 3°41′W) by SM U-57 (Imperial German Navy) with the loss of two crew.

== 29 November ==
List of shipwrecks: 29 November 1917
Ship	State	Description
Bob	Norway	World War I: The coaster was sunk in the English Channel 8 nautical miles (15 km) south south east of Start Point, Devon, United Kingdom by SM UB-35 (Imperial German Navy) with the loss of three of her crew.
Dirk von Minden	Imperial German Navy	World War I: The Neuwerk-class Vorpostenboot was sunk by mines west of Terschelling.
Haugastøl	Norway	World War I: The cargo ship was sunk in the English Channel 10 nautical miles (19 km) south by west of Start Point by SM UB-35 (Imperial German Navy). Her crew survived.
HMML 52	Royal Navy	The motor launch was lost on this date.
Pierre	France	World War I: The sailing vessel was sunk in the Atlantic Ocean north of Cornwall, United Kingdom by SM U-57 (Imperial German Navy). Her crew survived.
Texas	France	World War I: The cargo ship was torpedoed and damaged in the Bay of Biscay off Groix, Morbihan by SM UB-59 (Imperial German Navy). She was beached but was later refloated, repaired and returned to service.
SM UB-61	Imperial German Navy	World War I: The Type UB III submarine struck a mine and sank in the North Sea (53°52′N 4°58′E) with the loss of all 34 crew.

== 30 November ==
List of shipwrecks: 30 November 1917
Ship	State	Description
Courage	United Kingdom	World War I: The fishing smack was shelled and sunk in the Bristol Channel 6 nautical miles (11 km) west by north of Lundy Island, Devon (51°12′N 4°55′W) by SM U-57 (Imperial German Navy). Her crew survived.
Daniel F.	United States	The barge sank in the harbor at Huntington, New York.
Derbent	United Kingdom	World War I: The tanker was torpedoed and sunk in the Irish Sea 6 nautical miles (11 km) north east by east of Point Lynas, Anglesey, United Kingdom by SM U-96 (Imperial German Navy). Her crew survived.
Gazelle	United Kingdom	World War I: The fishing smack was shelled and sunk in the Bristol Channel 6 nautical miles (11 km) west by north of Lundy Island (51°12′N 4°55′W) by SM U-57 (Imperial German Navy).
Kalibia	United Kingdom	World War I: The cargo ship was torpedoed and sunk in the Atlantic Ocean 29 nautical miles (54 km) south west of The Lizard, Cornwall (49°31′N 5°32′W) by SM UB-80 (Imperial German Navy) with the loss of 25 of her crew.
Molesey	United Kingdom	World War I: The cargo ship was sunk in the English Channel 12 nautical miles (22 km) south west by west of the Brighton Lightship by SM UB-81 (Imperial German Navy). Her crew survived.
Mt 1	Imperial Russian Navy	World War I: The minesweeping boat struck a mine and sank in the Baltic Sea off Rauma, Finland.
Remorquer No.8	France	World War I: The tug struck a mine and sank in the English Channel off Cap de la Hague, Manche.

== Unknown date ==
List of shipwrecks: Unknown date 1917
Ship	State	Description
Caroline	United States	The steamer was destroyed by fire at Sausalito, California either on 18 November 1917 or in February 1918.
Faà di Bruno	Regia Marina	The monitor was caught in a storm and either driven ashore, or beached to prevent foundering, at Ancona, Italy. She later was refloated, repaired, and returned to service.
John H. Kirby	United States	World War I: The barque was captured and scuttled in the Indian Ocean 320 miles (510 km) south east of Port Elizabeth, South Africa by SMS Wolf (Imperial German Navy). Reported dates are 18 or 30 November 1917, or 1 December 1917.
Medea	Sweden	The wooden schooner was last heard from in the last days of October departing Dalarö bound for Stettin. The Swedish official history of war losses finds it "not unlikely" that German mines in the southern Baltic Sea were the cause of her disappearance. Her crew of nine was lost.
P G #6	United States	The scow was lost at Ketchikan, Territory of Alaska.
Tolo	United States	The steamboat collided with Magic (United States) in the Pacific Ocean off the coast of Washington and sank with the loss of four of the 61 people on board.
Umgeni	United Kingdom	The cargo ship departed from Glasgow, Renfrewshire in early November for a South African port. No further trace, presumed foundered with the loss of all hands.
