= U63 =

U63 may refer to:

- German submarine U-63, various vessels
- Great dodecicosahedron
- Small nucleolar RNA SNORD63
