= U58 =

U58 may refer to:

- German submarine U-58, various vessels
- HMS Hart (U58), a sloop of the Royal Navy
- Small nucleolar RNA SNORD58
- Small stellated truncated dodecahedron
