= Italian ship Alfredo Cappellini =

Alfredo Cappellini or Comandante Cappellini was the name of at least three ships of the Italian Navy named in honour of Alfredo Cappellini and may refer to:

- Italian monitor Alfredo Cappellini launched in 1915 and wrecked in 1917
- Italian submarine Comandante Cappellini, a Marcello-class submarine launched in 1939, seized by Germany in 1943 and renamed UIT-24. Seized again by Japan in 1945 and renamed I-503. She was scrapped in 1946
- Italian submarine Alfredo Cappellini (S 507), a Balao-class submarine launched in 1944 as USS Capitaine. Transferred to Italy in 1966 and scrapped in 1977.
