= Cannone navale da 381/40 =

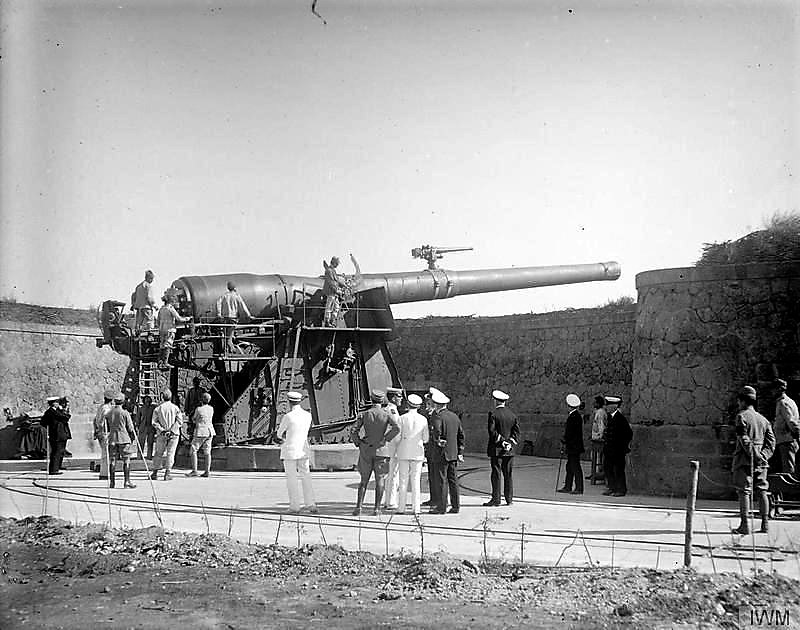
- Journalists inspecting a 15-inch Cannone navale da 381/40 along the Adriatic coast
- Type: naval gun, coast-defense gun, railroad gun
- Place of origin: Kingdom of Italy

Service history
- In service: 1916–1945
- Used by: Kingdom of Italy

Production history
- Designed: 1913–1914
- No. built: about 24

Specifications
- Mass: 63–83.56 long tons (64.0–84.9 t)
- Length: 15.74 m (51 ft 8 in)
- Barrel length: 15.2 m (49 ft 10 in)
- Shell weight: 875 or 884 kg (1,929 or 1,949 lb)
- Caliber: 381 mm (15 in)
- Breech: Interrupted screw
- Elevation: +20°, later +30°
- Muzzle velocity: 700 m/s (2,297 ft/s)
- Effective firing range: 19,800 m (21,700 yd) at +20° elevation
- Filling weight: 38.5 or 50 kg (85 or 110 lb)

The Cannone navale da 381/40 was an Italian naval gun intended to equip the dreadnought battleships of the Francesco Caracciolo class. The ships were cancelled in 1916 and their guns were diverted to other uses. Four of the seven turned over to the Esercito Italiano (Italian Army) became railroad guns, six were used as coast-defense guns and the rest were used on monitors to provide naval gunfire support for the Army. Most of the monitors were disarmed after World War I and their guns were transferred to coast-defense batteries which were used throughout World War II.

== Development ==
Italy planned a class of four dreadnought battleships to succeed the two ships of the Andrea Doria class to be armed with 381 mm (15 in) guns to match the British Queen Elizabeth class. The Italians ordered thirty guns in 1913, ten each from Ansaldo-Schneider, Armstrong-Pozzuoli, and Vickers-Terni. The guns had identical ballistic performance, but differed in construction. The government favored the English design and ordered another ten in 1914 from Armstrong-Pozzuoli despite the fact that the Ansaldo guns weighed only 63 long tons (64 t) compared to the Armstrong's 83.56 long tons (85 t). The Cannone navale da 381/40 had an overall length of 15.74 meters (51 ft 8 in) and its 40-caliber barrel was 15.24 meters (50 ft) long. The propellant for the projectiles weighed either 148 or 150 kilograms (326 or 331 lb). The rate of fire varied for each type of mount, but did not exceed one round per minute in the naval mount.

== Ammunition ==
Type of shell	Muzzle velocity	Weight	Range at +20°	Range at +30°
High-explosive	700 m/s (2,297 ft/s)	875 kg (1,929 lb)	19,800 m (21,700 yd)	27,300 m (29,900 yd)
Armor-piercing	700 m/s (2,297 ft/s)	884 kg (1,949 lb)	19,800 m (21,700 yd)	27,300 m (29,900 yd)

== Service ==
The Francesco Caracciolo-class ships were laid down in 1914–1915, but material shortages and the Italian declaration of war on Austria-Hungary in 1915 forced the Regia Marina to suspend construction in favor of higher-priority programs. This freed up their guns to be used for other purposes. By this time Armstrong-Pozzuoli had started work on a dozen guns, the last of which were finished around 1922, Ansaldo-Schneider had finished one proving gun and nine production weapons and Vickers-Terni had built around three guns.

=== Coast-defense guns ===
One twin-gun turret was built as Batteria Amalfi on the Cavallino coast (northeast of Venice). Construction began in September 1915 and took 17 months to complete. Equipped with a pair of Vickers-Terni guns, the turret was installed on the roof of a concrete bunker that contained the ammunition, and the sleeping quarters for the artillerymen manning the turret. Electrical generators and the hydraulic pumps were in separate structures connected to the main bunker by tunnels. At their thickest point the bunker's walls were 9 meters (29 ft 6 in) deep and its roof was 3 meters (9 ft 10 in) thick. The frontal armor of the turret was 400 millimeters (15.7 in) thick, its sides were protected by 300-millimeter (11.8 in) armor and it had a roof 150 millimeters (5.9 in) thick. The guns in the turret had a maximum elevation of +20°. The turret could revolve 360°, which allowed it to provide fire support for the Italian forces within range during the Second Battle of the Piave River in June 1918.

Two other twin-gun turrets were installed near Brindisi: Batteries Benedetto Brin and Fratelli Bandiera. Construction of both began in 1916, but only the former was completed during the war, test-firing its Armstrong-Pozzuoli guns in September 1917. The latter was originally planned to be equipped with 305-millimeter (12 in) guns, but it was modified to suit a pair of Armstrong-Pozzuoli guns in 1917; construction was suspended later that year, before it was finally completed in 1923. These bunkers were almost identical to Amalfi, except that they were entirely self-contained.

Although three other twin-gun turrets were planned during the 1930s, only one (Batteria Capo S. Panagia) north of Augusta, Sicily, was actually built, completed in 1934 with Armstrong-Pozzuoli guns. This turret was different than the earlier ones as its ammunition was loaded through doors in the rear of the turret, rather than the naval-type hoists previous used. Its gun could elevate to +30°. After the Italian declaration of war on France and Britain in June and the British bombardment of Genoa in early 1941, two turrets were built near the port: Batteria Monte Moro in Quinto al Mare-Genoa and Batteria Punta S. Martino in Arenzano-Genoa. Both were completed in mid-1942 and they were the same type as the turret installed in Sicily.

After Operation Husky, the Allied invasion of Sicily in mid-1943, Batteria Capo S. Panagia was demolished by its garrison before they surrendered. The two batteries at Brindisi never fired their guns in anger and were captured by the Allies in good condition. The two Genoese batteries and Batteria Amalfi were captured by the Germans after the Italian armistice in September 1943, being operated by them and the forces of the puppet Repubblica Sociale Italiana (Italian Social Republic) for the rest of the war. Batteria Monte Moro was besieged by partisans for several days before surrendering to the American 92nd Infantry Division on 29 April 1945 while Batteria Punta S. Martino was damaged by the Germans before the end of the war. Batteria Amalfi was surrendered by the Germans at the end of the war.

=== Railroad guns ===
Seven of the Schneider-Ansaldo guns were transferred to the Army although only four were turned into Cannone da 381/40 AVS railroad guns. On its mount, the gun weighed 212 tonnes (209 long tons; 234 short tons) and was 24.5 metres (80 ft) long. The gun could elevate to a maximum of 25° and it could traverse 2° on its mount. It fired high explosive shells weighing 730 kg (1,609 lb) and 876 kg (1,931 lb) to ranges of 33.6 km (21 mi) and 30 km (19 mi) respectively. It also fired a 884.5 kg (1,950 lb) armor-piercing shell to a range of 30 km (19 mi). The guns were delivered during 1917 and supported Italian operations along the Isonzo and in the Trentino. They were placed in reserve after the war and remained in storage at La Spezia for the duration of World War II.

=== Coastal monitors ===
Two Ansaldo guns were mounted on the monitor Faà di Bruno which was completed in 1917. She played a small role in the 11th Battle of the Isonzo supporting Italian troops, but was blown ashore in a storm in November. The monitor was not refloated until shortly before the end of the war and was decommissioned in 1924. Renamed GM 194 when she was reactivated in 1939 in preparation for World War II, she was towed to Genoa to bolster its defenses. Her guns were quickly disabled when an electric cable was cut during the British bombardment of Genoa. She was captured by the Germans after the Italian armistice and was turned over to the puppet Marina Nazionale Repubblicana (National Republican Navy). GM 194 was scuttled in Savona at the end of the war and was subsequently scrapped.

The monitor Alfredo Cappellini was converted from a floating crane and fitted with two Armstrong-Pozzuoli guns in a turret in 1916. Her guns had a maximum elevation of +20° and could only traverse 15° to either side. The ship also participated in the 11th Battle of the Isonzo before she foundered during a storm off Ancona, Italy, in November 1917. Two captured Austro-Hungarian self-propelled barges (Monte Santo and Sabotino) were rebuilt and fitted with one gun apiece. They were completed in July and September 1918 respectively and used to support Italian forces near Venice in the last few months of the war. Earlier that year, a group of four monitors, the Monte Grappa class, were laid down at the Regio Cantiere di Castellammare di Stabia shipyard in Naples, each armed with a single Cannone navale da 381/40, but they were not completed until 1919–1920. All of the monitors except Faà di Bruno were disarmed in 1924 and converted to other uses.

== Gallery ==
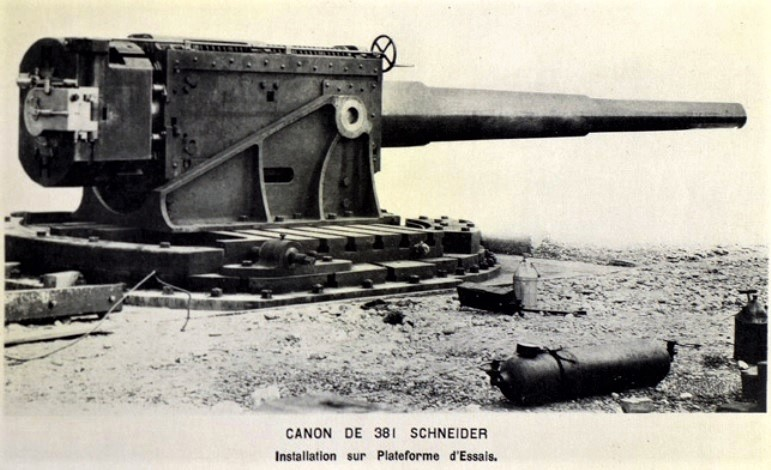
A 381/40 on a test rig.

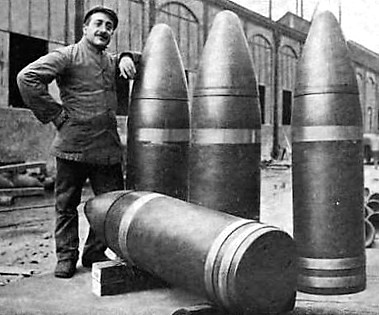
381 mm shells

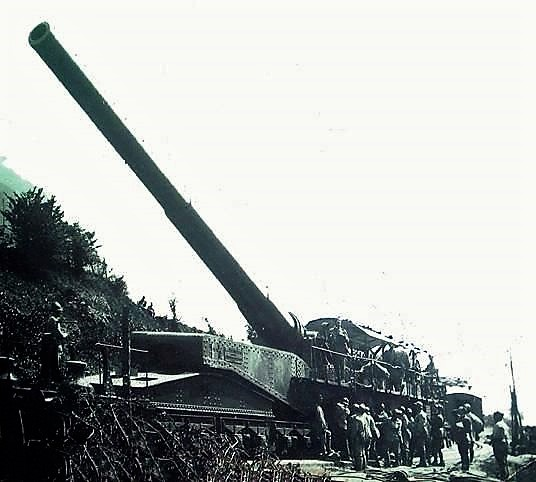
A 381/40 AVS railroad gun

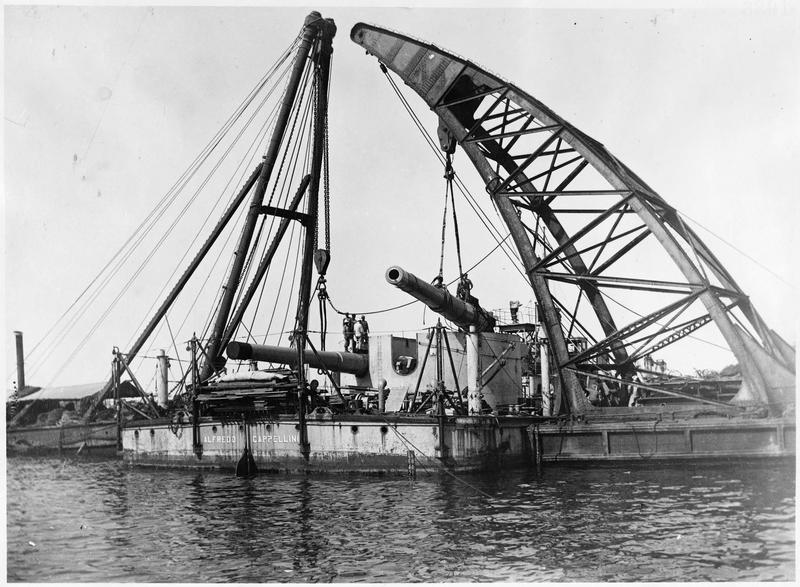
381/40 guns being installed on the monitor Alfredo Cappellini

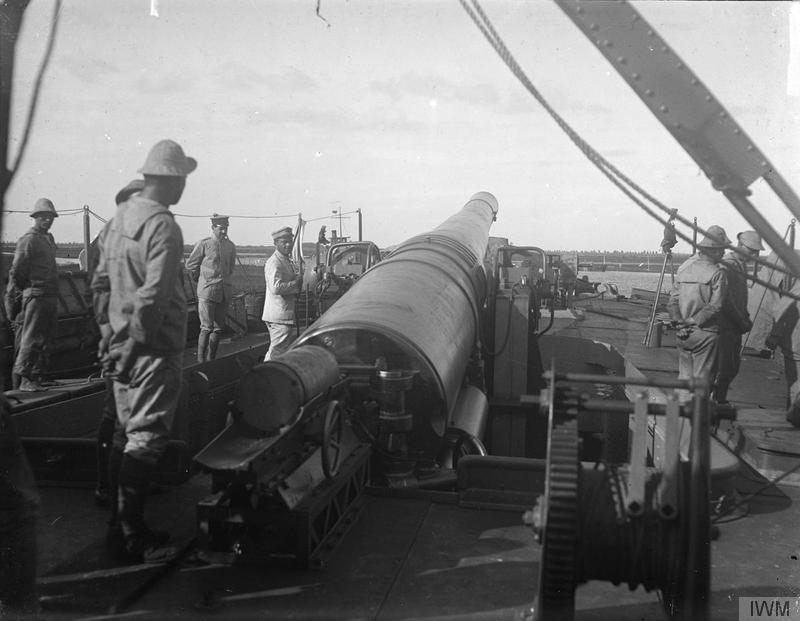
Loading a 381/40 on a monitor during the Battle of the Piave River, June 1918

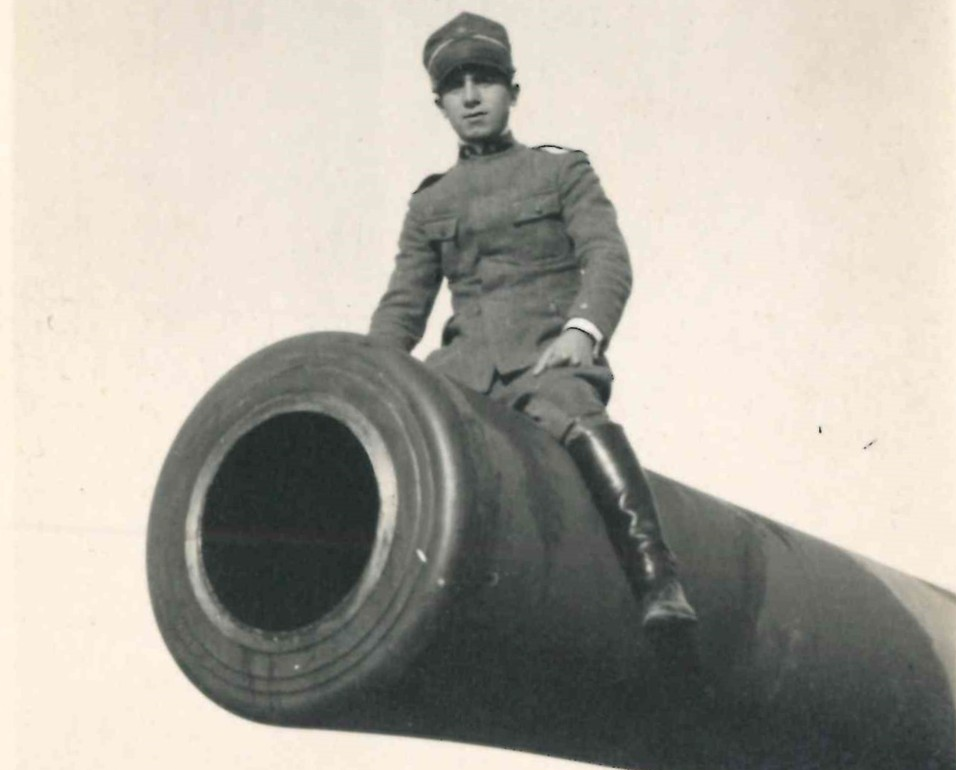
The Amalfi battery at Punta Sabbioni, Venice, 1920

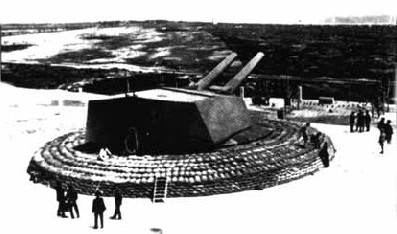
The Amalfi battery

== See also ==
- BL 15 inch Mk I naval gun: British naval equivalent
- 38 cm SK L/45 "Max": German naval and land equivalent

== Sources ==
- Brescia, Maurizio (2013). Mussolini's Navy: A Reference Guide to the Regia Marina 1930–1945. Annapolis, Maryland: Naval Institute Press. ISBN 978-1-59114-544-8.
- Clerici, Carlo; Flocchini, Alfredo & Robbins, Charles B. (1999). "The 15" (381mm)/40 Guns of the Francesco Caracciolo Class Battleships". Warship International. 36 (2). International Naval Research Organization: 151–157. ISSN 0043-0374.
- Friedman, Norman (2011). Naval Weapons of World War One: Guns, Torpedoes, Mines and ASW Weapons of All Nations; An Illustrated Directory. Barnsley: Seaforth Publishing. ISBN 978-1-84832-100-7.
- Gardiner, Robert & Gray, Randal, eds. (1985). Conway's All the World's Fighting Ships 1906–1921. Annapolis: Naval Institute Press. ISBN 0-85177-245-5.
- Kosar, Franz (1999). Eisenbahngeschütz der Welt [Railroad Guns of the World] (in German). Stuttgart: Motorbuch. ISBN 3-613-01976-0.
- Ordovini, Aldo F.; Petronio, Fulvio; et al. (December 2017). "Capital Ships of the Royal Italian Navy, 1860–1918: Part 4: Dreadnought Battleships". Warship International. LIV (4): 307–343. ISSN 0043-0374.
- Romanych, Marc (2017). Railway Guns of World War I. London: Osprey Publishing. ISBN 978-1-4728-1641-2.
- Trawick, Henry P. & Wiltering, John H. Jr. (2010). "Italian Monitor Faa di Bruno". Warship International. XLVII (4). Toledo, Ohio: International Navy Research Organization: 297–298. ISSN 0043-0374.
- Zaloga, Steve (2016). Railway Guns of World War II. Oxford, UK: Osprey Publishing. ISBN 978-1-4728-1068-7.
