= SM U-95 =

Coordinates: 49°59′N 5°12′W

History

German Empire
- Name: U-95
- Ordered: 15 September 1915
- Builder: Germaniawerft, Kiel
- Yard number: 259
- Laid down: 29 March 1916
- Launched: 20 January 1917
- Commissioned: 29 April 1917
- Fate: Rammed and sunk by the steamship SS Breaneil off the Lizard Peninsula on 7 January 1918

General characteristics
- Class & type: Type U 93 submarine
- Displacement: 838 t (825 long tons) surfaced; 1,000 t (980 long tons) submerged
- Length: 71.55 m (234 ft 9 in) (o/a); 56.05 m (183 ft 11 in) (pressure hull)
- Beam: 6.30 m (20 ft 8 in) (o/a); 4.15 m (13 ft 7 in) (pressure hull)
- Height: 8.25 m (27 ft 1 in)
- Draught: 3.94 m (12 ft 11 in)
- Installed power: 2 × 2,400 PS (1,765 kW; 2,367 shp) surfaced; 2 × 1,200 PS (883 kW; 1,184 shp) submerged
- Propulsion: 2 shafts, 2 × 1.66 m (5 ft 5 in) propellers
- Speed: 16.8 knots (31.1 km/h; 19.3 mph) surfaced; 8.6 knots (15.9 km/h; 9.9 mph) submerged
- Range: 9,020 nmi (16,710 km; 10,380 mi) at 8 knots (15 km/h; 9.2 mph) surfaced; 52 nmi (96 km; 60 mi) at 5 knots (9.3 km/h; 5.8 mph) submerged
- Test depth: 50 m (160 ft)
- Complement: 4 officers, 32 enlisted
- Armament: 6 × 50 cm (19.7 in) torpedo tubes (four bow, two stern); 12-16 torpedoes; 1 × 8.8 cm (3.5 in) SK L/30 deck gun

Service record
- Part of: IV Flotilla; 24 May 1917 – 16 January 1918
- Commanders: Kptlt. Athalwin Prinz; 15 April 1917 – 16 January 1918
- Operations: 6 patrols
- Victories: 13 merchant ships sunk (37,717 GRT); 1 auxiliary warship sunk (297 GRT); 3 merchant ships damaged (5,862 GRT)

SM U-95 was one of the 329 submarines serving in the Imperial German Navy in World War I. U-95 was engaged in the naval warfare and took part in the First Battle of the Atlantic. She was rammed and sunk by the steamship SS Breaneil off the Lizard Peninsula on 7 January 1918. The wreck was found and identified by archaeologist Innes McCartney in 2006.

== Design ==
Type U 93 submarines were preceded by the shorter Type U 87 submarines. U-95 had a displacement of 838 tonnes (825 long tons) when at the surface and 1,000 tonnes (980 long tons) while submerged. She had a total length of 71.55 m (234 ft 9 in), a pressure hull length of 56.05 m (183 ft 11 in), a beam of 6.30 m (20 ft 8 in), a height of 8.25 m (27 ft 1 in), and a draught of 3.94 m (12 ft 11 in). The submarine was powered by two 2,400 metric horsepower (1,800 kW; 2,400 shp) engines for use while surfaced, and two 1,200 metric horsepower (880 kW; 1,200 shp) engines for use while submerged. She had two propeller shafts. She was capable of operating at depths of up to 50 metres (160 ft).

The submarine had a maximum surface speed of 16.8 knots (31.1 km/h; 19.3 mph) and a maximum submerged speed of 8.6 knots (15.9 km/h; 9.9 mph). When submerged, she could operate for 52 nautical miles (96 km; 60 mi) at 5 knots (9.3 km/h; 5.8 mph); when surfaced, she could travel 9,020 nautical miles (16,710 km; 10,380 mi) at 8 knots (15 km/h; 9.2 mph). U-95 was fitted with six 50 centimetres (20 in) torpedo tubes (four at the bow and two at the stern), twelve to sixteen torpedoes, and one 8.8 cm (3.5 in) SK L/30 deck gun. She had a complement of thirty-six (thirty-two crew members and four officers).

== Summary of raiding history ==
Date	Name	Nationality	Tonnage (Note: Merchant ship tonnages are in gross register tons. Military vessels are listed by tons displacement.)	Fate
3 June 1917	Hollington	United Kingdom	4,221	Sunk
12 June 1917	Polyxena	United Kingdom	5,737	Sunk
24 July 1917	Bellville	Sweden	992	Damaged
27 July 1917	Belle of England	United Kingdom	3,877	Sunk
29 July 1917	Whitehall	United Kingdom	3,158	Sunk
30 July 1917	Eolo	Italy	1,679	Sunk
31 July 1917	Beacon Grange	United Kingdom	4,237	Damaged
3 September 1917	Majoren	Norway	2,747	Sunk
2 November 1917	Rochester	United States	2,551	Sunk
10 November 1917	Lapwing	United Kingdom	110	Sunk
11 November 1917	HMT Thuringia	Royal Navy	297	Sunk
13 November 1917	Ardmore	United Kingdom	1,304	Sunk
13 November 1917	Carlo	United Kingdom	3,040	Sunk
31 December 1917	Vigrid	Norway	1,617	Sunk
2 January 1918	Kingsley	United Kingdom	633	Damaged
2 January 1918	Christos Markettos	Italy	3,084	Sunk
2 January 1918	Gallier	United Kingdom	4,592	Sunk

== Bibliography ==
- Gröner, Erich; Jung, Dieter; Maass, Martin (1991). U-boats and Mine Warfare Vessels. German Warships 1815–1945. Vol. 2. Translated by Thomas, Keith; Magowan, Rachel. London: Conway Maritime Press. ISBN 0-85177-593-4.
