= German submarine U-58 =

U-58 may refer to one of the following German submarines:

- SM U-58, a Type U 57 submarine launched in 1916 and that served in the First World War until sunk on 17 November 1917
  - During the First World War, Germany also had these submarines with similar names:
    - SM UB-58, a Type UB III submarine launched in 1917 and sunk on 10 March 1918
    - SM UC-58, a Type UC II submarine launched in 1916 and surrendered on 24 November 1918; broken up at Cherbourg in 1921
- German submarine U-58 (1938), a Type IIC submarine that served in the Second World War until scuttled on 3 May 1945
