= Francesco Caracciolo-class battleship =

Cancelled dreadnought battleship of the Italian Royal Navy

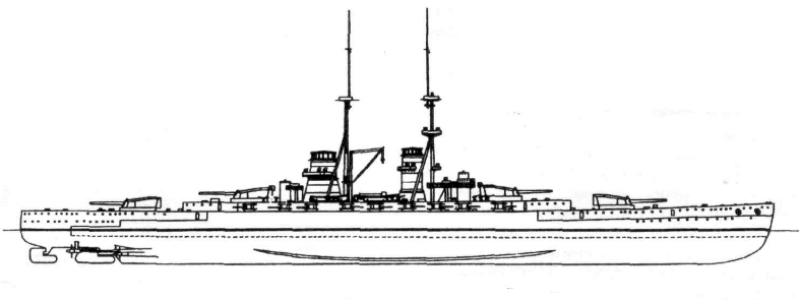
- Right-elevation drawing of the Francesco Caracciolo class

Class overview
- Name: Francesco Caracciolo class
- Operators: Regia Marina
- Preceded by: Andrea Doria class
- Succeeded by: Littorio class
- Built: 1914–1920
- Planned: 4
- Cancelled: 4

General characteristics
- Type: Dreadnought battleship
- Displacement: 34,000 t (33,000 long tons) (full load)
- Length: 212 m (696 ft) (loa)
- Beam: 29.6 m (97 ft 1 in)
- Draft: 9.5 m (31 ft 2 in)
- Installed power: 20 × Yarrow boilers; 105,000 shp (78,000 kW)
- Propulsion: 4 × shafts; 4 × steam turbines
- Speed: 28 knots (52 km/h; 32 mph)
- Range: 8,000 nmi (15,000 km; 9,200 mi) at 10 knots (19 km/h; 12 mph)
- Armament: 4 × twin 381 mm (15 in) guns; 12 × single 152 mm (6 in) guns; 8 × single 102 mm (4 in) guns; 12 × single 40 mm (1.6 in) guns; 8 × 450 or 533 mm (17.7 or 21.0 in) torpedo tubes
- Armor: Belt: 303 mm (11.9 in); Turrets: 400 mm (15.7 in); Conning tower: 400 mm (15.7 in); Deck: 50 mm (2 in)

The Francesco Caracciolo-class battleships were a group of four super-dreadnought battleships designed for the Regia Marina (Royal Italian Navy) in 1913 and ordered in 1914. The first ship of the class, Francesco Caracciolo, was laid down in late 1914; the other three ships, Cristoforo Colombo, Marcantonio Colonna, and Francesco Morosini followed in 1915. Armed with a main battery of eight 381 mm (15 in) guns and possessing a top speed of 28 knots (52 km/h; 32 mph), the four ships were intended to be the equivalent of the fast battleships like the British Queen Elizabeth class.

The class was never completed due to material shortages and shifting construction priorities after the outbreak of World War I in 1914. Only the lead ship was launched in 1920, and several proposals to convert her into an aircraft carrier were considered, but budgetary problems prevented any work being done. She was sold to an Italian shipping firm for conversion into a merchant ship, but this also proved to be too expensive, and she was broken up for scrap beginning in 1926.

== Design ==
In 1913, Admiral Paolo Thaon di Revel became the Chief of Staff of the Regia Marina (Royal Italian Navy). With tensions high in Europe and a naval arms race underway, he secured authorization for a huge new construction program, which called for four new battleships, three cruisers, and numerous other warships. Ordered in 1914, the Francesco Caracciolo class was the first type of super-dreadnought battleship designed by the Regia Marina. They were intended to match the new fast battleships being built in foreign navies, such as the British Queen Elizabeth class. Rear Admiral Edgardo Ferrati was responsible for preparing the designs. Ferrati originally called for a ship armed with twelve 381-millimeter guns and twenty 152-millimeter (6 in) secondary guns, but by the time he had finalized the design, he had reduced the main battery to eight guns and the secondary battery to twelve guns.

=== Characteristics ===
Line-drawing of the Francesco Caracciolo class; note incorrect aspects such as the single mast and ram bow

The Francesco Caracciolo class was 201.6 m (661 ft) long at the waterline and 212 m (696 ft) long overall. The ships had a beam of 29.6 m (97 ft) and a draft of 9.5 m (31 ft). They would have displaced 31,400 metric tons (30,900 long tons) at normal loading and up to 34,000 t (33,000 long tons) at full load. They were to be equipped with two tripod masts.

The ships were to be powered by four Parsons steam turbines, each driving one shaft, using steam provided by twenty oil-fired Yarrow boilers. The boilers were trunked into two large funnels. The turbines were rated at 105,000 shaft horsepower (78,000 kW), which was intended to provide a top speed of 28 knots (52 km/h; 32 mph). At a more economical speed of 10 knots (19 km/h; 12 mph), the ships were estimated to have a range of 8,000 nautical miles (15,000 km; 9,200 mi).

Francesco Caracciolo and her sisters were to be armed with a main battery of eight 40-caliber Cannone navale da 381/40 guns in four twin gun turrets, all mounted on the centerline in superfiring pairs fore and aft of the superstructure. The guns fired 885-kilogram (1,951 lb) projectiles at a muzzle velocity of 700 meters per second (2,300 ft/s) to a range of 19,800 meters (21,700 yd). The secondary armament of the ships would have consisted of a dozen 50-caliber Cannone navale da 152/50 (6 in) guns mounted in casemates clustered amidships. Their 50-kilogram (110 lb) projectiles had a muzzle velocity of 850 meters per second (2,800 ft/s). Anti-aircraft (AA) defense was to be provided by eight 45-caliber Cannone da 102/45 (4 in) guns and a dozen 40-millimeter (1.6 in) guns. The 102 mm guns fired a 13.75-kilogram (30.3 lb) shell at a muzzle velocity of 850 meters per second (2,800 ft/s). As was typical for capital ships of the period, the ships of the Francesco Caracciolo class were to be armed with eight torpedo tubes, either 450 mm (17.7 in) or 533 mm (21 in) in diameter.

Armor for the class consisted of Krupp cemented steel manufactured by Terni. The main belt armor was 303 mm (11.9 in) thick; horizontal protection consisted of a 50 mm (2 in) thick deck. The main conning tower had 400 mm (16 in) thick sides. The same level of protection was applied to the main battery turrets, while the secondary guns had 220 mm (8.7 in) of armor protection.

== Ships ==
Construction data
Ship	Namesake	Builder	Laid down	Launched	Fate
Francesco Caracciolo	Francesco Caracciolo	Regio Cantiere di Castellammare di Stabia, Naples-Castellammare di Stabia	16 October 1914	12 May 1920	Cancelled, 2 January 1921
Marcantonio Colonna	Marcantonio Colonna	Cantieri navali Odero, Genoa-Sestri Ponente	3 March 1915	Never	Cancelled, 2 January 1921
Cristoforo Colombo	Cristoforo Colombo	Ansaldo, Genoa	14 March 1915	Never	Cancelled, 2 January 1921
Francesco Morosini	Francesco Morosini	Cantiere navale fratelli Orlando, Livorno	27 June 1915	Never	Cancelled, 2 January 1921

== Construction ==
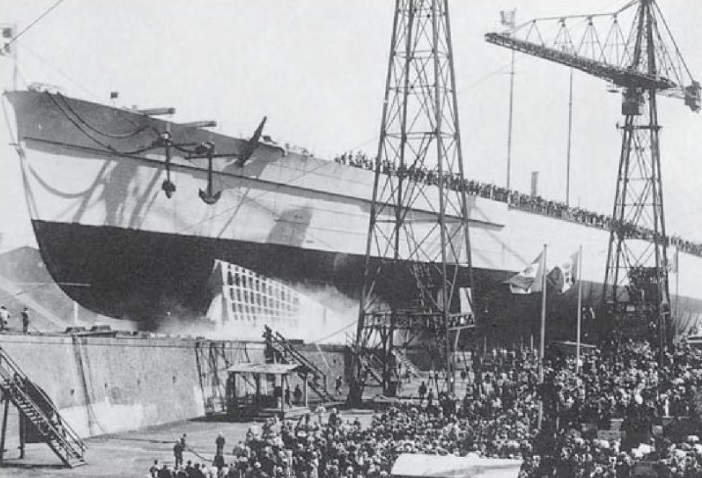
Francesco Caracciolo is launched at the Royal Naval Yard, Castellamare di Stabia, on 12 May 1920. She was the only member of her class to be launched, but she was not completed.

Shortages of steel slowed the construction of the ships, and after Italy entered World War I in May 1915, other classes of warships, particularly destroyers, submarines, and other light craft were needed to combat the Central Powers. As a result, work on the ships was suspended in March 1916. Around 9,000 t (8,900 long tons) of steel had been built into the hull for Francesco Caracciolo when work stopped. Cristoforo Colombo was the next furthest along, 12.5 percent of the hull being completed and 5 percent of the machinery assembled. Work on the last two ships had not progressed significantly by the time work on them halted. Two of the heavy guns intended for Cristoforo Colombo were installed aboard the monitor Faà di Bruno. The monitor Alfredo Cappellini received a pair of 381 mm guns from Francesco Morosini, and the two Monte Santo and four Monte Grappa-class monitors were also equipped with spare 381 mm guns. Four guns were converted into Cannone da 381/40 AVS railroad guns and others were emplaced as coast-defense guns.

Work resumed on Francesco Caracciolo in October 1919, but she was not to be completed. That year, the Regia Marina considered converting the ship into a flush-decked aircraft carrier similar to the British HMS Argus. The poor economic situation in Italy in the aftermath of World War I and the heavy expenses of the Italian pacification campaigns in Libya forced severe reductions in the naval budget. As a result, a modern carrier conversion could not be completed. The Ansaldo shipyard proposed converting Francesco Caracciolo into a floatplane carrier, a cheaper alternative. It was nevertheless still too expensive for the Regia Marina.

As well as the budgetary problems, the senior Italian navy commanders could not agree on the shape of the post-war Regia Marina. One faction advocated a traditional surface battle fleet, while a second believed a fleet composed of aircraft carriers, torpedo boats, and submarines would be ideal. A third faction, led by Admiral Giovanni Sechi, argued that a balanced fleet with a core of battleships and carriers was the most flexible option. To secure budgetary space for new construction, Sechi drastically reduced the number of older ships in service; he also cancelled the battleships of the Francesco Caracciolo class. Francesco Caracciolo was sold on 25 October 1920 to the Navigazione Generale Italiana shipping company. The firm planned to convert her into a merchant ship, but the work was deemed too expensive, and so she was temporarily mothballed in Baia Bay outside Naples.

By this time, the Regia Marina had returned to the idea of converting the ship into an aircraft carrier. In the ongoing negotiations at the Washington Naval Conference, the proposed tonnage limit for the Regia Marina was to be 61,000 metric tons (60,000 long tons), which was now to include a converted Francesco Caracciolo and two new, purpose-built ships. A new conversion design, featuring an island superstructure, was prepared for Francesco Caracciolo but Italy's chronic budgetary problems prevented the navy building any of these ships. Francesco Caracciolo was subsequently broken up for scrap, starting in late 1926. The other three ships had been dismantled shortly after the war, with some of the machinery from Cristoforo Columbo used in the construction of the ocean liner Roma.
