= SM UC-38 =

German Type UC II minelaying U-boat

History

German Empire
- Name: UC-38
- Ordered: 20 November 1915
- Builder: Blohm & Voss, Hamburg
- Yard number: 279
- Launched: 25 June 1916
- Commissioned: 26 October 1916
- Fate: Sunk, 14 December 1917

General characteristics
- Class & type: Type UC II submarine
- Displacement: 427 t (420 long tons), surfaced; 509 t (501 long tons), submerged
- Length: 50.35 m (165 ft 2 in) o/a; 40.30 m (132 ft 3 in) pressure hull
- Beam: 5.22 m (17 ft 2 in) o/a; 3.65 m (12 ft) pressure hull
- Draught: 3.65 m (12 ft)
- Propulsion: 2 × propeller shafts; 2 × 6-cylinder, 4-stroke diesel engines, 600 PS (440 kW; 590 shp); 2 × electric motors, 460 PS (340 kW; 450 shp)
- Speed: 11.6 knots (21.5 km/h; 13.3 mph), surfaced; 6.8 knots (12.6 km/h; 7.8 mph), submerged
- Range: 10,180 nmi (18,850 km; 11,710 mi) at 7 knots (13 km/h; 8.1 mph) surfaced; 54 nmi (100 km; 62 mi) at 4 knots (7.4 km/h; 4.6 mph) submerged
- Test depth: 50 m (160 ft)
- Complement: 26
- Armament: 6 × 100 cm (39.4 in) mine tubes; 18 × UC 200 mines; 3 × 50 cm (19.7 in) torpedo tubes (2 bow/external; one stern); 7 × torpedoes; 1 × 8.8 cm (3.5 in) Uk L/30 deck gun
- Notes: 35-second diving time

Service record
- Part of: Pola / Mittelmeer Flotilla; 23 January – 14 December 1917
- Commanders: Oblt.z.S. Albrecht von Dewitz; 19 – 29 October 1916; Oblt.z.S. Alfred Klatt; 19 October 1916 – 4 August 1917; Oblt.z.S. Hans Hermann Wendlandt; 5 August – 14 December 1917
- Operations: 9 patrols
- Victories: 36 merchant ships sunk (50,414 GRT); 3 warships sunk (9,308 tons); 4 auxiliary warships sunk (2,586 GRT); 3 merchant ships damaged (13,352 GRT)

SM UC-38 was a German Type UC II minelaying submarine or U-boat in the German Imperial Navy (German: Kaiserliche Marine) during World War I. The U-boat was ordered on 20 November 1915 and was launched on 25 June 1916. She was commissioned into the German Imperial Navy on 26 October 1916 as SM UC-38. (Note: "SM" stands for "Seiner Majestät" (English: His Majesty's) and combined with the U for Unterseeboot would be translated as His Majesty's Submarine.) UC 38 was a successful commerce raider, operating throughout her career in the Mediterranean theatre. In nine patrols UC-38 was credited with sinking 43 ships, either by torpedo or by mines laid. She was sunk in December 1917 in an action off Cape Ducato, Greece, during which she torpedoed the French cruiser Chateaurenault.

== Design ==
A Type UC II submarine, UC-38 had a displacement of 427 tonnes (420 long tons) when at the surface and 509 tonnes (501 long tons) while submerged. She had a length overall of 50.35 m (165 ft 2 in), a beam of 5.22 m (17 ft 2 in), and a draught of 3.65 m (12 ft). The submarine was powered by two six-cylinder four-stroke diesel engines each producing 300 metric horsepower (220 kW; 300 shp) (a total of 600 metric horsepower (440 kW; 590 shp)), two electric motors producing 460 metric horsepower (340 kW; 450 shp), and two propeller shafts. She had a dive time of 35 seconds and was capable of operating at a depth of 50 metres (160 ft).

The submarine had a maximum surface speed of 11.6 knots (21.5 km/h; 13.3 mph) and a submerged speed of 6.6 knots (12.2 km/h; 7.6 mph). When submerged, she could operate for 54 nautical miles (100 km; 62 mi) at 4 knots (7.4 km/h; 4.6 mph); when surfaced, she could travel 10,180 nautical miles (18,850 km; 11,710 mi) at 7 knots (13 km/h; 8.1 mph). UC-38 was fitted with six 100 centimetres (39 in) mine tubes, eighteen UC 200 mines, three 50 centimetres (20 in) torpedo tubes (one on the stern and two on the bow), seven torpedoes, and one 8.8 cm (3.5 in) Uk L/30 deck gun. Her complement was twenty-six crew members.

== Action off Cape Ducato ==
On 14 December 1917, by 38°15′N 20°22′E, under Hans Hermann Wendlandt, UC-38 met a French convoy comprising the fast cruiser Chateaurenault, serving as a troopship, and her escorts Mameluk, Rouen and Lansquenet. UC-38 approached and fired one torpedo on Chateaurenault, which was hit in her middle section at 6:47. UC-38 dived at 38 metres, while the Mameluk and Rouen rushed to the launching position of the torpedo, and Lansquenet started picking up people thrown overboard by the explosion. Chateaurenault requested her escorts to close in and evacuate personnel, which was completed by 07:26. The trawler Balsamine came to the rescue and made attempts to take Chateaurenault in tow.

Back to periscope depth, UC-38 saw Chateaurenault still afloat, and fired a second torpedo, which hit at 8:20; Chateaurenault foundered quickly, but all personnel still alive aboard could be rescued. Lansquenet, in the process of picking up her launches, rushed to the launching point and fired 7 depth charges. One caused a light leak in the submarine; Captain Wendlandt ordered a dive to bring his ship below the area targeted by the grenades, but a false manœuvre made UC-38 climb instead, and a second explosion caused a large leak, forcing Wendlandt to crash surface and abandon ship.

UC-38 surfaced briefly and was immediately targeted by the guns of Mameluk, which continued her attack by launching several depth charges. UC-38 surfaced again, and this time both Mameluk and Lansquenet opened fire, hitting her several times and killing several of her crew as they exited. She sank at 8:40, and the French destroyers picked up the survivors.

German sources claim that 25 men were rescued and 9 killed; a sailor of UC-38 claimed that 20 men were saved out of a 28-man crew; French enquiry reports 20 rescued and 5 confirmed dead out of a 27-man crew.

== Sinking ==
Sir Ronald Ross, first British Nobel laureate for his discovery of the malaria vector, embarked aboard the cruiser Châteaurenault at Taranto, Italy, on 13 December 1917 on his way to Salonika. Ross recounts the moment the SM UC-38 was destroyed in his 1923 memoirs:

"Suddenly all the soldiers began pointing in one direction and one behind me said ‘Voyez monsieur’. There, 200 yards from us, was the deck of an emerging submarine. She had been touched by one of our depth-charges. Her crew were jumping off her deck into the sea, one after the other, as fast as they could like frogs. In another minute a storm of shells and shot ploughed up the water round her. The our captain yelled out ‘Asseyez vous’. We were going to fire off our own big gun...Our shell took effect; up rose the stern of the submarine and then slowly down she slid, as her victim had done, leaving a number of pink heads dotting the water – Boches clamouring to be saved. A Frenchman near me was handing round pistols to shoot at them, but our captain promptly stopped that. Boats went out and rescued 18 of the German crew; they came aboard naked and shivering but happy! For some reason we were all happy together."

== Summary of raiding history ==
Date	Name	Nationality	Tonnage (Note: Merchant ship tonnages are in gross register tons. Military vessels are listed by tons displacement.)	Fate
16 February 1917	Laertis	Greece	3,914	Sunk
19 February 1917	Quinto	Kingdom of Italy	1,796	Sunk
20 February 1917	Doravore	Norway	2,760	Sunk
22 February 1917	Adelina	Kingdom of Italy	528	Sunk
22 February 1917	Ape	Kingdom of Italy	301	Sunk
22 February 1917	Giovanni P.	Kingdom of Italy	105	Sunk
22 February 1917	Michielino	Kingdom of Italy	20	Sunk
22 February 1917	San Michele	Kingdom of Italy	583	Sunk
22 February 1917	Vincenzino	Kingdom of Italy	20	Sunk
24 February 1917	Albina	Kingdom of Italy	187	Sunk
27 February 1917	Elena M.	Kingdom of Italy	125	Sunk
27 February 1917	S. Ciro Palmerino	Kingdom of Italy	113	Sunk
24 March 1917	Emanuela	Kingdom of Italy	16	Sunk
31 March 1917	Brodness	United Kingdom	5,736	Sunk
1 April 1917	Warren	United Kingdom	3,709	Sunk
2 April 1917	Filicudi	Regia Marina	257	Sunk
3 April 1917	Annunziata A	Kingdom of Italy	206	Sunk
3 April 1917	Caterina R.	Kingdom of Italy	214	Sunk
3 April 1917	Domenico	Kingdom of Italy	260	Sunk
3 April 1917	Nuova Maria Di Porto Salvo	Kingdom of Italy	48	Sunk
12 April 1917	Monviso	Kingdom of Italy	4,020	Damaged
13 June 1917	St. Andrews	United Kingdom	3,613	Sunk
15 June 1917	Elvaston	United Kingdom	4,130	Damaged
15 June 1917	Pasha	United Kingdom	5,930	Sunk
15 June 1917	Saint Louis V	France	5,202	Damaged
12 July 1917	Grace	United States	1,861	Sunk
15 July 1917	L.B.S. 1011	Greece	20	Sunk
15 July 1917	L.B.S. 29	Greece	10	Sunk
15 July 1917	HMS Redbreast	Royal Navy	1,313	Sunk
16 July 1917	Firfield	United Kingdom	4,029	Sunk
16 July 1917	Unidentified Sailing Vessel	Greece	20	Sunk
17 July 1917	HMS Newmarket	Royal Navy	833	Sunk
18 July 1917	K.507	Greece	40	Sunk
28 August 1917	Pasqualino Carmela	Kingdom of Italy	61	Sunk
28 August 1917	Scilla	Kingdom of Italy	397	Sunk
29 August 1917	Vronwen	United Kingdom	5,714	Sunk
22 September 1917	Garifaglia	Greece	430	Sunk
23 September 1917	Agios Nicolaos	Greece	119	Sunk
3 November 1917	Nefeli	Greece	3,868	Sunk
7 November 1917	Villemer	United States	3,627	Sunk
11 November 1917	HMS M15	Royal Navy	540	Sunk
11 November 1917	HMS Staunch	Royal Navy	750	Sunk
14 November 1917	Panormitis	Greece	20	Sunk
14 November 1917	Panaghia	Greece	14	Sunk
6 December 1917	Tubereuse	French Navy	183	Sunk
14 December 1917	Châteaurenault	French Navy	8,018	Sunk
