= SM UB-56 =

German submarine

- UB-148 at sea, a U-boat similar to UB-56.

History

German Empire
- Name: UB-56
- Ordered: 20 May 1916
- Builder: AG Weser, Bremen
- Cost: 3,276,000 German Papiermark
- Yard number: 268
- Laid down: 5 September 1916
- Launched: 6 June 1917
- Commissioned: 19 July 1917
- Fate: Sunk 19 December 1917 at 50°58′N 01°21′E by a mine, 37 dead

General characteristics
- Class & type: Type UB III submarine
- Displacement: 516 t (508 long tons) surfaced; 646 t (636 long tons; 712 short tons) submerged
- Length: 55.85 m (183 ft 3 in) (o/a)
- Beam: 5.80 m (19 ft)
- Draught: 3.72 m (12 ft 2 in)
- Propulsion: 2 × propeller shaft; 2 × Körting four-stroke 6-cylinder diesel engines, 1,050 bhp (780 kW); 2 × Siemens-Schuckert electric motors, 780 shp (580 kW)
- Speed: 13.4 knots (24.8 km/h; 15.4 mph) surfaced; 7.8 knots (14.4 km/h; 9.0 mph) submerged
- Range: 9,020 nmi (16,710 km; 10,380 mi) at 6 knots (11 km/h; 6.9 mph) surfaced; 55 nmi (102 km; 63 mi) at 4 knots (7.4 km/h; 4.6 mph) submerged
- Test depth: 50 m (160 ft)
- Complement: 3 officers, 31 men
- Armament: 5 × 50 cm (19.7 in) torpedo tubes (4 bow, 1 stern); 10 torpedoes; 1 × 8.8 cm (3.46 in) deck gun

Service record
- Part of: Flandern I Flotilla; 10 September – 19 December 1917
- Commanders: Oblt.z.S. Hans Valentier; 19 July – 19 December 1917
- Operations: 4 patrols
- Victories: 4 merchant ships sunk (5,387 GRT)

SM UB-56 was a German Type UB III submarine or U-boat in the German Imperial Navy (German: Kaiserliche Marine) during World War I. She was commissioned into the Flanders Flotilla of the German Imperial Navy on 19 July 1917 as SM UB-56. (Note: "SM" stands for "Seiner Majestät" (English: His Majesty's) and combined with the U for Unterseeboot would be translated as His Majesty's Submarine.)

She operated as part of the Flanders Flotilla based in Zeebrugge. UB-56 was sunk at 23:41 on 19 December 1917 at 50°58′N 01°21′E after striking a mine, 37 crew members lost their lives in the event.

== Construction ==
She was built by AG Weser, Bremen and following just under a year of construction, launched at Bremen on 6 June 1917. UB-56 was commissioned later that same year. Like all Type UB III submarines, UB-56 carried 10 torpedoes and was armed with a 8.8 cm (3.46 in) deck gun. UB-56 would carry a crew of up to 3 officer and 31 men and had a cruising range of 9,020 nautical miles (16,710 km; 10,380 mi). UB-56 had a displacement of 516 t (508 long tons) while surfaced and 646 t (636 long tons; 712 short tons) when submerged. Her engines enabled her to travel at 13.4 knots (24.8 km/h; 15.4 mph) when surfaced and 7.8 knots (14.4 km/h; 9.0 mph) when submerged.

== Summary of raiding history ==
Date	Name	Nationality	Tonnage (Note: Tonnages are in gross register tons)	Fate
13 November 1917	Atlas	United Kingdom	989	Sunk
13 November 1917	Axwell	United Kingdom	1,442	Sunk
17 November 1917	Lalen Mendi	Spain	2,183	Sunk
21 November 1917	Maine	France	773	Sunk

== Bibliography ==
- Bendert, Harald (2000). Die UB-Boote der Kaiserlichen Marine, 1914-1918. Einsätze, Erfolge, Schicksal (in German). Hamburg: Verlag E.S. Mittler & Sohn GmbH. ISBN 3-8132-0713-7.
- Gröner, Erich; Jung, Dieter; Maass, Martin (1991). German Warships 1815–1945, U-boats and Mine Warfare Vessels. Vol. 2. Translated by Thomas, Keith; Magowan, Rachel. London: Conway Maritime Press. ISBN 0-85177-593-4.
- Rössler, Eberhard (1979). Die deutschen U-Boote und ihre Werften: eine Bilddokumentation über den deutschen U-Bootbau; in zwei Bänden (in German). Vol. I. Munich: Bernard & Graefe. ISBN 3-7637-5213-7.
