= German submarine U-63 =

U-63 may refer to one of the following German submarines:

- U-63, the lead ship of the Type U 63 class of submarines; launched in 1915 and that served in the First World War until surrendered on 16 January 1919; broken up at Blyth in 1922
  - During the First World War, Germany also had these submarines with similar names:
    - SM UB-63, a Type UB III submarine launched in 1917 and disappeared after 14 January 1918
    - SM UC-63, a Type UC II submarine launched in 1917 and sunk on 1 November 1917
- German submarine U-63 (1939), a Type IIC submarine that served in the Second World War until sunk 25 February 1940
