= HMS Redbreast (1915) =

Former British cargo ship

History

United Kingdom
- Name: SS Redbreast
- Operator: G. & J. Burns Ltd, Glasgow
- Builder: A. & J. Inglis, Pointhouse
- Yard number: 285
- Launched: 18 April 1908

United Kingdom
- Name: HMS Redbreast
- Acquired: 17 July 1915
- Out of service: 15 July 1917
- Fate: Sunk 15 July 1917

General characteristics
- Tonnage: 1,313 GRT
- Length: 267 ft (81 m)
- Beam: 33.6 ft (10.2 m)
- Propulsion: Single screw 3-cylinder triple expansion steam engine, manufactured by builder

HMS Redbreast was a passenger and cargo ship requisitioned by the British Government during World War I, and used as a messenger ship and anti-submarine Q-ship. She was torpedoed and sunk by the Imperial German Navy submarine UC-38 in the Aegean Sea on 15 July 1917 while on passage from Skyros to the Doro Channel. Forty-two of her crew were killed.
