= Cannone da 381/40 AVS =

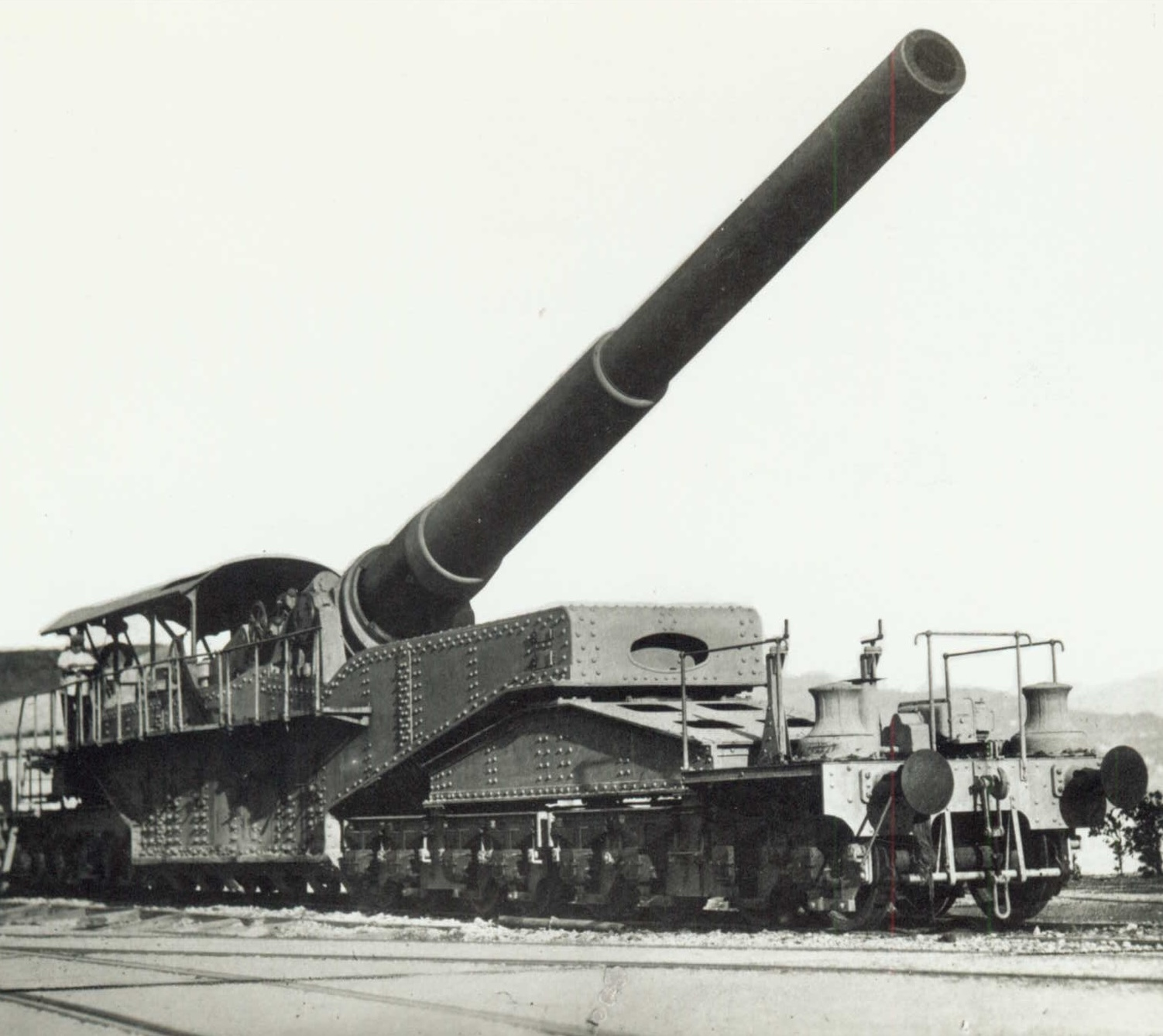
- A 381/40 AVS during the first world war.
- Type: Railway gun
- Place of origin: Kingdom of Italy

Service history
- In service: 1917–1919
- Used by: Kingdom of Italy
- Wars: World War I

Production history
- Designed: 1916
- Produced: 1916
- No. built: 4

Specifications
- Mass: 212 t (209 long tons; 234 short tons)
- Length: 24.6 m (81 ft)
- Barrel length: 15.25 m (50 ft) L/40
- Shell: Separate loading bagged charges and projectiles
- Shell weight: 876 kg (1,931 lb)
- Caliber: 381 mm (15 in)
- Breech: Interrupted screw breech
- Recoil: Cradle and sliding recoil
- Carriage: Front: Two four-axle bogies Rear: One six-axle bogie
- Elevation: 0 to +25°
- Traverse: +1°
- Muzzle velocity: 762 m/s (2,500 ft/s)
- Maximum firing range: 24 km (15 mi)

The Cannone da 381/40 AVS was an Italian railway gun that saw action during World War I.

== History ==
Although the majority of combatants had heavy field artillery prior to the outbreak of the First World War, none had adequate numbers of heavy guns in service, nor had they foreseen the growing importance of heavy artillery once the Italian Front stagnated and trench warfare set in. Since aircraft of the period were not yet capable of carrying large diameter bombs the burden of delivering heavy firepower fell on the artillery. Two sources of heavy artillery suitable for conversion to field use were surplus coastal defense guns and naval guns.

However, a paradox faced artillery designers of the time; while large caliber naval guns were common, large caliber land weapons were not due to their weight, complexity, and lack of mobility. Large caliber field guns often required extensive site preparation because the guns had to be broken down into multiple loads light enough to be towed by a horse team or the few traction engines of the time and then reassembled before use. Building a new gun could address the problem of disassembling, transporting and reassembling a large gun, but it did not necessarily address how to convert existing heavy weapons to make them more mobile. Rail transport proved to be the most practical solution because the problems of heavy weight, lack of mobility and reduced setup time were addressed.

== Design ==
The Cannone da 381/40 AVS started life as four Cannone da 381/40 naval guns which were intended to arm Dreadnought battleships of the Francesco Caracciolo-class of the Regia Marina but were made surplus when that class of ship was canceled. Three different guns were ordered for evaluation from Schneider-Ansaldo, Armstrong-Pozzuoli, and Vickers-Terni for the Francesco Caracciolo project. Although the construction of the guns differed they had nearly identical ballistic performance. The guns from Armstrong-Pozzuoli, and Vickers-Terni were wire wound guns while the Schneider-Ansaldo guns were of monobloc construction. The wire wound guns weighed 85 t (84 LT) while the monobloc guns only weighed 64 t (63 LT). The Schneider-Ansaldo guns were chosen for conversion to railway guns. The guns used interrupted screw breeches and fired separate loading bagged charges and projectiles. It fired high explosive shells weighing 730 and 876 kg (1,609 and 1,931 lb) to ranges of 33.6 and 30 km (20.9 and 18.6 mi) respectively. It also fired a 884.5 kg (1,950 lb) armor-piercing shell to a range of 30 km (19 mi). The guns were fed from an attached ammunition wagon with an elevated ammunition trough between the carriages.

The carriages consisted of a large rectangular steel base, which was suspended on three articulated rail bogies with two four-axle bogies at the front and one six-axle bogie at the rear similar to French Schneider gun carriages of the period. This asymmetric layout was less common and was chosen because the barrel was trunnioned well to the rear and a large counterweight was added to the breech to try and balance the preponderance of the barrel which was towards the front of the carriage. The number of axles was determined by the weight limit for European railways of 17 tonnes per axle. Due to this nose heaviness the guns were only capable of +25° of elevation. The guns used a combination of cradle recoil with four hydraulic buffers above and two pneumatic recuperators below the barrel and sliding recoil for the carriage. The carriage only had a limited amount of traverse +1° L/R controlled by the rear bogie so it was aimed by drawing the guns across a section of curved track. Once in firing position, a section of rail bed was reinforced with wood and iron beams to support the weight of the gun. Six wooden beams under the center of the carriage were then lowered to lay across the tracks and the carriage was jacked up to take the weight off the bogies and anchor the gun in place. When the gun fired the entire carriage recoiled a few feet and was stopped by the friction of the beams on the tracks. The carriage was then lowered onto its axles and was either pushed back into place with a shunting locomotive or a windlass mounted on the front of the carriage pulled the carriage back into position. This cheap, simple and effective system came to characterize Schneider's railway guns during the later war years and is known as the Glissement system.

== World War One ==
The four Cannone da 381/40 AVS entered service at the beginning of 1917 and were first used during the Battle of Caporetto. The four guns were placed in storage at La Spezia between the wars and were not mobilized during World War II.

== Gallery ==
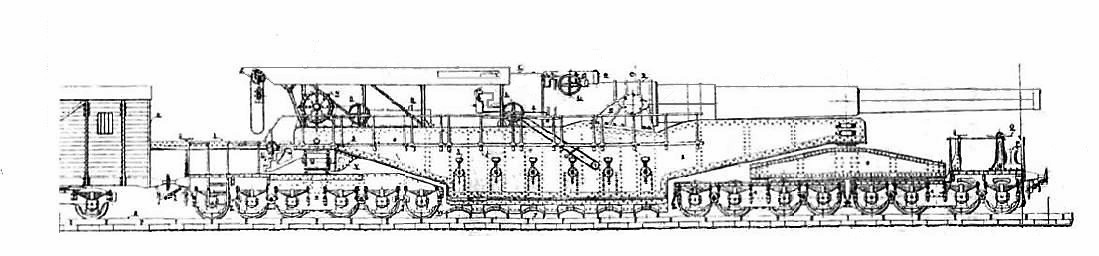
A line diagram of carriage components.

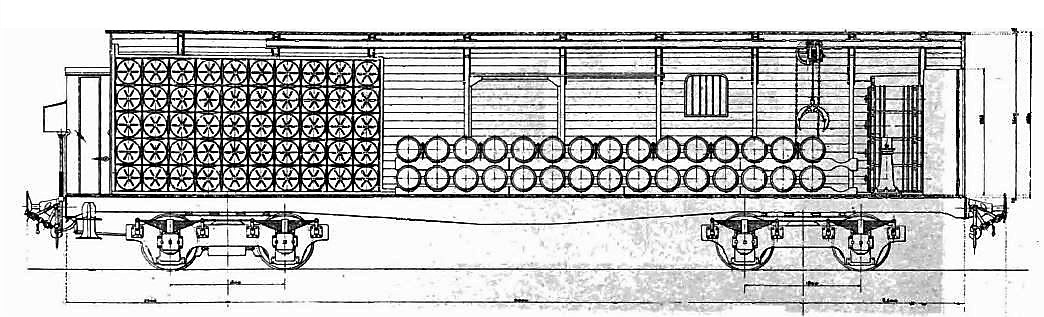
The ammunition wagon.

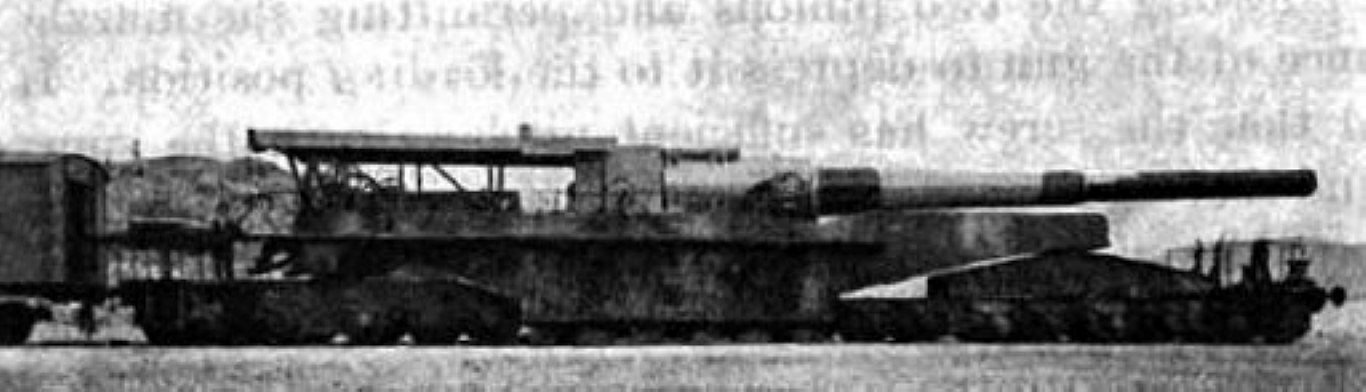
A profile shot of the 381/40 AVS at minimum elevation.

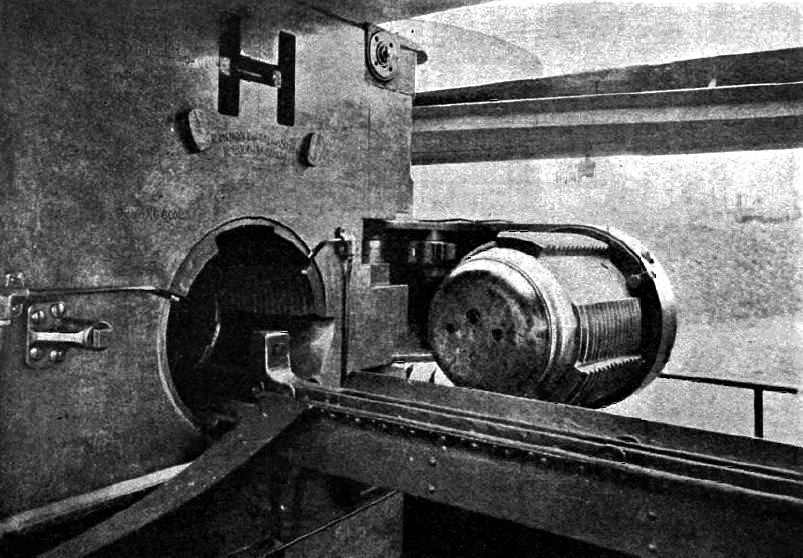
The breech of the 381/40 AVS with counterweight.

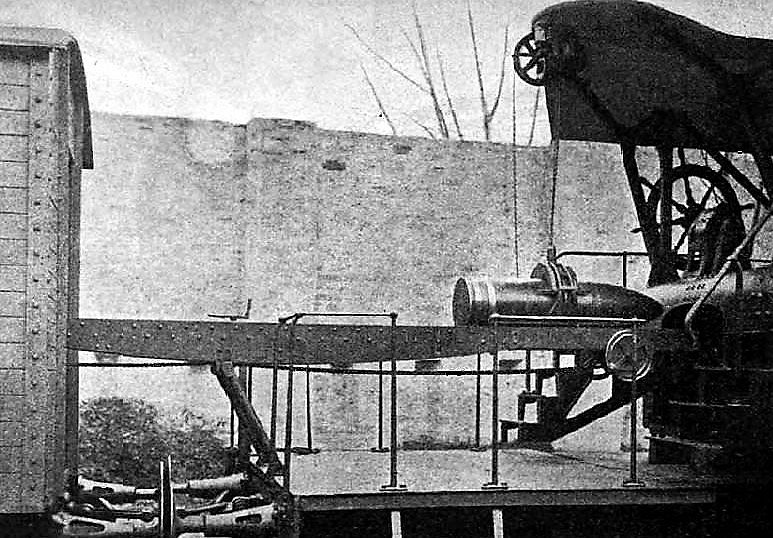
The ammunition trough between the ammunition wagon and the gun.

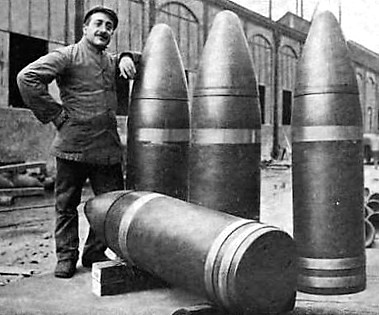
381 mm ammunition.
