= Italian monitor Faà di Bruno =

Italian monitor

- Faà di Bruno

Class overview
- Built: 1916–1917
- In commission: 1917–1924
- Completed: 1
- Scrapped: 1

History

Kingdom of Italy
- Name: Faà di Bruno
- Namesake: Emilio Faà di Bruno
- Builder: Venetian Arsenal
- Laid down: 10 October 1915
- Launched: 30 January 1916
- Commissioned: 1 April 1917
- Renamed: GM 194, 1939
- Stricken: 13 November 1924
- Reinstated: 1939
- Fate: Scrapped, 1945–1946

General characteristics
- Type: Monitor
- Displacement: 2,854 long tons (2,900 t) (standard)
- Length: 55.56 m (182 ft 3 in)
- Beam: 27 m (88 ft 7 in)
- Draft: 2.24 m (7 ft 4 in)
- Installed power: 1 boiler; 465 ihp (347 kW)
- Propulsion: 2 shafts; 2 triple-expansion steam engines
- Speed: 3.31 knots (6.13 km/h; 3.81 mph) (trials)
- Complement: 45
- Armament: 1 × twin 381 mm (15 in) guns; 4 × single 76.2 mm (3 in) AA guns; 2 × single 40 mm (1.6 in) Vickers-Terni 1915/1917 light AA guns
- Armor: Deck: 40 mm (1.6 in); Turret: 110 mm (4.3 in); Barbette: 60 mm (2.4 in)

Faà di Bruno was an Italian monitor built during World War I. Completed in 1917, the ship played a small role in the 11th Battle of the Isonzo later that year. She was decommissioned in 1924, but returned to service as the floating battery GM 194 at the beginning of World War II and was towed to Genoa and where she spent the rest of the war. The ship had her guns disabled when the Royal Navy bombarded Genoa in 1941. GM 194 was captured by the Germans after the Italian Armistice in 1943 and was turned over to the puppet Repubblica Sociale Italiana (Italian Social Republic) that they installed afterward. She was scuttled at the end of the war and subsequently scrapped.

== Development and description ==
Faà di Bruno was built when 40-caliber Cannone navale da 381/40 guns from the Francesco Caracciolo-class battleships became available after their construction was suspended in 1916. Her guns were built by Ansaldo-Schneider and originally destined for the Cristoforo Colombo. She displaced 2,854 long tons (2,900 t), with a length between perpendiculars of 55.56 meters (182 ft 3 in), a beam of 27 meters (88 ft 7 in) and a draft of 2.24 meters (7 ft 4 in). Faà di Bruno was powered by two surplus Thornycroft vertical triple-expansion steam engines from discarded torpedo boats. One Kess boiler provided enough steam to provide a total of 465 indicated horsepower (347 kW) between them. On her sea trials the ship reached a maximum speed of 3.31 knots (6.1 km/h; 3.8 mph), but her maximum speed in service was about 2.5 knots (4.6 km/h; 2.9 mph). The ship's navigation bridge was placed on a prominent tripod mast abaft the gun turret. Faà di Bruno's crew consisted of 45 officers and enlisted men.

Her Cannone navale da 381/40 guns could elevate +15° and her twin-gun turret could traverse 30° to either side. They fired an 884-kilogram (1,949 lb) armor-piercing shell at a muzzle velocity of 700 m/s (2,297 ft/s). She was fitted with four 40-caliber 76.2 mm (3 in) Ansaldo anti-aircraft (AA) guns. They fired a 6.5-kilogram (14.3 lb) high explosive shell at a muzzle velocity of 700 m/s. The ship also mounted two 39-caliber water-cooled 40 mm (1.6 in) Vickers-Terni 1915/1917 light AA guns. Their 0.91-kilogram (2 lb) shells were fired at a muzzle velocity of 622 m/s (2,040 ft/s).

Faà di Bruno's hull was surrounded by a concrete cofferdam 2.9 meters (9 ft 6 in) thick that was strapped to her hull. Faà di Bruno's deck armor had a thickness of 40 millimeters (1.6 in). It sloped down from the center and had a peak of 7 feet (2.1 m). Her guns were mounted in an open-topped turret covered by an armored dome. The turret sides had a total thickness of 110 millimeters (4.3 in) in three layers and its barbette had armor 60 millimeters (2.4 in) thick.

== Service ==
Faà di Bruno in 1917

Faà di Bruno was laid down on 10 October 1915, even before the battleships were officially suspended, by the Venetian Arsenal to a design by Rear Admiral Giuseppe Rota that was essentially that of a self-propelled barge as she lacked a bow. The ship was launched on 30 January 1916 and commissioned on 1 April 1917. Her first action came during the 11th Battle of the Isonzo in August 1917. Together with the Italian monitor Alfredo Cappellini and the British monitors Earl of Peterborough and Sir Thomas Picton, she bombarded Austro-Hungarian positions with little noticeable effect. She was driven ashore in a storm in November, but was not salvaged for almost a full year.

She was stricken from the Navy List on 13 November 1924, but was placed back into service at the beginning of World War II as the floating battery GM 194. She was towed from Venice to Genoa, where she remained for the rest of the war. When the Royal Navy bombarded Genoa on 9 February 1941, she only fired three times at the British ships because one of the first British shells damaged the cables that provided electrical power to her guns. She was captured by the Germans after the Italian armistice and was turned over to the puppet Marina Nazionale Repubblicana (National Republican Navy). GM 194 was scuttled in Savona at the end of the war and was subsequently scrapped.

== Bibliography ==
- Brescia, Maurizio (2013). Mussolini's Navy: A Reference Guide to the Regia Marina 1930-1945. Annapolis, Maryland: Naval Institute Press. ISBN 978-1-59114-544-8.
- Buxton, Ian (2008). Big Gun Monitors: Design, Construction and Operations 1914–1945 (2nd revised and expanded ed.). Annapolis, Maryland: Naval Institute Press. ISBN 978-1-59114-045-0.
- Clerici, Carlo; Flocchini, Alfredo & Robbins, Charles B. (1999). "The 15" (381mm)/40 Guns of the Francesco Caracciolo Class Battleships". Warship International. 36 (2). Toledo, OH: International Naval Research Organization: 151–157. ISSN 0043-0374.
- Fraccaroli, Aldo (1970). Italian Warships of World War I. London: Ian Allan. ISBN 978-0-7110-0105-3.
- Friedman, Norman (2011). Naval Weapons of World War One. Barnsley, UK: Seaforth. ISBN 978-1-84832-100-7.
- Gardiner, Robert, ed. (1992). The Eclipse of the Big Gun: The Warship, 1906-45. Conway's History of the Ship. London: Conway Maritime Press. ISBN 0-85177-566-7.
- Gardiner, Robert & Gray, Randal, eds. (1985). Conway's All the World's Fighting Ships 1906-1921. Annapolis, Maryland: Naval Institute Press. ISBN 0-85177-245-5.
- Ordovini, Aldo F.; Petronio, Fulvio; et al. (December 2017). "Capital Ships of the Royal Italian Navy, 1860–1918: Part 4: Dreadnought Battleships". Warship International. LIV (4): 307–343. ISSN 0043-0374.
- Trawick, Henry P. & Wiltering, John H. Jr. (2010). "Italian Monitor Faa di Bruno". Warship International. XLVII (4). Toledo, Ohio: International Navy Research Organization: 297–298. ISSN 0043-0374.
