= Small nucleolar RNA SNORD58 =

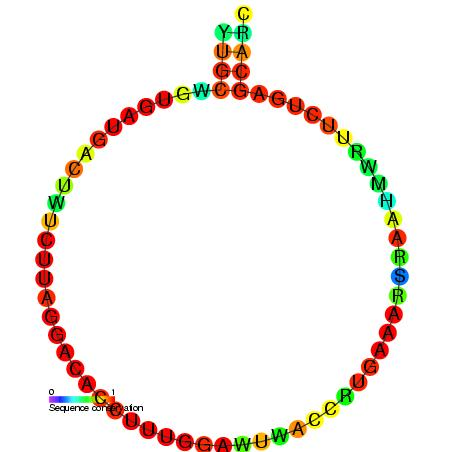
- Predicted secondary structure and sequence conservation of SNORD58

Identifiers
- Symbol: SNORD58
- Alt. Symbols: U58
- Rfam: RF00151

Other data
- RNA type: Gene; snRNA; snoRNA; CD-box
- Domain: Eukaryota
- GO: GO:0006396 GO:0005730
- SO: SO:0000593
- PDB structures: PDBe

In molecular biology, snoRNA U58 (also known as SNORD58) is a non-coding RNA (ncRNA) molecule which functions in the modification of other small nuclear RNAs (snRNAs). This type of modifying RNA is usually located in the nucleolus of the eukaryotic cell which is a major site of snRNA biogenesis. It is known as a small nucleolar RNA (snoRNA) and also often referred to as a guide RNA.

snoRNA U57 belongs to the C/D box class of snoRNAs which contain the conserved sequence motifs known as the C box (UGAUGA) and the D box (CUGA). Most of the members of the box C/D family function in directing site-specific 2'-O-methylation of substrate RNAs.

In the human genome there are two closely related copies of U58 (called U58A and U58B). They are both encoded in the introns of the ribosomal protein RPL17 gene. Both snoRNAs are predicted to guide 2'O-ribose methylation of the large 28S ribosomal RNA (rRNA) subunit on residue G4198.
