= Small nucleolar RNA SNORD63 =

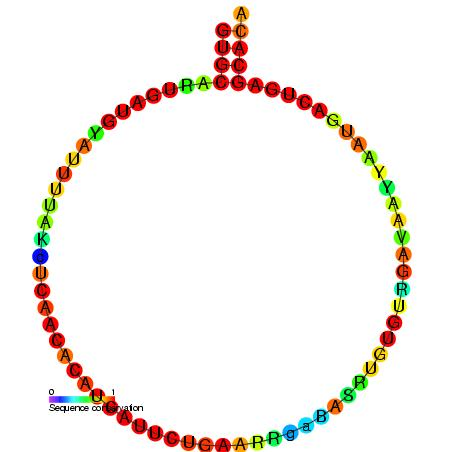
- Predicted secondary structure and sequence conservation of SNORD63

Identifiers
- Symbol: SNORD63
- Alt. Symbols: U63
- Rfam: RF00154

Other data
- RNA type: Gene; snRNA; snoRNA; CD-box
- Domain: Eukaryota
- GO: GO:0006396 GO:0005730
- SO: SO:0000593
- PDB structures: PDBe

In molecular biology, snoRNA U63 (also known as SNORD63) is a non-coding RNA (ncRNA) molecule which functions in the modification of other small nuclear RNAs (snRNAs). This type of modifying RNA is usually located in the nucleolus of the eukaryotic cell which is a major site of snRNA biogenesis. It is known as a small nucleolar RNA (snoRNA) and also often referred to as a guide RNA.

snoRNA U63 belongs to the C/D box class of snoRNAs which contain the conserved sequence motifs known as the C box (UGAUGA) and the D box (CUGA). Most of the members of the box C/D family function in directing site-specific 2'-O-methylation of substrate RNAs.

snoRNA U63 was purified from HeLa cells by immunoprecipitation with antifibrillarin antibody. It is predicted to guide the 2'-O-ribose methylation of 28s ribosomal RNA (rRNA) at residue A4531.
