= SS Ardmore (1909) =

Irish pre-WWI cargo ship

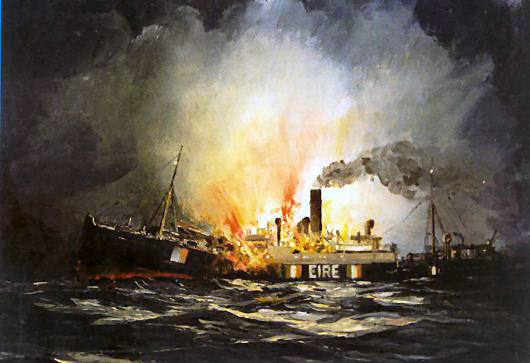
- SS Ardmore II sinking after hitting a mine on 12 November 1940 (nearly 23 years after the first Ardmore). This ship was built in memory of the first SS Ardmore and looked identical to her.

History

United Kingdom
- Name: SS Ardmore
- Owner: City of Cork Steam Packet Co. Ltd.
- Port of registry: Cork
- Route: London – Cork
- Ordered: 1909
- Builder: Caledon Shipbuilding & Engineering Co. Ltd.
- Yard number: 206
- Laid down: 1909
- Launched: 20 February 1909
- Completed: 1909
- Acquired: 1909
- Maiden voyage: 1909
- In service: 1909
- Identification: HNVK; Official number: 128301
- Fate: Torpedoed and sunk 13 November 1917

General characteristics
- Type: Cargo ship
- Tonnage: 1,304 GRT
- Length: 79.3 metres (260 ft 2 in)
- Beam: 11 metres (36 ft 1 in)
- Depth: 5.2 metres (17 ft 1 in)
- Installed power: Triple Expansion Engine
- Propulsion: Screw propeller
- Speed: 12.5 knots
- Crew: 27

SS Ardmore was a British cargo ship that was torpedoed by SM U-95 in St. George's Channel 13 nautical miles (24 km) west south west of the Coningbeg Lightship on 13 November 1917 while carrying general cargo from London, United Kingdom to Cork, Ireland.

== Construction ==
Ardmore was built at the Caledon Shipbuilding & Engineering Co. Ltd. shipyard in Dundee, United Kingdom in 1909. She was launched and completed that same year. The ship was 79.3 metres (260 ft 2 in) long, had a beam of 11 metres (36 ft 1 in) and had a depth of 5.2 metres (17 ft 1 in). She was assessed at 1,304 GRT and had a triple expansion engine driving a screw propeller. The ship could reach a maximum speed of 12.5 knots.

== Sinking ==
Ardmore left London bound for Cork carrying general cargo. When she was 13 miles west south west from Coningbeg Lightship in the St. George's Channel on 13 November 1917 she was torpedoed and sunk without warning by the German submarine SM U-95. Of the 27 crew on board, only eight were rescued.
