= SM UB-63 =

German submarine

- UB-148 at sea, a U-boat similar to UB-63.

History

German Empire
- Name: UB-63
- Ordered: 20 May 1916
- Builder: AG Vulcan, Hamburg
- Cost: 3,279,000 German Papiermark
- Yard number: 88
- Launched: 26 May 1917
- Commissioned: 23 July 1917
- Fate: Sunk 28 January 1918

General characteristics
- Class & type: Type UB III submarine
- Displacement: 508 t (500 long tons) surfaced; 639 t (629 long tons) submerged
- Length: 55.52 m (182 ft 2 in) (o/a)
- Beam: 5.76 m (18 ft 11 in)
- Draught: 3.70 m (12 ft 2 in)
- Propulsion: 2 × propeller shaft; 2 × MAN four-stroke 6-cylinder diesel engines, 1,085 bhp (809 kW); 2 × Siemens-Schuckert electric motors, 780 shp (580 kW)
- Speed: 13.3 knots (24.6 km/h; 15.3 mph) surfaced; 7.8 knots (14.4 km/h; 9.0 mph) submerged
- Range: 8,420 nmi (15,590 km; 9,690 mi) at 6 knots (11 km/h; 6.9 mph) surfaced; 55 nmi (102 km; 63 mi) at 4 knots (7.4 km/h; 4.6 mph) submerged
- Test depth: 50 m (160 ft)
- Complement: 3 officers, 31 men
- Armament: 5 × 50 cm (19.7 in) torpedo tubes (4 bow, 1 stern); 10 torpedoes; 1 × 8.8 cm (3.46 in) deck gun

Service record
- Part of: II Flotilla; 4 – 30 September 1917; V Flotilla; 30 September 1917 – 28 January 1918
- Commanders: Kptlt. Rudolf Gebeschus; 23 July 1917 – 28 January 1918
- Operations: 3 patrols
- Victories: 2 merchant ships sunk (4,481 GRT); 1 merchant ship damaged (1,113 GRT); 1 merchant ship taken as prize (3,290 GRT)

SM UB-63 was a German Type UB III submarine or U-boat in the German Imperial Navy (German: Kaiserliche Marine) during World War I. She was commissioned into the German Imperial Navy on 23 July 1917 as SM UB-63. (Note: "SM" stands for "Seiner Majestät" (English: His Majesty's) and combined with the U for Unterseeboot would be translated as His Majesty's Submarine.)

UB-63 was sunk on 28 January 1918 by British warships HMS W.S. Bailey and HMS Fort George at 56°10′N 2°0′E with depth charges. All 33 crew members perished in the attack.

== Construction ==
UB-63 was ordered by the GIN on 20 May 1916.

She was built by AG Vulcan of Hamburg and following just under a year of construction, launched at Hamburg on 26 May 1917. UB-63 was commissioned later that same year. Like all Type UB III submarines, UB-63 carried 10 torpedoes and was armed with a 8.8 cm (3.46 in) deck gun. UB-63 would carry a crew of up to 3 officer and 31 men and had a cruising range of 8,420 nautical miles (15,590 km; 9,690 mi). UB-63 had a displacement of 508 t (500 long tons) while surfaced and 639 t (629 long tons) when submerged. Her engines enabled her to travel at 13.3 knots (24.6 km/h; 15.3 mph) when surfaced and 8 knots (15 km/h; 9.2 mph) when submerged.

== Summary of raiding history ==
Date	Name	Nationality	Tonnage (Note: Tonnages are in gross register tons)	Fate
15 September 1917	Santaren	United Kingdom	4,256	Sunk
3 November 1917	Haelen	Belgium	3,290	Captured as prize
8 November 1917	Lindhardt	Denmark	225	Sunk
15 November 1917	Stargard	Norway	1,113	Damaged

== Bibliography ==
- Bendert, Harald (2000). Die UB-Boote der Kaiserlichen Marine, 1914-1918. Einsätze, Erfolge, Schicksal (in German). Hamburg: Verlag E.S. Mittler & Sohn GmbH. ISBN 3-8132-0713-7.
- Gröner, Erich; Jung, Dieter; Maass, Martin (1991). U-boats and Mine Warfare Vessels. German Warships 1815–1945. Vol. 2. Translated by Thomas, Keith; Magowan, Rachel. London: Conway Maritime Press. ISBN 0-85177-593-4.
- Rössler, Eberhard (1979). Die deutschen U-Boote und ihre Werften: eine Bilddokumentation über den deutschen U-Bootbau; in zwei Bänden (in German). Vol. I. Munich: Bernard & Graefe. ISBN 3-7637-5213-7.
