= SM UB-58 =

- UB-148 at sea, a U-boat similar to UB-58.

History

German Empire
- Name: UB-58
- Ordered: 20 May 1916
- Builder: AG Weser, Bremen
- Cost: 3,276,000 German Papiermark
- Yard number: 270
- Laid down: 13 September 1916
- Launched: 5 July 1917
- Commissioned: 10 August 1917
- Fate: Sunk 10 March 1918 at 50°58′N 01°14′E by a mine, 35 dead

General characteristics
- Class & type: Type UB III submarine
- Displacement: 516 t (508 long tons) surfaced; 646 t (636 long tons; 712 short tons) submerged
- Length: 55.85 m (183 ft 3 in) (o/a)
- Beam: 5.80 m (19 ft)
- Draught: 3.72 m (12 ft 2 in)
- Propulsion: 2 × propeller shaft; 2 × Körting four-stroke 6-cylinder diesel engines, 1,050 bhp (780 kW); 2 × Siemens-Schuckert electric motors, 780 shp (580 kW)
- Speed: 13.4 knots (24.8 km/h; 15.4 mph) surfaced; 7.8 knots (14.4 km/h; 9.0 mph) submerged
- Range: 9,020 nmi (16,710 km; 10,380 mi) at 6 knots (11 km/h; 6.9 mph) surfaced; 55 nmi (102 km; 63 mi) at 4 knots (7.4 km/h; 4.6 mph) submerged
- Test depth: 50 m (160 ft)
- Complement: 3 officers, 31 men
- Armament: 5 × 50 cm (19.7 in) torpedo tubes (4 bow, 1 stern); 10 torpedoes; 1 × 8.8 cm (3.46 in) deck gun

Service record
- Part of: Flandern I Flotilla; 15 October 1917 – 10 March 1918
- Commanders: Oblt.z.S. / Kptlt. Werner Fürbringer; 10 August 1917 – 7 February 1918; Oblt.z.S. Werner Löwe; 8 February – 10 March 1918
- Operations: 6 patrols
- Victories: 8 merchant ships sunk (8,198 GRT)

SM UB-58 was a German Type UB III submarine or U-boat in the German Imperial Navy (German: Kaiserliche Marine) during World War I. She was commissioned into the Flanders Flotilla of the German Imperial Navy on 10 August 1917 as SM UB-58. (Note: "SM" stands for "Seiner Majestät" (English: His Majesty's) and combined with the U for Unterseeboot would be translated as His Majesty's Submarine.)

She operated as part of the Flanders Flotilla based in Zeebrugge. UB-58 was sunk at 04:15 on 10 March 1918 at 50°58′N 01°14′E after striking a mine, with 35 crew members losing their lives.

== Construction ==
She was built by AG Weser, Bremen and following just under a year of construction, launched at Bremen on 10 July 1917. UB-58 was commissioned later that same year. Like all Type UB III submarines, UB-58 carried 10 torpedoes and was armed with a 8.8 cm (3.46 in) deck gun. UB-58 would carry a crew of up to three officers and 31 men and had a cruising range of 9,020 nautical miles (16,710 km; 10,380 mi). UB-58 had a displacement of 516 t (508 long tons) while surfaced and 646 t (636 long tons; 712 short tons) when submerged. Her engines enabled her to travel at 13.4 knots (24.8 km/h; 15.4 mph) when surfaced and 7.8 knots (14.4 km/h; 9.0 mph) when submerged.

== Summary of raiding history ==
| Date | Name | Nationality | Tonnage (Note: Tonnages are in gross register tons) | Fate |
|---|---|---|---|---|
| 13 October 1917 | Bethel | Norway | 257 | Sunk |
| 13 October 1917 | Esmeralda | Sweden | 830 | Sunk |
| 19 November 1917 | Minnie Coles | United Kingdom | 116 | Sunk |
| 19 December 1917 | Saint Andre | France | 2,457 | Sunk |
| 22 December 1917 | Clan Cameron | United Kingdom | 3,595 | Sunk |
| 22 December 1917 | Start | Norway | 728 | Sunk |
| 26 January 1918 | Louie Bell | United Kingdom | 118 | Sunk |
| 28 January 1918 | W. H. L. | United Kingdom | 97 | Sunk |

== Bibliography ==
- Bendert, Harald (2000). Die UB-Boote der Kaiserlichen Marine, 1914-1918. Einsätze, Erfolge, Schicksal (in German). Hamburg: Verlag E.S. Mittler & Sohn GmbH. ISBN 3-8132-0713-7.
- Gröner, Erich; Jung, Dieter; Maass, Martin (1991). U-boats and Mine Warfare Vessels. German Warships 1815–1945. Vol. 2. Translated by Thomas, Keith; Magowan, Rachel. London: Conway Maritime Press. ISBN 0-85177-593-4.
- Rössler, Eberhard (1979). Die deutschen U-Boote und ihre Werften: eine Bilddokumentation über den deutschen U-Bootbau; in zwei Bänden (in German). Vol. I. Munich: Bernard & Graefe. ISBN 3-7637-5213-7.
