= HMS M15 =

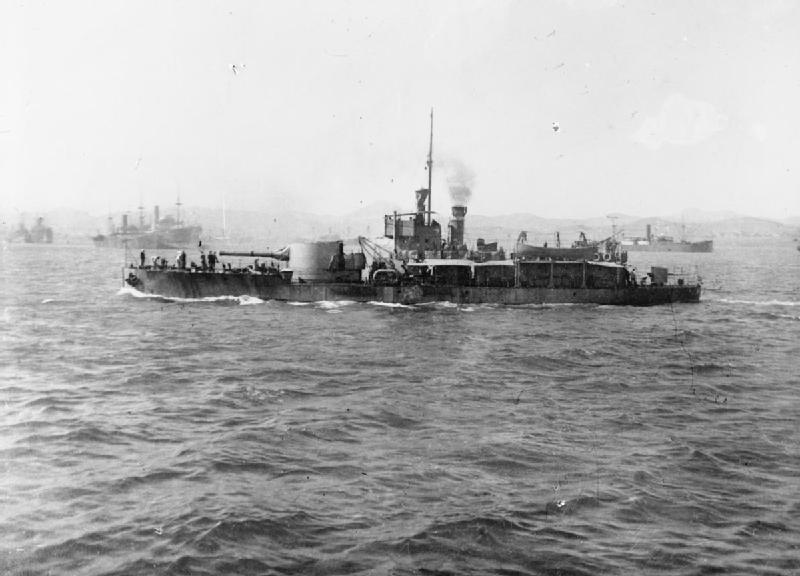
- M15 at Mudros, 1916

History

United Kingdom
- Name: M15
- Builder: William Gray, Hartlepool.
- Laid down: 1 March 1915
- Launched: 28 April 1915
- Fate: Sunk on 11 November 1917.

General characteristics
- Class & type: M15-class monitor
- Displacement: 540 tons
- Length: 177 ft 3 in (54.03 m)
- Beam: 31 ft (9.4 m)
- Draught: 6 ft 9 in (2.06 m)
- Propulsion: 2 shaft; Triple expansion steam engines; 800 hp (600 kW)
- Speed: 11 knots (20 km/h; 13 mph)
- Complement: 69
- Armament: As built; 1 × BL 9.2-inch Mk X gun; 1 × 12 pdr (76 mm) QF Mk 1 gun; 1 × 6 pdr (57 mm) QF MK 1 AA gun

HMS M15 was a First World War Royal Navy M15-class monitor. She was sunk off Gaza by UC-38 on 11 November 1917.

== Design ==
Intended as a shore bombardment vessel, M15's primary armament was a single 9.2-inch Mk X gun which had been held as a spare for the Drake and Cressy-class cruisers. In addition to her 9.2-inch gun, she also possessed one 12-pounder and one six-pound anti-aircraft gun. She was equipped with triple expansion steam engines rated to 800 horsepower (600 kW) that allowed a top speed of 11 knots (20 km/h; 13 mph). The monitor's crew consisted of sixty-nine officers and ratings.

== Construction ==
M15 was ordered in March 1915, as part of the War Emergency Programme of ship construction. She was laid down at the William Gray shipyard at Hartlepool in March 1915 and launched on 28 April 1915. The vessel was completed in June 1915.

== First World War ==
M15 was towed to Malta in July 1915, where she received her main armament. She then proceeded to Mudros, and later was involved in the defence of the Suez Canal.

After bombarding Gaza as part of the Third Battle of Gaza, on 11 November 1917, M15 and the destroyer HMS Staunch were torpedoed by the submarine UC-38. 26 men lost their lives in the sinking of M15, one kilometre (0.62 mi) from shore, in 90 metres (300 ft) of water.

== Hamas recovery of ammunition ==
In 2020, Hamas divers recovered ammunition, including large-calibre naval shells, from the wreck of M15 with the intent of using explosives from the shells to make warheads and gunpowder propellant to make rocket fuel. After more than a century at the bottom of the sea, while Israeli sources claim the material was found to be unusable Hamas published a video of their members using it to make rockets .
