= Italian monitor Alfredo Cappellini =

Coordinates: 43°38′51″N 13°26′49″E

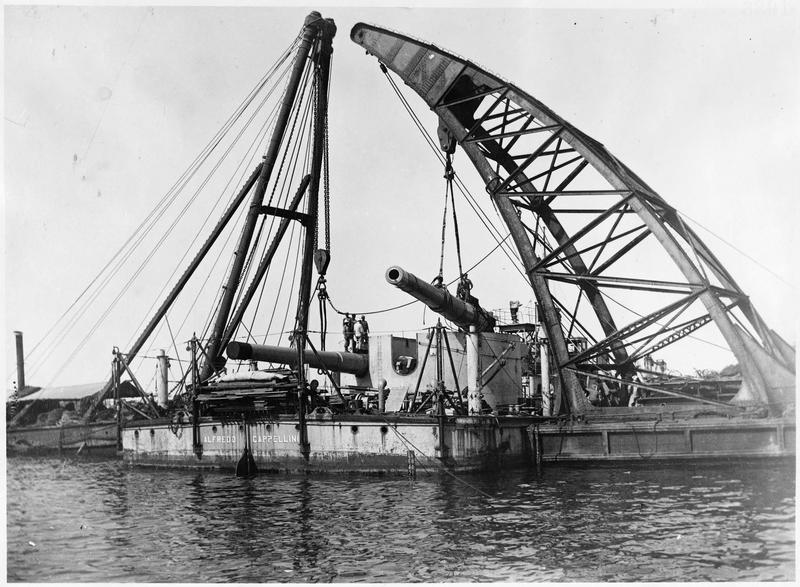

Class overview
- Built: 1915–16
- In commission: 1916–17
- Completed: 1
- Lost: 1

History

Kingdom of Italy
- Name: Alfredo Cappellini
- Builder: Cantiere navale fratelli Orlando, Livorno
- Launched: 24 April 1916
- Completed: 28 April 1916
- Fate: Wrecked 16 November 1917

General characteristics
- Displacement: 1,452 tonnes (1,429 long tons; 1,601 short tons) (standard)
- Length: 36 m (118 ft 1 in)
- Beam: 18 m (59 ft 1 in)
- Draught: 2.4 m (7 ft 10 in)
- Installed power: 265 ihp (198 kW)
- Propulsion: 1 shaft, 1 double-expansion steam engine
- Speed: about 3.2 knots (5.9 km/h; 3.7 mph) (trials)
- Armament: 2 × 1 - 381 mm (15 in) guns

Alfredo Cappellini was an Italian monitor converted from the floating crane GA53 during World War I. She bombarded Austro-Hungarian positions during the Eleventh Battle of the Isonzo in 1917 before she lost in a storm off Ancona on 16 November 1917.

== Development and description ==
Alfredo Cappellini was built when Cannone navali da 381/40 guns from the Francesco Caracciolo-class battleships became available after their construction was suspended in 1916. Her guns were built by Ansaldo-Schneider and originally destined for the Francesco Morosini. Converted from the floating crane GA53, she displaced 1,452 long tons (1,475 t), with a length between perpendiculars of 36 meters (118 ft 1 in), a beam of 18 meters (59 ft 1 in) and a draft of 2.4 meters (7 ft 10 in). The ship was powered by one 265-indicated-horsepower (198 kW) vertical double-expansion steam engine. On sea trials the ship reached a maximum speed of 3.76 knots (7.0 km/h; 4.3 mph), but her maximum speed in regular service was about 3.5 knots (6.5 km/h; 4.0 mph).

Her hull and gun turret were unarmored, but she was protected by two anti-torpedo nets. Her main guns could elevate 20° and her turret could traverse 30° to either side. They fired an 884 kg (1,949 lb) armor-piercing shell at a muzzle velocity of 700 m/s (2,297 ft/s) to a range of 27,300 m (89,567 ft) at maximum elevation.

== Service ==
Alfredo Cappellini was launched in 1916, even before the battleships were officially suspended, by the Orlando Shipyard, in Livorno, completed on 24 April 1917 and commissioned four days later. Her first action came during the Eleventh Battle of the Isonzo in August 1917. She, in company with the Italian monitor Faà di Bruno and the British monitors HMS Earl of Peterborough and HMS Sir Thomas Picton, bombarded Austrian positions with little noticeable effect. She foundered in a storm off Ancona on 16 November 1917, with the loss of 69 of her 73 crew.

== Bibliography ==
- Clerici, Carlo; Robbins, Charles B.; Flocchini, Alfredo (1999). "The 15" (381mm)/40 Guns of the Francesco Caracciolo Class Battleships". Warship International. 36 (2). Toledo, OH: International Naval Research Organization: 151–157. ISSN 0043-0374.
- Fraccaroli, Aldo (1970). Italian Warships of World War I. London: Ian Allan. ISBN 978-0-7110-0105-3.
- Gardiner, Robert; Gray, Randal, eds. (1985). Conway's All the World's Fighting Ships 1906–1921. Annapolis: Naval Institute Press. ISBN 0-85177-245-5.
- Ordovini, Aldo F.; Petronio, Fulvio; et al. (December 2017). "Capital Ships of the Royal Italian Navy, 1860–1918: Part 4: Dreadnought Battleships". Warship International. LIV (4): 307–343. ISSN 0043-0374.
- Trawick, Henry P.; Wiltering, John H. Jr. (2010). "Italian Monitor Faa di Bruno". Warship International. XLVII (4). Toledo, OH: International Navy Research Organization: 297–298. ISSN 0043-0374.
