= List of shipwrecks in August 1917 =

The list of shipwrecks in August 1917 includes ships sunk, foundered, grounded, or otherwise lost during August 1917.

== 1 August ==
List of shipwrecks: 1 August 1917
Ship	State	Description
Alcyone	United Kingdom	World War I: The coaster was shelled and sunk in the English Channel 45 nautical miles (83 km) north north west of the Roches-Douvres Lighthouse, Côtes-du-Nord, France by SM UB-31 (Imperial German Navy). Her crew survived.
Alexandre	France	World War I: The four-masted barque was scuttled in the Atlantic Ocean 400 nautical miles (740 km) north of the Azores, Portugal (33°33′N 23°15′W) by SM U-155 (Imperial German Navy). Her crew survived.
Charlotte W. Miller	United States	The schooner sank on 31 July after a collision with USS D-2 (United States Navy) near Bartletts Reef near New London, Connecticut. She was towed to the vicinity of Sarahs Ledge in Long Island Sound by USS Ontario (United States Navy) where she sank again on 1 August. Raised and towed to New London, Connecticut, declared a total loss.
Giacinto Pullino	Italian Royal Navy	The captured Pullino-class submarine sank in the Adriatic Sea while under tow to Pola by Austro-Hungarian forces. Her wreck was refloated on 28 February 1931 and scrapped in 1931.
Hersing	Imperial German Navy	World War I: The Greier-class Vorpostenboot was sunk by mines south east of Gjedser.
Karina	United Kingdom	World War I: The passenger ship was torpedoed and sunk in the Irish Sea 17 nautical miles (31 km) south south west of Hook Point, County Waterford by SM UC-75 (Imperial German Navy) with the loss of eleven lives.
Laertes	United Kingdom	World War I: The cargo ship was torpedoed and sunk in the English Channel 1.25 nautical miles (2.32 km) south of Prawle Point, Devon by SM UB-31 (Imperial German Navy) with the loss of 14 of her crew.
HMHS Letitia	Royal Navy	The hospital ship ran aground and sank in Portuguese Cove, Nova Scotia, Canada with the loss of one life. She was on a voyage from Liverpool, Lancashire to Halifax, Nova Scotia.
Llandudno	United Kingdom	World War I: The cargo ship was scuttled in the Mediterranean Sea 110 nautical miles (200 km) west by north of Porquerolles, Var, France by SM U-33 (Imperial German Navy) with the loss of a crew member.
HMT Nina	Royal Navy	World War I: The naval trawler truck a mine and sank in the English Channel off Prawle Point with some loss of life.
Rokeby	United Kingdom	World War I: The cargo ship struck a mine and sank in the Mediterranean Sea 1.5 nautical miles (2.8 km) south west of Porquerolles. Her crew survived.

== 2 August ==
List of shipwrecks: 2 August 1917
Ship	State	Description
USS Arvilla	United States Navy	The patrol boat collided with the fishing vessel Higo (United States) at San Diego, California and sank. She was later raised, repaired and returned to service.
Aurum	United States	The 26-gross register ton, 50-foot (15.2 m) sternwheel cargo ship struck an obstruction and was lost near Golovin, Territory of Alaska.
HMS Ermine	Royal Navy	World War I: The fleet messenger struck a mine and sank in the Aegean Sea (40°39′N 23°34′E) (wrong coordinates) with the loss of 24 of her crew.
Libia	France	World War I: The cargo ship was sunk in the Atlantic Ocean 70 nautical miles (130 km) west of Penmarc'h, Finistère (47°49′N 5°55′W) by SM U-61 (Imperial German Navy) with the loss of 24 crew.
Marthe	France	World War I: The barque was scuttled in the Atlantic Ocean south south east of the Azores, Portugal (33°38′N 23°30′W) by SM U-155 (Imperial German Navy) with the loss of a crew member.
Newlyn	United Kingdom	World War I: The cargo ship was torpedoed and sunk in the English Channel 2 nautical miles (3.7 km) south of Prawle Point, Devon by SM UB-31 (Imperial German Navy) with the loss of four of her crew.
SMS Seeadler	Imperial German Navy	SMS Seeadler The auxiliary cruiser was wrecked when driven ashore by a tidal wave on Maupihaa, French Polynesia. Her crew survived.
Teesdale	United Kingdom	The cargo ship foundered in the North Sea three nautical miles (5.6 km) north of Saltburn-by-the-Sea, Yorkshire.
Young Bert	United Kingdom	World War I: The fishing vessel was scuttled in the North Sea off the mouth of the Humber by SM UC-63 (Imperial German Navy) with the loss of all hands.

== 3 August ==
List of shipwrecks: 3 August 1917
Ship	State	Description
Aube	United Kingdom	World War I: The cargo ship was torpedoed and sunk in the Bay of Biscay 3.5 nautical miles (6.5 km) north west of the Île d'Yeu, Vendée, France (46°56′N 2°28′W) by SM UC-71 (Imperial German Navy) with the loss of one of her 30 crew. Survivors were rescued by Bouvreuil (French Navy).
Beechpark	United Kingdom	World War I: The cargo ship was torpedoed and sunk in the Atlantic Ocean 4 nautical miles (7.4 km) south of St Mary's, Isles of Scilly (49°51′N 6°17′W) by SM UC-75 (Imperial German Navy). Her crew survived.
Halldor	Norway	World War I: The cargo ship was scuttled in the Atlantic Ocean 90 nautical miles (170 km) west of Gibraltar (36°58′N 6°51′W) by SM U-39 (Imperial German Navy). Her crew survived.
Hornchurch	United Kingdom	World War I: The cargo ship struck a mine and sank in the North Sea 3.5 nautical miles (6.5 km) north east of Coquet Island, Northumberland with the loss of two of her crew.
Renée Marthe	France	World War I: The sailing vessel was sunk in the English Channel west of Prawle Point, Devon, United Kingdom by SM UB-31 (Imperial German Navy).
San Nicola	Italy	World War I: The sailing vessel was sunk in the Mediterranean Sea by SM UC-226 (Imperial German Navy).

== 4 August ==
List of shipwrecks: 4 August 1917
Ship	State	Description
Angelina T.	Italy	World War I: The brigantine was shelled and sunk in the Mediterranean Sea north of Cape Corse, Corsica, France (42°41′N 10°04′E) by SM U-33 (Imperial German Navy).
Azira	United Kingdom	World War I: The cargo ship was torpedoed and sunk in the North Sea 6 nautical miles (11 km) south east of Seaham, County Durham by SM UB-22 (Imperial German Navy) with the loss of a crew member.
British Monarch	United Kingdom	World War I: The cargo ship struck a mine and sank in the Mediterranean Sea 2 nautical miles (3.7 km) south south west of Porquerolles, Var, France. Her crew survived.
Cairnstrath	United Kingdom	World War I: the cargo ship was torpedoed and sunk in the Bay of Biscay 6 nautical miles (11 km) south south west of the Île du Pilier, Vendée, France (47°00′N 2°29′W) by SM UC-71 (Imperial German Navy) with the loss of 22 of her 23 crew. The survivor was rescued by Victoire (France).
Countess of Mar	United Kingdom	World War I: The cargo ship was torpedoed and sunk in the Bay of Biscay 55 nautical miles (102 km) north of Bayonne, Basses-Pyrénées, France (44°27′N 1°48′W) by SM U-61 (Imperial German Navy) with the loss of 20 crew.
SM UC-44	Imperial German Navy	World War I: The Type UC II submarine was sunk by one of her own mines off the coast of Ireland (52°07′N 6°59′W) with the loss of 25 of 26 crew; its commander, Kurt Tebenjohanns, was the sole survivor. The wreck was raised in September 1917 and scrapped.

== 5 August ==
List of shipwrecks: 5 August 1917
Ship	State	Description
HMT Bovic	Royal Navy	The 107-foot (33 m), 162-ton minesweeping naval trawler was sunk in a collision with Vigdis (Norway) off Souter Point, north of Whitburn, South Tyneside, England.
HMS Bracondale	Royal Navy	World War I: The Q-ship was damaged in the Atlantic Ocean 120 nautical miles (220 km) north west of Tory Island, County Donegal by SM U-44 (Imperial German Navy) with the loss of a crew member. She was taken in tow, but sank on 7 August.
Campo Libre	Spain	World War I: The fishing vessel was sunk in the Bay of Biscay 40 nautical miles (74 km) off Bilbao, Biscay (44°10′N 2°45′W) by SM U-61 (Imperial German Navy).
Kathleen	United Kingdom	World War I: The cargo ship was torpedoed and sunk in the Atlantic Ocean 90 nautical miles (170 km) west of the Skellig Islands, County Kerry (52°10′N 12°20′W) by SM U-100 (Imperial German Navy) with the loss of a crew member.
Ryton	United Kingdom	World War I: The cargo ship rammed SM U-39 (Imperial German Navy) in the Atlantic Ocean (35°57′N 7°07′W) and sank due to damage received. Her crew survived.
Sauternes	France	World War I: The coaster was sunk in the Bay of Biscay 9 nautical miles (17 km) off Cap Ferret, Nouvelle Aquitaine by SM U-61 (Imperial German Navy).

== 6 August ==
List of shipwrecks: 6 August 1917
Ship	State	Description
Alfred	France	World War I: The sailing vessel was sunk in the North Sea off Dunkirk, Nord by SM UC-63 (Imperial German Navy).
Argalia	United Kingdom	World War I: The cargo ship was torpedoed and sunk in the Atlantic Ocean 81 nautical miles (150 km) north west by west of Tory Island, County Donegal by SM U-94 (Imperial German Navy) with the loss of three of her crew.
Baysoto	United Kingdom	World War I: The cargo ship was torpedoed and sunk in the North Sea 33 nautical miles (61 km) south east by east of Girdleness, Aberdeenshire (56°58′N 1°50′W) by SM UC-42 (Imperial German Navy). Her crew survived.
Bill	United States	The 624-ton scow barge sank at St. Michael, Territory of Alaska.
Campana	United States	World War I: The tanker was captured and sunk with explosives in the Atlantic Ocean 143 nautical miles (265 km) off the Île de Ré, Charente Maritime, France (46°08′N 5°30′W) by SM U-61 (Imperial German Navy). Two or six survivors were taken as prisoners of war. The rest of the crew were rescued from lifeboats by Audacieuse (French Navy)
El Kaddra Nr. 53	Tunisia	World War I: The boat was sunk in the Mediterranean Sea by SM UC-27 (Imperial German Navy).
Eugenia	Italy	World War I: The cargo ship was sunk in the Atlantic Ocean 7.5 nautical miles (13.9 km) west north west of the Fastnet Rock by SM U-55 (Imperial German Navy). Her crew survived.
Fane	Norway	World War I: The cargo ship struck a mine and sank in the North Sea off the Inner Dowsing Lightship (United Kingdom) (53°21′N 0°38′E) with the loss of four of her crew.
Jenny	Denmark	World War I: The brig was scuttled in the North Sea 25 nautical miles (46 km) east north east of Hartlepool, County Durham, United Kingdom (54°55′N 0°53′W) by SM UB-22 (Imperial German Navy). Her crew survived.
Lucky	United States	The 8-gross register ton, 33.6-foot (10.2 m) fishing vessel sank near Cape Fox (54°46′10″N 130°50′45″W) in Southeast Alaska. All three people on board survived.
Mamook	United States	The 17-gross register ton, 42-foot (12.8 m) motor vessel was destroyed by fire at Eagle Reef (58°27′40″N 134°49′15″W) in Southeast Alaska. The two people on board survived.
Matunga	United Kingdom	World War I: The cargo ship was scuttled in the Pacific Ocean 300 nautical miles (560 km) east of Riche Island, New Guinea by SMS Wolf (Imperial German Navy).
Narcissus	United Kingdom	World War I: The drifter was scuttled in the North Sea 12 nautical miles (22 km) south east of the mouth of the River Tyne (54°55′N 1°05′W) by SM UB-22 (Imperial German Navy). Her crew survived.
Polanna	United Kingdom	World War I: The cargo ship was torpedoed and sunk in the North Sea 3 nautical miles (5.6 km) east of Whitby, Yorkshire by SM UC-40 (Imperial German Navy) with the loss of two of her crew.
Rosemount	United Kingdom	World War I: The cargo ship was torpedoed and sunk in the North Sea 45 nautical miles (83 km) north east by north of Muckle Flugga, Shetland Islands by SM U-101 (Imperial German Navy) with the loss of a crew member.
Talisman	United Kingdom	World War I: The cargo ship was scuttled in the North Sea 7 nautical miles (13 km) east south east of Hartlepool (54°44′N 1°10′W) by SM UB-41 (Imperial German Navy). Her crew survived.

== 7 August ==
List of shipwrecks: 7 August 1917
Ship	State	Description
Blesvig	United Kingdom	The cargo ship collided with another vessel and sank.
Christiane	United States	World War I: The barque was scuttled in the Atlantic Ocean 200 nautical miles (370 km) east of São Miguel Island, Azores, Portugal (37°40′N 20°40′W) by SM U-155 (Imperial German Navy). Her crew survived.
Esemplare	Italy	World War I: The cargo ship was sunk in the Mediterranean Sea (35°00′N 11°37′E) by SM UC-27 (Imperial German Navy).
Iran	United Kingdom	World War I: The cargo ship was torpedoed and sunk in the Atlantic Ocean 200 nautical miles (370 km) east south east of Santa Maria Island, Azores by SM U-155 (Imperial German Navy). Her crew survived.
Jarl	Sweden	World War I: The cargo ship was torpedoed and sunk in the Atlantic Ocean 130 nautical miles (240 km) south west of the Faroe Islands (59°45′N 9°28′W) by SM U-22 (Imperial German Navy). The ship had previously been taken by a British prize crew for visitation in a British port. One of the British prize crew was killed by the explosion.
Onesta	Italy	World War I: The cargo ship was sunk in the North Sea off the Inner Dowsing Lightship (United Kingdom) by SM UC-63 (Imperial German Navy). Her crew survived.
Othalia	Sweden	World War I: The cargo ship was torpedoed and damaged in the North Sea 50 nautical miles (93 km) east of the Orkney Islands, United Kingdom (59°00′N 0°58′W) by SM UC-30 (Imperial German Navy). Othalia was towed in to Kirkwall where she was declared a constructive total loss. Subsequently fitted with a new stern section and returned to service.
Port Curtis	United Kingdom	World War I: The cargo ship was scuttled in the Atlantic Ocean 70 nautical miles (130 km) west of Penmarc'h, Finistère, France (47°30′N 6°00′W) by SM UC-71 (Imperial German Navy). Her crew survived.
Trento	Italy	World War I: The cargo ship was captured and scuttled in the Atlantic Ocean 150 nautical miles (280 km) west north west of Ouessant, Finistère by SM U-61 (Imperial German Navy).

== 8 August ==
List of shipwrecks: 8 August 1917
Ship	State	Description
Berlengas	Portugal	World War I: The cargo ship was torpedoed and sunk in the Bay of Biscay 90 nautical miles (170 km) south west of Ouessant, Finistère, France (47°00′N 5°15′W) by SM UC-77 (Imperial German Navy).
Breton	France	World War I: The cargo ship was sunk in the Mediterranean Sea (37°30′N 9°19′E) by SM UC-37 (Imperial German Navy). Her crew survived.
George A. Marsh	United States	The schooner sank in Lake Ontario during a storm with the loss of twelve lives.
HMS Dunraven	Royal Navy	HMS Dunraven World War I: The Q-ship was torpedoed and shelled in the Bay of Biscay off Ouessant, Finistère, France by SM UC-71 (Imperial German Navy) with the loss of a crew member. Survivors were rescued by HMS Christopher (Royal Navy). HMS Dunraven sank on 10 August.
Llanishen	United Kingdom	World War I: The cargo ship was torpedoed and sunk in the Mediterranean Sea 8 nautical miles (15 km) north by east of Cape Creus, Spain 42°25′N 3°20′E) by SM U-33 (Imperial German Navy) with the loss of two crew.
Marie Jesus Protegez Nous	France	World War I: The sailing vessel was sunk in the North Sea off Lowestoft, Suffolk, United Kingdom by SM UC-63 (Imperial German Navy).

== 9 August ==
List of shipwrecks: 9 August 1917
Ship	State	Description
Agne	Sweden	World War I: The cargo ship was torpedoed and sunk in the North Sea at (60°46′N 3°32′E) by SM U-60 (Imperial German Navy). Her crew survived.
Alfonso	Italy	World War I: The sailing vessel was sunk in the Mediterranean Sea (37°25′N 12°05′E) by SM UC-35 (Imperial German Navy).
Blagdon	United Kingdom	World War I: The cargo ship was torpedoed and damaged in the North Sea 75 nautical miles (139 km) east by south of Muckle Flugga, Shetland Islands by SM U-78 (Imperial German Navy) with the loss of twelve of her crew. She was abandoned by the survivors and was later sunk by SM U-100 (Imperial German Navy).
Export	Russia	World War I: The cargo ship was sunk in the North Sea 45 nautical miles (83 km) west of Sognefjord, Norway by SM U-60 (Imperial German Navy). Her crew survived.
Flora	Italy	World War I: The sailing vessel was sunk in the Gulf of Lyons by SM U-33 (Imperial German Navy).
Industria	Spain	World War I: The sailing vessel was sunk in the Gulf of Lyons by SM U-33 (Imperial German Navy).
Jack	United Kingdom	The tug was wrecked on the Bondicarr Rocks, in the North Sea off Amble, Northumberland.
Jeanne	France	The cargo ship collided with a Norwegian merchant vessel and sank. Her crew were rescued.
HMS Recruit	Royal Navy	World War I: The R-class destroyer struck a mine and sank in the North Sea with some loss of life. Another source indicates the ship was sunk by a torpedo from German submarine UB16.
S. Gerlano	Italy	World War I: The sailing vessel was sunk in the Mediterranean Sea (37°25′N 12°05′E) by SM UC-35 (Imperial German Navy). Her crew survived.

== 10 August ==
List of shipwrecks: 10 August 1917
Ship	State	Description
Capella I	Norway	World War I: The cargo ship was sunk in the Atlantic Ocean 130 nautical miles (240 km) west of Galway, United Kingdom by SM U-86 (Imperial German Navy). Her crew survived.
Koln	Imperial German Navy	The Vorpostenboot was lost on this date.
Lealta	Italy	World War I: The cargo ship was sunk in the Ionian Sea (35°45′N 16°05′E) by SM U-31 (Austro-Hungarian Navy). Her crew survived.
Margherita	Italy	World War I: The sailing vessel was sunk in the Tyrrhenian Sea by SM UC-53 (Imperial German Navy).
Orion I	Norway	World War I: The auxiliary sailing vessel was scuttled in the North Sea 30 nautical miles (56 km) off Peterhead, Aberdeenshire, United Kingdom (57°42′N 0°45′W) by SM U-62 (Imperial German Navy). Her crew survived.
Solglimt	Norway	World War I: The sailing vessel was sunk in the Atlantic Ocean 61°44′N 3°05′W) by SM U-75 (Imperial German Navy). Her crew survived.
Tito Speri	Italy	World War I: The cargo ship was sunk in the Tyrrhenian Sea off Cape Palinuro, Campania (40°01′N 15°11′E) by SM UC-53 (Imperial German Navy). She was beached at Pisciotta but was declared a constructive total loss.
War Patrol	United Kingdom	World War I: The cargo ship struck a mine and sank in the Atlantic Ocean 1 nautical mile (1.9 km) west of Penmarc'h, Finistère, France (47°48′N 4°25′W) with the loss of 14 of her 26 crew. Survivors were rescued by Taureau (French Navy).

== 11 August ==
List of shipwrecks: 11 August 1917
Ship	State	Description
City of Athens	United Kingdom	World War I: The passenger ship struck a mine and sank off Cape Town, South Africa with the loss of 19 of the 213 people on board.
Cumberland	Australia	World War I: The coastal cargo ship was damaged by a mine off Gabo Island and was beached, partially sunk on 5 July. Temporary repairs were made and she was refloated and towed off on 11 August but developed a leak in bad weather and sank five miles (8.0 km) from Green Cape. The salvage crew was rescued by Merimbula (Australia).
Gloriosa	United Kingdom	World War I: The fishing smack was scuttled in the Irish Sea 12 nautical miles (22 km) north by east of Caldey Island, Pembrokeshire by SM UC-51 (Imperial German Navy). Her crew survived.
Holar	Denmark	World War I: The coaster was torpedoed and sunk in the North Sea 3 nautical miles (5.6 km) off Lerwick, Shetland Islands, United Kingdom by SM UC-31 (Imperial German Navy) with the loss of a crew member.
HMT Jay	Royal Navy	World War I: The 119-foot (36 m), 144-ton minesweeping naval trawler was torpedoed and sunk in the North Sea off Southwold, Suffolk (55°19′N 1°49′E) by SM UB-35 (Imperial German Navy) with the loss of nine of her crew. Two or three crew and ship's dog rescued.
Sonnie	United Kingdom	World War I: The cargo ship was torpedoed and sunk in the Atlantic Ocean 5 nautical miles (9.3 km) north west of the Le Four Lighthouse, Ouessant, Finistère, France (48°34′N 4°55′W) by SM UC-77 (Imperial German Navy) with the loss of eleven of her crew.

== 12 August ==
List of shipwrecks: 12 August 1917
Ship	State	Description
Ansedonia	Italy	World War I: The barquentine was scuttled in the Tyrrhenian Sea (39°24′N 15°35′E) by SM UC-53 (Imperial German Navy). Her crew survived.
Ardita Carrara	Italy	World War I: The sailing vessel was sunk in the Tyrrhenian Sea south of Naples by SM UC-53 (Imperial German Navy). Her crew survived.
Bestum	Norway	World War I: The cargo ship was sunk in the Atlantic Ocean 150 nautical miles (280 km) west of the Bishop Rock, Isles of Scilly by SM U-93 (Imperial German Navy). Her crew survived.
Bogatyr	Denmark	World War I: The cargo ship was torpedoed and sunk in the North Sea (57°04′N 1°04′W) by SM UC-31 (Imperial German Navy). Her crew survived.
Cumberland	United Kingdom	The passenger ship foundered in the Bass Strait.
HMT Dewey	Royal Navy	The naval trawler was lost on this date.
Eleazar	United Kingdom	World War I: The fishing vessel was shelled and sunk in the Irish Sea 25 nautical miles (46 km) south west by west of St. Ann's Head, Pembrokeshire by SM UC-51 (Imperial German Navy). Her crew survived.
Falkland	Norway	World War I: The cargo ship was sunk in the Atlantic Ocean 10 nautical miles (19 km) south by east of Mine Head, Cornwall by SM U-55 (Imperial German Navy) with the loss of 10 crew.
Leytenant Burakov	Imperial Russian Navy	World War I: The dispatch vessel, a former Leytenant Burakov-class destroyer, struck a mine laid by SM UC-78 (Imperial German Navy) and sank in the Baltic Sea off the Åland Islands.
Lynorta	United Kingdom	World War I: The cargo ship was torpedoed and sunk in the Atlantic Ocean 102 nautical miles (189 km) north west by north of Tory Island, County Donegal (56°25′N 10°30′W) by SM U-94 (Imperial German Navy) with the loss of two of here crew.
Marie Alfred	France	World War I: The brigantine was sunk in the Atlantic Ocean north of Ouessant, Finistère by SM UB-40 (Imperial German Navy).
Pauline Louisa	France	World War I: The schooner was shelled and sunk in the English Channel north east of Ouessant (48°41′N 4°39′W) by SM UB-40 (Imperial German Navy). Her crew survived.
Roanoake	United Kingdom	World War I: The cargo ship was scuttled in the Atlantic Ocean 100 nautical miles (190 km) west of the Butt of Lewis, Outer Hebrides (58°39′N 9°08′W) by SM UB-48 (Imperial German Navy). Her crew survived.
SM U-44	Imperial German Navy	World War I: The Type U 43 submarine was rammed and sunk in the North Sea south of Norway (58°50′N 4°20′E) by HMS Oracle (Royal Navy) with the loss of all 44 crew.
Ursus Minor	Norway	World War I: The barque was sunk in the Atlantic Ocean 200 nautical miles (370 km) west of Ireland (55°29′N 15°33′W) by SM U-84 (Imperial German Navy). Her crew survived.

== 13 August ==
List of shipwrecks: 13 August 1917
Ship	State	Description
Akassa	United Kingdom	World War I: The passenger ship was torpedoed and sunk in the Atlantic Ocean 8 nautical miles (15 km) south east of Galley Head, County Cork (51°23′N 8°47′W) by SM UC-33 (Imperial German Navy) with the loss of seven lives.
Arcangelo Michele	Italy	World War I: The sailing vessel was sunk in the Tyrrhenian Sea south of Naples by SM UC-53 (Imperial German Navy).
HMS Bergamot	Royal Navy	World War I: The Anchusa-class sloop, operating as a Q-ship, was torpedoed and sunk in the Atlantic Ocean 70 nautical miles (130 km) off Killybegs, County Donegal (55°13′N 10°17′W) by SM U-84 (Imperial German Navy) with the loss of 14 of her 93 crew. Five miles off the entrance to Lough Swilly 47 survivors were rescued by HMT Lord Lister (Royal Navy) on 16 August.
Emilie Galline	France	World War I: The barque was sunk in the English Channel 25 nautical miles (46 km) south south west of Start Point, Devon, United Kingdom (49°58′N 4°03′W) by SM UC-79 (Imperial German Navy) with the loss of a crew member.
Il Nuovo Leonardo	Italy	World War I: The sailing vessel was sunk in the Tyrrhenian Sea south of Naples by SM UC-53 (Imperial German Navy).
Maston	United Kingdom	World War I: The collier was torpedoed and sunk in the Mediterranean Sea 35 nautical miles (65 km) east north east of Cape Spartivento, Calabria, Italy (38°25′N 16°43′E) by SM U-28 (Austro-Hungarian Navy) with the loss of two of her crew.
Turakina	United Kingdom	World War I: The passenger ship was torpedoed and sunk in the Atlantic Ocean 120 nautical miles (220 km) west south west of the Bishop Rock, Isles of Scilly (48°30′N 8°34′W) by SM U-86 (Imperial German Navy) with the loss of two of her crew.

== 14 August ==
List of shipwrecks: 14 August 1917
Ship	State	Description
Asti	Italy	World War I: The cargo ship was sunk in the Atlantic Ocean 220 nautical miles (410 km) west of the Isles of Scilly, United Kingdom (48°15′N 10°15′W) by SM U-93 (Imperial German Navy). Her crew survived.
Costanza	Italy	World War I: The cargo ship struck a mine and sank in the North Sea 3.5 nautical miles (6.5 km) south east by east of the Inner Dowsing Lightship (United Kingdom) by SM UC-63 (Imperial German Navy). Her crew survived.
Jane S.	United Kingdom	World War I: The fishing vessel struck a mine and sank in the North Sea 11 nautical miles (20 km) south east of St Abb's Head, Berwickshire.
Julita	Spain	World War I: The barque was sunk in the Mediterranean Sea 35 nautical miles (65 km) off Alexandria, Egypt by SM UC-22 (Imperial German Navy).
Eugenia	Italy	World War I: The cargo ship was sunk in the Mediterranean Sea 20 nautical miles (37 km) north of Cape Serrat, Tunisia (37°12′N 10°20′E) by SM UC-67 (Imperial German Navy).
Luna	Norway	World War I: The coaster was damaged in the North Sea 16 to 18 nautical miles (30 to 33 km) north of the Humber Lightship by SM UC-63 (Imperial German Navy). She was beached at Cleethorpes, Lincolnshire, United Kingdom but was later refloated.
Majorka	Norway	World War I: The full-rigged ship struck a mine and sank in the North Sea north of Scotland (58°34′N 5°14′W). Her crew survived.
N. Verbeckmoens	Netherlands	World War I: The cargo ship was torpedoed and sunk in the Atlantic Ocean off Trevose Head, Cornwall, United Kingdom (50°47′N 4°45′W) by SM UC-51 (Imperial German Navy) with the loss of four of her crew.
HMS Prize	Royal Navy	World War I: The Q-ship was torpedoed and sunk in the Atlantic Ocean north west of Ireland by SM UB-48 (Imperial German Navy) with the loss of all 27 crew.
Thames	United Kingdom	World War I: The coaster was shelled and sunk in the North Sea (53°42′N 0°24′E) by SM UC-63 (Imperial German Navy) with the loss of all ten crew.
Tuddal	Norway	World War I: The cargo ship was sunk in the Atlantic Ocean 150 nautical miles (280 km) south west of Ouessant, Finistère, France (46°45′N 7°00′W) by SM UB-40 (Imperial German Navy). Her crew survived.
Umberto I	Regia Marina	World War I: The armed merchant cruiser was torpedoed and sunk in the Ligurian Sea off Gallinara (44°04′N 8°15′E) by SM UC-35 (Imperial German Navy) with the loss of 26 of her crew.
Wisbech	United Kingdom	World War I: The cargo ship was torpedoed and sunk in the Atlantic Ocean 12 nautical miles (22 km) off Trevose Head by SM UC-51 (Imperial German Navy) with the loss of two of her crew.

== 15 August ==
List of shipwrecks: 15 August 1917
Ship	State	Description
Albertha	Denmark	World War I: The three-masted schooner was shelled and sunk in the Atlantic Ocean north west of the Hebrides, United Kingdom (57°00′N 9°54′W) by SM U-62 (Imperial German Navy). Her crew survived.
Alice	United Kingdom	World War I: The fishing vessel was scuttled in the North Sea off the mouth of the Humber (53°38′N 0°55′E) by SM UC-63 (Imperial German Navy) with the loss of all five crew.
Bandai Maru	Japan	World War I: The cargo ship was shelled in the Mediterranean Sea north east of Cape Bon, Tunisia (37°20′N 11°32′E) by SM U-33 (Imperial German Navy). She was consequently scuttled.
Brodstone	United Kingdom	World War I: The cargo ship was torpedoed and sunk in the Atlantic Ocean 95 nautical miles (176 km) west of Ouessant, Finistère, France (47°50′N 7°20′W) by SM UB-40 (Imperial German Navy) with the loss of five of her crew.
Ethel & Millie	Royal Navy	World War I: The fishing smack, operating as a naval auxiliary (Ethel & Millie), was sunk in the North Sea off the mouth of the Humber by SM UC-63 (Imperial German Navy) with the loss of all seven crew.
G & E (as Nelson)	Royal Navy	World War I: The fishing smack, operating as a naval auxiliary was shelled and sunk in the North Sea off the mouth of the Humber by SM UC-63 (Imperial German Navy) with the loss of a crew member. The captain of the Nelson, Thomas Crisp was posthumously awarded the Victoria Cross for his actions in this engagement.
Hylas	United Kingdom	World War I: The cargo ship was torpedoed and sunk in the Atlantic Ocean 10 nautical miles (19 km) east of the Butt of Lewis (58°39′N 5°49′W) by SM U-80 (Imperial German Navy). Her crew survived.
Phoebe	France	World War I: The cargo ship struck a mine and sank in the Bay of Biscay south by west of Penmarc'h, Finistère (47°48′N 4°25′W). Her crew were rescued by Tauron (French Navy).
Stroynyi	Imperial Russian Navy	The destroyer ran aground in the Gulf of Riga and was severely damaged. She was bombed by a German aircraft on 21 August and further damaged. She was abandoned as a total loss on 2 September.

== 16 August ==
List of shipwrecks: 16 August 1917
Ship	State	Description
SMS A13	Imperial German Navy	World War I: The A1-class torpedo boat was bombed and sunk at Ostend, West Flanders, Belgium by a British Handley Page O/100 aircraft.
Athenia	United Kingdom	World War I: The passenger ship was torpedoed and sunk in the Atlantic Ocean 7 nautical miles (13 km) north of Inishtrahull Island, County Donegal (55°33′N 7°23′W) by SM U-53 (Imperial German Navy) with the loss of 15 lives.
HMS Bradford City	Royal Navy	World War I: The Q-ship was sunk in the Strait of Messina (38°10′N 15°36′E) by SM U-28 (Austro-Hungarian Navy). Her crew survived.
Caroline Kock	Denmark	World War I: The three-masted schooner was shelled and sunk in the Atlantic Ocean west of the Hebrides, United Kingdom by SM U-80 (Imperial German Navy with the loss of a crew member.
Delphic	United Kingdom	World War I: The ocean liner was torpedoed and sunk in the Atlantic Ocean 135 nautical miles (250 km) south west by west of the Bishop Rock, Isles of Scilly (48°30′N 9°10′W) by SM UC-72 (Imperial German Navy) with the loss of five lives.
Eastgate	United Kingdom	World War I: The cargo ship was torpedoed and damaged in the Atlantic Ocean 120 nautical miles (220 km) south west by west of the Bishop Rock, Isles of Scilly by SM UB-40 (Imperial German Navy). She was beached by was later refloated.
Manchester Engineer	United Kingdom	World War I: The cargo ship was torpedoed and sunk in the North Sea 4.5 nautical miles (8.3 km) south east of Flamborough Head, Yorkshire by SM UC-16 (Imperial German Navy). Her crew survived.
Palatine	United Kingdom	World War I: The cargo ship was torpedoed and sunk in the Atlantic Ocean 10 nautical miles (19 km) west north west of Canna, Inner Hebrides by SM U-75 (Imperial German Navy). Her crew survived, but her captain was taken as a prisoner of war.
Svanholm	Denmark	World War I: The cargo ship was torpedoed and sunk in the North Sea by SM U-94 (Imperial German Navy). Her crew survived.

== 17 August ==
List of shipwrecks: 17 August 1917
Ship	State	Description
Edina	United Kingdom	World War I: The coaster was shelled and sunk in the Atlantic Ocean 30 nautical miles (56 km) south east of Stóra Dímun, Faroe Islands by SM U-55 (Imperial German Navy). Her crew survived.
Esperance	France	World War I: The trawler struck a mine and sank in the English Channel off Le Tréport, Seine-Inférieure with the loss of ten of her crew.
Lorenz Aiello	Italy	World War I: The sailing vessel was sunk in the Ligurian Sea off Sanremo, Liguria by SM UC-35 (Imperial German Navy).
Meuse II	France	World War I: The tanker was sunk in the Atlantic Ocean 140 nautical miles (260 km) south west of Ouessant, Finistère by SM UC-72 (Imperial German Navy).
Pontoporos	Greece	World War I: The cargo ship was sunk in the Bay of Biscay off the Glénan Islands, Finistère (47°33′N 3°15′W) by SM UC-21 (Imperial German Navy).
Susie	United Kingdom	World War I: The fishing ketch was shelled and sunk in the North Sea 10 nautical miles (19 km) north east by east of Scarborough, Yorkshire by SM UC-16 (Imperial German Navy) with the loss of a crew member.

== 18 August ==
List of shipwrecks: 18 August 1917
Ship	State	Description
Alfred J. Murray	United States	The tug was sunk in a collision with the 39th Street ferry in New York City, New york. The crew climbed aboard the ferry.
Ardens	United Kingdom	World War I: The cargo ship was torpedoed and sunk in the North Sea 2 nautical miles (3.7 km) east of Filey, Yorkshire by SM UC-16 (Imperial German Navy) with the loss of a crew member.
HMT Benjamin Stevenson	Royal Navy	World War I: The naval trawler was shelled and sunk in the North Sea 40 nautical miles (74 km) east of Fetlar, Shetland Islands by SM U-55 (Imperial German Navy). Her crew survived.
Dunkerquois	France	World War I: The cargo ship was torpedoed and sunk in the Atlantic Ocean 12 nautical miles (22 km) west by north of the Île de Batz, Finistère (48°50′N 4°19′W) by SM UC-48 (Imperial German Navy) with the loss of 16 of her 31 crew. Survivors were rescued by Phenix (France)
Kongsli	Norway	World War I: The cargo ship was sunk in the Atlantic Ocean 172 nautical miles (319 km) off Punta de Estaca de Bares, Galicia, Spain (46°10′N 10°12′W) by SM UB-48 (Imperial German Navy). Her crew survived.
Politania	United Kingdom	World War I: The cargo ship was torpedoed and sunk in the Mediterranean Sea 10 nautical miles (19 km) north west by west of Cape Sigli, Algeria (36°56′N 4°38′E) by SM UC-67 (Imperial German Navy). Her crew survived.

== 19 August ==
List of shipwrecks: 19 August 1917
Ship	State	Description
Aghios Georgios	Greece	World War I: The schooner was sunk in the Ionian Sea (36°23′N 21°44′E) by SM UC-74 (Imperial German Navy).
Brema	United Kingdom	World War I: The cargo ship was torpedoed and sunk in the North Sea 7.5 nautical miles (13.9 km) south of Flamborough Head, Yorkshire by SM UC-17 (Imperial German Navy). Her crew were rescued by Lonfanny (United Kingdom).
Eika II	Norway	World War I: The cargo ship was torpedoed and sunk in the North Sea 11 nautical miles (20 km) west of Sulen, Nordre Bergenhus, Norway by SM U-87 (Imperial German Navy) with the loss of a crew member.
Gartness	United Kingdom	World War I: The cargo ship was torpedoed and sunk in the Mediterranean Sea 180 nautical miles (330 km) east south east of Malta (34°52′N 18°14′E) by SM U-40 (Austro-Hungarian Navy) with the loss of 13 of her crew.
General Dutemple	France	World War I: The dredger struck a mine and sank in the English Channel off Cherbourg, Seine-Inférieure (49°43′N 1°34′W) with the loss of seven of her crew.
Glocliffe	United Kingdom	World War I: The collier was torpedoed and sunk in the English Channel 9 nautical miles (17 km) east north east of Berry Head, Devon (50°29′N 3°17′W) by SM UB-40 (Imperial German Navy) with the loss of two of her crew.
Monksgarth	United Kingdom	World War I: The cargo ship was torpedoed and sunk in the Atlantic Ocean 17 nautical miles (31 km) north by east of Ouessant, Finistère, France by SM UC-48 (Imperial German Navy). Her crew survived.
Rosario	United Kingdom	World War I: The cargo ship was torpedoed and sunk in the Atlantic Ocean south west of Ireland by SM UC-55 (Imperial German Navy) with the loss of 20 of her crew. Two survivors were taken as prisoners of war.
Spectator	United Kingdom	World War I: The cargo ship was torpedoed and sunk in the Atlantic Ocean 11 nautical miles (20 km) south East of Galley Head, County Cork (51°28′N 8°41′W) by SM UC-33 (Imperial German Navy). Her crew survived.
Thérèse et Marie	France	World War I: The cargo ship was sunk in the Bay of Biscay 13 nautical miles (24 km) north west of the Île du Pilier, Vendée (47°04′N 2°40′W) by SM UC-21 (Imperial German Navy) with the loss of two of her crew.
Ytterøy	Norway	World War I: The cargo ship was sunk in the Atlantic Ocean 10 nautical miles (19 km) east north east of the Île de Batz, Finistère (48°44′N 4°29′W) by SM UC-48 (Imperial German Navy) with the loss of a crew member.

== 20 August ==
List of shipwrecks: 20 August 1917
Ship	State	Description
Bulysses	United Kingdom	World War I: The tanker was torpedoed and sunk in the Atlantic Ocean 142 nautical miles (263 km) west north west of the Butt of Lewis by SM U-52 (Imperial German Navy). Her crew survived.
Claverley	United Kingdom	World War I: The cargo ship was sunk in the Atlantic Ocean 4 nautical miles (7.4 km) south east of the Eddystone Lighthouse by SM UB-38 (Imperial German Navy) with the loss of ten of her crew.
HMS E47	Royal Navy	World War I: The E-class submarine was lost in the North Sea with the loss of all 30 crew.
Edernian	United Kingdom	World War I: The cargo ship was torpedoed and sunk in the North Sea 6 nautical miles (11 km) east of Southwold, Suffolk by SM UB-10 (Imperial German Navy) with the loss of 14 of her crew.
Elswick Lodge	United Kingdom	World War I: The cargo ship was torpedoed and sunk in the Atlantic Ocean 260 nautical miles (480 km) west by south of Ouessant, Finistère, France by SM U-93 (Imperial German Navy) with the loss of four of her crew.
Ilya Muromets	Imperial Russian Navy	World War I: The auxiliary minesweeper struck a mine and sank in Worms Sound with the loss of eleven of her crew. by SM UC-58 (Imperial German Navy). Her crew survived.
Incemore	United Kingdom	World War I: The cargo ship was torpedoed and sunk in the Mediterranean Sea 52 nautical miles (96 km) south east by south of Pantelleria, Italy (36°27′N 13°02′E) by SM U-38 (Imperial German Navy) with the loss of a crew member.
HMT Kirkland	Royal Navy	World War I: The naval trawler struck a mine and sank in the Atlantic Ocean off Papa Stour, Shetland Islands (60°21′N 1°47′W) with the loss of eleven crew.
Serra do Marco	Portugal	World War I: The fishing vessel was sunk in the Atlantic Ocean off the coast of Portugal by SM UB-48 (Imperial German Navy).
Serra do Pilar	Portugal	World War I: The fishing vessel was sunk in the Atlantic Ocean off the coast of Portugal by SM UB-48 (Imperial German Navy).
Skagerrack	Imperial German Navy	World War I: The Kattegat-class Vorpostenboot was sunk by mines south of Horns Reef.
HMS Vala	Royal Navy	World War I: The Q-ship was sunk in the Atlantic Ocean 120 nautical miles (220 km) south west of the Isles of Scilly (48°37′N 9°28′W) by SM UB-54 (Imperial German Navy) with the loss of 43 of her crew.

== 21 August ==
List of shipwrecks: 21 August 1917
Ship	State	Description
Devonian	United Kingdom	World War I: The passenger ship was torpedoed and sunk in the Atlantic Ocean 20 nautical miles (37 km) north east of Tory Island, County Donegal by SM U-53 (Imperial German Navy) with the loss of two lives.
Goodwood	United Kingdom	World War I: The cargo ship was torpedoed and sunk in the Mediterranean Sea 28 nautical miles (52 km) north west by west of Cape Bon, Tunisia by SM UC-67 (Imperial German Navy). Her crew survived.
HS 4	United Kingdom	World War I: The tug was scuttled in the Atlantic Ocean 130 nautical miles (240 km) west south west of Ouessant, Finistère, France by SM UC-72 (Imperial German Navy). Her crew survived.
Mountpark	United Kingdom	The collier collided with Alexandra (United Kingdom) and sank in the Bristol Channel 6 nautical miles (11 km) north west of the Bull Point Lighthouse, Devon.
USS Nemes	United States Navy	The 50-foot (15 m) patrol vessel exploded, caught fire and sank in Cotteral Bay, Florida.
Norhilda	United Kingdom	World War I: The collier was torpedoed and sunk in the North Sea 5 nautical miles (9.3 km) south east of Scarborough, Yorkshire (54°15′N 0°10′W) by SM UC-17 (Imperial German Navy) with the loss of a crew member.
Oslo	United Kingdom	World War I: The cargo liner was torpedoed and sunk in the North Sea 15 nautical miles (28 km) east by north of the Out Skerries, Shetland Islands by SM U-87 (Imperial German Navy) with the loss of three of her crew.
RB 6	United Kingdom	World War I: The refrigerated barge was scuttled in the Atlantic Ocean 130 nautical miles (240 km) west south west of Ouessant by SM UC-72 (Imperial German Navy). Her crew survived.
Roscommon	United Kingdom	World War I: The cargo ship was torpedoed and sunk in the Atlantic Ocean 20 nautical miles (37 km) north east of Tory Island by SM U-53 (Imperial German Navy). Her crew survived.
Stroyny	Imperial Russian Navy	World War I: The Storozhevoi-class destroyer ran aground in the Gulf of Riga whilst minelaying. She was then bombed by Imperial German Navy Friedrichshafen FF.41 aircraft, and salvage was abandoned. Subsequent storms turned her into a wreck.
SM UC-41	Imperial German Navy	The Type UC II submarine sank in the Tay estuary after an internal explosion. All 27 crew and 7 British prisoners of war were killed.
Volodia	United Kingdom	World War I: The cargo ship was torpedoed and sunk in the Atlantic Ocean 285 nautical miles (528 km)) west of Ouessant, Finistère, France by SM U-93 (Imperial German Navy) with the loss of ten of her crew.

== 22 August ==
List of shipwrecks: 22 August 1917
Ship	State	Description
Alexander Shukoff	Denmark	World War I: The cargo ship was sunk in the Norwegian Sea 30 nautical miles (56 km) west of Florø, Nordre Bergenhus, Norway by SM U-87 (Imperial German Navy). Her crew survived.
Golo II	French Navy	World War I: The armed boarding steamer was sunk in the Ionian Sea off Corfu, Greece by SM UC-22 (Imperial German Navy) with the loss of 42 lives.
Gro	Norway	World War I: The cargo ship was sunk in the English Channel 6 nautical miles (11 km) south of Start Point, Devon, United Kingdom by SM UC-47 (Imperial German Navy). Her crew survived.
HMT Sophron	Royal Navy	World War I: The naval trawler struck a mine and sank in the Firth of Tay with the loss of eight of her crew.
Verdi	United Kingdom	World War I: The cargo ship was torpedoed and sunk in the Atlantic Ocean 115 nautical miles (213 km) north west by north of Eagle Island, County Mayo (55°15′N 13°20′W) by SM U-53 (Imperial German Navy) with the loss of six crew.

== 23 August ==
List of shipwrecks: 23 August 1917
Ship	State	Description
Boniface	United Kingdom	World War I: The cargo liner was torpedoed and sunk in the Atlantic Ocean 7 nautical miles (13 km) north east by north of Arranmore, County Donegal (55°08′N 8°27′W) by SM U-53 (Imperial German Navy) with the loss of a crew member.
Carl F. Cressy	United States	World War I: The four-masted schooner was shelled and sunk in the Atlantic Ocean 180 nautical miles (330 km) north west of Cape Finisterre, Spain by SM U-93 (Imperial German Navy). Her crew survived.
Constance	France	World War I: The cargo ship was sunk in the Mediterranean Sea 142 nautical miles (263 km) north east of Malta (36°15′N 17°25′E) by SM U-14 (Austro-Hungarian Navy).
Fratelli Danielli	France	World War I: The sailing vessel was sunk in the Mediterranean Sea south of Sicily, Italy by SM UC-67 (Imperial German Navy).
Peer Gynt	Norway	World War I: The cargo ship was sunk in the Atlantic Ocean 4 nautical miles (7.4 km) north of Pendeen Point, Cornwall, United Kingdom (50°23′N 5°20′W) by SM UC-47 (Imperial German Navy) with the loss of four of her crew.
Veghtstroom	United Kingdom	World War I: The cargo ship was torpedoed and sunk in the Atlantic Ocean 7 nautical miles (13 km) north west of the Godrevy Lighthouse, Cornwall (50°16′N 5°35′W) by SM UC-47 (Imperial German Navy) with the loss of five of her crew.
Winlaton	United Kingdom	World War I: The collier was torpedoed and sunk in the Atlantic Ocean 25 nautical miles (46 km) west of Cape Spartel, Morocco (35°40′N 6°25′W) by SM UB-48 (Imperial German Navy) with the loss of two of her crew. Her captain was taken as a prisoner of war.

== 24 August ==
List of shipwrecks: 24 August 1917
Ship	State	Description
Henriette	France	World War I: The cargo ship was torpedoed and sunk in the Atlantic Ocean 230 nautical miles (430 km) north west of Penmarc'h, Finistère (48°00′N 14°45′W) by SM U-62 (Imperial German Navy).
Kilwinning	United Kingdom	World War I: The collier was sunk in the Mediterranean Sea 94 nautical miles (174 km) east south east of Malta (35°26′N 16°30′E) by SM U-14 (Austro-Hungarian Navy). Her crew survived.
Parana	France	World War I: The troopship was torpedoed and damaged in the Aegean Sea between Andros and Euboea, Greece by SM UC-74 (Imperial German Navy). She consequently sank in Karystos Bay with the loss of seven lives.
Penelope	United Kingdom	World War I: The cargo ship was torpedoed and sunk in the Baltic Sea off the Swalfre Ort Lighthouse by a Kaiserliche Marine submarine.
Springhill	United Kingdom	World War I: The cargo ship was torpedoed and sunk in the North Sea 4 nautical miles (7.4 km) east north east of Scarborough, Yorkshire (54°21′N 0°22′W) by SM UB-21 (Imperial German Navy) with the loss of five of her crew.

== 25 August ==
List of shipwrecks: 25 August 1917
Ship	State	Description
Cymrian	United Kingdom	World War I: The cargo ship was torpedoed and sunk in the Atlantic Ocean 13 nautical miles (24 km) south east by south of the Tuskar Rock, Ireland by SM UC-75 (Imperial German Navy) with the loss of ten of her crew.
Frigga	Norway	World War I: The cargo ship was torpedoed and sunk in the English Channel 20 nautical miles (37 km) east south east of Portland Bill, Dorset, United Kingdom by SM UB-54 (Imperial German Navy). Her crew survived.
Garm	Norway	World War I: The coaster was sunk in the English Channel 8 nautical miles (15 km) east north east of Start Point, Devon, United Kingdom (50°19′N 3°29′W) by SM UC-65 (Imperial German Navy). Her crew survived.
Heatherside	United Kingdom	World War I: The collier was sunk in the Atlantic Ocean north west of Cape Ortegal, Spain (46°14′N 10°57′W) by SM U-93 (Imperial German Navy) with the loss of 27 of her crew.
Junona	Russia	World War I: The cargo ship was sunk in The Minch (58°32′N 5°34′W) by SM U-80 (Imperial German Navy).
Malda	United Kingdom	World War I: The passenger ship was torpedoed and sunk in the Atlantic Ocean 130 nautical miles (240 km) west of the Bishop Rock, Isles of Scilly by SM U-70 (Imperial German Navy) with the loss of 64 lives.
Nascent	United Kingdom	World War I: The cargo ship was torpedoed and sunk in the Atlantic Ocean 27 nautical miles (50 km) south of the Bishop Rock (49°32′N 6°25′W) by SM UC-49 (Imperial German Navy) with the loss of six of her crew.
Nerma	Denmark	World War I: The cargo ship was torpedoed and sunk in the English Channel 3.5 nautical miles (6.5 km) west of Berry Head, Devon by SM UC-65 (Imperial German Navy) with the loss of seven of her crew.
Ovar	Portugal	World War I: The cargo ship was sunk in the Atlantic Ocean (46°05′N 11°15′W) by SM U-93 (Imperial German Navy). Her crew survived.
Sycamore	United Kingdom	World War I: The cargo ship was sunk in the Atlantic Ocean 125 nautical miles (232 km) north west of Tory Island, County Donegal by SM UB-61 (Imperial German Navy) with the loss of eleven of her crew.

== 26 August ==
List of shipwrecks: 26 August 1917
Ship	State	Description
Assyria	United Kingdom	World War I: The cargo ship was torpedoed and sunk in the Atlantic Ocean 34 nautical miles (63 km) north west by north of Tory Island, County Donegal (55°40′N 9°00′W) by SM UB-61 (Imperial German Navy). Her crew survived.
Cassiar	Canada	The passenger ship ran aground on Trivet Isle, British Columbia and sank. All on board were rescued.
Chacma	Norway	World War I: The sailing vessel was sunk in the English Channel 50 nautical miles (93 km) west of the Casquets, Channel Islands by SM UC-62 (Imperial German Navy). Her crew survived.
Durango	United Kingdom	World War I: The cargo ship was shelled and sunk in the Atlantic Ocean 50 nautical miles (93 km) north west of Barra Head, Outer Hebrides (57°08′N 8°55′W) by SM U-53 (Imperial German Navy). Her crew survived.
Eirini	Greece	World War I: The cargo ship struck a mine and sank in the Atlantic Ocean 2.75 nautical miles (5.09 km) west of Hartland Point, Devon, United Kingdom.
Feltre	Italy	World War I: The cargo ship was sunk in the North Sea 4 nautical miles (7.4 km) south south east of Flamborough Head, Yorkshire, United Kingdom by SM UB-32 (Imperial German Navy).
Kenmore	United Kingdom	World War I: The cargo ship was torpedoed and sunk in the Atlantic Ocean 30 nautical miles (56 km) north of Inishtrahull Island, County Donegal (55°57′N 7°30′W) by SM U-53 (Imperial German Navy) with the loss of five crew.
Lighter No. 9	United States	The Lighter sank at L Wharf, South Boston, Massachusetts.
Maria del Carmine	Italy	World War I: The sailing vessel was sunk in the Mediterranean Sea east of Sicily by SM UC-35 (Imperial German Navy).
Marmion	United Kingdom	World War I: The cargo ship was torpedoed and sunk in the Atlantic Ocean 300 nautical miles (560 km) west by south of Ouessant, Finistère, France (46°18′N 11°40′W) by SM U-93 (Imperial German Navy) with the loss of 17 of her crew.
Matunga	Australia	World War I: The cargo-liner was captured on 6 August and was scuttled by SMS Wolf (Imperial German Navy) on 26 August off Waigeu Island, Netherlands New Guinea.
Maurizio P.	Italy	World War I: the coaster was sunk in the Mediterranean Sea (36°56′N 0°15′E) by SM UC-20 (Imperial German Navy). Her crew survived.
Minas Queen	Canada	World War I: The three-masted schooner was shelled and sunk in the Atlantic Ocean 350 nautical miles (650 km) north west of Cape Finisterre, Spain (46°23′N 10°24′W) by SM U-93 (Imperial German Navy) with the loss of six of her crew.
Titian	United Kingdom	World War I: The cargo ship was torpedoed and sunk in the Mediterranean Sea 170 nautical miles (310 km) south east of Malta (34°20′N 17°30′E) by SM U-14 (Austro-Hungarian Navy). Her crew survived.
W. H. Dwyer	Canada	World War I: The cargo ship was torpedoed and sunk in the English Channel 15 nautical miles (28 km) east by north of Berry Head, Devon, United Kingdom (50°18′N 3°11′W) by SM UB-38 (Imperial German Navy). Her crew survived.

== 27 August ==
List of shipwrecks: 27 August 1917
Ship	State	Description
Anna	Denmark	World War I: The cargo ship was torpedoed and sunk in the North Sea 25 nautical miles (46 km) east of Lerwick, Shetland Islands, United Kingdom by SM U-87 (Imperial German Navy) with the loss of a crew member.
Aurora	Denmark	World War I: The cargo ship was torpedoed and sunk in the North Sea 25 nautical miles (46 km) east south east of Lerwick (60°35′N 0°07′E) by SM U-87 (Imperial German Navy) with the loss of a crew member.
Hathor	United Kingdom	World War I: The cargo ship was torpedoed and sunk in the Mediterranean Sea 50 nautical miles (93 km) off Cape Ténès, Algeria by SM UB-48 (Imperial German Navy) with the loss of a crew member. Her captain was taken as a prisoner of war.

== 28 August ==
List of shipwrecks: 28 August 1917
Ship	State	Description
Hidalgo	United Kingdom	World War I: The cargo ship was torpedoed and sunk in the Barents Sea 120 nautical miles (220 km) north east of the North Cape, Norway by SM U-28 (Imperial German Navy) with the loss of 15 crew.
Marselieza	Russia	World War I: The cargo ship was sunk in the Barents Sea 110 nautical miles (200 km) north west by north of the North Cape (72°30′N 29°00′E) by SM U-28 (Imperial German Navy).
Nairn	United Kingdom	World War I: The collier was torpedoed and sunk in the Mediterranean Sea 125 nautical miles (232 km) north by west of Benghazi, Libya (34°05′N 19°20′E) by SM U-14 (Austro-Hungarian Navy). Her crew survived.
Pasqualino Carmela	Italy	World War I: The sailing vessel was sunk in the Strait of Messina by SM UC-38 (Imperial German Navy).
Scilla	Italy	World War I: The ferry struck a mine and sank in the Strait of Messina.
Whitecourt	United Kingdom	World War I: The cargo ship was shelled and sunk in the Barents Sea 120 nautical miles (220 km) north north east of the North Cape (72°48′N 29°00′E) by SM U-28 (Imperial German Navy). Her crew survived.

== 29 August ==
List of shipwrecks: 29 August 1917
Ship	State	Description
Cooroy	United Kingdom	World War I: The four-masted barque was torpedoed and sunk in the Irish Sea 16 nautical miles (30 km) south south east of Ballycotton, County Cork by SM UC-75 (Imperial German Navy). Her crew survived.
Laura C. Anderson	United States	World War I: The four-masted schooner was captured and scuttled in the English Channel 15 nautical miles (28 km) east of Barfleur, Manche, France (49°43′N 0°55′W) by SM UC-65 (Imperial German Navy). Her crew survived.
Lynburn	United Kingdom	World War I: The coaster struck a mine and sank in the Irish Sea 0.5 nautical miles (0.93 km; 0.58 mi) south east of the Arklow Lightship (United Kingdom) with the loss of eight of her crew.
Milazzo	Italy	World War I: The bulk carrier was sunk in the Mediterranean Sea 250 nautical miles (460 km) east of Malta (34°44′N 19°16′E) by SM U-14 (Austro-Hungarian Navy).
Treloske	United Kingdom	World War I: The cargo ship was torpedoed and sunk in the Atlantic Ocean 145 nautical miles (269 km) north north west of Cape Finisterre, Spain by SM U-93 (Imperial German Navy) with the loss of a crew member.
Vronwen	United Kingdom	World War I: The cargo ship was torpedoed and sunk in the Mediterranean Sea 20 nautical miles (37 km) north west by north of Gozo, Malta (36°12′N 13°56′E) by SM UC-38 (Imperial German Navy) with the loss of a crew member.

== 30 August ==
List of shipwrecks: 30 August 1917
Ship	State	Description
Athinai	Greece	World War I: The coaster was shelled and sunk in the Kassos Strait south east of Cape Sidero, Crete by SM UC-74 (Imperial German Navy).
Eastern Prince	United Kingdom	World War I: The cargo ship was torpedoed and sunk in the Atlantic Ocean 30 nautical miles (56 km) south west of the Eddystone Lighthouse (49°41′N 4°12′W) by SM U-62 (Imperial German Navy) with the loss of five crew.
Grelhame	United Kingdom	World War I: The cargo ship was torpedoed and sunk in the English Channel 4 nautical miles (7.4 km) south west of Start Point by SM U-62 (Imperial German Navy). Her crew survived.
Hunter	United States	During a voyage from Chignik to Kodiak, Territory of Alaska, the 63-ton motor vessel sank without loss of life four minutes after striking a rock near Foggy Cape (56°32′N 156°58′W) on Sutwik Island off the south coast of the Alaska Peninsula.
Liselotte	Imperial German Navy	The Anneliese-class Vorpostenboot foundered in a storm in the North Sea.
Natal	France	The passenger ship collided with another French merchant vessel and sank in the Mediterranean Sea off Marseille, Bouches-du-Rhône. All 520 people on board were rescued.
Noya	United Kingdom	World War I: The cargo ship was torpedoed and sunk in the Atlantic Ocean 8 nautical miles (15 km) west south west of The Lizard, Cornwall (49°52′N 5°22′W) by SM U-62 (Imperial German Navy) with the loss of a crew member.
HMT Ocean's Gift II	Royal Navy	The naval trawler was lost on this date.

== 31 August ==
List of shipwrecks: 31 August 1917
Ship	State	Description
Eleni	Greece	World War I: The coaster was sunk in the Kassos Strait by SM UC-74 (Imperial German Navy). Her crew survived.
Erissos	Greece	World War I: The cargo ship was torpedoed and damaged in the English Channel 7 to 8 nautical miles (13 to 15 km) south east of Berry Head, Devon, United Kingdom by SM UC-65 (Imperial German Navy). She was beached but was later refloated.
Marques de Mudela	Spain	World War I: The cargo ship struck a mine and sank in the Bay of Biscay 14 nautical miles (26 km) off the La Coubre Lighthouse, Finistère, France (45°24′N 1°17′W). Her crew survived.
Miniota	United Kingdom	World War I: The cargo ship was torpedoed and sunk in the English Channel (49°50′N 3°00′W) by SM U-19 (Imperial German Navy) with the loss of three of her crew.
Vernon	United Kingdom	World War I: The coaster was torpedoed and sunk in the North Sea 22 nautical miles (41 km) south east by south of Spurn Head, Yorkshire by SM UB-30 (Imperial German Navy) with the loss of a crew member.
Westbury	United Kingdom	World War I: The collier was torpedoed and sunk in the Atlantic Ocean 8 nautical miles (15 km) south south east of the Fastnet Rock (51°18′N 9°22′W) by SM U-48 (Imperial German Navy). Her crew survived.

== Unknown date ==
List of shipwrecks: Unknown date 1917
Ship	State	Description
Navajo	United States	The tanker caught fire mid-Atlantic Ocean and was abandoned on 1 or 11 August.
SM UC-72	Imperial German Navy	World War I: The Type UC II submarine was lost after 21 August with the loss of all 31 crew.
W-4	Italian Royal Navy	World War I: The W-class submarine was lost in the Adriatic Sea, probably sunk by an Austro-Hungarian mine off Cape Rodoni sometime between 4 and 6 August.
Unnamed	Flag unknown	Unidentified ship stranded at Tregardock. The steamship was driven ashore at Tregardock, Cornwall, United Kingdom on or before 27 August.
