= SS Esemplare =

SS Esemplare is the name of the following ships:

- SS Esemplare (1889), sunk 10 December 1916 by SM U-38
- SS Esemplare (1902), sunk 7 August 1917 by SM UC-37
