= SM U-75 =

Submarine serving in the Imperial German Navy in World War I

History

German Empire
- Name: U-75
- Ordered: 9 March 1915
- Builder: AG Vulkan, Hamburg
- Yard number: 57
- Launched: 30 January 1916
- Commissioned: 26 March 1916
- Fate: 13 December 1917 - Struck a mine off Terschelling. 23 dead, unknown number of survivors.

General characteristics
- Class & type: Type UE I submarine
- Displacement: 755 t (743 long tons) surfaced; 832 t (819 long tons) submerged
- Length: 56.80 m (186 ft 4 in) (o/a); 46.66 m (153 ft 1 in) (pressure hull)
- Beam: 5.90 m (19 ft 4 in) (o/a); 5.00 m (16 ft 5 in) (pressure hull)
- Height: 8.25 m (27 ft 1 in)
- Draught: 4.86 m (15 ft 11 in)
- Installed power: 2 × 900 PS (662 kW; 888 shp) surfaced; 2 × 800 PS (588 kW; 789 shp) submerged
- Propulsion: 2 shafts, 2× 1.38 m (4 ft 6 in) propellers
- Speed: 9.9 knots (18.3 km/h; 11.4 mph) surfaced; 7.9 knots (14.6 km/h; 9.1 mph) submerged
- Range: 7,880 nmi (14,590 km; 9,070 mi) at 7 knots (13 km/h; 8.1 mph) surfaced; 83 nmi (154 km; 96 mi) at 4 knots (7.4 km/h; 4.6 mph) submerged
- Test depth: 50 m (160 ft)
- Complement: 4 officers, 28 enlisted
- Armament: 2 × 50 cm (19.7 in) torpedo tubes (one port bow, one starbord stern); 4 torpedoes; 1 × 8.8 cm (3.5 in) SK L/30 deck gun

Service record
- Part of: I Flotilla; 29 June 1916 – 13 December 1917
- Commanders: Kptlt. Curt Beitzen; 26 March 1916 – 1 May 1917; Kptlt. Fritz Schmolling; 2 May – 13 December 1917
- Operations: 7 patrols
- Victories: 8 merchant ships sunk (16,913 GRT); 1 warship sunk (10,850 tons); 3 auxiliary warships sunk (1,434 GRT); 2 merchant ships damaged (7,548 GRT); 1 auxiliary warship damaged (194 GRT); 1 merchant ship taken as prize (1,700 GRT)

Submarine serving in the Imperial German Navy in World War I

SM U-75 was one of the 329 submarines serving in the Imperial German Navy in World War I. U-75 was engaged in naval warfare and took part in the First Battle of the Atlantic. On her first mission, U-75 laid the mine that sank the cruiser HMS Hampshire during her voyage to Russia carrying British Secretary of State for War Lord Kitchener. The cruiser sank at 59°07′N 03°24′W west of the Orkney Islands with nearly total loss of life in a force 9 gale.

== Design ==
Type UE I submarines were preceded by the longer Type U 66 submarines. U-75 had a displacement of 755 tonnes (743 long tons) when at the surface and 832 tonnes (819 long tons) while submerged. She had a total length of 56.80 m (186 ft 4 in), a pressure hull length of 46.66 m (153 ft 1 in), a beam of 5.90 m (19 ft 4 in), a height of 8.25 m (27 ft 1 in), and a draught of 4.86 m (15 ft 11 in). The submarine was powered by two 900 metric horsepower (660 kW; 890 shp) engines for use while surfaced, and two 800 metric horsepower (590 kW; 790 shp) engines for use while submerged. She had two propeller shafts. She was capable of operating at depths of up to 50 metres (160 ft).

The submarine had a maximum surface speed of 9.9 knots (18.3 km/h; 11.4 mph) and a maximum submerged speed of 7.9 knots (14.6 km/h; 9.1 mph). When submerged, she could operate for 83 nautical miles (154 km; 96 mi) at 4 knots (7.4 km/h; 4.6 mph); when surfaced, she could travel 7,880 nautical miles (14,590 km; 9,070 mi) at 7 knots (13 km/h; 8.1 mph). U-75 was fitted with two 50 centimetres (20 in) torpedo tubes (one at the port bow and one starboard stern), four torpedoes, and one 8.8 cm (3.5 in) SK L/30 deck gun. She had a complement of thirty-two (twenty-eight crew members and four officers).

== Summary of raiding history ==
Date	Name	Nationality	Tonnage (Note: Merchant ship tonnages are in gross register tons. Military vessels are listed by tons displacement.)	Fate
5 June 1916	HMS Hampshire	Royal Navy	10,850	Sunk
22 June 1916	HMD Laurel Crown	Royal Navy	81	Sunk
7 August 1916	HMT John High	Royal Navy	228	Sunk
12 August 1916	Kovda	Imperial Russian Navy	1,125	Sunk
20 September 1916	Etton	United Kingdom	2,831	Sunk
16 November 1916	Fenja	Denmark	433	Sunk
22 November 1916	Reserv	Sweden	1,700	Captured as prize
23 November 1916	Arthur	Sweden	1,435	Sunk
9 April 1917	Ganslei	Russia	1,273	Sunk
15 April 1917	HMT Arctic Prince	Royal Navy	194	Damaged
10 August 1917	Solglimt	Norway	1,037	Sunk
16 August 1917	Palatine	United Kingdom	2,110	Sunk
3 September 1917	Treverbyn	United Kingdom	4,163	Sunk
22 November 1917	King Idwal	United Kingdom	3,631	Sunk
10 December 1917	Aureole	United Kingdom	3,998	Damaged
2 September 1918	Ariadne Christine	United Kingdom	3,550	Damaged

== Fate ==
On December 13, 1917, U-75 was escorted by two minesweepers through the minefields surrounding Heligoland to the “Yellow” exit route. After the minesweepers had joined the freighter Nordstern, the submarine continued on its own. Shortly thereafter, U 75 struck a mine north of Terschelling. Some of the crew went on deck and fired signal flares, which were seen from the Nordstern. By the time the ship had turned around and reached the place where the submarine had sunk (♁53° 59′ N, 5° 24′ E), eight crew members were rescued. Among the survivors was the commander, Lieutenant Commander Schmolling. There is evidence that the mine had been deliberately laid by the British submarine E51 in the supposedly safe escape route. The German submarine UB 61 had already been sunk by such a mine on November 29, 1917. U 75's propeller is currently on display at the Laboe Naval Memorial.

== Bibliography ==
- Gröner, Erich; Jung, Dieter; Maass, Martin (1991). U-boats and Mine Warfare Vessels. German Warships 1815–1945. Vol. 2. Translated by Thomas, Keith; Magowan, Rachel. London: Conway Maritime Press. ISBN 0-85177-593-4.
