= Edgar von Spiegel von und zu Peckelsheim =

German WWI submarine commander (1885–1965)

Baron Edgar von Spiegel von und zu Peckelsheim
- Born: October 9, 1885; Padrojen, Municipality Insterburg in East Prussia
- Died: May 15, 1965 (aged 79); Bremen
- Military career
- Allegiance: German Empire
- Branch: Imperial German Navy
- Service years: 1903 - 1917
- Rank: Kapitänleutnant
- Commands: U-32; 3 September 1914 - 17 March 1916; U-93; 10 February 1917 - 30 April 1917
- Conflicts: U-boat Campaign (World War I)
- Awards: Iron Cross 1st class
- Other work: Consul in World War II, Writer

Edgar von Spiegel von und zu Peckelsheim (October 9, 1885 – May 15, 1965) was a German submarine commander in World War I, Consul in New Orleans and Marseille in World War II and writer. He wrote several, mainly autobiographical naval warfare books. The most successful one was "Kriegstagebuch U 202" (U boat 202. The war diary of a German submarine, 1916). It sold 360,000 copies in Germany and was also a success in the United States.

== Biography ==
=== Submarine commander, Consul ===
Baron Edgar von Spiegel originated from the German noble family "Spiegel von und zu Peckelsheim". He grew up in East Prussia and completed military training at a marine cadet school. In 1903 he joined the German imperial navy as a midshipman. In 1911 he served as Oberleutnant zur See on the small cruiser SMS Cormoran. The cruiser helped to suppress the Sokehs Rebellion in Ponape, German New Guninea. Von Spiegel was the leader of the local police during the suppression.

=== World War I ===
In World War I von Spiegel was promoted to Captain lieutenant. From September 1914 to February 1916 he served as commander of the submarine U-32. From February to April 1917 he commanded the submarine U-93. In a battle with the British Q-ship HMS Prize, commanded by Lieutenant William Edward Sanders, SM U-93 was badly damaged. Edgar von Spiegel and two men of his crew went overboard. They were rescued by the Q-ship and spent the rest of the war as prisoners in United Kingdom.

=== Post World War I ===
After World War I von Spiegel returned to Germany. In the Weimar Republic he started working in the shipping industry and then made a changeover to the automobile industry. In the late 1920s he worked as general manager of the Graham-Paige Automobile GmbH in Berlin, a subsidiary of the American automobile manufacturer Graham-Paige.

=== World War II ===
In Nazi Germany, von Spiegel served in the German diplomatic service. In the years 1936/37 he worked in the Department Ribbentrop at the German embassy in London. Since 1937 he was Consul (Generalkonsul) in New Orleans. Because of spy activities the Federal Bureau of Investigation investigated him. Baron von Spiegel operated in the consulate building "Van Benthuysen Elms Mansion". He is believed to have briefed German submarines in the Gulf of Mexico via radio about merchant vessels leaving the port of New Orleans for England. In December 1941 Germany declared war on the United States, and he had to leave New Orleans. After returning to Germany he served as consul in Marseille in yet unoccupied France. In 1942, he was appointed SS Oberführer. Von Spiegel was an observer of the destruction of the old city of Marseille by the SS and Gestapo. After World War II he claimed that this destruction was necessary because of risk of disease and because of the "security of the (German) troops." In August 1944 Marseille was liberated by the Allies. von Spiegel left Marseille and joined the staff of Reichsführer SS in November 1944. He died 1965 in Bremen.

=== Writer ===
Baron Edgar von Spiegel wrote several, mostly autobiographical, books about his experiences in the Imperial German Navy. In his first book Kriegsbilder aus Ponape. Erlebnisse eines Seeoffiziers im Aufstande auf den Karolinen (War pictures from Ponape. Experiences of a naval officer in the rebellion on the Caroline Islands, 1912) he described his involvement in the suppression of the Sokehs Rebellion in Ponape. His bestselling book was Kriegstagebuch U 202 (published 1916), translated by Barry Domvile as U boat 202. The war diary of a German submarine, published 1919, where he described his experiences as commander of the submarine SM U-32 (The title "U 202" was fictional; a German submarine with this name did not exist). The book sold 360,000 copies in Germany and was one of the most widely spread works of German World War I literature. The war diary sold also very well in the United States. It was used as a template for Gerhard Menzel's screenplay of the movie Morgenrot (1933) about the fate of a German submarine in World War I. His book U-Boot im Fegefeuer (Submarine in Purgatory, 1930) described von Spiegel's prisoner of war after the sinking of his submarine U 93. von Spiegel also wrote two original screenplays. He translated Lowell Thomas' Raiders of the Deep (1928), a book about Submarines in World War I, and wrote a romance novel in a south sea surroundings (Das Maedchen unter den drei Baeumen - The girl under the three trees, 1930).

== Sources ==
- Joerg Friedrich Vollmer: Imaginaere Schlachtfelder. Kriegsliteratur in der Weimarer Republik – eine literatursoziologische Untersuchung. PhD Thesis, Freie Universitaet Berlin 2003 (Chapter 5: Die Orthodoxen: Krieg als Abenteuer, pp. 88 – 126) Online Edition (in German language).
- Biographisches Handbuch des deutschen Auswaertigen Dienstes 1871–1945. Band 4: S. Published by Auswaertiges Amt, Historischer Dienst, Editors: Bernd Isphording, Gerhard Keiper, Martin Kroeger. Schoeningh, Paderborn u. a. 2012, ISBN 978-3-506-71843-3 (in German language)
