= SM U-93 =

German submarine

History

German Empire
- Name: U-93
- Ordered: 15 September 1915
- Builder: Germaniawerft, Kiel
- Yard number: 257
- Laid down: 12 January 1916
- Launched: 15 December 1916
- Commissioned: 10 February 1917
- Fate: Lost to unknown cause off Hardelot, France in January 1918

General characteristics
- Class & type: Type U 93 submarine
- Displacement: 838 t (825 long tons) surfaced; 1,000 t (980 long tons) submerged
- Length: 71.55 m (234 ft 9 in) (o/a); 56.05 m (183 ft 11 in) (pressure hull)
- Beam: 6.30 m (20 ft 8 in) (o/a); 4.15 m (13 ft 7 in) (pressure hull)
- Height: 8.25 m (27 ft 1 in)
- Draught: 3.94 m (12 ft 11 in)
- Installed power: 2 × 2,400 PS (1,765 kW; 2,367 shp) surfaced; 2 × 1,200 PS (883 kW; 1,184 shp) submerged
- Propulsion: 2 shafts, 2 × 1.66 m (5 ft 5 in) propellers
- Speed: 16.8 knots (31.1 km/h; 19.3 mph) surfaced; 8.6 knots (15.9 km/h; 9.9 mph) submerged
- Range: 9,020 nmi (16,710 km; 10,380 mi) at 8 knots (15 km/h; 9.2 mph) surfaced; 52 nmi (96 km; 60 mi) at 5 knots (9.3 km/h; 5.8 mph) submerged
- Test depth: 50 m (160 ft)
- Complement: 4 officers, 32 enlisted
- Armament: 6 × 50 cm (19.7 in) torpedo tubes (four bow, two stern); 10-12 torpedoes; 1 × 8.8 cm (3.5 in) SK L/30 deck gun

Service record
- Part of: IV Flotilla; 5 April 1917 – 15 January 1918
- Commanders: Kptlt. Edgar von Spiegel von und zu Peckelsheim; 10 February – 30 April 1917; Oblt.z.S. Wilhelm Ziegner; 30 April – 22 May 1917; Oblt.z.S. Helmut Gerlach; 23 May 1917 – 15 January 1918
- Operations: 5 patrols
- Victories: 33 merchant ships sunk (87,637 GRT); 1 auxiliary warship sunk (235 GRT); 2 merchant ships damaged (12,429 GRT); 1 warship damaged (199 tons)

SM U-93 was one of the 329 submarines serving in the Imperial German Navy in World War I. U-93 was engaged in the naval warfare and took part in the First Battle of the Atlantic.

== Design ==
Type U 93 submarines were preceded by the shorter Type U 87 submarines. U-93 had a displacement of 838 tonnes (825 long tons) when at the surface and 1,000 tonnes (980 long tons) while submerged. She had a total length of 71.55 m (234 ft 9 in), a pressure hull length of 56.05 m (183 ft 11 in), a beam of 6.30 m (20 ft 8 in), a height of 8.25 m (27 ft 1 in), and a draught of 3.94 m (12 ft 11 in). The submarine was powered by two 2,400 metric horsepower (1,800 kW; 2,400 shp) engines for use while surfaced, and two 1,200 metric horsepower (880 kW; 1,200 shp) engines for use while submerged. She had two propeller shafts. She was capable of operating at depths of up to 50 metres (160 ft).

The submarine had a maximum surface speed of 16.8 knots (31.1 km/h; 19.3 mph) and a maximum submerged speed of 8.6 knots (15.9 km/h; 9.9 mph). When submerged, she could operate for 52 nautical miles (96 km; 60 mi) at 5 knots (9.3 km/h; 5.8 mph); when surfaced, she could travel 9,020 nautical miles (16,710 km; 10,380 mi) at 8 knots (15 km/h; 9.2 mph). U-93 was fitted with six 50 centimetres (20 in) torpedo tubes (four at the bow and two at the stern), twelve to sixteen torpedoes, and one 8.8 cm (3.5 in) SK L/30 deck gun. She had a complement of thirty-six (thirty-two crew members and four officers).

== Operational history ==
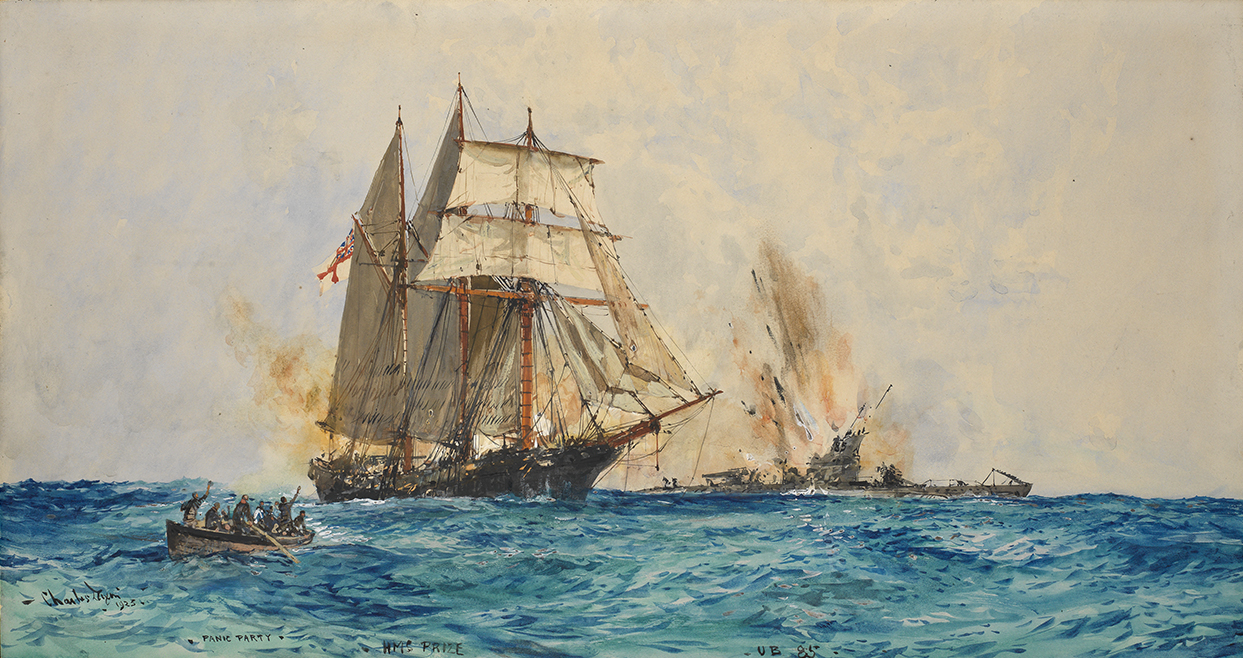
HMS Prize Q-ship attacking U-93

After February 1917 she was commanded by the late author of books (e.g. U boat 202. The war diary of a German submarine, 1919) and experienced submarine commander Edgar von Spiegel von und zu Peckelsheim

On 30 April 1917 about 180 nautical miles (330 km; 210 mi) south of Ireland, in the Atlantic, U-93 attacked HMS Prize, a three-masted topsail schooner (one of the Q ships) commanded by Lieutenant William Edward Sanders (who received a Victoria Cross for the action). HMS Prize was damaged by shellfire. After the 'panic party' had taken to the boats and the ship appeared to be sinking, the U-boat approached to within 80 yards (73 m) of her port quarter, whereupon the White Ensign was hoisted and the Prize opened fire.

Within a few minutes the submarine was on fire and her bows rose in the air, whilst the Prize was further damaged. The U-boat disappeared from sight, and was believed to have been sunk by the crew of the Prize and by several of the German crew (including her captain) who had been blown or jumped into the sea.

Neither of the crippled ships had sunk, with the Prize being towed in flames back to Kinsale, while the U-93 struggled back to the Sylt nine days later after a dramatic escape effort through the British mine and destroyer barrages off Dover.

U 93 after repairs operated in the English channel. She was lost to unknown cause off Hardelot, France in January 1918. The wreck was located by divers in 2003.

== Summary of raiding history ==
Date	Name	Nationality	Tonnage (Note: Merchant ship tonnages are in gross register tons. Military vessels are listed by tons displacement.)	Fate
15 April 1917	Fram	Denmark	105	Sunk
18 April 1917	Troldfos	Norway	1,459	Sunk
18 April 1917	West Lothian	Norway	1,887	Sunk
22 April 1917	Vestelv	Norway	1,729	Sunk
28 April 1917	Diana	Denmark	207	Damaged
29 April 1917	Comedian	United Kingdom	4,889	Sunk
29 April 1917	Ikbal	United Kingdom	5,434	Sunk
30 April 1917	Ascaro	Italy	3,245	Sunk
30 April 1917	Horsa	United Kingdom	2,949	Sunk
30 April 1917	Parthenon	Greece	2,934	Sunk
30 April 1917	HMS Prize	Royal Navy	199	Damaged
19 June 1917	Louise	Norway	645	Sunk
27 June 1917	Baron Ogilvy	United Kingdom	4,570	Sunk
4 July 1917	Kodan	Denmark	308	Sunk
12 August 1917	Bestum	Norway	3,520	Sunk
14 August 1917	Asti	Italy	5,300	Sunk
20 August 1917	Elswick Lodge	United Kingdom	3,558	Sunk
21 August 1917	Volodia	United Kingdom	5,689	Sunk
23 August 1917	Carl F. Cressy	United States	898	Sunk
25 August 1917	Heatherside	United Kingdom	2,767	Sunk
25 August 1917	Ovar	Portugal	1,650	Sunk
26 August 1917	Marmion	United Kingdom	4,066	Sunk
26 August 1917	Minas Queen	Canada	492	Sunk
29 August 1917	Treloske	United Kingdom	3,071	Sunk
18 October 1917	Macao	Brazil	3,557	Sunk
27 October 1917	D. N. Luckenbach	United States	2,929	Sunk
28 October 1917	USAT Finland	United States Army	12,222	Damaged
29 October 1917	La Epoca	Uruguay	2,432	Sunk
30 October 1917	Liff	Norway	2,521	Sunk
2 January 1918	Veda	United Kingdom	25	Sunk
4 January 1918	Goeland I	French Navy	235	Sunk
6 January 1918	Kanaris	Greece	3,793	Sunk
6 January 1918	Harry Luckenbach	United States	2,798	Sunk
6 January 1918	Henri Lecour	France	2,488	Sunk
6 January 1918	Dagny	Denmark	1,220	Sunk
14 January 1918	Babin Chevaye	France	2,174	Sunk
15 January 1918	War Song	United Kingdom	2,535	Sunk

== Bibliography ==
- Gröner, Erich; Jung, Dieter; Maass, Martin (1991). U-boats and Mine Warfare Vessels. German Warships 1815–1945. Vol. 2. Translated by Thomas, Keith; Magowan, Rachel. London: Conway Maritime Press. ISBN 0-85177-593-4.
