= Sanders Memorial Cup =

New Zealand sailing competition

The Sanders Memorial Cup is a trophy for senior interprovincial challenge sailing competitions in New Zealand. It was first sailed for in 1921, when it was won by the yacht Heather, which represented the Otago province. The Sanders Memorial Cup is the oldest sailing trophy still competed for in New Zealand.

== History ==
In early 1921, the Otago Yacht and Motorboat Association challenged its Auckland counterpart to a challenge over a series of races to be conducted in 14 feet (4.3 m) X-class yachts. Walker & Hall, a jewelry firm, donated a 50-guinea cup as a trophy, which was to be named the Sanders Memorial Cup. This was in memory of Lieutenant Commander William Sanders, from Takapuna, who served in the First World War with the Royal Naval Reserve and was a posthumous recipient of the Victoria Cross. The cup stands on an oak plinth and includes three silver panels; these recited tributes to Sanders from King George V, Lord John Jellicoe, the Governor-General of New Zealand, and the Lords of the Admiralty.

The inaugural challenge for the Sanders Memorial Cup was won by Heather, sailed by George Wiseman representing Otago, against Iron Duke, representing Auckland and sailed by Jellicoe, in a series of five races on Waitematā Harbour over the Easter period of 1921. For several years, the winners received miniatures of the cup from Walker & Hall although this practice ceased during the Great Depression. However, Wiseman, the skipper of the first yacht to win the cup, did not receive one for the 1921 victory, the miniature instead going to W. McCulloch, the original captain of the Heather who sailed her in the first two races of the series.

Notable winners of the Sanders Memorial Cup include Albert Willetts (three times) and Hugh Poole (five times). Since 1971, the cup has been sailed for by Javelin-class yachts. It is the oldest sailing trophy still competed for in New Zealand.

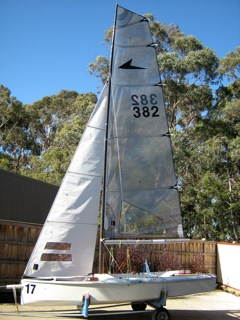
A Javelin-class yacht
