= Hugh Poole =

New Zealand sailor

Personal information
- Full name: Hugh David Poole
- Born: 6 September 1924 Lower Hutt, Wellington, New Zealand
- Died: 3 June 2012 (aged 87) Lower Hutt, Wellington, New Zealand

Sport
- Sport: Sailing
- Event: Soling

Hugh David Poole (6 September 1924 – 3 June 2012) was a New Zealand sailor. He competed in the Soling at the 1976 Summer Olympics, and was a five-time winner of the Sanders Memorial Cup.
