= William Edward Sanders =

New Zealand Victoria Cross recipient (1883–1917)

William Edward Sanders VC DSO
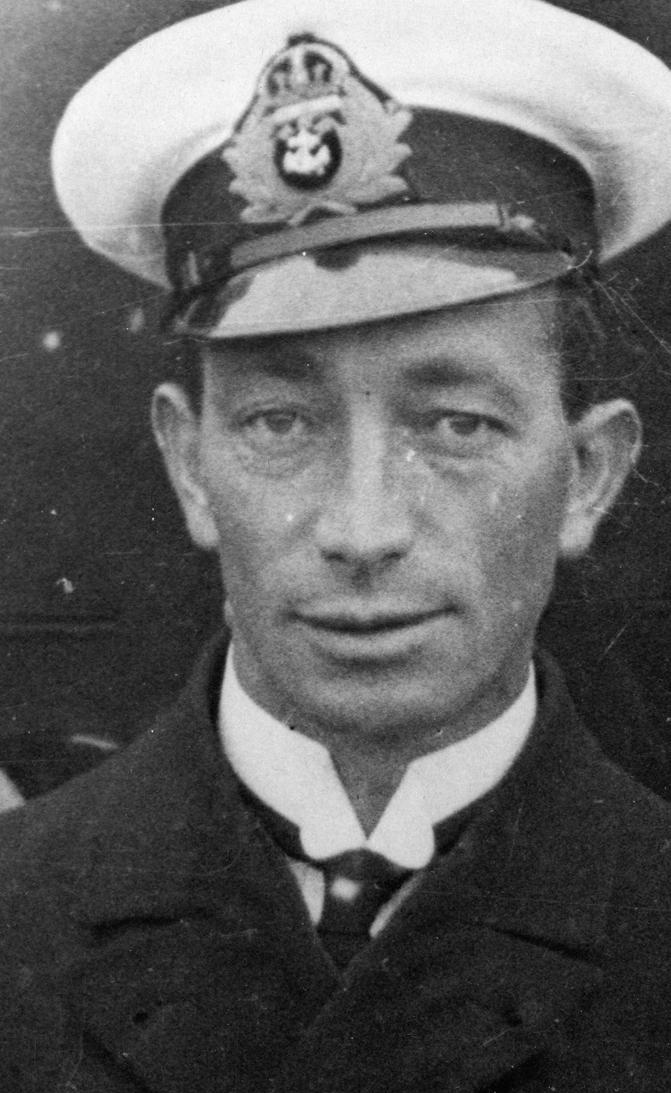
- Sanders, c. 1916–17
- Born: 7 February 1883; Auckland, New Zealand
- Died: 14 August 1917 (aged 34) at sea, in the Atlantic Ocean
- Military career
- Allegiance: British Empire
- Branch: Merchant Navy; Royal Naval Reserve
- Service years: 1915–1917
- Rank: Lieutenant commander
- Nickname: "Gunner Billy"
- Commands: HMS Prize
- Conflicts: First World War; Atlantic U-boat campaign †
- Awards: Victoria Cross; Distinguished Service Order

William Edward Sanders VC DSO (7 February 1883 – 14 August 1917) was a First World War New Zealand recipient of the Victoria Cross (VC), the highest award for gallantry "in the face of the enemy" that could be awarded to British and Commonwealth forces at the time.

Born in Auckland, Sanders took up a seafaring career in 1899. He initially worked aboard steamships before transferring to sailing ships to enhance his career prospects. Sanders earned a master's certificate in late 1914, following the outbreak of the First World War. He then served aboard troopships in the Merchant Navy until April 1916, when he was commissioned in the Royal Naval Reserve. He completed his military training in the United Kingdom, after which he served aboard Helgoland, a Q-ship that operated against German submarines. His performance on his first two patrols earned him his own command, HMS Prize, in February 1917.

Sanders was awarded the VC for his actions while on his first patrol as captain, when Prize engaged and drove off a German U-boat that had earlier attacked and damaged his ship. He was killed in action during Prize's fourth patrol when a U-boat sank his ship. His VC, the first and only such medal to be awarded to a New Zealander serving with a naval force, was presented to his father and is held by the Auckland War Memorial Museum. There are several tributes to Sanders, including the Sanders Memorial Cup, a sailing trophy for 14-foot (4.3 m) yachts.

== Early life ==
William Edward Sanders was born in the Auckland suburb of Kingsland on 7 February 1883. His father, Edward Helman Cook Sanders, was a bootmaker, who with his wife Emma Jane Sanders (née Wilson), had three more children. William's maternal grandfather was a sea captain and worked for the family's shipping company.

Sanders attended Nelson Street School until 1894, when his family moved to Takapuna. He shifted to Takapuna School, which was close to Lake Pupuke, where he learned to sail. He earned the nickname "Gunner Billy" for his exploits with a small cannon that a classmate brought to school. He left school at the age of 15 and, at the urging of his parents, was apprenticed to a mercer in Auckland's Queen Street. He was not particularly interested in the trade and, desiring a career at sea, would go down to the wharves to inspect the berthed ships and chat with their captains and crewmen.

In 1899, Sanders became aware of a vacancy for a cabin boy aboard Kapanui, a steamer that worked the coast north of Auckland. An officer on the ship was an acquaintance and had given Sanders the tip that a position was available. Sanders promptly applied to join the vessel and was the successful applicant. He remained with the company that operated Kapanui for three years. In 1902 he joined Aparima, operated by the Union Steam Ship Company, which traded between New Zealand and India. In 1906, as an ordinary seaman, he transferred to NZGSS Hinemoa, a government steamer servicing lighthouses along the New Zealand coast and depots on offshore islands.

With his seafaring career to date spent working on steamships, Sanders decided to gain experience under sail with the Craig Line. At the time, steam was looked down upon by seafarers, sailors being regarded as more skillful. From 1910, Sanders sailed on a series of vessels and by 1914, after taking his mate's certificates, he was mate of the barque Joseph Craig. On 7 August 1914, the ship foundered on the Hokianga bar and Sanders took charge of a small boat to seek help. He appeared at the inquest held at Auckland into her sinking, the blame for which was placed on the master.

== First World War ==
During the early part of the First World War, Sanders worked as second mate on Moeraki. He also sat for his master's certificate, passing with honours on 7 November 1914. He was discharged from Moeraki in December and applied for the Royal Naval Reserve (RNR). However, he was not called up and in the interim served as a Merchant Navy officer on the troopships Willochra and Tofua. After Sanders' repeated pleas to authorities, eventually in June 1915 the New Zealand High Commissioner wrote to the Admiralty in support of his efforts to join the RNR. This advocacy was presumably successful for in December 1915 he found passage on a steamer bound to Glasgow via the Atlantic. He reached the United Kingdom on 17 April 1916 and made his way to London where, two days after his arrival, he was appointed an acting sub-lieutenant in the RNR.

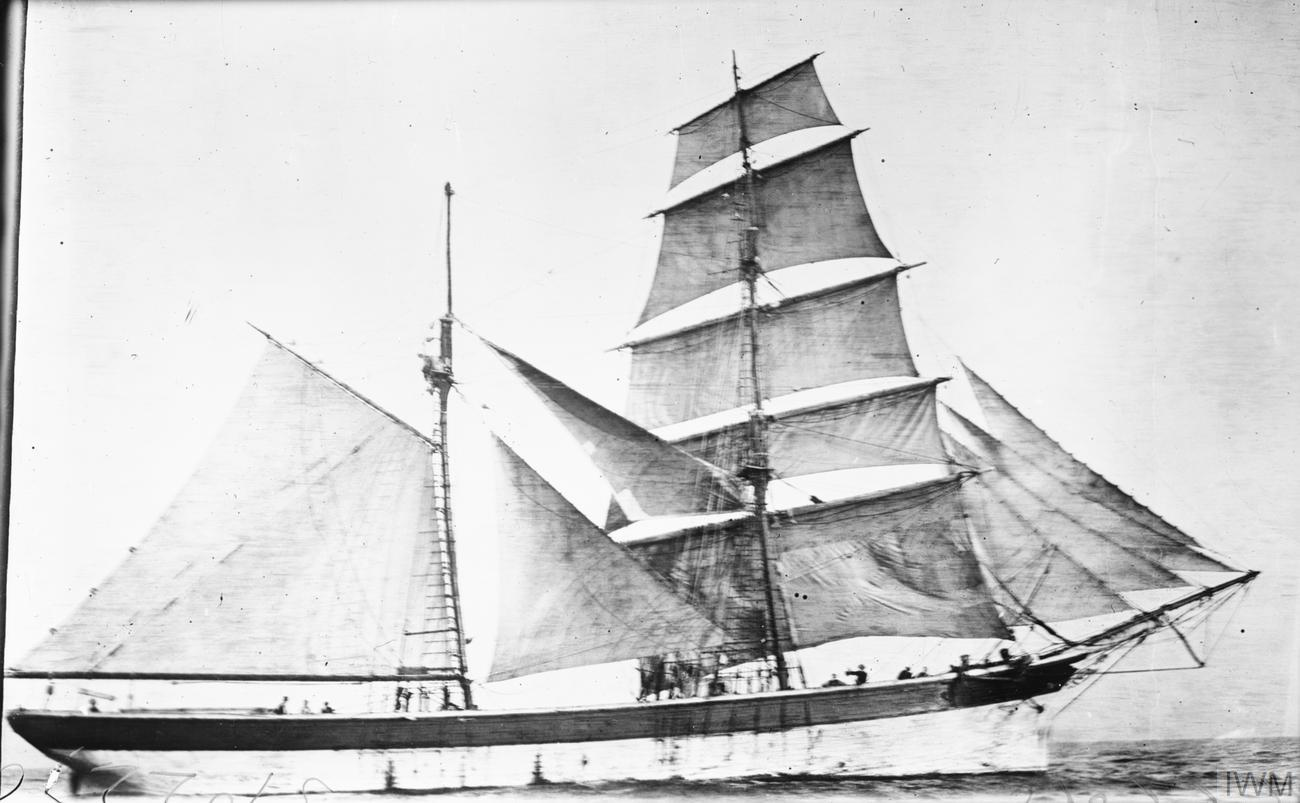
Brig 2, an example of a British Q-ship

After completing a three-month junior officer's course at the training facility HMS Excellent on Whale Island, Sanders was granted a position on Helgoland, a Q-ship operating against German submarines in the Western Approaches. Q-ships were merchant ships crewed by Navy personnel and bearing hidden weaponry. When attacked by U-boats, a portion of the ship's crew (referred to as a panic party) would appear to evacuate the vessel, sometimes setting smoke fires to simulate damage. This would encourage its attacker to approach and when the U-boat was close enough, the Q-ship's guns would be revealed and open fire on the approaching submarine.

Helgoland was a Dutch brigantine armed with 12-pounder guns and a machine gun. Sanders, second in command to fellow New Zealander Lieutenant A. D. Blair, helped oversee its conversion to a Q-ship. On its first patrol in September 1916, his ship participated in two actions against U-boats and, on its second the following month, it again encountered U-boats on two occasions. During the first engagement, Helgoland was becalmed due to lack of wind, without engines and extremely vulnerable. With limited manoeuvrability and with the attacking U-boat content to fire on the ship from a distance, Helgoland was forced to reveal its identity early in the action. The U-boat was able to get away but not without first firing two torpedoes which passed harmlessly under Helgoland. In the second engagement, Helgoland came to the assistance of a steamer being attacked by a U-boat. In doing so, Sanders had to expose himself to gunfire in order to remove a jammed screen obscuring the ship's gun.

=== HMS Prize ===
Sanders' conduct on Helgoland resulted in a promotion to lieutenant, and he was also recommended for command of his own ship. In early 1917, he was appointed captain of HMS Prize, (Note: The ship was originally commissioned as HMS First Prize; the Admiralty dropped First from her name on 1 May 1917.) a three-masted topsail schooner that was sailing under the German flag when it was the first enemy ship to be seized by the British after the outbreak of the First World War. Originally sold by the Admiralty to a shipping company, it was later offered to the Royal Navy for use as a decoy vessel and converted to a Q-ship in early 1917. This involved the addition of diesel engines, radio equipment and armament, including two 12-pounder guns; one was inside a collapsible deckhouse while the other was on a platform that was raised from the hold. A pair of Lewis guns and a Maxim machine gun were also fitted.

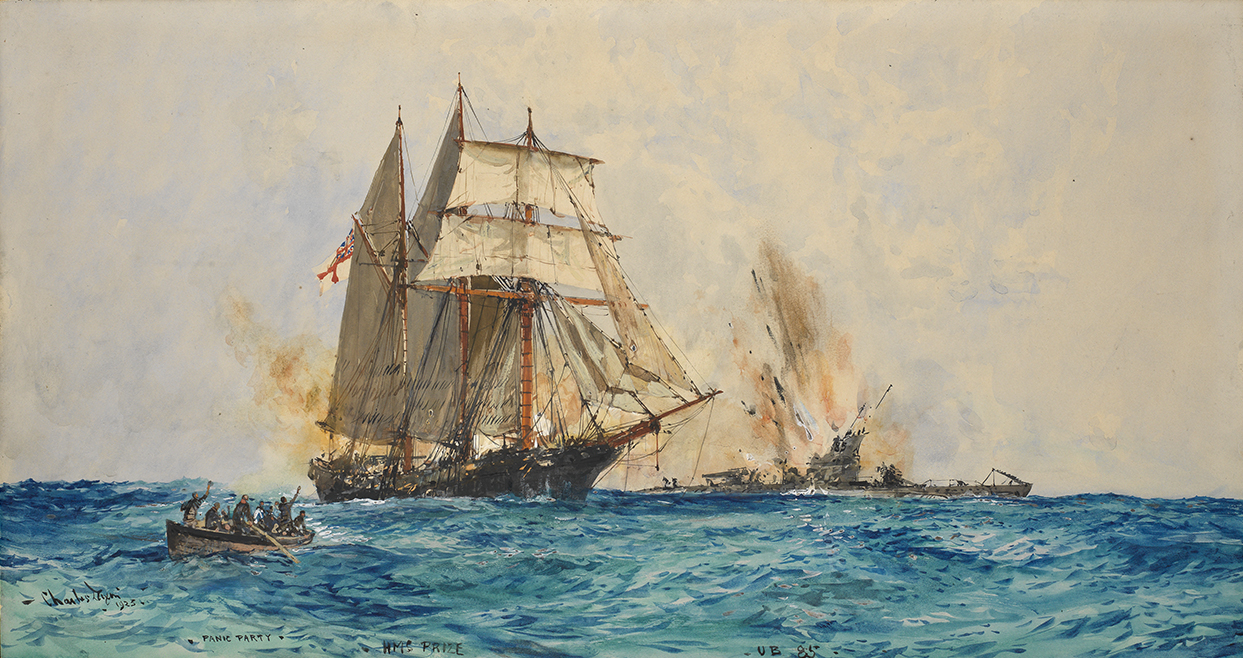
HMS Prize engaging U-93

The conversion work on Prize was carried out near Falmouth and Sanders arrived there in mid-April 1917 to supervise the final stages of the work and fitting out of the ship. Prize was formally commissioned into the Royal Navy a few days later, on 25 April, with a crew of 27, including Sanders. It departed for its first patrol the next day. In the evening of 30 April, near the Isles of Scilly in the Atlantic, Prize was attacked by a U-boat, U-93, commanded by Kapitänleutnant Edgar von Spiegel von und zu Peckelsheim. The Q-ship was badly damaged by shellfire from the U-boat's deck gun. Sanders, having dispatched the panic party to a small boat, remained under cover with the rest of his men. Despite several of them being wounded, the crew remained in place to maintain the façade of an abandoned ship.

After 20 minutes of shelling, Prize appeared to the Germans to be sinking. The U-boat approached her port quarter, whereupon Sanders ordered the White Ensign hoisted and Prize opened fire. Within a few minutes the submarine had received severe damage to her conning tower (pictured), with several crew members blown into the water. After moving away, the U-boat disappeared from sight in mist, and was believed by the crew of Prize to have been sunk. The panic party, still in its boat, collected three survivors, including the captain of the U-boat, and brought them back to Prize. The damage to the ship was serious, and the German prisoners assisted in repairs as it made for the Irish coast and received a tow as it approached Kinsale. In the meantime, U-93 managed to struggle back to the island of Sylt, near the German coast, nine days later.

While Prize was being repaired, the First Sea Lord, Admiral Sir John Jellicoe, offered Sanders command of a destroyer of his choosing, which he declined. Preferring to remain in his current role, Sanders returned to sea in late May with Prize conducting a second patrol for three weeks. Sanders was wounded slightly in the arm during an action on 12 June, in which Prize encountered another German submarine, UC-35, on the surface. It was fired at 30 times by the U-boat as it approached. Once Sanders gave the order to fire, the U-boat turned away. Only a few shots from Prize were fired and the U-boat quickly submerged and got away.

After being repaired, Prize undertook another patrol in late June and early July. On 22 June, while Sanders was at sea, his award of the Victoria Cross (VC) for his actions on 30 April was gazetted. The VC, instituted in 1856, was the highest award for valour that could be bestowed on members of the military of the British Empire. All of the crew present on 30 April received awards; Sanders' lieutenant received the Distinguished Service Order (DSO), two other officers the Distinguished Service Cross, and the rest of the crew was awarded the Distinguished Service Medal. Sanders was also promoted to lieutenant commander. Because the use of Q-ships such as Prize was still secret, the particulars of the action leading to the awards made to Sanders and his crew were not made publicly available. Instead, the published details of his VC when it was gazetted simply read:

In recognition of his conspicuous gallantry, consummate coolness, and skill in command of one of H.M. Ships in action.

=== Final patrol ===
Sanders, becoming increasingly fatigued from the stress of his duties, embarked on Prize for another patrol in early August 1917. Before he left, he made a request to be relieved of his command citing "overstrain". The Admiralty approved a few days later but Sanders had already departed on patrol. Sailing into the Atlantic under a Swedish flag, the ship was accompanied by a British submarine, HMS D6. It was intended that D6 would submerge and observe Prize throughout the day. When an enemy ship was sighted, the crew of Prize would place discreet signals in the rigging to indicate the ship's position to the watching D6. The submarine would then attempt to move into a position where it could torpedo the approaching enemy. On 13 August 1917, a lookout spotted UB-48. Sanders opted to use the guns of Prize to shell the German U-boat; UB-48 was not damaged and it submerged to evade the attack. Prize and D6 remained on station.

Oberleutnant Wolfgang Steinbauer, the captain of UB-48, was determined to sink Prize and stalked the ship. Soon it was dark and he surfaced his submarine and sighted a light in the distance. He believed that it was likely to be someone aboard Prize opening a porthole or lighting a pipe or cigarette. He launched two torpedoes, one of which struck Prize and exploded. Investigating what remained of Prize he found only wreckage and the body of a British sailor. The D6, still nearby, heard the explosion of the torpedo. At dawn on 14 August, D6 surfaced but no trace was found of Prize or her crew and it was presumed that she had been sunk.

== Medals and legacy ==
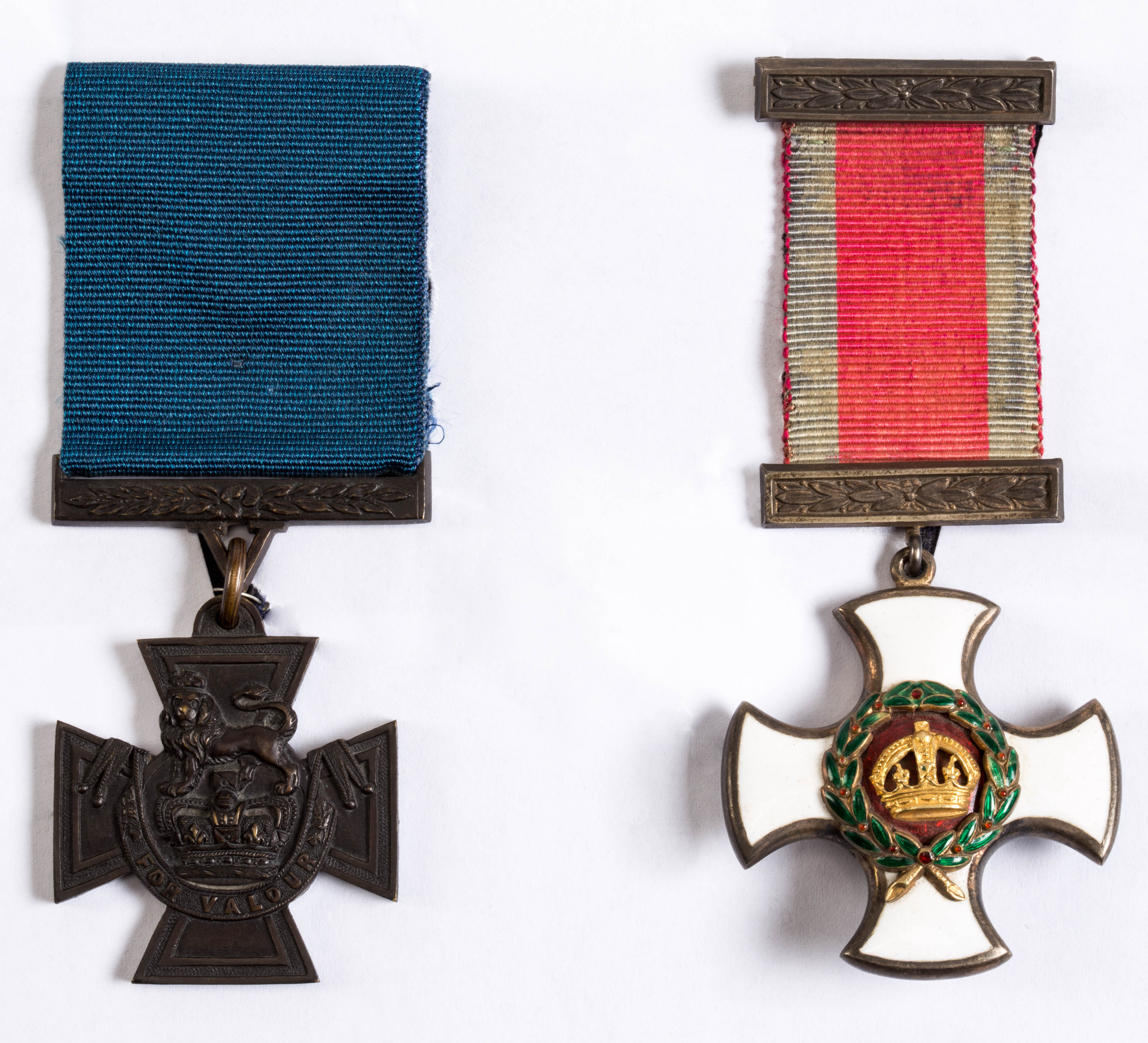
Victoria Cross (Note: Up until 1918, in contrast to those awarded to soldiers, VCs for naval personnel had a blue ribbon.) & DSO awarded to Sanders

Sanders, a bachelor, died without knowledge of the award of a DSO for his actions during the engagement with UC-35 on 12 June 1917. He was also entitled to the British War Medal, the Mercantile Marine War Medal and the Victory Medal. In June 1918, Sanders' father received his son's VC and DSO from the Earl of Liverpool, the Governor-General of New Zealand, in a ceremony at the Auckland Town Hall. Sander's VC, the first and only one awarded to a New Zealander serving with a naval force, and DSO are on display at the Auckland War Memorial Museum. The museum also holds a framed exhibit of photographs of Sanders and his citations that was originally presented to Takapuna Primary School, his old school, by Earl Jellicoe in September 1919.

Having no known grave, Sanders is commemorated by the Commonwealth War Graves Commission on its Plymouth Naval Memorial in England. He is remembered in a number of other ways, including by a bronze tablet in the church at Milford Haven, the home port of Prize, a plaque in the Auckland Town Hall, and The Sanders Memorial Scholarship at the University of Auckland for children of members of the Royal Navy or the Mercantile Marine. His name is on one of the gravestones in the family plot in Purewa Cemetery in Meadowbank. In 1921, the Sanders Memorial Cup, named in his honour, was established for competition between 14-foot (4.3 m) yachts. Sanders Avenue in Takapuna is named after him. Each year, cadets from the Training Ship Leander hold a memorial parade in commemoration of Sanders. William Sanders Retirement Village at Devonport is also named after him.
