= HMS Prize =

British ship

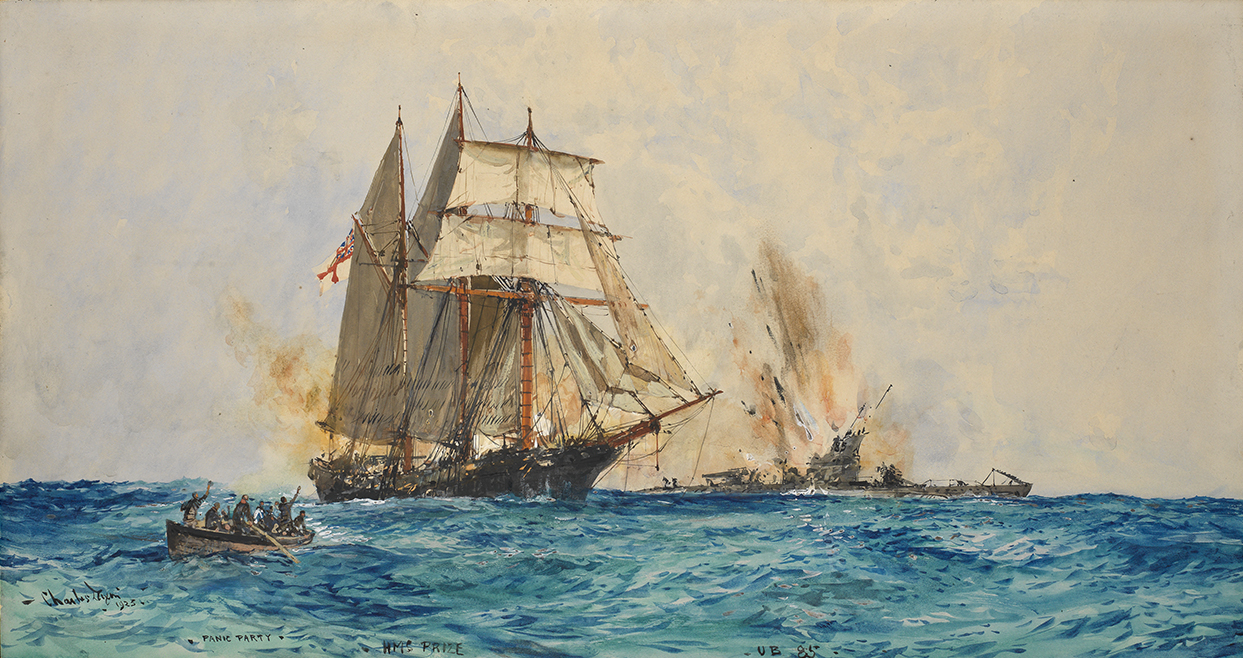
- A painting depicting Prize shelling U-93

History

Imperial Germany
- Name: Else
- Builder: E.V. Smit & Zoon
- Launched: 1901
- Fate: Captured by Royal Navy, 4 August 1914

United Kingdom
- Name: HMS Prize
- Namesake: Prize
- Commissioned: 25 April 1917
- Refit: February–March 1917 (conversion to Q ship)
- Fate: Sunk, 13 August 1917

General characteristics
- Type: Q ship
- Displacement: 277 long tons (281 t)
- Length: 122 ft 6 in (37.3 m)
- Beam: 24 ft 0 in (7.3 m)
- Draught: 10 ft 5 in (3.2 m)
- Propulsion: Sail; Twin 50 hp (37 kW) Kelvin diesel motors
- Complement: 27
- Armament: Two 12-pounder guns; Two Lewis guns; One Maxim gun

HMS Prize was a schooner converted to a Q ship during the First World War and commanded by Lieutenant William Sanders of the Royal Naval Reserve.

Originally a German vessel called Else, she was captured by the Royal Navy in the first days of the First World War. In April 1917 she was commissioned into the Royal Navy as a Q ship with the name HMS First Prize, later to be shortened to HMS Prize. During her first patrol, Prize was involved in an engagement with a U-boat, U-93 for which Sanders received the Victoria Cross while the rest of the crew were also awarded various medals. Prize was destroyed by a torpedo on 13 August 1917, with all crew lost.

== History ==
A steel-hulled three-masted schooner, Else was built in Groningen, the Netherlands, by the firm E. V. Smit & Zoon in 1901 for a German ship owner. Displacing 277 tons, she had an overall length of 122 feet 6 inches (37.3 m) with a beam of 24 feet (7.3 m). Her draught was 10 feet 5 inches (3.2 m). Her home port was Leer, near Emden. On 4 August 1914, the day on which the United Kingdom declared war on Imperial Germany and entered the First World War, she was transiting the English Channel carrying a cargo of hides. Intercepted by HMS Diana, a small cruiser of the Royal Navy, Else's crew was taken prisoner and the ship sailed into Falmouth with a prize crew.

Else was sold a month later; her new owner was the Marine and Navigation Company, owned by William Garthwaite. She was renamed First Prize, on account of being the first ship captured by the Royal Navy during the war. Garthwaite's intention was to use her on the coastal trading routes.

Later on in the war, the Admiralty was looking for vessels suitable for fitting out as Q ships. These were merchant ships crewed by Royal Navy personnel and bearing hidden weaponry. When attacked by U-boats, a portion of the ship's crew (referred to as a panic party) would appear to evacuate the vessel, sometimes setting smoke fires to simulate damage. This would encourage its attacker to approach and when the U-boat was close enough, the Q ship's guns would become operational and open fire, hopefully destroying the submarine.

In November 1916, First Prize, berthed at Swansea, was identified as being a vessel suitable for Q ship service. She was accordingly requisitioned by the Royal Navy. Within weeks, Garthwaite had gifted the ship to the Royal Navy for service in the war. He also offered to fit her out for war service in return for an honorary commission in the Royal Navy, but this was declined.

== Service as a Q ship ==
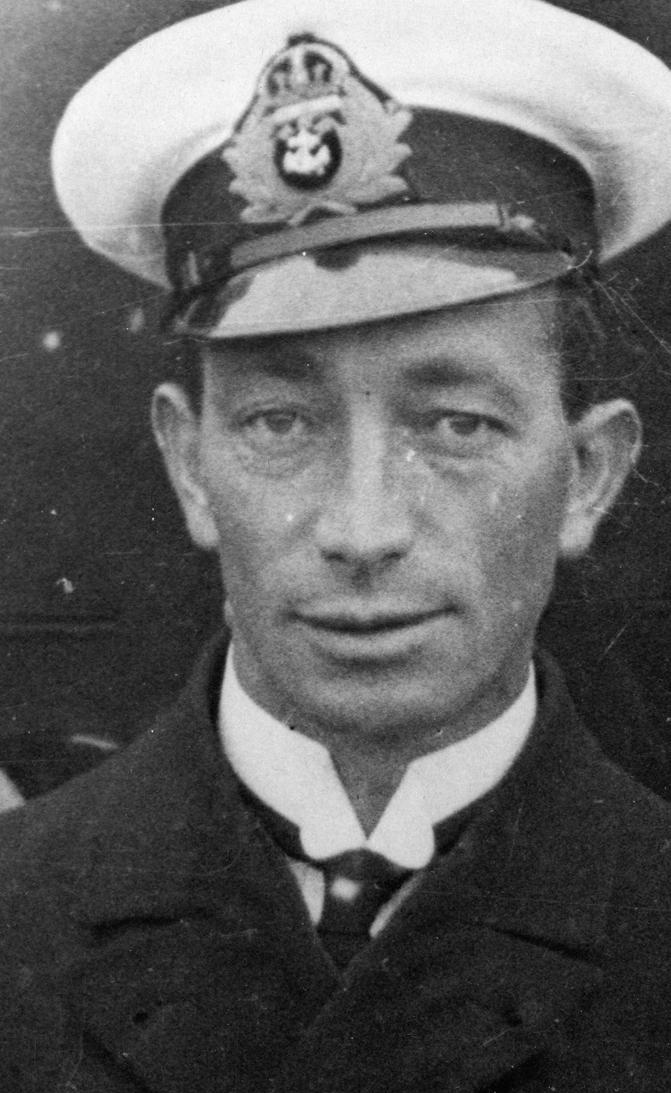
The commander of Prize, William Sanders

First Prize underwent a refit at Ponsharden, near Falmouth. This included the fitting of two 12-pounder guns, at the bow and stern respectively. The gun at the bow was screened within a collapsible deckhouse while that at the stern was mounted such that it could be raised from the hold. Two Lewis guns and a machinegun were also fitted. The vessel's mode of propulsion was added to, with twin 50-horsepower (37 kW) diesel motors, manufactured by Kelvin Diesels, being fitted and for communications, a radio transmitter and receiver, not typical for sailing vessels of the time, was installed.

First Prize was formally commissioned into the Royal Navy on 25 April 1917, with a crew of 27, including its commander, Lieutenant William Sanders, a New Zealander serving in the Royal Naval Reserve. She departed for her first patrol the next day. In the evening of 30 April, near the Scillies in the Atlantic, First Prize was attacked by a U-boat, U-93 commanded by Edgar von Spiegel von und zu Peckelsheim. The Q ship was badly damaged by shellfire from the U-boat's deck guns. Sanders, having dispatched a panic party in a small boat thus giving the impression of a ship being abandoned, remained under cover with his men. Despite several of them being wounded, the crew remained hidden.

After 20 minutes of shelling, First Prize appeared to be sinking. The U-boat approached her port quarter, whereupon Sanders ordered the White Ensign hoisted and First Prize opened fire. Within a few minutes the submarine had received severe damage to her conning tower, with several crew members blown into the water. After moving away, the U-boat disappeared from sight in mist, and was believed by the crew of First Prize to have been sunk. The panic party, still in its boat, collected three survivors, including her captain, and brought them back to First Prize. The damage to the ship was serious, and the German prisoners assisted in repairs as it made for the Irish coast and received a tow as it approached Kinsale. Despite its damage, U-93 managed to struggle back to Sylt nine days later.

In the meantime, the damaged First Prize returned to her port of Milford Haven. The Admiralty had renamed her, and she was to now be known as HMS Prize. After Prize was repaired, she returned to sea in late May, conducting a second patrol off the northwest coast of Ireland for three weeks. On 12 June, she encountered UC-35 on the surface. The U-boat shelled Prize 30 times as it approached but once a wounded Sanders gave the order to return fire, it turned away. Prize only fired a few shots before the U-boat quickly submerged and got away.

Prize undertook another patrol in late June and early July. On 22 June, while at sea, various awards to the crew who fought in the action on 30 April was announced; Sanders was to receive the Victoria Cross while his lieutenant received the Distinguished Service Order (DSO), two other officers the Distinguished Service Cross, and the rest of the crew the Distinguished Service Medal.

Prize embarked on her final patrol in early August 1917. Sailing into the Atlantic under a Swedish flag, the ship was accompanied by a British submarine, HMS D6. It was intended that D6 would submerge and observe Prize throughout the day. When an enemy ship was sighted, the crew of Prize would place discreet signals in the rigging to indicate the ship's position to the watching D6. The submarine would then attempt to move into a position where it could torpedo the approaching enemy. On 13 August 1917, a lookout spotted UB-48. Sanders opted to use the guns of Prize to shell the U-boat; UB-48 was undamaged and it submerged to evade the attack. Prize and D6 remained on station. Later that evening, UB-48, having worked its way into a suitable position, fired two torpedoes at Prize, one of which struck and destroyed the sailing ship. D6, still submerged, heard the explosion and at dawn it surfaced to investigate but found no trace of Prize or her crew.
