= USS Nemes =

United States Navy patrol boat

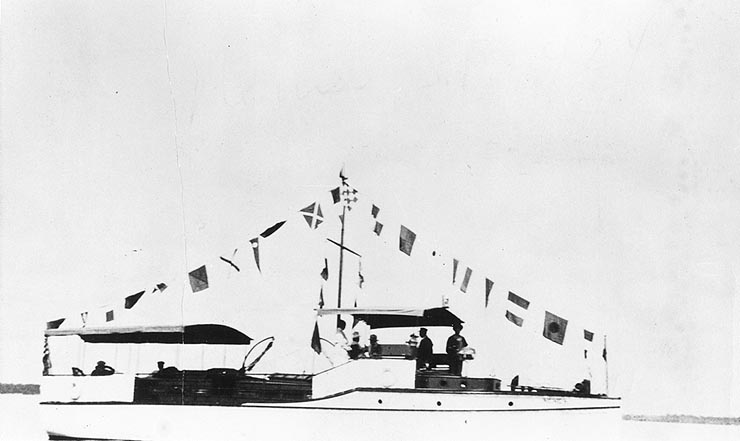
- Nemes as a private motorboat, sometime between 1909 and 1917.

History

United States
- Name: USS Nemes
- Namesake: Previous name retained
- Builder: Van Deise, Camden, New Jersey
- Completed: 1909
- Acquired: 10 July 1917
- Commissioned: July 1917
- Fate: Exploded and sank 21 August 1917
- Notes: Operated as private motorboat Nemes 1909-1917

General characteristics
- Type: Patrol vessel
- Tonnage: 18 gross register tons
- Length: 50 ft 2 in (15.29 m)
- Beam: 10 ft 5 in (3.18 m)
- Draft: 2 ft 6 in (0.76 m)
- Speed: 12 knots
- Armament: 1 × 1-pounder gun; 1 × machine gun

USS Nemes (SP-424) was a United States Navy patrol vessel commissioned in July 1917 and sunk in August 1917.

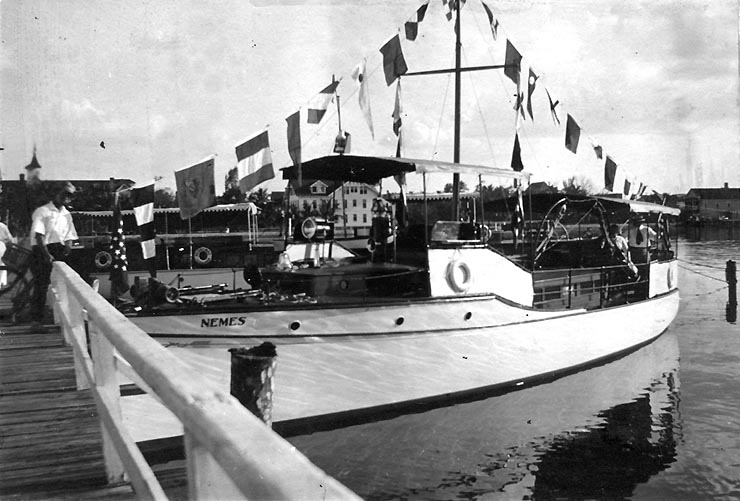
Nemes as a private motorboat sometime between 1909 and 1917.

Nemes was built as a private motorboat of the same name in 1909 by Van Deise at Camden, New Jersey. On 10 July 1917, the U.S. Navy acquired her from her owner, J. C. Noblit of Germantown, Pennsylvania, for use as a section patrol boat during World War I. She was commissioned soon afterwards as USS Nemes (SP-424).

Assigned to the 7th Naval District headquartered at Key West, Florida, Nemes moved south to Key West to begin patrol duties there. In August 1917, scheduled to patrol around Key West, she pulled into nearby Cotteral Bay for cleaning. While she was there, an explosion rocked her on 21 August 1917, causing her to burn and sink. There were no deaths, but six men were burned.
