= SS Gro (1895) =

History
- Name: Alagonia; Ros; Gro
- Owner: E. F. and W. Roberts (1895–1899); John Herron and Co. (1898–1899); Lord Curzon Shipping Co. (1899); Palatine Shipping Co. (1899–1903); Rederi A/B Union (1903–1916); D/S A/S Avenir (1916–1917)
- Port of registry: (United Kingdom) Liverpool, England; United Kingdom Manchester, England; Sweden Stockholm, Sweden; Norway Christiania, Norway
- Builder: William Hamilton and Company, Port Glasgow, Scotland
- Launched: 30 January 1895
- Completed: 16 March 1895
- Identification: Official number: 102199
- Fate: Sunk by submarine, 22 August 1917

General characteristics
- Type: Freighter
- Tonnage: 2,699 gross register tons (GRT); 1,728 net register tons (NRT)
- Length: 309.7 ft (94.4 m)
- Beam: 42.6 ft (13.0 m)
- Draught: 20.5 ft (6.2 m)
- Installed power: 241 nhp
- Propulsion: 1 screw propeller; 1 triple-expansion steam engine

SS Gro was a small freighter built in Scotland during the 1890s. Completed in 1895, she was sold to A Swedish company in 1903 and then to a Norwegian company in 1916. During the First World War the ship was sunk by the German submarine SM UC-47 in August 1917.

== Description ==
Gro had an overall length of 309.7 feet (94.4 m), with a beam of 42.6 feet (13.0 m) and a draught of 20.5 feet (6.2 m). The ship was assessed at 2,699 gross register tons (GRT) and 1,728 net register tons (NRT). She had a vertical triple-expansion steam engine driving a single screw propeller. The engine was rated at 241 nominal horsepower.

== Construction and career ==
Gro was laid down as yard number 118 by William Hamilton and Company at its shipyard in Port Glasgow, Scotland, for E. F. and W. Roberts. The ship was launched on 30 January 1895 as Alagonia and completed on 16 March. She was sold to John Herron and Co. of Liverpool on 6 December 1898 and was transferred to the Lord Curzon Steam Ship Co. on 3 January 1899. The ship was to have been renamed Lord Curzon, but she was sold to the Palatine Shipping Co. of Manchester, England, on 16 November before this was done.

Alagonia was sold on 16 March 1903 to Rederi A/B Union of Stockholm, Sweden, and renamed Ros. The ship was sold to D/S A/S Avenir of Christiania, Norway, and renamed Gro in 1916. She was enroute to Rouen, France, from Glasgow, Scotland, with a cargo of coal when she was torpedoed and sunk by UC-47 five miles (8.0 km) east of Start Point Lighthouse on 22 August 1917.

== Bibliography ==
- Fenton, Roy (December 2022). "Levers' Early Shipping Ventures: Bromport Steamship Co., Ltd. and its Predecessors". Marine News Supplement. 76 (12): S340 – S352. ISSN 0966-6958.
