= SS Esemplare (1902) =

History
- Name: Delamere; Esemplare
- Namesake: Italian for "exemplary"
- Owner: Watson Steamship Co. (1902–1914); Joseph Constant (1914); Alfio Napoli (1914–1917)
- Port of registry: (United Kingdom) Manchester; (United Kingdom) London; (Kingdom of Italy) Catania, Italy
- Builder: Anderson Rodger and Company, Port Glasgow, Scotland
- Launched: 30 October 1902
- Completed: 22 November 1902
- Identification: Official number: 113119
- Fate: Scuttled by submarine, 7 August 1917

General characteristics
- Type: Freighter
- Tonnage: 1,102 gross register tons (GRT); 678 net register tons (NRT)
- Length: 224.7 ft (68.5 m)
- Beam: 34.1 ft (10.4 m)
- Draught: 14.3 ft (4.4 m)
- Installed power: 130 nhp; 800 ihp (600 kW)
- Propulsion: 1 screw propeller; 1 triple-expansion steam engine
- Speed: 10 knots (19 km/h; 12 mph)

SS Esemplare [ezemˈplaːre] was a small freighter built during the first decade of the 20th century. Completed in 1902, she was intended for the West African trade. Sold to an Italian company shortly before the beginning of the First World War in 1914, the ship was captured and scuttled by the German submarine SM UC-27 in August 1917.

== Description ==
Esemplare had an overall length of 224.7 feet (68.5 m), with a beam of 34.1 feet (10.4 m) and a draught of 14.3 feet (4.4 m). The ship was assessed at 1,102 gross register tons (GRT) and 678 net register tons (NRT). She had a vertical triple-expansion steam engine driving a single screw propeller. The engine was rated at a total of 130 nominal horsepower and produced 800 indicated horsepower (600 kW). This gave her a maximum speed of 10 knots (19 km/h; 12 mph).

== Construction and career ==
Esemplare was laid down as yard number 366 by Anderson Rodger and Company at its shipyard in Port Glasgow, Scotland, for the Watson Steamship Co. The ship was launched on 30 October 1902 and completed on 22 November as Delamere. Named either for Delamere, Cheshire, or the Delamere Forest, she was sold to Joseph Constant on 8 January 1914. Twelve days later, the ship was sold to Alfio Napoli was registered in Catania, Italy, with the name Esemplare. The ship was captured by UC-27 at coordinates 35°04′N 11°34′E on 7 July 1915 and scuttled.

== Bibliography ==
- Fenton, Roy (December 2022). "Levers' Early Shipping Ventures: Bromport Steamship Co., Ltd. and its Predecessors". Marine News Supplement. 76 (12): S340–S352. ISSN 0966-6958.
