= List of shipwrecks in October 1916 =

The list of shipwrecks in October 1916 includes ships sunk, foundered, grounded, or otherwise lost during October 1916.

== 1 October ==
List of shipwrecks: 1 October 1916
Ship	State	Description
Cap Mazagan	France	World War I: The coaster was scuttled in the Atlantic Ocean 31 nautical miles (57 km) south West of the Longships Lighthouse (49°30′N 5°32′W) by SM UB-38 (Imperial German Navy). Her crew survived.
Le Blavet	France	World War I: The cargo ship was sunk in the Atlantic Ocean 38 nautical miles (70 km) south of the Longships Lighthouse (49°32′N 5°38′W) by SM UB-38 (Imperial German Navy).
Le Pelerin	France	World War I: The fishing vessel was shelled and sunk in the Atlantic Ocean 31 nautical miles (57 km) south south east of the Longships Lighthouse (49°35′N 5°49′W) by SM UB-38 (Imperial German Navy). Her crew survived.
Mallin	Norway	World War I: The coaster was sunk in the Atlantic Ocean 30 nautical miles (56 km) south of the Wolf Rock, Cornwall, United Kingdom by SM UB-38 (Imperial German Navy). Her crew survived.
Musette	United Kingdom	World War I: The schooner was scuttled in the Atlantic Ocean off Ouessant, Finistère (49°12′N 5°20′W) by SM UB-38 (Imperial German Navy). Her crew survived.
Pelikan	Imperial German Navy	The Vorpostenboot was lost on this date.
Vanellus	United Kingdom	World War I: The cargo ship struck a mine placed by SM U-26 (Imperial German Navy) and sank in the English Channel off Le Havre, Seine-Inférieure, France with the loss of three of her crew.
Villebois Mareuil	France	World War I: The sailing vessel was sunk in the Atlantic Ocean 20 nautical miles (37 km) south south east of the Wolf Rock (49°37′N 5°36′W) by SM UC-26 (Imperial German Navy).

== 2 October ==
List of shipwrecks: 2 October 1916
Ship	State	Description
HMT Filey	Royal Navy	The naval trawler was lost on this date.
HMT Girl Eva	Royal Navy	World War I: The naval trawler struck a mine placed by SM UC-6 (Imperial German Navy) and sank in the North Sea with the loss of seven of her crew.
Huntsfall	United Kingdom	World War I: The cargo ship was torpedoed and sunk in the Aegean Sea 12 nautical miles (22 km) south south east of Skyros, Greece by SM UB-46 (Imperial German Navy). Her crew survived.
Lotusmere	United Kingdom	World War I: The collier was torpedoed and sunk in the Barents Sea 48 nautical miles (89 km) north north east of the Teriberski Lighthouse (69°58′N 35°30′E) by SM U-48 (Imperial German Navy). Her crew survived.
Rigel	French Navy	World War I: The Arabis-class sloop was sunk in the Mediterranean Sea 150 nautical miles (280 km) east of Cape Palos, Spain (37°45′N 2°15′E) by SM U-35 (Imperial German Navy). Her crew survived.

== 3 October ==
List of shipwrecks: 3 October 1916
Ship	State	Description
Ada	Norway	World War I: The cargo ship was sunk in the Atlantic Ocean 15 nautical miles (28 km) south of the Wolf Rock, Cornwall, United Kingdom by SM UC-26 (Imperial German Navy). Her crew survived.
J. Y. Short	United Kingdom	World War I: The cargo ship was shelled and sunk in the Barents Sea 80 nautical miles (150 km) east of Vardø, Finnmark county, Norway (70°14′N 35°30′E) by SM U-43 (Imperial German Navy). Her crew survived.
La Fraternite	France	World War I: The barque was sunk in the Atlantic Ocean 20 nautical miles (37 km) north west of Île Vierge, Finistère by SM UB-38 (Imperial German Navy).
Lindum	United Kingdom	The 106-foot (32 m) trawler was wrecked on rocks at Thornwick Nebb in Thornwick Bay, north of Flamborough Head. She later slid off the rocks, sinking in 9-metre (30 ft) of water. Her crew was rescued from her boat by Rameses (United Kingdom).
Samos	Greece	World War I: The cargo ship was sunk in the Mediterranean Sea south of Mallorca, Spain by SM U-35 (Imperial German Navy).
Tourgai	Russia	World War I: The cargo ship was scuttled in the Barents Sea of the North Cape, Finnmark county (70°14′N 33°03′E) by SM U-43 (Imperial German Navy).
Unnamed naval barge	Austro-Hungarian Navy	World War I: A barge was destroyed during the Flămânda Offensive.

== 4 October ==
List of shipwrecks: 4 October 1916
Ship	State	Description
Birk	Norway	World War I: The coaster was sunk in the Mediterranean Sea 37 nautical miles (69 km) north of Philipeville, Algeria (38°32′N 7°25′E) by SM U-35 (Imperial German Navy). Her crew survived.
Brantingham	United Kingdom	World War I: The cargo ship was torpedoed and sunk in the Barents Sea 70 nautical miles (130 km) north north east of Vardø, Finnmark county, Norway by SM U-46 (Imperial German Navy) with the loss of all 24 crew.
Brink	Norway	World War I: The cargo ship was sunk in the Barents Sea (50 nautical miles (93 km) north east of Vardø in Finnmark county by SM U-48 (Imperial German Navy). Her crew survived.
Franconia	United Kingdom	World War I: The troopship was torpedoed and sunk in the Mediterranean Sea 195 nautical miles (361 km) east of Malta by SM UB-47 (Imperial German Navy) with the loss of twelve of her 314 crew. Survivors were rescued by HMHS Dover Castle (Royal Navy).
Gallia	French Navy	World War I: The armed merchant cruiser was torpedoed and sunk in the Mediterranean Sea 35 nautical miles (65 km) south west of San Pietro Island, Italy (38°27′N 7°30′E) by SM U-35 (Imperial German Navy) with the loss of 1,338 of the approximately 2,000 people on board.
Jennie Bullas	United Kingdom	World War I: The fishing vessel was scuttled in the North Sea 14 nautical miles (26 km) east north east of the Spurn Lightship (United Kingdom) by SM UB-19 (Imperial German Navy). Her crew survived.
Jersey	United Kingdom	World War I: The fishing vessel was scuttled in the North Sea 16 nautical miles (30 km) north east by east of the Spurn Lightship (United Kingdom) by SM UB-19 (Imperial German Navy). Her crew survived.
Rado	United Kingdom	World War I: The fishing vessel was scuttled in the North Sea 15 nautical miles (28 km) north east by east of the Spurn Lightship (United Kingdom) by SM UB-19 (Imperial German Navy). Her crew survived.
Risholm	Norway	World War I: The cargo ship was sunk in the Atlantic Ocean 12 nautical miles (22 km) west south west of Ouessant, Finistère, France by SM UC-26 (Imperial German Navy). Her crew survived.

== 5 October ==
List of shipwrecks: 5 October 1916
Ship	State	Description
Aurora	Italy	World War I: The cargo ship was sunk in the Mediterranean Sea 50 nautical miles (93 km) south west of Cape Carbonara, Sardinia by SM U-35 (Imperial German Navy). Her crew survived.
Cederic	Norway	World War I: The cargo ship was torpedoed and sunk in the Atlantic Ocean 18 nautical miles (33 km) south of the Wolf Rock, Cornwall, United Kingdom (49°40′N 5°42′W) by SM UB-38 (Imperial German Navy). Her crew survived.
Cantatrice	France	World War I: The sailing vessel was sunk in the Atlantic Ocean 12 nautical miles (22 km) south of the Wolf Rock, Cornwall, United Kingdom by SM UB-38 (Imperial German Navy).
Countess of Derby	United Kingdom	The schooner was driven ashore west of Dieppe, Seine-Inférieure and was a total loss. Her crew were rescued.
Grace Davis	United States	The schooner foundered in the Atlantic Ocean off Cape Breton Island, Nova Scotia, Canada.
Isle of Hastings	United Kingdom	World War I: The cargo ship was scuttled in the Atlantic Ocean 10 nautical miles (19 km) south by west of Ouessant, Finistère, France (48°18′N 5°08′W) by SM UC-26 (Imperial German Navy). Her crew survived.
Rosenvold	Norway	World War I: The coaster was sunk in the Atlantic Ocean 15 nautical miles (28 km) south of the Wolf Rock (49°50′N 6°00′W) by SM UB-38 (Imperial German Navy).
Rover	United Kingdom	World War I: The fishing vessel was scuttled in the North Sea 10 nautical miles (19 km) east north east of the Spurn Lightship (United Kingdom) by SM UB-19 (Imperial German Navy). Her crew survived.
St. Nikolai	Russia	World War I: The sailing vessel was sunk in the Black Sea (45°55′N 32°06′E) by SM UB-42 (Imperial German Navy). Her crew survived.
Vera	Sweden	World War I: The cargo ship was sunk in the Mediterranean Sea 45 nautical miles (83 km) south of Cape Carbonara by SM U-35 (Imperial German Navy). Her crew survived.

== 6 October ==
List of shipwrecks: 6 October 1916
Ship	State	Description
Erika	Russia	World War I: The cargo ship was sunk in the Barents Sea off the Kola Peninsula by SM U-46 (Imperial German Navy).
Independent	United States	The 151-net register ton steam fishing vessel was abandoned after she was wrecked on a reef 3 nautical miles (5.6 km; 3.5 mi) off Middleton Island off the south-central coast of the Territory of Alaska. Her crew of 38 survived.
Lanterna	United Kingdom	World War I: The cargo ship struck a mine and sank in the North Sea 2.5 nautical miles (4.6 km) north east of Cromer, Norfolk. Her crew survived.
Tuva	Sweden	World War I: The cargo ship was sunk in the Barents Sea 70 nautical miles (130 km) north of North Cape, Finnmark county, Norway by SM U-48 (Imperial German Navy). Her crew survived. Swedish official history puts the date for the sinking to Oct 7.

== 7 October ==
List of shipwrecks: 7 October 1916
Ship	State	Description
Asvald	Norway	The brig was dismasted in the English Channel and was abandoned by her crew. She was later towed into Fishguard, Pembrokeshire in a waterlogged condition.
Jupiter	United Kingdom	World War I The cargo ship was damaged in the North Sea by SM UB-27 (Imperial German Navy). She was towed to the Pentland Firth and was beached. Later refloated, repaired and returned to service.

== 8 October ==
List of shipwrecks: 8 October 1916
Ship	State	Description
Blommersdijk	Netherlands	World War I: The cargo ship was shelled and sunk in the Atlantic Ocean east of the Nantucket Lightship ( United States Lighthouse Service) (40°40′N 69°36′W) by SM U-53 (Imperial German Navy). Her crew were rescued by a United States Navy destroyer.
Christian Knudsen	Norway	World War I: The tanker was sunk in the Atlantic Ocean 14 nautical miles (26 km) south south east of the Nantucket Lightship ( United States Lighthouse Service) by SM U-53 (Imperial German Navy). Her crew were rescued by a United States Navy destroyer, or by .
Magnus	United Kingdom	World War I: The 105.5-foot (32.2 m), 154-ton steam trawler was captured and scuttled in the North Sea 40 nautical miles (74 km) east north east of the Longstone Lighthouse, Northumberland by SM UB-27 (Imperial German Navy). Her crew survived.
Sevastopol	Imperial Russian Navy	The Gangut-class battleship ran aground off Helsinki, Grand Duchy of Finland. She was refloated on 12 October with assistance from the Icebreakers Ermak, Sampo, Tarmo and Tsar Mikhail Fedorovich (all Russia) and taken in to Kronstadt.
Stephano	United Kingdom	World War I: The passenger ship was torpedoed and sunk in the Atlantic Ocean 2.5 nautical miles (4.6 km) off the Nantucket Lightship ( United States Lighthouse Service) by SM U-53 (Imperial German Navy). All 154 people on board were rescued by a United States Navy destroyer.
Strathdene	United Kingdom	World War I: The cargo ship was torpedoed and sunk in the Atlantic Ocean 20 nautical miles (37 km) south south east of the Nantucket Lightship ( United States Lighthouse Service) by SM U-53 (Imperial German Navy). Her crew survived. Her crew were rescued by a United States Navy destroyer, or by P. L. M. 4 (Argentina), or made it to the Nantucket Lightship.
West Point	United Kingdom	World War I: The cargo ship was scuttled in the Atlantic Ocean 46 nautical miles (85 km) south east by east of the Nantucket Lightship ( United States Lighthouse Service) (40°25′N 69°00′W) by SM U-53 (Imperial German Navy). Her crew were rescued by a United States Navy destroyer.

== 9 October ==
List of shipwrecks: 9 October 1916
Ship	State	Description
Astoria	United Kingdom	World War I: The cargo ship was torpedoed and sunk in the Barents Sea 120 nautical miles (220 km) north west by west of Vardø, Finnmark county, Norway by SM U-46 (Imperial German Navy) with the loss of seventeen crew.
Canowie	United Kingdom	The barque was wrecked on Chiloe Island, Chile with the loss of all hands.
HDMS Dykkeren	Royal Danish Navy	The submarine collided with a Norwegian cargo ship and sank in the Øresund with the loss of her captain.

== 10 October ==
List of shipwrecks: 10 October 1916
Ship	State	Description
Götha Lejon	Sweden	The wooden schooner was last heard from departing the Stockholm archipelago bound for Finland. No information is available as to the cause of the disappearance. Four casualties.
Elax	United Kingdom	World War I: The tanker was torpedoed and sunk in the Mediterranean Sea 70 nautical miles (130 km) west south west of Cape Matapan, Greece (35°54′N 21°19′E) by SM UB-43 (Imperial German Navy). Her crew survived.
Gardepee	United Kingdom	World War I: The cargo ship was scuttled in the Barents Sea 70 nautical miles (130 km) north north east of the North Cape, Finnmark county, Norway by SM U-43 (Imperial German Navy). Her crew survived.

== 11 October ==
List of shipwrecks: 11 October 1916
Ship	State	Description
Bistritza	Romania	World War I: The cargo ship was sunk in the Barents Sea 70 nautical miles (130 km) north of the coast of Finnmark county, Norway by SM U-43 (Imperial German Navy).
Crosshill	United Kingdom	World War I: the cargo ship was torpedoed and sunk in the Mediterranean Sea 60 nautical miles (110 km) west of Malta (36°11′N 12°53′E) by SM UB-47 (Imperial German Navy) with only thirteen survivors out of eighteen hundred.
Imperatritsa Ekaterina Velikaya	Imperial Russian Navy	The Imperatritsa Mariya-class battleship ran aground off Sevastopol. She was refloated and take in to Sevastopol for repairs.
Iolo	United Kingdom	World War I: The collier was torpedoed and sunk in the Barents Sea 153 nautical miles (283 km) north of Vardø, Finnmark (72°50′N 32°00′E) by SM U-46 (Imperial German Navy). Her crew survived.

== 12 October ==
List of shipwrecks: 12 October 1916
Ship	State	Description
Sebek	United Kingdom	World War I: The cargo ship was damaged in the Mediterranean Sea off Gozo, Malta by SM UB-47 (Imperial German Navy). She was beached but was later refloated, repaired and returned to service.

== 13 October ==
List of shipwrecks: 13 October 1916
Ship	State	Description
Cora	United States	The barge sank just west of Point Judith, Rhode Island, a total loss. One crew member was killed. Her master was rescued.
Henriette	United Kingdom	The schooner was driven ashore at Porthleven, Cornwall. She broke up two days later and was a total loss.
Margaretha	Italy	World War I: The cargo ship was sunk in the Gulf of Taranto (40°01′N 17°44′E) by SM U-4 (Austro-Hungarian Navy).
Mercator	Finland	World War I: The cargo ship struck a mine and sank in the English Channel off Boulogne, Pas-de-Calais (50°45′N 0°46′E). Her crew survived.
Welsh Prince	United Kingdom	World War I: The cargo ship was torpedoed and sunk in the Mediterranean Sea 33 nautical miles (61 km) south west of Cape Matapan, Greece (36°00′N 22°50′E) by SM UB-43 (Imperial German Navy) with the loss of two of her crew.

== 14 October ==
List of shipwrecks: 14 October 1916
Ship	State	Description
Annunziata	Italy	World War I: The sailing vessel was sunk in the Mediterranean Sea off Syracuse, Sicily by SM UB-47 (Imperial German Navy).
Elena	Italy	World War I: The sailing vessel was sunk in the Mediterranean Sea off Syracuse by SM UB-47 (Imperial German Navy).
Il Nuovo Concettina	Italy	World War I: The sailing vessel was sunk in the Mediterranean Sea off Syracuse by SM UB-47 (Imperial German Navy).
Il Nuovo S. Luigi	Italy	World War I: The sailing vessel was sunk in the Mediterranean Sea off Syracuse by SM UB-47 (Imperial German Navy).
Il Redentore	Italy	World War I: The sailing vessel was sunk in the Mediterranean Sea off Syracuse by SM UB-47 (Imperial German Navy).
Robur	Sweden	The cargo ship foundered in the Baltic Sea off Gotland. Her crew survived.

== 15 October ==
List of shipwrecks: 15 October 1916
Ship	State	Description
Avis	Greece	World War I: The cargo ship was shelled and sunk in the Mediterranean Sea 12 nautical miles (22 km) south of Punta Stilo (37°49′N 16°44′E) by SM UB-47 (Imperial German Navy).
Ponce De León	Spanish Navy	The Ponce De León-class gunboat was sunk in a collision with San Jose (flag unknown) near the mouth of the Guadalquivir River near Chempiona.

== 16 October ==
List of shipwrecks: 16 October 1916
Ship	State	Description
Anna	Sweden	The wooden schooner was last heard from departing Travemünde bound for Sweden. No information is available on the cause of the disappearance. Six casualties.
Busy Bee	United Kingdom	The schooner was driven ashore at Bude, Cornwall and was wrecked.
J. E. Bodwell	United States	The schooner foundered in the Atlantic Ocean off Sandy Hook, New Jersey.

== 17 October ==
List of shipwrecks: 17 October 1916
Ship	State	Description
Botnia	Norway	World War I: The cargo ship struck a mine and sank in the White Sea 10 nautical miles (19 km) north of Mayak Gorodetsky, Russia (67°48′N 41°05′E). Her crew survived.
Edam	Norway	World War I: The cargo ship was sunk 45 nautical miles (83 km) west by south of the Feie Lighthouse by SM U-43 (Imperial German Navy). Her crew survived.
Midsland	Germany	World War I: The cargo ship was scuttled at Bruges, West Flanders, Belgium. She was raised in 1920, repaired and returned to service.
Nembo	Regia Marina	World War I: The destroyer was torpedoed and sunk in the Adriatic Sea at 40°08′N 019°30′E by the submarine SM U-16 (Austro-Hungarian Navy).
Pacific	Netherlands	The schooner was abandoned in the North Sea. Her crew were rescued by the trawler Anna Josens (Netherlands).
Selina Mary	United Kingdom	The ketch struck a rock and foundered in the Bristol Channel off Ilfracombe, Devon. Her crew survived.
Sten	Norway	World War I: The cargo ship was sunk in the North Sea off the Farne Islands, United Kingdom (57°00′N 4°02′E) by SM UB-35 (Imperial German Navy). Her crew survived.
U-16	Austro-Hungarian Navy	World War I: The Type UB I submarine was sunk in a battle with Nembo (Regia Marina) and Bormida (Italy) with the loss of eleven of her thirteen crew.

== 18 October ==
List of shipwrecks: 18 October 1916
Ship	State	Description
Athene	Norway	World War I: The cargo ship was sunk in the North Sea 10 nautical miles (19 km) south west by west of Hvidingsö by SM U-32 (Imperial German Navy). Her crew survived.
Ethel Duncan	United Kingdom	World War I: The collier was torpedoed and sunk in the Atlantic Ocean 40 nautical miles (74 km) west north west of Noop Head, Orkney Islands (59°25′N 4°36′W) by SM U-20 (Imperial German Navy). Her crew survived.
Greta	Sweden	World War I: The barque was sunk in the Skaggerak 9 nautical miles (17 km) off the Hirtshals Lighthouse, Nordjylland, Denmark (57°47′N 9°56′E) by SM U-71 (Imperial German Navy). Her crew survived.

== 19 October ==
List of shipwrecks: 19 October 1916
Ship	State	Description
Alaunia	United Kingdom	World War I: The troopship struck a mine and sank in the English Channel off Hastings, Sussex with the loss of two lives.
Cottica	Norway	World War I: The sailing vessel was sunk in the North Sea (56°41′N 2°56′E) by SM UB-35 (Imperial German Navy). Her crew survived.
Czarita	Imperial Russian Navy	World War I: The cargo ship was sunk in the Black Sea off Cape Midia, Romania (44°31′N 29°16′E) by SM UB-42 (Imperial German Navy).
Dido	Norway	World War I: The coaster was scuttled in the North Sea by SM UB-35 (Imperial German Navy). Her crew survived.
Fritz Emil	Denmark	World War I: The schooner was scuttled in the North Sea 130 nautical miles (240 km) west of Lindesnes in Lister og Mandal county, Norway by SM UC-20 (Imperial German Navy). Her crew survived.
Guldaas	Norway	World War I: The sailing vessel was sunk in the North Sea (56°41′N 2°56′E) by SM UB-35 (Imperial German Navy). Her crew survived.
Jug	Russia	World War I: The ship was sunk by SM UC-25 (Imperial German Navy).
Mercur	Sweden	World War I: The cargo ship was sunk in the Skaggerak 10 nautical miles (19 km) east of the Skagen Lightship (Denmark) by SM U-71 (Imperial German Navy). Her crew survived.
Normandie	Sweden	World War I: The cargo ship was scuttled in the North Sea 20 nautical miles (37 km) west north west of the Vinga Lighthouse by SM U-71 (Imperial German Navy). Her crew survived.
Penylan	United Kingdom	World War I: The collier was torpedoed and sunk in the Mediterranean Sea 5 nautical miles (9.3 km) west by north of Cape Bougaroni, Algeria (37°07′N 6°26′E) by SM U-39 (Imperial German Navy). Her crew survived.
Theodor	Sweden	World War I: The wooden barque, en route from Härnösand to Amsterdam, struck a mine in the Ålands hav and was later condemned. The crew survived
Tunkhannock	United States	The schooner barge sank off new Jersey after springing a leak on 18 October, a total loss.

== 20 October ==
List of shipwrecks: 20 October 1916
Ship	State	Description
Barbara	United Kingdom	World War I: The cargo ship was shelled and sunk in the English Channel 25 nautical miles (46 km) south of the Isle of Wight (50°18′N 1°20′W) by SM UB-40 (Imperial German Navy). Her crew survived.
Cabotia	United Kingdom	World War I: The cargo ship was shelled and sunk in the Atlantic Ocean 120 nautical miles (220 km) west north west of Tory Island, County Donegal (55°16′N 11°16′W) by SM U-69 (Imperial German Navy) with the loss of 32 crew.
Cliburn	United Kingdom	World War I: The coaster was scuttled in the English Channel 30 nautical miles (56 km) off St. Catherine's Point, Isle of Wight by SM UB-18 (Imperial German Navy). Her crew survived.
D. L. Filer	United States	Black Friday Storm: The schooner foundered off the mouth of the Detroit River in 18 feet (5.5 m) of water. Her crew climbed the masts, but five died when her fore mast broke, another slipped from the aft mast and was swept away. Her captain was rescued from the aft mast by Western States (United States).
Drafn	Norway	World War I: The coaster was sunk in the North Sea (57°01′N 6°20′E) by SM UB-22 (Imperial German Navy). Her crew survived.
Guldborg	Denmark	World War I: The cargo ship was sunk in the North Sea off Coquet Island, Northumberland, United Kingdom (57°20′N 3°23′E) by SM UB-35 (Imperial German Navy). Her crew survived.
Huguenot	United Kingdom	World War I: The cargo ship struck a mine and sank in the North Sea four nautical miles (7.4 km) north east of the Sunk Lightship (51°55′45″N 1°40′30″E). Her crew survived.
Imperatritsa Mariya	Imperial Russian Navy	Imperatritsa Mariya, 1919 The Imperatritsa Mariya-class battleship caught fire, exploded and sank at Sevastopol with the loss of 228 of her 1,213 crew. She was refloated on 18 May 1918 and scrapped in 1926.
James B. Colgate	United States	Black Friday Storm: The whaleback cargo ship sprang a leak off Long Point, Ontario and sank in an extremely severe gale in Lake Erie with the loss of 22 or 24 crew. Her captain was the sole survivor, rescued by the ferry Marquette and Bessemer No. 2 (United States) off Rondeau Provincial Park.
Lekna	Sweden	World War I: The barquentine was sunk in the North Sea (55°40′N 0°10′W) by SM UB-21 (Imperial German Navy). Her crew survived.
Libra	Denmark	World War I: The schooner was sunk in the North Sea (57°13′N 2°47′E) by SM UB-35 (Imperial German Navy). Her crew survived.
Marshall F. Butters	United States	Black Friday Storm: The cargo ship foundered in Lake Erie. Her crew was rescued by Frank R. Billings (United States) and F. G. Hartwell (flag unknown).
Merida	United States	Black Friday Storm: The cargo ship sank in an extremely severe gale in Lake Erie with the loss of all 23 crew.
Midland	United Kingdom	World War I: The cargo ship was scuttled in the English Channel 60 nautical miles (110 km) east of Ouessant, Finistère, France (48°55′N 3°46′W) by SM UB-39 (Imperial German Navy). Her crew survived.
Mombassa	United Kingdom	World War I: The cargo ship was torpedoed and sunk in the Mediterranean Sea eight nautical miles (15 km) north west by west of Cape Corbelin, Algeria (37°00′N 4°10′E) by SM U-39 (Imperial German Navy) with the loss of a crew member.
Randi	Norway	World War I: The sailing vessel was sunk in the North Sea by SM UB-21 (Imperial German Navy). Her crew survived.
Secundo	Norway	World War I: The cargo ship was sunk in the English Channel 25 nautical miles (46 km) north of the Triagoz Lighthouse, Finistère (49°11′N 3°54′W) by SM UB-39 (Imperial German Navy). Her crew survived.
Svartvik	Sweden	World War I: The brig was sunk in the North Sea by SM UB-21 (Imperial German Navy). Her crew survived.
The Duke	United Kingdom	World War I: The coaster was shelled and sunk in the English Channel 40 nautical miles (74 km) north north east of Cap la Hève, Seine-Inférieure, France by SM UB-18 (Imperial German Navy). Her crew survived.
The Marchioness	United Kingdom	World War I: The coaster was shelled and sunk in the English Channel 30 nautical miles (56 km) off Fécamp, Manche by SM UB-18 (Imperial German Navy). Her crew survived.

== 21 October ==
List of shipwrecks: 21 October 1916
Ship	State	Description
Antoinette	Sweden	World War I: The sailing vessel was sunk in the Skaggerak by SM UB-22 (Imperial German Navy). Her crew survived.
August	Sweden	World War I: The barque was sunk in the Baltic Sea off the Finngrundet Lightship (Sweden) by SM UB-30 (Imperial German Navy). Her crew survived.
Brizeux	France	World War I: The barque was sunk in the English Channel 12 nautical miles (22 km) north north west of the Casquets, Channel Islands (49°51′N 2°48′W) by SM UB-18 (Imperial German Navy). Her crew survived.
Cape Girardeau	United States	The steamer sank off Fort Gage, Illinois.
Cock O' the Walk	United Kingdom	World War I: The sailing vessel was shelled and sunk in the English Channel 30 nautical miles (56 km) north north west of the Les Hanois Lighthouse, Guernsey, Channel Islands (49°42′N 3°05′W) by SM UB-40 (Imperial German Navy). Her crew survived.
Condor	France	World War I: The barque was sunk in the English Channel 10 nautical miles (19 km) north west of the Casquets by SM UB-18 (Imperial German Navy). Her crew survived.
Fart III	Norway	World War I: The coaster was sunk in the English Channel 25 nautical miles (46 km) south south west of Beachy Head, Sussex, United Kingdom by SM UB-29 (Imperial German Navy). Her crew survived.
Fortuna	Netherlands	The cargo ship foundered in the English Channel with some loss of life.
Fulvio	Norway	World War I: The coaster was sunk in the English Channel 12 nautical miles (22 km) north north west of the Casquets by SM UB-18 (Imperial German Navy). Her crew survived.
Grit	United Kingdom	World War I: The barge was shelled and sunk in the English Channel 25 nautical miles (46 km) south of Beachy Head by SM UB-29 (Imperial German Navy). Her crew survived.
Grønhaug	Norway	World War I: The coaster was sunk in the North Sea (55°39′N 0°57′E) by SM UB-21 (Imperial German Navy). Her crew survived.
Hebe	Denmark	World War I: The coaster was sunk in the Atlantic Ocean 12 nautical miles (22 km) north west of Aber Wrac'h, Finistère, France by SM UB-39 (Imperial German Navy). Her crew survived.
Helga	Denmark	World War I: The cargo ship was sunk in the Atlantic Ocean 10 nautical miles (19 km) north west of the Île de Batz, Finistère by SM UB-39 (Imperial German Navy). Her crew survived.
Julia	France	World War I: The schooner was sunk in the Atlantic Ocean 15 nautical miles (28 km) north of the Le Four Lighthouse, Finistère by SM UB-23 (Imperial German Navy).
Princess May	United Kingdom	World War I: The ketch was scuttled in the English Channel 25 nautical miles (46 km) south of Beachy Head by SM UB-29 (Imperial German Navy). Her crew survived.
Priscilla	Canada	The schooner stranded on Oyster Point near Woodmont, Connecticut.
Rabbi	Norway	World War I: The coaster was sunk in the English Channel north west of the Casquets (49°47′N 2°30′W) by SM UB-18 (Imperial German Navy). Her crew survived.
Raftsund	Norway	World War I: The coaster was sunk in the North Sea 70 nautical miles (130 km) south west of Stavanger, Norway (58°20′N 2°42′E) by SM UB-35 (Imperial German Navy). Her crew survived.
Rønnaug	Norway	World War I: The cargo ship was sunk in the Skaggerak 8 to 10 nautical miles (15 to 19 km) off the town of Risør, Nedenes county (58°39′N 10°04′E) by SM U-71 (Imperial German Navy). Her crew survived.
Snestad	Norway	The cargo ship was sunk in the Atlantic Ocean 10 nautical miles (19 km) north north west of the Île Vierge Lighthouse, Finistère by SM UB-23 (Imperial German Navy). Her crew survived.
Stacker Lee	United States	The steamer sank 4 miles above Memphis, Tennessee.
Theodor	Norway	World War I: The cargo ship was sunk in the North Sea (56°35′N 3°30′E) by SM UB-22 (Imperial German Navy). Her crew survived.
Ull	Norway	World War I: The cargo ship was sunk in the North Sea 70 nautical miles (130 km) east by north of Rattray Head, Aberdeenshire, United Kingdom (57°48′N 0°03′E) by SM UB-34 (Imperial German Navy). Her crew survived.
William and Emma	Royal National Lifeboat Institution	The lifeboat was wrecked at Salcombe, Devon with the loss of thirteen of her fifteen crew.

== 22 October ==
List of shipwrecks: 22 October 1916
Ship	State	Description
Alix	Norway	World War I: The cargo ship was torpedoed and sunk in the English Channel 15 nautical miles (28 km) west of the Triagoz Lighthouse (49°10′N 3°40′W) by SM UB-39 (Imperial German Navy). Her crew survived.
Caerloch	Norway	World War I: The coaster was sunk in the North Sea (56°00′N 1°36′E) by SM UB-22 (Imperial German Navy). Her crew survived.
Cluden	United Kingdom	World War I: The cargo ship was torpedoed and sunk in the Mediterranean Sea 11 nautical miles (20 km) west of Cape Ténès, Algeria (36°33′N 1°14′E) by SM U-39 (Imperial German Navy) with the loss of four crew.
Effort	United Kingdom	World War I: The trawler was shelled and sunk in the North Sea 30 nautical miles (56 km) east north east of Buchan Ness, Aberdeenshire by SM UB-34 (Imperial German Navy). Her crew survived.
HMT Fame	Royal Navy	The naval trawler was lost on this date.
Fortuna	Netherlands	World War I: The cargo ship struck a mine and sank in the English Channel 7.5 nautical miles (13.9 km) west by south of Beachy Head, Sussex (50°41′N 0°16′W).
Georges M. Embiricos	Greece	World War I: The cargo ship was sunk in the English Channel 18 nautical miles (33 km) south east of The Lizard, Cornwall, United Kingdom (49°50′N 4°40′W) by SM UB-29 (Imperial German Navy).
Gunn	Norway	World War I: The barque was sunk in the North Sea (56°11′N 2°17′E) by SM UB-22 (Imperial German Navy). Her crew survived.
London	Denmark	World War I: The schooner was sunk in the North Sea (55°56′N 1°36′E) by SM UB-21 (Imperial German Navy). Her crew survived.
Maris Stella	France	World War I: The sailing vessel was sunk in the English Channel 5 nautical miles (9.3 km) north of Île Vierge, Finistère by SM UB-40 (Imperial German Navy). Her crew survived.
Nina	Italy	World War I: The cargo ship was sunk in the Mediterranean Sea 10 nautical miles (19 km) west of Cape Ténès (36°28′N 0°56′E) by SM U-39 (Imperial German Navy). Her crew survived.
Ravn	Norway	World War I: The coaster was sunk in the Mediterranean Sea 16 nautical miles (30 km) north west of the Cape Ténès Lighthouse by SM U-39 (Imperial German Navy). Her crew survived.
Risøy	Norway	World War I: The cargo ship was sunk in the Atlantic Ocean 15 nautical miles (28 km) north of Ouessant, Finistère (48°45′N 5°05′W) by SM UB-40 (Imperial German Navy). Her crew survived.
Theodosi Tschernigowski	Russia	World War I: The cargo ship was sunk in the Barents Sea off Vaidaguada by SM U-56 (Imperial German Navy). Her crew survived.
Thor	Norway	World War I: The auxiliary sailing vessel was scuttled in the North Sea 125 nautical miles (232 km) east of Grimsby, Lincolnshire, United Kingdom (55°51′N 2°09′E) by SM UB-21 (Imperial German Navy). Her crew survived.
W. Harkness	United Kingdom	World War I: The cargo ship was scuttled in the Mediterranean Sea 17 nautical miles (31 km) off Cape Ténès (36°32′N 1°00′E) by SM U-39 (Imperial German Navy). Her crew survived.

== 23 October ==
List of shipwrecks: 23 October 1916
Ship	State	Description
Alf	Denmark	World War I: The schooner was sunk in the Bay of Biscay west of L'Orient, Morbihan, France (47°35′N 4°02′W) by SM UB-23 (Imperial German Navy). Her crew survived.
Antoine Alloisa	France	World War I: The fishing vessel was sunk in the English Channel by SM UB-23 (Imperial German Navy).
Arromanches	France	World War I: The cargo ship was sunk in the Atlantic Ocean south of Ireland by SM U-20 (Imperial German Navy).
Bayreaulx	United Kingdom	World War I: The cargo ship was sunk in the Atlantic Ocean (50°27′N 11°24′W) by SM U-63 (Imperial German Navy) with the loss of all 23 crew.
Chieri	Italy	World War I: The cargo ship was sunk in the Atlantic Ocean south of Ireland (49°15′N 8°12′W by SM U-20 (Imperial German Navy).
Elly	Sweden	World War I: The ship was sunk in the Gulf of Bothnia off Mäntyluoto, Finland by SM UB-30 (Imperial German Navy). Her crew survived.
Felix Lewis	France	World War I: The three-masted schooner was sunk in the Atlantic Ocean 120 nautical miles (220 km) south west of the Bishop Rock, Isles of Scilly, United Kingdom by SM U-20 (Imperial German Navy).
HMS Genista	Royal Navy	World War I: The Arabis-class sloop was sunk in the Atlantic Ocean west of Ireland (51°26′N 13°10′W) by SM U-57 (Imperial German Navy) with the loss of 73 crew.
Gladys	Isle of Man	The ketch foundered in the Irish Sea off Douglas with the loss of all hands.
Regina	Norway	World War I: The barque was sunk in the North Sea 50 nautical miles (93 km) east of Aberdeen, United Kingdom by SM UB-34 (Imperial German Navy) with the loss of two crew.
Rensfjell	Norway	World War I: The cargo ship was sunk in the Barents Sea 24 nautical miles (44 km) east of Vardø, Finnmark county by SM U-56 (Imperial German Navy). Her crew survived.
Saint Pierre	France	World War I: The schooner was shelled and sunk in the Bay of Biscay 6 nautical miles (11 km) south of Guilvinec, Finistère (47°45′N 4°32′W) by SM UB-23 (Imperial German Navy).
SMS T64	Imperial German Navy	World War I: The S7-class torpedo boat struck a mine and sank in the Baltic Sea.
Tuncurry	Australia	The coaster sprang a leak and sank off Broken Bay, New South Wales.
Venus II	Norway	World War I: The coaster was sunk in the Bay of Biscay 7 nautical miles (13 km) west of Point Penmarc'h, Finistère (47°45′N 4°32′W) by SM UB-23 (Imperial German Navy). Her crew survived.

== 24 October ==
List of shipwrecks: 24 October 1916
Ship	State	Description
Anna Gurine	Norway	World War I: The cargo ship was sunk in the English Channel 30 nautical miles (56 km) south of the Longships Lighthouse (United Kingdom) by SM UB-29 (Imperial German Navy). Her crew survived.
Arvid	Sweden	The cargo ship foundered in the Ålands Sea. Her crew were rescued.
Cannebière	France	World War I: The barque was sunk in the Atlantic Ocean 20 nautical miles (37 km) south south west of the Bishop Rock, Isles of Scilly, United Kingdom (49°32′N 6°30′W) by SM UB-18 (Imperial German Navy).
Clearfield	United Kingdom	World War I: The tanker was sunk in the Atlantic Ocean off the Flannan Islands by SM U-55 (Imperial German Navy) with the loss of all 32 crew.
Elin	Russia	World War I: The schooner was sunk in the Gulf of Bothnia off Rauma, Finland by SM UB-30 (Imperial German Navy).
Framfield	United Kingdom	World War I: The cargo ship struck a mine placed by SM UC-11 (Imperial German Navy) and sank in the North Sea 3 nautical miles (5.6 km) north east of the Sunk Lightship (United Kingdom) with the loss of six of her crew.
Ingersoll	Russia	World War I: The sailing vessel was sunk in the Gulf of Bothnia off Rauma by SM UB-30 (Imperial German Navy).
Jenny Lind	Russia	World War I: The sailing vessel was sunk in the Gulf of Bothnia off Rauma by SM UB-30 (Imperial German Navy).
Lobo	Australia	The barque was wrecked 30 nautical miles (56 km) south of Angoche, Portuguese East Africa. Her crew survived.
Propontis	Greece	World War I: The sailing vessel was sunk in the Ionian Sea by SM U-73 (Imperial German Navy).
Sidmouth	United Kingdom	World War I: The cargo ship was torpedoed and sunk in the English Channel 22 nautical miles (41 km) south of the Wolf Rock, Cornwall (49°35′N 5°44′W) by SM UB-29 (Imperial German Navy). Her crew survived.
Sola	Norway	World War I: The cargo ship was sunk in the Atlantic Ocean 82 nautical miles (152 km) west of the Bishop Rock, Isles of Scilly, United Kingdom by SM U-69 (Imperial German Navy). Her crew survived.
Twig	United Kingdom	World War I: The schooner was scuttled in the English Channel 15 nautical miles (28 km) north of Alderney, Channel Islands by SM UB-37 (Imperial German Navy). Her crew survived.
Urpo	Russia	World War I: The auxiliary sailing vessel was sunk in the Gulf of Bothnia off Rauma by SM UB-30 (Imperial German Navy).

== 25 October ==
List of shipwrecks: 25 October 1916
Ship	State	Description
Comtesse de Flandre	Belgium	World War I: The cargo ship was captured in the English Channel 34 nautical miles (63 km) west north west of the Casquets, Channel Islands by SM UB-19 (Imperial German Navy). She was shelled and sunk.
Dag	Norway	World War I: The cargo ship was sunk in the Barents Sea 3 nautical miles (5.6 km) off Berlevåg, Finnmark county by SM U-56 (Imperial German Navy). Her crew survived.
Fanny C. Bowen	United States	The schooner foundered in the Atlantic Ocean. Her crew survived.
Polceverra	Italy	World War I: The cargo ship was sunk in the Mediterranean Sea 30 nautical miles (56 km) south east of Santa Maria di Leuca, Apulia (39°54′N 19°45′E) by SM U-15 (Austro-Hungarian Navy). Her crew survived.
Polruan	United Kingdom	The collier struck a rock and foundered in the North Sea off Whitby, Yorkshire.

== 26 October ==
List of shipwrecks: 26 October 1916
Ship	State	Description
HMT Datum	Royal Navy	World War I: The naval trawler was sunk by enemy action with some loss of life.
Iduna	France	World War I: The schooner was scuttled in the English Channel 50 nautical miles (93 km) south south west of Start Point, Devon (49°32′N 4°23′W) by SM UB-19 (Imperial German Navy). Her crew were rescued by Garly (Norway).
HMT Lord Roberts	Royal Navy	World War I: The naval trawler struck a mine placed by SM UC-11 (Imperial German Navy) and sank in the North Sea off the Shipwash Lightship (United Kingdom) (51°55′40″N 1°41′00″E) with the loss of nine of her crew.
Lysland	Norway	World War I: The cargo ship was sunk in the North Sea 26 nautical miles (48 km) south west of Skudeneshavn in Stavanger county by SM U-30 (Imperial German Navy). Her crew survived.
Marina G	Italy	World War I: The brigantine was sunk in the Strait of Sicily (37°15′N 11°35′E) by SM U-21 (Imperial German Navy).
North Wales	United Kingdom	World War I: The cargo ship was torpedoed and sunk in the Atlantic Ocean south west of the Isles of Scilly by SM U-69 (Imperial German Navy) with the loss of all 30 crew.
Oola	United Kingdom	World War I: The collier was scuttled in the Barents Sea 25 nautical miles (46 km) north east by north of North Cape, Norway in Finnmark county (70°30′N 26°24′E) by SM U-56 (Imperial German Navy). Her crew survived.
Pan	Norway	World War I: The coaster was shelled and sunk in the English Channel 7 nautical miles (13 km) north of the Casquets, Channel Islands (49°54′N 2°20′W) by SM UB-18 (Imperial German Navy). Her crew survived.
Rappahannock	United Kingdom	World War I: The cargo ship was sunk in the Atlantic Ocean 70 nautical miles (130 km) off the Isles of Scilly by SM U-69 (Imperial German Navy) with the loss of 37 crew.
HMT Roburn	Royal Navy	World War I: The naval trawler was sunk in the Strait of Dover by Kaiserliche Marine torpedo boat destroyers with some loss of life.
Rowanmoor	United Kingdom	World War I: The cargo ship was torpedoed and sunk in the Atlantic Ocean 128 nautical miles (237 km) west north west of the Fastnet Rock (51°30′N 12°58′W) by SM U-57 (Imperial German Navy). Her crew survived, but her captain was taken as a prisoner of war.
Saint Yves	France	World War I: The schooner was sunk in the Bay of Biscay west of Belle Île, Morbihan by SM UB-23 (Imperial German Navy).
The Queen	United Kingdom	World War I: The passenger ship was captured in the North Sea (50°54′N 1°19′E) by SMS V80. She was torpedoed and sunk by SMS S60 (both Imperial German Navy).
Titan	United Kingdom	World War I: The trawler was shelled and sunk in the North Sea 74 nautical miles (137 km) north east of the Longstone Lighthouse, Northumberland by SM UB-34 (Imperial German Navy). Her crew survived.
Valborg	Denmark	World War I: The cargo ship was sunk in the Mediterranean Sea west of Algiers, Algeria (37°31′N 4°50′E) by SM U-34 (Imperial German Navy). Her crew survived.

== 27 October ==
List of shipwrecks: 27 October 1916
Ship	State	Description
HMT Ajax II	Royal Navy	The naval trawler was lost on this date.
Blanc Nez	French Navy	World War I: The naval trawler struck a mine placed by SM UC-26 (Imperial German Navy) and sank in the Strait of Dover with the loss of seventeen of her crew.
Bygdø	Norway	World War I: The cargo ship struck a mine and sank in the North Sea (52°23′N 1°47′E). Her crew survived.
Ellen	Sweden	World War I: The sailing vessel was sunk in the North Sea by SM U-58 (Imperial German Navy). Her crew survived.
HMS Flirt	Royal Navy	World War I: Battle of Dover Strait: The Star-class destroyer was torpedoed and sunk in the Strait of Dover by Kaiserliche Marine torpedo boat destroyers.
HMT Gleaner of the Sea	Royal Navy	The naval trawler was lost on this date.
HMT Launch Out	Royal Navy	The naval trawler was lost on this date.
HMS Nubian	Royal Navy	HMS Nubian World War I, Battle of Dover Strait: The Tribal-class destroyer was torpedoed and damaged by a Kaiserliche Marine destroyer and was beached. She was subsequently salvaged, with her stern section being joined to the bow section of HMS Zulu (Royal Navy), the new ship being named HMS Zubian.
Sabine	France	The ketch was driven ashore at St. Sampson's, Guernsey, Channel Islands and was wrecked. Her crew were rescued by the pilot boat Stork (United Kingdom).
Sif	Denmark	World War I: The coaster was sunk in the North Sea (55°30′N 0°28′W) by SM UB-22 (Imperial German Navy). Her crew survived.
HMT Waveney II	Royal Navy	World War I: Battle of Dover Strait: The naval trawler was sunk in the Strait of Dover by Kaiserliche Marine torpedo boat destroyers.
HMT Spotless Prince	Royal Navy	World War I: The naval trawler was torpedoed and sunk in the Strait of Dover by a Kaiserliche Marine torpedo boat destroyer.
Stemshest	Norway	World War I: The coaster was sunk in the North Sea (56°28′N 3°15′E) by SM UB-35 (Imperial German Navy). Her crew survived.

== 28 October ==
List of shipwrecks: 28 October 1916
Ship	State	Description
Angeliki	Greece	World War I: The passenger ship was torpedoed and sunk in the Aegean Sea 3 nautical miles (5.6 km) off Faliro with the loss of about 50 of the 400-plus people on board. Survivors were rescued by a Greek merchant ship and a French Navy destroyer.
HMHS Galeka	United Kingdom	(Red Cross): World War I: The hospital ship struck a mine at Le Havre, Seine-Inférieure, France (43°49′N 0°05′E) with the loss of 19 lives and was beached. She was declared a total loss.
HMT Bradford	Royal Navy	The naval trawler was lost on this date.
Germaine	Greece	World War I: The cargo ship was sunk in the Mediterranean Sea 8 nautical miles (15 km) off Cape San Antonio, Spain (39°00′N 0°40′W) by SM U-34 (Imperial German Navy).
Gilda R	Italy	World War I: The sailing vessel was sunk in the Mediterranean Sea south east of Corsica, France by SM U-21 (Imperial German Navy).
Kazanets	Imperial Russian Navy	World War I: The Ukraina-class destroyer struck a mine and sank in the Baltic Sea off Osmussaar, Estonia.
Lanao	United States	World War I: The coaster was captured and sunk with explosives in the Atlantic Ocean 30 nautical miles (56 km) off Cape St. Vincent, Portugal (36°45′N 8°25′W) by SM U-63 (Imperial German Navy). Her crew was taken aboard the submarine until transferred to Tromp (Norway).
Marina	United Kingdom	World War I: The cargo ship was torpedoed and sunk in the Atlantic Ocean 30 nautical miles (56 km) west of the Fastnet Rock by SM U-55 (Imperial German Navy) with the loss of eighteen crew.
Rio Pirahy	United Kingdom	World War I: The cargo ship was scuttled in the Atlantic Ocean 60 nautical miles (110 km) south of Cape St. Vincent by SM U-63 (Imperial German Navy). Her crew survived.
Saint Charles	France	World War I: The schooner was sunk in the English Channel (48°37′N 5°10′W) by SM UB-29 (Imperial German Navy). Her crew survived.
Selene	Italy	World War I: The cargo ship was shelled and sunk in the Atlantic Ocean 30 nautical miles (56 km) south east of Cape Santa María, Portugal by SM U-63 (Imperial German Navy). Her crew survived.
Sparta	United Kingdom	World War I: The cargo ship struck a mine placed by SM UC-4 (Imperial German Navy) and sank in the North Sea with the loss of four of her crew.
HMT Speedwell V	Royal Navy	The naval trawler was driven onto the Splaugh Rock, in the Irish Sea, and sank with the loss of all ten crew.
Torsdal	Norway	World War I: The cargo ship was sunk in the Atlantic Ocean 25 nautical miles (46 km) off Cape St. Vincent by SM U-63 (Imperial German Navy). Her crew survived.
Tre Fratelli D	Italy	World War I: The brigantine was sunk in the Mediterranean Sea south east of Corsica (41°26′N 9°42′E) by SM U-21 (Imperial German Navy).

== 29 October ==
List of shipwrecks: 29 October 1916
Ship	State	Description
Falkefjell	Norway	World War I: The cargo ship was sunk in the North Sea (55°42′N 1°02′E) by SM UB-22 (Imperial German Navy). Her crew survived.
Maria Therese	France	World War I: The auxiliary schooner was scuttled in the Mediterranean Sea 20 nautical miles (37 km) south of the Columbretes Islands, Spain (39°35′N 0°41′E) by SM U-34 (Imperial German Navy). Her crew survived.
Massalia	Greece	World War I: The cargo ship was sunk in the Atlantic Ocean 135 nautical miles (250 km) west of Gibraltar by SM U-63 (Imperial German Navy). Her crew survived.
Meroë	United Kingdom	World War I: The cargo liner was torpedoed and sunk in the Atlantic Ocean 70 nautical miles (130 km) west of Cape Trafalgar, Spain (36°00′N 7°35′W) by SM U-63 (Imperial German Navy). Her crew survived.
Torino	United Kingdom	World War I: The cargo ship was torpedoed and sunk in the Atlantic Ocean 70 nautical miles (130 km) west of Cape Trafalgar (36°00′N 7°40′W) by SM U-63 (Imperial German Navy) with the loss of a crew member.
Tridonia	United Kingdom	The barque was driven ashore at Oxwich Point, Glamorgan with the loss of three of the 23 people on board. She was on a voyage from Dublin to Buenos Aires, Argentina.
Western Lass	United Kingdom	The schooner was driven ashore at Horsey, Norfolk and was wrecked.
Zumaya	Spain	The cargo ship foundered in the Atlantic Ocean 3 nautical miles (5.6 km) off Salvora with the loss of all but one of her crew.

== 30 October ==
List of shipwrecks: 30 October 1916
Ship	State	Description
Floreal	United Kingdom	World War I: The trawler was scuttled in the Atlantic Ocean 20 nautical miles (37 km) north by west of the Flannan Islands by SM U-57 (Imperial German Navy). Her crew survived.
Gayret-i-Vataniye	Ottoman Navy	The S165-class destroyer was beached at Varna, Bulgaria.
Marquis Bacquehem	United Kingdom	World War I: The cargo ship was torpedoed and sunk in the Atlantic Ocean 50 nautical miles (93 km) south by east of Cape St. Vincent, Portugal by SM U-32 (Imperial German Navy). Her crew survived.
Nellie Bruce	United Kingdom	World War I: The trawler was shelled and sunk in the Atlantic Ocean off Beru Fjord, Iceland by SM U-24 (Imperial German Navy). Her crew survived.
SMS Neptun	Imperial German Navy	The Vorpostenboot was lost on this date.
Saint Hubert	French Navy	World War I: The naval trawler struck a mine placed by SM UC-26 (Imperial German Navy) and sank in the English Channel 1 nautical mile (1.9 km) north west of Cherbourg, Seine-Inférieure with the loss of sixteen of her crew.
Vertunno	Italy	World War I: The cargo ship was sunk in the Atlantic Ocean west of Gibraltar (36°34′N 8°47′W) by SM U-32 (Imperial German Navy). Her crew survived.

== 31 October ==
List of shipwrecks: 31 October 1916
Ship	State	Description
HMS Adriatic	Royal Navy	The collier departed Newport, Monmouthshire for Marseille, Bouches-du-Rhône, France. No further trace, presumed lost in the Atlantic Ocean with the loss of all hands.
Delto	Norway	World War I: The cargo ship was sunk in the Mediterranean Sea (37°10′N 0°10′E) by SM U-63 (Imperial German Navy). Her crew survived.
Fedelta	Italy	World War I: The cargo ship was sunk in the Mediterranean Sea 12 nautical miles (22 km) west of Cape Palos, Murcia, Spain by SM U-63 (Imperial German Navy). Her crew survived.
Glenlogan	United Kingdom	World War I: The cargo ship was torpedoed and sunk in the Mediterranean Sea 10 nautical miles (19 km) south east of Stromboli, Italy (38°46′N 15°22′E) by SM U-21 (Imperial German Navy). Her crew survived.
Kiki Issaias	Greece	World War I: The cargo ship struck a mine and sank in the Mediterranean Sea off Fleves. Her crew survived.
Saturn	Norway	World War I: The cargo ship was sunk in the Atlantic Ocean 60 nautical miles (110 km) north of the Shetland Islands (60°04′N 5°07′W) by SM U-57 (Imperial German Navy). Her crew survived.
Tridonia	United Kingdom	The barque was driven ashore at Oxwich Point, Glamorgan with the loss of three of her crew.

== Unknown date ==
List of shipwrecks: Unknown date 1916
Ship	State	Description
Fuchsia	United Kingdom	World War I: The trawler was sunk in the North Sea by enemy action. Her crew were taken as prisoners of war.
Kathinka	Norway	World War I: The cargo ship was sunk by enemy action.
L. Edward Hines	Nicaragua	1916 Pensacola hurricane: The steamer sank on 13, 15, or 18 October 45 miles (72 km) east of British Honduras in the Caribbean Sea. One American crewman drifted ashore nine days later, two others reached Utilla Island after thirteen days, one was rescued by fishermen after drifting for six days.
Tweed	United Kingdom	World War I: The schooner was sunk by enemy action.
Vigilant	United States Virgin Islands	The schooner sank in a hurricane. Subsequently refloated, repaired and returned to service.
