= Highlander (ship) =

Several vessels have been named Highlander:

== Highlander (1805 ship) ==
- Highlander (1805 ship) was launched at Sunderland in 1805 as a West Indiaman, trading with Demerara. She was captured in 1807, returned to British ownership, and was wrecked in 1809.

== Highlander (1810 ship) ==
- Highlander (1810 ship), of 209 tons (bm), was launched in Denmark in 1807, almost certainly under another name, and taken in prize. Highlander first appeared in the Register of Shipping (RS) in 1810. Highlander first appeared in Lloyd's Register (LR) in 1811. On 5 January 1811, Highlander, Holmes, master, cut from her anchors and cables in Portland Roads and ran onshore to the north of the harbour at Weymouth, Dorset. She had been on her way from St. Domingo to London. The initial expectation was that her materials and cargo could be saved. She was refloated on 21 January and taken in to Weymouth. Highlander, Cuthbert, master, was wrecked on 15 July 1812 on the Carysfort Reef. She was on a voyage from Jamaica to London. The great part of her cargo was saved.

== Highlander (1891 ship) ==
- Highlander (1891 ship), of 2,490 GRT, was a steam screw steamer launched at Southwick in 1891. On 26 October 1916 U56 captured and scuttled Highlander at 70°30′N 26°24′E. She was sailing from Newcastle to Alexandrovsk with a cargo of coal.

== See also ==
- HMS Highlander – one of two vessels of that name serving the Royal Navy
- Highland Chief (ship)
