= U51 =

U51 may refer to:

- German submarine U-51, various vessels
- HMS Milford (U51), a sloop of the Royal Navy
- Small dodecahemidodecahedron
- Small nucleolar RNA SNORD51
