= German submarine U-51 =

U-51 may refer to one of the following German submarines:

- SM U-51, the lead ship of the Type U 51 class of submarines; launched in 1915 and that served in the First World War until sunk 14 July 1916
  - During the First World War, Germany also had these submarines with similar names:
    - SM UB-51, a Type UB III submarine launched in 1917 and surrendered 16 January 1919; broken up at Swansea in 1922
    - SM UC-51, a Type UC II submarine launched in 1916 and sunk 17 November 1917
- German submarine U-51 (1938), a Type VIIB submarine that served in the Second World War until sunk on 20 August 1940
