= German submarine U-56 =

U-56 may refer to one of the following German submarines:

- SM U-56, a Type U 51 submarine launched in 1916 and that served in the First World War until she went missing after 3 November 1916
  - During the First World War, Germany also had these submarines with similar names:
    - SM UB-56, a Type UB III submarine launched in 1917 and sunk on 19 December 1917
    - SM UC-56, a Type UC II submarine launched in 1916 and interned at Santander, Spain, on 24 May 1918. UC-56 sank the British hospital ship Glenart Castle on 26 February 1918.
- German submarine U-56 (1938), a Type IIC submarine that served in the Second World War until sunk 28 April 1945
