= Highland Chief (ship) =

Several vessels have been named Highland Chief:

- Highland Chief (1798 ship) was launched at Calcutta in 1796 and made two voyages for the British East India Company before a French privateer captured her in 1802.
- Highland Chief, of 306 or 380 tons (bm), was launched at Calcutta in 1806. On 5 October 1807 the French frigate Piémontaise captured Highland Chief, Makepiece, master, and took her into Mauritius. She had been carrying 1,000 sacks of wheat and rice, and her value as a prize was 158,796.76 French francs.

== See also ==
- Highlander (ship)
