= SM UB-35 =

Coordinates: 51°3′N 1°46′E

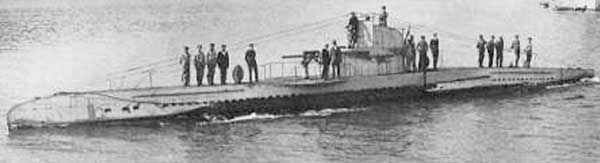
- SM UB-45, a U-boat similar to UB-35

History

German Empire
- Name: UB-35
- Ordered: 22 July 1915
- Builder: Blohm & Voss, Hamburg
- Cost: 1,152,000 German Papiermark
- Yard number: 259
- Launched: 28 December 1915
- Completed: 17 April 1916
- Commissioned: 22 June 1916
- Fate: Sunk 26 January 1918

General characteristics
- Class & type: Type UB II submarine
- Displacement: 274 t (270 long tons) surfaced; 303 t (298 long tons) submerged
- Length: 36.90 m (121 ft 1 in) o/a; 27.90 m (91 ft 6 in) pressure hull
- Beam: 4.37 m (14 ft 4 in) o/a; 3.85 m (12 ft 8 in) pressure hull
- Draught: 3.69 m (12 ft 1 in)
- Propulsion: 1 × propeller shaft; 2 × 6-cylinder diesel engine, 270 PS (200 kW; 270 bhp); 2 × electric motor, 280 PS (210 kW; 280 shp)
- Speed: 9.06 knots (16.78 km/h; 10.43 mph) surfaced; 5.71 knots (10.57 km/h; 6.57 mph) submerged
- Range: 7,030 nmi (13,020 km; 8,090 mi) at 5 knots (9.3 km/h; 5.8 mph) surfaced; 45 nmi (83 km; 52 mi) at 4 knots (7.4 km/h; 4.6 mph) submerged
- Test depth: 50 m (160 ft)
- Complement: 2 officers, 21 men
- Armament: 2 × 50 cm (19.7 in) torpedo tubes; 4 × torpedoes (later 6); 1 × 8.8 cm (3.5 in) Uk L/30 deck gun
- Notes: 42-second diving time

Service record
- Part of: I Flotilla; 18 August 1916 – 1 February 1917; II Flotilla; 1 February – 20 April 1917; Baltic Flotilla; 20 April – 19 July 1917; Flandern Flotilla; 19 July 1917 – 26 January 1918
- Commanders: Oblt.z.S. Rudolf Gebeschus; 22 June – 26 September 1916; Oblt.z.S. Otto von Schrader; 27 September – 5 November 1916; Kptlt. Rudolf Gebeschus; 6 November 1916 – 19 April 1917; Oblt.z.S. Karl Stöter; 20 April 1917 – 26 January 1918
- Operations: 26 patrols
- Victories: 40 merchant ships sunk (38,551 GRT); 2 auxiliary warships sunk (9,188 GRT); 2 merchant ships damaged (642 GRT); 4 merchant ships taken as prize (5,753 GRT)

SM UB-35 was a German Type UB II submarine or U-boat in the German Imperial Navy (German: Kaiserliche Marine) during World War I. The U-boat was ordered on 22 July 1915 and launched on 28 December 1915. She was commissioned into the German Imperial Navy on 22 June 1916 as SM UB-35. (Note: "SM" stands for "Seiner Majestät" (English: His Majesty's) and combined with the U for Unterseeboot would be translated as His Majesty's Submarine.)

The submarine sank 42 ships in 26 patrols. UB-35 was depth charged and sunk by British warships including HMS Leven in the English Channel on 26 January 1918.

== Design ==
A Type UB II submarine, UB-35 had a displacement of 274 tonnes (270 long tons) when at the surface and 303 tonnes (298 long tons) while submerged. She had a total length of 36.90 m (121 ft 1 in), a beam of 4.37 m (14 ft 4 in), and a draught of 3.69 m (12 ft 1 in). The submarine was powered by two Benz six-cylinder diesel engines producing a total 270 metric horsepower (270 shp; 200 kW), two Siemens-Schuckert electric motors producing 280 metric horsepower (210 kW; 280 shp), and one propeller shaft. She was capable of operating at depths of up to 50 metres (160 ft).

The submarine had a maximum surface speed of 9.06 knots (16.78 km/h; 10.43 mph) and a maximum submerged speed of 5.71 knots (10.57 km/h; 6.57 mph). When submerged, she could operate for 45 nautical miles (83 km; 52 mi) at 4 knots (7.4 km/h; 4.6 mph); when surfaced, she could travel 7,030 nautical miles (13,020 km; 8,090 mi) at 5 knots (9.3 km/h; 5.8 mph). UB-35 was fitted with two 50 centimetres (20 in) torpedo tubes, four torpedoes, and one 8.8 cm (3.5 in) Uk L/30 deck gun. She had a complement of twenty-one crew members and two officers and a 42-second dive time.

== Summary of raiding history ==
Date	Name	Nationality	Tonnage (Note: Merchant ship tonnages are in gross register tons. Military vessels are listed by tons displacement.)	Fate
17 October 1916	Sten	Norway	1,046	Sunk
19 October 1916	Cottica	Norway	320	Sunk
19 October 1916	Dido	Norway	333	Sunk
19 October 1916	Guldaas	Norway	636	Sunk
20 October 1916	Guldborg	Denmark	1,569	Sunk
20 October 1916	Libra	Denmark	174	Sunk
21 October 1916	Raftsund	Norway	937	Sunk
27 October 1916	Stemshest	Norway	811	Sunk
5 February 1917	Vestra	United Kingdom	1,021	Sunk
1 April 1917	Camilla	Norway	2,273	Sunk
1 April 1917	Ester	Denmark	1,210	Sunk
2 April 1917	Lord Scarborough	United Kingdom	158	Sunk
4 April 1917	Gibraltar	United Kingdom	188	Sunk
4 April 1917	Maggie Ross	United Kingdom	183	Sunk
6 April 1917	Kongshaug	Norway	380	Sunk
6 April 1917	Lord Kitchener	United Kingdom	158	Sunk
6 April 1917	Recto	United Kingdom	177	Sunk
1 June 1917	Paposo	Norway	1,067	Captured as prize
1 June 1917	Rigmor	Denmark	161	Captured as prize
1 June 1917	Viking	Denmark	2,952	Captured as prize
3 June 1917	Sara	Denmark	1,573	Captured as prize
22 July 1917	Breda	Netherlands	257	Damaged
11 August 1917	HMT Jay	Royal Navy	144	Sunk
6 September 1917	Thisbe	France	1,091	Sunk
7 September 1917	Haakon VII	Norway	2,175	Sunk
8 September 1917	Armorique	France	144	Sunk
8 September 1917	Blanche	France	160	Sunk
8 September 1917	Meeta	Russian Empire	144	Sunk
27 September 1917	Colbert	France	385	Damaged
29 September 1917	Kildonan	United Kingdom	2,118	Sunk
4 October 1917	Perseverance	United Kingdom	30	Sunk
31 October 1917	Phare	United Kingdom	1,282	Sunk
2 November 1917	Bur	Sweden	1,806	Sunk
2 November 1917	Jessie	United Kingdom	332	Sunk
4 November 1917	Gimle	Norway	1,130	Sunk
29 November 1917	Bob	Norway	678	Sunk
29 November 1917	Haugastøl	Norway	2,118	Sunk
1 December 1917	Rion	United Kingdom	50	Sunk
3 December 1917	Livonia	United Kingdom	1,879	Sunk
3 December 1917	Wreathier	United Kingdom	852	Sunk
4 December 1917	Eagle	United Kingdom	182	Sunk
4 December 1917	Helge	Sweden	343	Sunk
23 December 1917	Hilda Lea	United Kingdom	1,328	Sunk
26 December 1917	Skaala	Norway	1,129	Sunk
31 December 1917	Westville	United Kingdom	3,207	Sunk
20 January 1918	HMS Mechanician	Royal Navy	9,044	Sunk
22 January 1918	Molina	Norway	1,122	Sunk
22 January 1918	Serrana	United Kingdom	3,677	Sunk

== Bibliography ==
- Bendert, Harald (2000). Die UB-Boote der Kaiserlichen Marine, 1914-1918. Einsätze, Erfolge, Schicksal (in German). Hamburg: Verlag E.S. Mittler & Sohn GmbH. ISBN 3-8132-0713-7.
- Gröner, Erich; Jung, Dieter; Maass, Martin (1991). U-boats and Mine Warfare Vessels. German Warships 1815–1945. Vol. 2. Translated by Thomas, Keith; Magowan, Rachel. London: Conway Maritime Press. ISBN 0-85177-593-4.
- Rössler, Eberhard (1979). Die deutschen U-Boote und ihre Werften: eine Bilddokumentation über den deutschen U-Bootbau; in zwei Bänden (in German). Vol. I. Munich: Bernard & Graefe. ISBN 3-7637-5213-7.
