= SM UB-30 =

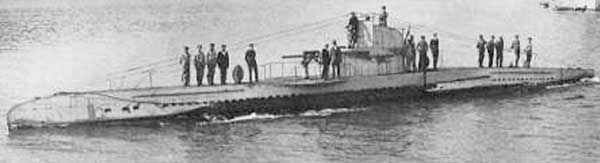
- SM UB-45, a U-boat similar to UB-30

History

German Empire
- Name: UB-30
- Ordered: 22 July 1915
- Builder: Blohm & Voss, Hamburg
- Cost: 1,152,000 German Papiermark
- Yard number: 254
- Launched: 16 November 1915
- Completed: 16 March 1916
- Commissioned: 18 March 1916
- Fate: Sunk 13 August 1918

General characteristics
- Class & type: Type UB II submarine
- Displacement: 274 t (270 long tons) surfaced; 303 t (298 long tons) submerged
- Length: 36.90 m (121 ft 1 in) o/a; 27.90 m (91 ft 6 in) pressure hull
- Beam: 4.37 m (14 ft 4 in) o/a; 3.85 m (12 ft 8 in) pressure hull
- Draught: 3.69 m (12 ft 1 in)
- Propulsion: 1 × propeller shaft; 2 × 6-cylinder diesel engine, 270 PS (200 kW; 270 bhp); 2 × electric motor, 280 PS (210 kW; 280 shp)
- Speed: 9.06 knots (16.78 km/h; 10.43 mph) surfaced; 5.71 knots (10.57 km/h; 6.57 mph) submerged
- Range: 7,030 nmi (13,020 km; 8,090 mi) at 5 knots (9.3 km/h; 5.8 mph) surfaced; 45 nmi (83 km; 52 mi) at 4 knots (7.4 km/h; 4.6 mph) submerged
- Test depth: 50 m (160 ft)
- Complement: 2 officers, 21 men
- Armament: 2 × 50 cm (19.7 in) torpedo tubes; 4 × torpedoes (later 6); 1 × 8.8 cm (3.5 in) Uk L/30 deck gun
- Notes: 42-second diving time

Service record
- Part of: Baltic Flotilla; 8 May 1916 – 23 February 1917; Flandern Flotilla; 23 February 1917 – 13 August 1918
- Commanders: Kptlt. Kurt Schapler; 18 March – 1 October 1916; Oblt.z.S. Freiherr Cassius von Montigny; 2 October 1916 – 7 August 1917; Kptlt. Wilhelm Rhein; 8 August 1917 – 21 April 1918; Oblt.z.S. Rudolf Steir; 22 April – 13 August 1918
- Operations: 19 patrols
- Victories: 18 merchant ships sunk (19,650 GRT); 2 merchant ships damaged (12,007 GRT)

SM UB-30 (Note: "SM" stands for "Seiner Majestät" (English: His Majesty's) and combined with the U for Unterseeboot would be translated as His Majesty's Submarine.) was a German Type UB II submarine or U-boat in the German Imperial Navy (German: Kaiserliche Marine) during World War I. The U-boat was ordered on 22 July 1915 and launched on 16 November 1915. She was commissioned into the German Imperial Navy on 18 March 1916 as SM UB-30.

The submarine sank 18 ships in 19 patrols. They included the William Cory & Son collier SS Vernon in the North Sea off Spurn on 31 August 1917 and the Witherington and Everett Steam Ship Company collier SS Lightfoot in the English Channel off Selsey Bill on 16 March 1918.

UB-30 was sunk by two depth charges from HMS Landrail south of Goodwin Sands at 51°9′N 1°46′E on 13 August 1918.

== Design ==
A Type UB II submarine, UB-30 had a displacement of 274 tonnes (270 long tons) when at the surface and 303 tonnes (298 long tons) while submerged. She had a total length of 36.90 m (121 ft 1 in), a beam of 4.37 m (14 ft 4 in), and a draught of 3.69 m (12 ft 1 in). The submarine was powered by two Benz six-cylinder diesel engines producing a total 270 metric horsepower (270 shp; 200 kW), two Siemens-Schuckert electric motors producing 280 metric horsepower (210 kW; 280 shp), and one propeller shaft. She was capable of operating at depths of up to 50 metres (160 ft).

The submarine had a maximum surface speed of 9.06 knots (16.78 km/h; 10.43 mph) and a maximum submerged speed of 5.71 knots (10.57 km/h; 6.57 mph). When submerged, she could operate for 45 nautical miles (83 km; 52 mi) at 4 knots (7.4 km/h; 4.6 mph); when surfaced, she could travel 7,030 nautical miles (13,020 km; 8,090 mi) at 5 knots (9.3 km/h; 5.8 mph). UB-30 was fitted with two 50 centimetres (20 in) torpedo tubes, four torpedoes, and one 8.8 cm (3.5 in) Uk L/30 deck gun. She had a complement of twenty-one crew members and two officers and a 42-second dive time.

== Summary of raiding history ==
Date	Name	Nationality	Tonnage (Note: Tonnages are in gross register tons)	Fate
21 October 1916	August	Sweden	346	Sunk
23 October 1916	Elly	Sweden	88	Sunk
24 October 1916	Elin	Russian Empire	127	Sunk
24 October 1916	Ingersoll	Russian Empire	239	Sunk
24 October 1916	Jenny Lind	Russian Empire	53	Sunk
24 October 1916	Urpo	Russian Empire	111	Sunk
31 August 1917	Vernon	United Kingdom	982	Sunk
3 September 1917	Ragnhild	United Kingdom	1,495	Sunk
26 September 1917	S.N.A. 3	France	1,709	Sunk
12 November 1917	Morning Star	United Kingdom	129	Sunk
3 January 1918	Gartland	United Kingdom	2,613	Sunk
5 January 1918	Glenarm Head	United Kingdom	3,908	Sunk
12 January 1918	Whorlton	United Kingdom	1,469	Sunk
2 February 1918	Jaffa	United Kingdom	1,383	Sunk
9 February 1918	Armenia	United States	5,463	Damaged
5 March 1918	Clan Mackenzie	United Kingdom	6,544	Damaged
7 March 1918	Braatt II	Norway	1,834	Sunk
16 March 1918	Lightfoot	United Kingdom	1,873	Sunk
18 June 1918	Norfolk Coast	United Kingdom	782	Sunk
10 August 1918	Madame Renee	United Kingdom	509	Sunk

== Bibliography ==
- Bendert, Harald (2000). Die UB-Boote der Kaiserlichen Marine, 1914-1918. Einsätze, Erfolge, Schicksal (in German). Hamburg: Verlag E.S. Mittler & Sohn GmbH. ISBN 3-8132-0713-7.
- Gröner, Erich; Jung, Dieter; Maass, Martin (1991). U-boats and Mine Warfare Vessels. German Warships 1815–1945. Vol. 2. Translated by Thomas, Keith; Magowan, Rachel. London: Conway Maritime Press. ISBN 0-85177-593-4.
- Rössler, Eberhard (1979). Die deutschen U-Boote und ihre Werften: eine Bilddokumentation über den deutschen U-Bootbau; in zwei Bänden (in German). Vol. I. Munich: Bernard & Graefe. ISBN 3-7637-5213-7.
