= SM UB-47 =

German Imperial Navy's Type UB II submarine

History

German Empire
- Name: UB-47
- Ordered: 31 July 1915
- Builder: AG Weser, Bremen
- Yard number: 249
- Laid down: 4 September 1915
- Launched: 17 June 1916
- Commissioned: 4 July 1916
- Decommissioned: 21 July 1917
- Fate: Sold to Austria-Hungary

Service record as UB-47
- Part of: Pola / Mittelmeer Flotilla; 4 July 1916 - 21 July 1917
- Commanders: Oblt.z.S. Wolfgang Steinbauer; 4 July 1916 – 31 March 1917; Oblt.z.S. Hans Hermann Wendlandt; 1 April – 21 July 1917
- Operations: 7 patrols
- Victories: 20 merchant ships sunk (76,195 GRT); 2 warships sunk (11,450 tons); 3 merchant ships damaged (16,967 GRT)

Austria-Hungary
- Name: SM U-47
- Acquired: 21 July 1917
- Commissioned: 30 July 1917
- Fate: Ceded to France as war reparation, 1920; scrapped

Service record as U-47
- Commanders: Otto Molitor; 30 July 1917 – 29 March 1918; Reichsfreiherr Hugo von Seyffertitz; 4 April – 31 October 1918
- Victories: 2 merchant ships sunk (6,201 GRT); 1 warship sunk (351 tons)

General characteristics
- Class & type: As built: Type UB II submarine; After July 1917: U-43-class submarine
- Displacement: 272 t (268 long tons) surfaced; 305 t (300 long tons), submerged
- Length: 36.90 m (121 ft 1 in) o/a; 27.90 m (91 ft 6 in) pressure hull
- Beam: 4.37 m (14 ft 4 in) o/a; 3.85 m (12 ft 8 in) pressure hull
- Draught: 3.68 m (12 ft 1 in)
- Propulsion: 1 × propeller shaft; 2 × 4-stroke 6-cylinder diesel engine, 284 PS (209 kW; 280 bhp); 2 × electric motor, 280 PS (210 kW; 280 shp)
- Speed: 8.82 knots (16.33 km/h; 10.15 mph) surfaced; 6.22 knots (11.52 km/h; 7.16 mph) submerged
- Range: 6,940 nmi (12,850 km; 7,990 mi) at 5 knots (9.3 km/h; 5.8 mph) surfaced; 45 nmi (83 km; 52 mi) at 4 knots (7.4 km/h; 4.6 mph) submerged
- Complement: 22
- Armament: 2 × 50 cm (19.7 in) bow torpedo tubes; 4 torpedoes; 1 × 8.8 cm (3.5 in) SK L/30 deck gun

SM UB-47 was a Type UB II submarine or U-boat for the German Imperial Navy (German: Kaiserliche Marine) during World War I. UB-47 was sold to the Austro-Hungarian Navy (German: Kaiserliche und Königliche Kriegsmarine or K.u.K. Kriegsmarine) during the war. In Austro-Hungarian service the B was dropped from her name and she was known as SM U-47 or U-XLVII as a member of the Austro-Hungarian U-43 class.

UB-47 was ordered in July 1915 and was laid down at the AG Weser shipyard in Bremen in September. UB-47 was a little more than 121 feet (37 m) in length and displaced between 270 and 305 tonnes (266 and 300 long tons), depending on whether surfaced or submerged. She was equipped to carry a complement of four torpedoes for her two bow torpedo tubes and had an 8.8-centimeter (3.5 in) deck gun. As part of a group of six submarines selected for Mediterranean service, UB-47 was broken into railcar sized components and shipped to Pola where she was assembled and launched in June 1916, and commissioned in July. Over the next year the U-boat sank twenty-two ships, which included the French battleship Gaulois and two Cunard Line steamers in use as troopships, Franconia and Ivernia.

The German Imperial Navy was having difficulties in finding trained submarine crews and offered to sell UB-47 and a sister boat UB-43 to the Austro-Hungarian Navy. After the terms were agreed to in June 1917, both boats were handed over at Pola. When commissioned into the Austro-Hungarian Navy, the B in her designation was dropped so that she became U-47 or U-XLVII. She sank an additional three ships in Austro-Hungarian service through the end of the war. U-47 was ceded to France as a war reparation in 1920 and broken at Bizerta that same year.

== Design and construction ==
The German UB II design improved upon the design of the UB I boats, which had been ordered in September 1914. In service, the UB I boats were found to be too small and too slow. A major problem was that, because they had a single propeller shaft/engine combo, if either component failed, the U-boat became almost totally disabled. To rectify this flaw, the UB II boats featured twin propeller shafts and twin engines (one shaft for each engine), which also increased the U-boat's top speed. The new design also included more powerful batteries, larger torpedo tubes, and a deck gun. As a UB II boat, U-47 could also carry twice the torpedo load of her UB I counterparts, and nearly ten times as much fuel. To contain all of these changes the hull was larger, and the surface and submerged displacement was more than double that of the UB I boats.

The Imperial German Navy ordered UB-47 from AG Weser on 31 July 1915 as the final boat of a series of six UB II boats (numbered from UB-42 to UB-47), and the last UB II submarine numerically. (Note: The successor class to the UB II submarines, the UB III type, were numbered beginning with UB-48.) UB-47 was 36.90 metres (121 ft 1 in) long and 4.37 metres (14 ft 4 in) abeam. She had a single hull with saddle tanks and had a draught of 3.68 metres (12 ft 1 in) when surfaced. She displaced 305 tonnes (300 long tons) while submerged but only 272 tonnes (268 long tons) on the surface.

The submarine was equipped with twin Daimler diesel engines and twin Siemens-Schuckert electric motors—for surfaced and submerged running, respectively. UB-47 had a surface speed of up to 8.82 knots (16.33 km/h; 10.15 mph) and could go as fast as 6.22 knots (11.52 km/h; 7.16 mph) while underwater. The U-boat could carry up to 27 tonnes (27 long tons) of diesel fuel, giving her a range of 6,940 nautical miles (12,850 km; 7,990 mi)at 5 knots (9.3 km/h; 5.8 mph). Her electric motors and batteries provided a range of 45 nautical miles (83 km; 52 mi)at 4 knots (7.4 km/h; 4.6 mph) while submerged. UB-47 was equipped with two 50-centimeter (19.7 in) bow torpedo tubes and could carry four torpedoes. The U-boat was also armed with one 8.8 cm (3.5 in) Uk L/30 deck gun.

UB-47 was laid down by AG Weser at its Bremen shipyard on 4 September 1915. As one of six U-boats selected for service in the Mediterranean while under construction, UB-47 was broken into railcar-sized components and shipped overland to the Austro-Hungarian port of Pola. Shipyard workers from Weser assembled the boat and her five sisters at Pola, where she was launched on 17 June.

== German Imperial Navy career ==
SM UB-47 was commissioned into the German Imperial Navy on 4 July 1916 under the command of Oberleutnant zur See Wolfgang Steinbauer. (Note: Oberleutnant zur See Steinbauer was a 28-year-old native of Strassburg, and had been in the Navy's April 1908 cadet class with 46 other future U-boat captains, including Reinhold Saltzwedel. For Steinbauer information, see: Helgason, Guðmundur. "WWI U-boat commanders: Wolfgang Steinbauer". German and Austrian U-boats of World War I - Kaiserliche Marine - Uboat.net. For cadet crew information, see: Helgason, Guðmundur. "WWI Officer Crews: Crew 4/08". German and Austrian U-boats of World War I - Kaiserliche Marine - Uboat.net.) UB-47, Steinbauer's first U-boat command, was assigned to the Navy's Pola Flotilla (German: Deutsche U-Halbflotille Pola) in which she remained throughout her German career. Although the flotilla was based in Pola, the site of the main Austro-Hungarian Navy base, boats of the flotilla operated out of the Austro-Hungarian base at Cattaro which was located farther south and closer to the Mediterranean. German U-boats typically returned to Pola only for repairs.

On 17 August, Steinbauer and UB-47 achieved their first success when they sank the Italian steamer Stampalia south of Cape Matapan. Although Italy and Germany would not formally be at war for another ten days, German U-boats in the Mediterranean routinely attacked Italian vessels by posing as Austro-Hungarian submarines and flying the ensign of that country's navy. Stampalia was an ocean liner of 9,000 gross register tons (GRT) that had formerly been in passenger service between New York and Genoa, and had been one of the first Italian merchant vessels to be armed against submarine attacks. At the time of her sinking, she was in the service of the Italian government but was not carrying any passengers; no casualties from Stampalia were reported in the attack.

Three weeks later, Steinbauer and UB-47 scored a triple kill, sinking three ships on the same day. The British steamer Butetown, en route from Malta to Mudro, was carrying coal and other cargo when she was sent down 55 nautical miles (102 km; 63 mi) west-southwest of Cape Matapan on 8 September. UB-47 attacked Llangorse, another British steamer, 7 nautical miles (13 km; 8.1 mi) away, sending the ship and her cargo of Canadian oats headed to Salonica to the bottom. The third ship was the Greek ship Spetzai, headed from Cyprus to Liverpool when sunk in the same vicinity. There were no casualties from any of the three ships; the crews of Butetown and Llangorse were rescued and landed at Marseille on 16 September.

On 4 October, Steinbauer sank the largest ship of his career when UB-47 torpedoed the 1911 Cunard Line steamer Franconia at position 35°56′N 18°30′E, 195 nautical miles (361 km; 224 mi) east of Malta. The 625-foot (191 m) long, 72-foot (22 m) wide Franconia—nicknamed the "Bath Ship" in civilian days because of the number of passenger baths and showers—was, at 18,510 GRT, the fifth largest ship sunk by a U-boat during World War I. Franconia had been in service as a troopship since February 1915 but was not carrying troops at the time of the attack. The hospital ship Dover Castle picked up 302 survivors from Franconia; 12 men were killed in the attack.

UB-47's next success came a week later, on 11 October, when the 5,002 GRT British steamer Crosshill was sunk west of Malta with the loss of four men. A German military announcement of 20 October proclaiming Steinbauer's sinking of the ship reported that Crosshill's cargo included horses and Serbian grooms. The following day, Sebek, a British ship headed to Alexandria, was torpedoed southeast of Gozo. Although the German Admiralty reported her sunk, (Note: The report misidentified Sebek as Sedek. See: "German U-boats sink British transports". The Atlanta Constitution. 21 October 1916. p. 1.) Sebek's captain was able to ground his ship and prevent it from sinking. (Note: Sebek was not as fortunate in April 1917 when she was sunk by U-70 on the 21st.) On 14 October, UB-47 sank five small Italian sailing vessels—ranging in size from 32 to 80 GRT—near Syracuse, Sicily. The next day, UB-47 closed out the month of October with the sinking of the Greek steamer Avis. UB-47's tally of sunken ships for the month of October came to 24,776 gross register tons, which accounted for nearly 20% of the total sunk by all German U-boats in the Mediterranean.

UB-47 sank the Gaulois in December 1916.

On patrol in the Aegean Sea on 27 December, Steinbauer came across the French pre-dreadnought battleship Gaulois. Although it was screened by light cruisers and naval trawlers, Steinbauer was, nonetheless, able to sink the 11,100-ton displacement ship east of Cerigo. Two men were killed in the initial explosion and another two men died in the aftermath; Gaulois's normal complement was 631 men. Five days later, New Year's Day 1917, UB-47 torpedoed and sank the Cunard Line ship Ivernia—in service as a British troopship—at position 35°30′N 22°53′E, 58 nautical miles (107 km; 67 mi) from Cape Matapan. Under the command of Captain William T. Turner, who had been in command of Lusitania when that liner was sunk in May 1915, the 14,278 GRT Ivernia was ferrying troops to Salonica when sunk by UB-47. Because of the heavy weather at the time of Ivernia's sinking, 120 officers and men and 33 crewmen were killed in the attack. Like Franconia, both Gaulois and Ivernia were among the largest ships sunk by U-boats; Ivernia was the 20th largest sunk. Two days after the attack on Ivernia, UB-47 torpedoed and damaged the British steamer Huntsend, killing one person in the process. The 8,826 GRT Huntsend was the former North German Lloyd liner Lützow, which had been captured by British naval forces in the Mediterranean in August 1914, and, like UB-47, had been built by AG Weser in Bremen. (Note: Huntsend was sold back to North German Lloyd in 1923 and resumed passenger service under her original name of Lützow until she was scrapped in 1933. See: Bonsor, Vol. 2, p. 568–69.)

On 1 March 1917, UB-47 torpedoed and damaged the British steamer Euterpe near Suda Bay, killing two men in the process. A week later, on 8 March, Steinbauer sank his last ship at the helm of UB-47, when Georgian was sent to the bottom 52 nautical miles (96 km; 60 mi) from Cape Sidero. The 1890 British ship, rated at 5,088 gross register tons, was carrying government stores; five of her crew perished in the attack.

On 1 April, Oberleutnant zur See Hans Hermann Wendlandt replaced Steinbauer as commanding officer of UB-47. (Note: Steinbauer went on to command UB-48, the first of the UB III U-boats, and was awarded the Pour le Mérite in March 1918. See: Helgason, Guðmundur. "WWI U-boat commanders: Wolfgang Steinbauer". German and Austrian U-boats of World War I - Kaiserliche Marine - Uboat.net.) A week after assuming his first U-boat command, the 30-year-old Wendlandt scored his first success by sinking two Greek steamers on the same day. Livatho was sailing in ballast from Salonica for New York when she was sunk northwest of Crete by an explosive charge placed by UB-47's crew. Nestos was carrying a load of wheat from New York for Piraeus when shelled and sunk 50 nautical miles (93 km; 58 mi) from Sapientza. Three days later, the British ship Cyfarthfa was torpedoed 32 nautical miles (59 km; 37 mi) from Cerigotto. The master of Cyfarthfa, which had been headed from Oran to Salonica, was taken prisoner by Wendlandt.

The Greek destroyer Doxa, operated by the French Navy, was sunk by UB-47 on 27 June.

Wendlandt and UB-47 sank the Greek destroyer Doxa, a Niki-class destroyer of 350 tonnes (340 long tons) displacement, on 27 June. Although a part of the Royal Hellenic Navy, Doxa had been seized by the French in October 1916 and was operating as a French ship with an all-French crew when torpedoed and sunk by UB-47 in the Straits of Messina; 29 sailors died in the attack. Three days later, Wendlandt sank two Italian sailing ships of about 100 GRT each while east of Sicily. Five days later, UB-47 attacked the Japanese steamer Shinsan Maru, from Karachi with a cargo of wheat for delivery to Italy. Wendlandt torpedoed the 1898 ship between Crete and Sicily. Shinsan Maru was the last ship sunk by UB-47 in her German service.

On 21 July, UB-47 was decommissioned at Pola and handed over to the Austro-Hungarian Navy. In her German Imperial Navy career of just over a year, UB-47 sank twenty merchant ships totaling 76,195 GRT, damaged three ships of 16,967 GRT, and sank two warships with a combined displacement of 11,450 tonnes (11,270 long tons). (Note: Oberleutnant zur See Wendlandt, UB-47's commander at the time she was decommissioned, went on to command the coastal minelayer UC-38 which was sunk by French forces in December 1917; Wendlandt was captured and held by the French until 1920 on charges of war crimes, but ultimately never prosecuted. See: Messimer, p. 272–73.)

== Austro-Hungarian Navy service ==
In November 1916, the German Imperial Navy, having a hard time finding trained submarine crews, inquired to find out if its ally Austria-Hungary was interested in purchasing some of its Mediterranean submarines. A general agreement led to protracted negotiations, which stalled over the outflow of Austro-Hungarian gold reserves to Germany. But, with all of the details worked out, the two parties agreed on the sale of UB-47 and sister ship UB-43 to Austria-Hungary in June 1917. (Note: UB-43 and UB-47 were not the first former Imperial German Navy submarines purchased by the Austro-Hungarian Navy. In 1915 the Austro-Hungarian Navy purchased the German U-boats UB-1 and UB-15 and commissioned them as U-10 and U-11, respectively. See: Gardiner, p. 343.)

When handed over by the Germans on 21 July, UB-47 was in a "worn out condition". Despite the rough condition of the boat, the U-boat was commissioned into the Austro-Hungarian Navy on 30 July 1917 as SM U-47, dropping the B from the U-boat's former designation. Linienschiffsleutnant Otto Molitor was installed as the U-boat's new commander. U-47's first success in Austro-Hungarian service came nearly six months later when, on 12 January 1918, Molitor torpedoed the French steamer Mica from Saigon just short of her destination of Milos.

In early April, Linienschiffsleutnant Reichsfreiherr Hugo von Seyffertitz replaced Molitor as commander of U-47, and a month later, von Seyffertitz achieved his first success as U-47's commander. The British steamer Itinda, a 5,203 GRT ship built in 1900, was sunk north of Susa, Libya, with one man killed. The next victory for von Seyffertitz and U-47 came in September. On the 20th U-47 launched a torpedo attack against the submarine Circé off Cattaro, sinking the French boat.

At the end of the war, U-47 was at Cattaro. In her Austro-Hungarian Navy career, U-47 sank two merchant ships of 6,201 gross register tons, and sank a single warship of 351 tonnes (345 long tons) displacement. U-47 was ceded to France as a war reparation in 1920, towed to Bizerta, and broken up there within a year.

== Summary of raiding history ==
=== As the German UB-47 ===
Ships sunk or damaged by SM UB-47
| Date | Name | Nationality | Tonnage (Note: Merchant ship tonnages are in gross register tons. Military vessels are listed by tons displacement) | Fate |
|---|---|---|---|---|
| 17 August 1916 | Stampalia | Kingdom of Italy | 9,000 | Sunk |
| 8 September 1916 | Butetown | United Kingdom | 3,789 | Sunk |
| 8 September 1916 | Llangorse | United Kingdom | 3,841 | Sunk |
| 8 September 1916 | Spetzai | Greece | 1,904 | Sunk |
| 4 October 1916 | Franconia | United Kingdom | 18,510 | Sunk |
| 11 October 1916 | Crosshill | United Kingdom | 5,002 | Sunk |
| 12 October 1916 | Sebek | United Kingdom | 4,601 | Damaged |
| 14 October 1916 | Annunziata | Kingdom of Italy | 61 | Sunk |
| 14 October 1916 | Elena | Kingdom of Italy | 52 | Sunk |
| 14 October 1916 | Il Nuovo S. Luigi | Kingdom of Italy | 39 | Sunk |
| 14 October 1916 | Il Redentore | Kingdom of Italy | 80 | Sunk |
| 14 October 1916 | La Nuova Concettina | Kingdom of Italy | 32 | Sunk |
| 15 October 1916 | Avis | Greece | 1,000 | Sunk |
| 27 December 1916 | Gaulois | French Navy | 11,100 | Sunk |
| 1 January 1917 | Ivernia | United Kingdom | 14,278 | Sunk |
| 3 January 1917 | Huntsend | United Kingdom | 8,826 | Damaged |
| 1 March 1917 | Euterpe | United Kingdom | 3,540 | Damaged |
| 8 March 1917 | Georgian | United Kingdom | 5,088 | Sunk |
| 8 April 1917 | Livatho | Greece | 2,922 | Sunk |
| 8 April 1917 | Nestos | Greece | 4,060 | Sunk |
| 11 April 1917 | Cyfarthfa | United Kingdom | 3,014 | Sunk |
| 27 June 1917 | Doxa | Hellenic Navy | 350 | Sunk |
| 30 June 1917 | Concettina | Kingdom of Italy | 113 | Sunk |
| 30 June 1917 | Sacra Famiglia | Kingdom of Italy | 98 | Sunk |
| 2 July 1917 | Shinsan Maru | Japan | 3,312 | Sunk |
| | | Sunk: Damaged: Total: | 87,645; 16,967; 104,612 | |

=== As the Austro-Hungarian U-47 ===
Ships sunk or damaged by SM U-47
| Date | Name | Nationality | Tonnage | Fate |
|---|---|---|---|---|
| 12 January 1918 | Mica | France | 998 | Sunk |
| 10 May 1918 | Itinda | United Kingdom | 5,203 | Sunk |
| 20 September 1918 | Circé | French Navy | 351 | Sunk |
| | | Total: | 6,552 | |

== Bibliography ==
- Baumgartner, Lothar; Erwin Sieche (1999). Die Schiffe der k.(u.)k. Kriegsmarine im Bild=Austro-Hungarian warships in photographs (in German). Wien: Verlagsbuchhandlung Stöhr. ISBN 978-3-901208-25-6. OCLC 43596931.
- Bendert, Harald (2000). Die UB-Boote der Kaiserlichen Marine, 1914-1918. Einsätze, Erfolge, Schicksal (in German). Hamburg: Verlag E.S. Mittler & Sohn GmbH. ISBN 3-8132-0713-7.
- Gröner, Erich; Jung, Dieter; Maass, Martin (1991). German Warships 1815–1945, U-boats and Mine Warfare Vessels. Vol. 2. Translated by Thomas, Keith; Magowan, Rachel. London: Conway Maritime Press. ISBN 0-85177-593-4.
- Rössler, Eberhard (1979). Die deutschen U-Boote und ihre Werften: eine Bilddokumentation über den deutschen U-Bootbau; in zwei Bänden (in German). Vol. I. Munich: Bernard & Graefe. ISBN 3-7637-5213-7.
- Bonsor, N. R. P. (1975) [1955]. North Atlantic Seaway: An Illustrated History of the Passenger Services Linking the Old World With the New (Enlarged and revised ed.). New York: Arco. OCLC 1891992.
- Drechsel, Edwin (1994). Norddeutscher Lloyd, Bremen, 1857–1970: History, Fleet, Ship Mails. Vancouver, British Columbia: Cordillera Pub. Co. ISBN 978-1-895590-08-1. OCLC 30357825.
- Gardiner, Robert; Gray, Randal, eds. (1985). Conway's All the World's Fighting Ships 1906–1921. Annapolis, Maryland: Naval Institute Press. ISBN 978-0-87021-907-8. OCLC 12119866.
- Gibson, R. H.; Maurice Prendergast (2003) [1931]. The German Submarine War, 1914–1918. Annapolis, Maryland: Naval Institute Press. ISBN 978-1-59114-314-7. OCLC 52924732.
- Halpern, Paul G. (1994). A Naval History of World War I. Annapolis, Maryland: Naval Institute Press. ISBN 978-0-87021-266-6. OCLC 28411665.
- Messimer, Dwight R. (2002). Verschollen: World War I U-boat losses. Annapolis, Maryland: Naval Institute Press. ISBN 978-1-55750-475-3. OCLC 231973419.
- Miller, David (2002). The Illustrated Directory of Submarines of the World. St. Paul, Minnesota: MBI Pub. Co. ISBN 978-0-7603-1345-9. OCLC 50208951.
- Tarrant, V. E. (1989). The U-Boat Offensive: 1914–1945. Annapolis, Maryland: Naval Institute Press. ISBN 978-0-87021-764-7. OCLC 20338385.
- Williamson, Gordon (2002). U-boats of the Kaiser's Navy. Oxford: Osprey. ISBN 978-1-84176-362-0. OCLC 48627495.
