= SM UB-38 =

Coordinates: 50°56′N 1°25′E

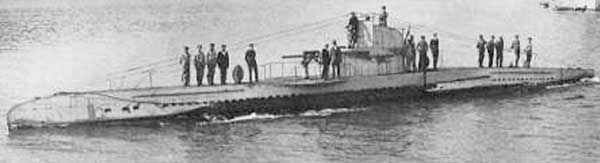
- SM UB-45 a U-boat similar to UB-38

History

German Empire
- Name: UB-38
- Ordered: 22 July 1915
- Builder: Blohm & Voss, Hamburg
- Cost: 1,152,000 German Papiermark
- Yard number: 262
- Launched: 1 April 1916
- Completed: 18 July 1916
- Commissioned: 19 July 1916
- Fate: Sunk by mine 8 February 1918

General characteristics
- Class & type: Type UB II submarine
- Displacement: 274 t (270 long tons) surfaced; 303 t (298 long tons) submerged
- Length: 36.90 m (121 ft 1 in) o/a; 27.90 m (91 ft 6 in) pressure hull
- Beam: 4.37 m (14 ft 4 in) o/a; 3.85 m (12 ft 8 in) pressure hull
- Draught: 3.69 m (12 ft 1 in)
- Propulsion: 1 × propeller shaft; 2 × 6-cylinder diesel engine, 284 PS (209 kW; 280 bhp); 2 × electric motor, 280 PS (210 kW; 280 shp)
- Speed: 9.15 knots (16.95 km/h; 10.53 mph) surfaced; 5.81 knots (10.76 km/h; 6.69 mph) submerged
- Range: 6,450 nmi (11,950 km; 7,420 mi) at 5 knots (9.3 km/h; 5.8 mph) surfaced; 45 nmi (83 km; 52 mi) at 4 knots (7.4 km/h; 4.6 mph) submerged
- Test depth: 50 m (160 ft)
- Complement: 2 officers, 21 men
- Armament: 2 × 50 cm (19.7 in) torpedo tubes; 4 × torpedoes (later 6); 1 × 8.8 cm (3.5 in) Uk L/30 deck gun
- Notes: 42-second diving time

Service record
- Part of: Flandern Flotilla; 11 September 1916 – 8 February 1918
- Commanders: Kptlt. Erwin Waßner; 10 September – 18 November 1916; Oblt.z.S. Wilhelm Amberger; 19 November 1916 – 5 December 1917; Oblt.z.S. Waldemar von Fischer; 6 – 24 December 1917; Oblt.z.S. Günther Bachmann; 25 December 1917 – 8 February 1918
- Operations: 21 patrols
- Victories: 47 merchant ships sunk (47,476 GRT); 1 merchant ship damaged (4,577 GRT)

SM UB-38 (Note: "SM" stands for "Seiner Majestät" (English: His Majesty's) and combined with the U for Unterseeboot would be translated as His Majesty's Submarine.) was a German Type UB II submarine or U-boat in the German Imperial Navy (German: Kaiserliche Marine) during World War I.

== Design ==
A Type UB II submarine, UB-38 had a displacement of 274 tonnes (270 long tons) when at the surface and 303 tonnes (298 long tons) while submerged. She had a total length of 36.90 m (121 ft 1 in), a beam of 4.37 m (14 ft 4 in), and a draught of 3.69 m (12 ft 1 in). The submarine was powered by two Körting six-cylinder diesel engines producing a total 284 metric horsepower (280 shp; 209 kW), two Siemens-Schuckert electric motors producing 280 metric horsepower (210 kW; 280 shp), and one propeller shaft. She was capable of operating at depths of up to 50 metres (160 ft).

The submarine had a maximum surface speed of 9.15 knots (16.95 km/h; 10.53 mph) and a maximum submerged speed of 5.81 knots (10.76 km/h; 6.69 mph). When submerged, she could operate for 45 nautical miles (83 km; 52 mi) at 4 knots (7.4 km/h; 4.6 mph); when surfaced, she could travel 6,450 nautical miles (11,950 km; 7,420 mi) at 5 knots (9.3 km/h; 5.8 mph). UB-38 was fitted with two 50 centimetres (20 in) torpedo tubes, four torpedoes, and one 8.8 cm (3.5 in) Uk L/30 deck gun. She had a complement of twenty-one crew members and two officers and a 42-second dive time.

== Construction and career ==
The U-boat was ordered on 22 July 1915 and launched on 1 April 1916. She was commissioned into the German Imperial Navy on 19 July 1916 as SM UB-38.

The submarine sank 47 ships in 21 patrols. UB-38 struck a mine and sank in the English Channel on 8 February 1918.

== Summary of raiding history ==
Date	Name	Nationality	Tonnage (Note: Tonnages are in gross register tons)	Fate
30 September 1916	Irma	France	844	Sunk
30 September 1916	Pearl	United Kingdom	144	Sunk
1 October 1916	Le Pelerin	France	31	Sunk
1 October 1916	Cap Mazagan	France	789	Sunk
1 October 1916	Le Blavet	France	1,010	Sunk
1 October 1916	Mallin	Norway	468	Sunk
1 October 1916	Musette	France	245	Sunk
3 October 1916	La Fraternite	France	477	Sunk
4 October 1916	Cantatrice	France	109	Sunk
5 October 1916	Cederic	Norway	1,129	Sunk
5 October 1916	Rosenvold	Norway	758	Sunk
13 November 1916	Bernicia	United Kingdom	957	Sunk
13 November 1916	Caterham	United Kingdom	1,912	Sunk
13 November 1916	Riquette	France	164	Sunk
13 November 1916	Saint Nicolas	France	261	Sunk
14 November 1916	Polpedn	United Kingdom	1,510	Sunk
14 November 1916	Professeur Jalaguier	France	223	Sunk
14 November 1916	Ullvang	Norway	639	Sunk
12 December 1916	Coath	United Kingdom	975	Sunk
12 December 1916	Conrad	United Kingdom	164	Sunk
15 December 1916	Naiad	United Kingdom	1,907	Sunk
17 December 1916	Ason	Spain	2,083	Sunk
19 December 1916	Ocean	France	339	Sunk
15 January 1917	Independent	France	153	Sunk
16 January 1917	Manuel	Spain	2,419	Sunk
18 January 1917	Asp	Norway	1,759	Sunk
19 January 1917	Lillian H.	United Kingdom	467	Sunk
11 February 1917	Dalmata	Norway	1,773	Sunk
11 April 1917	Precedent	United Kingdom	36	Sunk
12 April 1917	Lismore	United Kingdom	1,305	Sunk
13 April 1917	Maria	United Kingdom	175	Sunk
26 April 1917	Kong Oscar II	Norway	842	Sunk
27 April 1917	Jessie	United Kingdom	108	Sunk
1 May 1917	Ladywood	United Kingdom	2,314	Sunk
4 May 1917	Aghios Nikolaos	Greece	2,231	Sunk
4 May 1917	Assos	Greece	2,840	Sunk
4 May 1917	Joseph	United Kingdom	205	Sunk
24 May 1917	Gudrun	Norway	1,472	Sunk
24 May 1917	Thyra	Denmark	285	Sunk
20 August 1917	Claverley	United Kingdom	3,829	Sunk
26 August 1917	W. H. Dwyer	Canada	1,770	Sunk
15 September 1917	Dependence	United Kingdom	120	Sunk
21 September 1917	Aline Montreuil	France	1,624	Sunk
19 October 1917	Teespool	United Kingdom	4,577	Damaged
20 October 1917	Algarve	United Kingdom	1,274	Sunk
13 December 1917	Ottokar	United Kingdom	957	Sunk
5 January 1918	Birtley	United Kingdom	1,438	Sunk
3 February 1918	Lofoten	United Kingdom	942	Sunk

== Bibliography ==
- Bendert, Harald (2000). Die UB-Boote der Kaiserlichen Marine, 1914-1918. Einsätze, Erfolge, Schicksal (in German). Hamburg: Verlag E.S. Mittler & Sohn GmbH. ISBN 3-8132-0713-7.
- Gröner, Erich; Jung, Dieter; Maass, Martin (1991). U-boats and Mine Warfare Vessels. German Warships 1815–1945. Vol. 2. Translated by Thomas, Keith; Magowan, Rachel. London: Conway Maritime Press. ISBN 0-85177-593-4.
- Rössler, Eberhard (1979). Die deutschen U-Boote und ihre Werften: eine Bilddokumentation über den deutschen U-Bootbau; in zwei Bänden (in German). Vol. I. Munich: Bernard & Graefe. ISBN 3-7637-5213-7.
