= SS Huntsend =

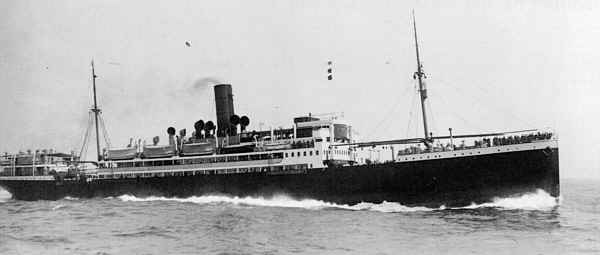

History

Germany
- Name: Lützow
- Namesake: Ludwig Adolf Wilhelm von Lützow
- Owner: Norddeutscher Lloyd
- Route: Bremerhaven to New York
- Builder: AG Weser
- Launched: 17 December 1907
- Maiden voyage: 11 April 1908
- Fate: Seized by the British in 1914, bought back in 1923, sold to Bremer Vulkan on 24 December 1932, and scrapped

History

United Kingdom
- Name: SS Huntsend
- Operator: Leyland Line
- Fate: Sold to back to Norddeutscher Lloyd

General characteristics
- Tonnage: 8,818 gross tons
- Length: 146.77 m (481 ft 6 in)
- Beam: 17.55 m (57 ft 7 in)
- Propulsion: 2 x quadruple expansion steam engines
- Speed: 15 knots (28 km/h; 17 mph)

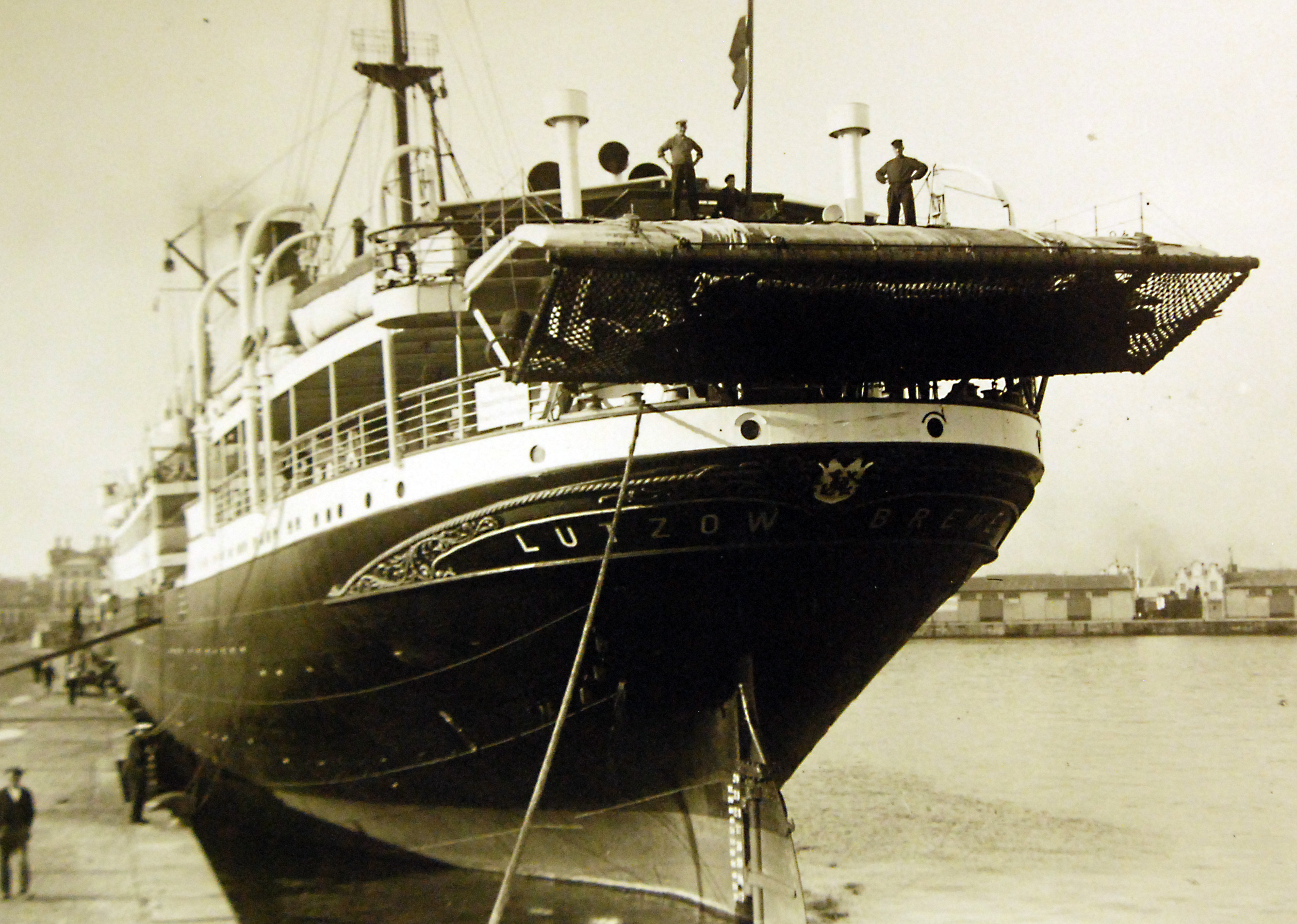
Stern of Lützow during tests launching seaplane with a drag sail trailing on the water, WWI

Lützow was the tenth ship of the German Feldherren-Klasse of passenger ships. She was launched in 1907, seized by the British in 1914, renamed to Huntsend, and eventually scrapped in 1932.

== German career ==
The ship's German career began with a maiden voyage from Bremerhaven to New York City on 11 April 1908.

== British career ==
On 3 August 1914, Lützow was seized by the British in the Suez Canal. She was put to use as a troopship under the name Huntsend, and was also used as a Hospital Ship evacuating troops from Gallipoli in 1915.

=== Torpedo attack ===
On 3 January 1917 near Crete, the Huntsend was damaged by a torpedo fired by the German U-boat SM UB-47. On 4 January at 11:15 am, HMS Pelorus reported receiving 5 military officers and 6 mercantile ratings who were survivors from the Huntsend, which had been towed to port.

In April 1917, the Wallsend Slipway & Engineering Company reported that the damaged ship was in a dry dock in Tyne and Wear, England.

=== Influenza outbreak ===
During the 1918 flu pandemic, the Huntsend departed Montreal on 26 September 1918 with 649 Canadian soldiers on board. Before the ship had left port, the ship's doctor had reported concerns about 15 of the passengers who were already sick with influenza and pneumonia. Despite his reported concerns, the ship sailed, and five percent of the 649 Canadians died before the ship disembarked on 11 October 1918. Some, if not all, of these men were buried at Beaumont-Hamel Newfoundland Memorial a memorial site in France. Some of those infected died at a later date.

== Return to Germany ==
In 1923, Norddeutscher Lloyd bought the ship back and returned her to passenger services.
