= SM UB-21 =

Coordinates: 50°44′28″N 1°01′6″W

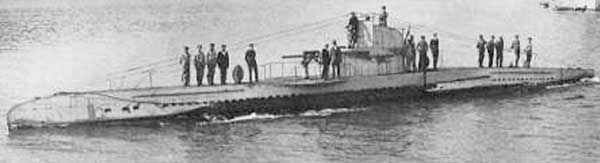
- SM UB-45, a U-boat similar to UB-21

History

German Empire
- Name: UB-21
- Ordered: 30 April 1915
- Builder: Blohm & Voss, Hamburg
- Yard number: 251
- Launched: 26 September 1915
- Completed: 18 February 1916
- Commissioned: 20 February 1916
- Fate: Sunk as target 30 September 1920

General characteristics
- Class & type: Type UB II submarine
- Displacement: 263 t (259 long tons) surfaced; 292 t (287 long tons) submerged
- Length: 36.13 m (118 ft 6 in) o/a; 27.13 m (89 ft) pressure hull
- Beam: 4.36 m (14 ft 4 in) o/a; 3.85 m (13 ft) pressure hull
- Draught: 3.70 m (12 ft 2 in)
- Propulsion: 1 × propeller shaft; 2 × 6-cylinder diesel engine, 284 PS (209 kW; 280 bhp); 2 × electric motor, 280 PS (210 kW; 280 shp)
- Speed: 9.15 knots (16.95 km/h; 10.53 mph) surfaced; 5.81 knots (10.76 km/h; 6.69 mph) submerged
- Range: 6,450 nmi (11,950 km; 7,420 mi) at 5 knots (9.3 km/h; 5.8 mph) surfaced; 45 nmi (83 km; 52 mi) at 4 knots (7.4 km/h; 4.6 mph) submerged
- Test depth: 50 m (160 ft)
- Complement: 2 officers, 21 men
- Armament: 2 × 50 cm (19.7 in) torpedo tubes; 4 × torpedoes (later 6); 1 × 5 cm SK L/40 gun
- Notes: 45-second diving time

Service record
- Part of: I Flotilla; 14 April 1916 – 1 February 1917; II Flotilla; 1 February – 10 September 1917; V Flotilla; 10 September 1917 – 29 April 1918; I Flotilla; 29 April – 7 October 1918; Training Flotilla; 7 October – 11 November 1918
- Commanders: Kptlt. Ernst Hashagen; 20 February – 26 November 1916; Oblt.z.S. Franz Walther; 27 November 1916 – 9 September 1917; Oblt.z.S. Walter Scheffler; 10 September 1917 – 28 April 1918; Oblt.z.S. Bruno Mahn; 29 April – 7 October 1918
- Operations: 26 patrols
- Victories: 33 merchant ships sunk (36,764 GRT); 1 merchant ship damaged (3,734 GRT); 4 merchant ships taken as prize (2,722 GRT)

SM UB-21 (Note: "SM" stands for "Seiner Majestät" (English: His Majesty's) and combined with the U for Unterseeboot would be translated as His Majesty's Submarine.) was a German Type UB II submarine or U-boat in the Imperial German Navy (German: Kaiserliche Marine) during World War I. The U-boat was ordered on 30 April 1915 and launched on 26 September 1915. She was commissioned into the German Imperial Navy on 20 February 1916 as SM UB-21. The submarine sank 33 ships in 26 patrols for a total of 36,764 gross register tons (GRT). Surrendered to Britain in accordance with the requirements of the Armistice with Germany, UB-21 was sunk as a target by HMS Terror in the Solent on 30 September 1920; the wreck was sold in 1970 and most had been cleared by 1998, although some remnants survive.

== Design ==
A Type UB II submarine, UB-21 had a displacement of 263 tonnes (259 long tons) when at the surface and 292 tonnes (287 long tons) while submerged. She had a total length of 36.13 m (118 ft 6 in), a beam of 4.36 m (14 ft 4 in), and a draught of 3.70 m (12 ft 2 in). The submarine was powered by two Körting six-cylinder, four-stroke diesel engines producing a total of 280 metric horsepower (280 shp; 210 kW), two Siemens-Schuckert electric motors producing 280 metric horsepower (210 kW; 280 shp), and one propeller shaft. She was capable of operating at depths of up to 50 metres (160 ft).

The submarine had a maximum surface speed of 9.15 knots (16.95 km/h; 10.53 mph) and a maximum submerged speed of 5.81 knots (10.76 km/h; 6.69 mph). When submerged, she could operate for 45 nautical miles (83 km; 52 mi) at 4 knots (7.4 km/h; 4.6 mph); when surfaced, she could travel 6,650 nautical miles (12,320 km; 7,650 mi) at 5 knots (9.3 km/h; 5.8 mph). UB-21 was fitted with two 50 centimetres (20 in) torpedo tubes, four torpedoes, and one 5 cm (2.0 in) SK L/40 deck gun. She had a complement of twenty-one crew members and two officers and a 45-second dive time.

== Summary of raiding history ==
Date	Name	Nationality	Tonnage (Note: Tonnages are in gross register tons)	Fate
5 May 1916	Harald	Sweden	275	Sunk
20 October 1916	Lekna	Sweden	204	Sunk
20 October 1916	Randi	Norway	467	Sunk
20 October 1916	Svartvik	Sweden	322	Sunk
21 October 1916	Fritzöe	Norway	641	Captured as prize
21 October 1916	Grönhaug	Norway	667	Sunk
22 October 1916	London	Denmark	184	Sunk
22 October 1916	Thor	Norway	372	Sunk
3 November 1916	Pluto	Norway	1,148	Captured as prize
16 February 1917	Lady Ann	United Kingdom	1,016	Sunk
17 February 1917	Excel	United Kingdom	157	Sunk
22 February 1917	John Miles	United Kingdom	687	Sunk
29 March 1917	Bywell	United Kingdom	1,522	Sunk
31 March 1917	Norden	Norway	776	Captured as prize
29 April 1917	Victoria	United Kingdom	1,620	Sunk
2 May 1917	Rikard Noordrak	Norway	1,123	Sunk
5 May 1917	Edith Cavell	United Kingdom	20	Sunk
6 May 1917	Harold	Sweden	1,679	Sunk
8 May 1917	Batavier II	Netherlands	157	Captured as prize
6 June 1917	S.N.A. 2	France	2,294	Sunk
7 June 1917	Sir Francis	United Kingdom	1,991	Sunk
21 July 1917	Trelyon	United Kingdom	3,099	Sunk
22 July 1917	Glow	United Kingdom	1,141	Sunk
23 July 1917	Vanland	Sweden	1,285	Sunk
24 August 1917	Springhill	United Kingdom	1,507	Sunk
18 October 1917	Amsteldam	United Kingdom	1,233	Sunk
19 October 1917	Gemma	United Kingdom	1,385	Sunk
23 November 1917	Ocean	United Kingdom	1,442	Sunk
29 December 1917	Inverness	United Kingdom	3,734	Damaged
29 December 1917	Patria	Russian Empire	838	Sunk
30 December 1917	Hercules	United Kingdom	1,295	Sunk
25 March 1918	Hercules	United Kingdom	1,095	Sunk
8 May 1918	Constantia	United Kingdom	772	Sunk
10 May 1918	Anboto Mendi	Spain	2,114	Sunk
11 May 1918	Gothia	Sweden	1,826	Sunk
12 May 1918	Haslingden	United Kingdom	1,934	Sunk
4 July 1918	Mentor	Norway	539	Sunk
26 September 1918	Paul	Belgium	659	Sunk

== Bibliography ==
- Bendert, Harald (2000). Die UB-Boote der Kaiserlichen Marine, 1914-1918. Einsätze, Erfolge, Schicksal (in German). Hamburg: Verlag E.S. Mittler & Sohn GmbH. ISBN 3-8132-0713-7.
- Gröner, Erich; Jung, Dieter; Maass, Martin (1991). U-boats and Mine Warfare Vessels. German Warships 1815–1945. Vol. 2. Translated by Thomas, Keith; Magowan, Rachel. London: Conway Maritime Press. ISBN 0-85177-593-4.
- Rössler, Eberhard (1979). Die deutschen U-Boote und ihre Werften: eine Bilddokumentation über den deutschen U-Bootbau; in zwei Bänden (in German). Vol. I. Munich: Bernard & Graefe. ISBN 3-7637-5213-7.
