= HMS Highlander =

Two ships of the Royal Navy have been named HMS Highlander :

- HMS Highlander (1856) an Albacore-class gunboat launched in 1856 and sold in 1884
- HMS Highlander (H44) a G and H-class destroyer laid down as the Brazilian Jaguaribe. She was purchased for the Royal Navy in 1939 and renamed before her launching in 1940. She was sold for scrap in 1946
