= SM U-51 =

Coordinates: 53°56′N 7°55′E

History

German Empire
- Name: U-51
- Ordered: 23 August 1914
- Builder: Germaniawerft, Kiel
- Yard number: 233
- Laid down: 19 December 1914
- Launched: 25 November 1915
- Commissioned: 24 February 1916
- Fate: Sunk on 14 July 1916

General characteristics
- Class & type: Type U 51 submarine
- Displacement: 715 t (704 long tons) surfaced; 902 t (888 long tons) submerged
- Length: 65.20 m (213 ft 11 in) (o/a); 52.51 m (172 ft 3 in) (pressure hull)
- Beam: 6.44 m (21 ft 2 in) (oa); 4.18 m (13 ft 9 in) (pressure hull)
- Height: 7.82 m (25 ft 8 in)
- Draught: 3.64 m (11 ft 11 in)
- Installed power: 2 × 2,400 PS (1,765 kW; 2,367 shp) surfaced; 2 × 1,200 PS (883 kW; 1,184 shp) submerged
- Propulsion: 2 shafts
- Speed: 17.1 knots (31.7 km/h; 19.7 mph) surfaced; 9.1 knots (16.9 km/h; 10.5 mph) submerged
- Range: 9,400 nmi (17,400 km; 10,800 mi) at 8 knots (15 km/h; 9.2 mph) surfaced; 55 nmi (102 km; 63 mi) at 5 knots (9.3 km/h; 5.8 mph) submerged
- Test depth: 50 m (164 ft 1 in)
- Complement: 36
- Armament: 4 × 50 cm (19.7 in) torpedo tubes (two bow, two stern); 7 torpedoes; 2 × 8.8 cm (3.5 in) SK L/30 deck guns

Service record
- Part of: I Flotilla; Unknown start – 25 May 1916; II Flotilla; 25 May – 14 July 1916
- Commanders: Kptlt. Walter Rumpel; 19 February – 14 July 1916
- Operations: 1 patrol
- Victories: None

SM U-51 (Note: "SM" stands for "Seiner Majestät" (English: His Majesty's) and combined with the U for Unterseeboot would be translated as His Majesty's Submarine.) was a Type U 51 submarine, one of 329 submarines in the Imperial German Navy in World War I. She engaged in commerce warfare during the First Battle of the Atlantic.

She was ordered from Germaniawerft, at Kiel, on 23 August 1914 and laid down there on 19 December. She was launched on 25 November 1915 and commissioned on 24 February 1916. Kapitänleutnant Walter Rumpel was her captain for her entire career.

== Operations ==
Completed at Kiel about March 1916, she carried out trials at Kiel School until the end of April when she proceeded to Heligoland. British Naval Intelligence (better known as Room 40): monitored and recorded her activities. She was attached to the 2nd Half Flotilla and carried out a patrol in the North Sea between 2 May and 6 May 1916, traveling to Hanstholm in company with SM U-70, escorted by two Zeppelins. She was again in the North Sea between 16 May and 3 June 1916, during the Battle of Jutland. She fired two torpedoes at the British battleship HMS Warspite, but missed her.

On 14 July the British submarine HMS H5 spotted U-51 leaving the Ems and torpedoed her. U-51 sank with the loss of 34 of her crew; four survivors were rescued.

The wreck of U-51 was raised and broken up in 1968.

== Bibliography ==
- Gröner, Erich; Jung, Dieter; Maass, Martin (1991). German Warships 1815–1945, U-boats and Mine Warfare Vessels. Vol. 2. Translated by Thomas, Keith; Magowan, Rachel. London: Conway Maritime Press. ISBN 0-85177-593-4.
