= Small nucleolar RNA SNORD51 =

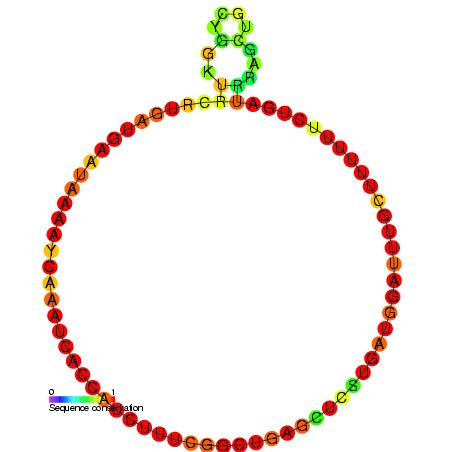
- Predicted secondary structure and sequence conservation of SNORD51

Identifiers
- Symbol: SNORD51
- Alt. Symbols: U51
- Rfam: RF00280

Other data
- RNA type: Gene; snRNA; snoRNA; C/D-box
- Domain: Eukaryota
- GO: GO:0006396 GO:0005730
- SO: SO:0000593
- PDB structures: PDBe

In molecular biology, SNORD51 (also known as U51) is a non-coding RNA (ncRNA) molecule which functions in the modification of other small nuclear RNAs (snRNAs). This type of modifying RNA is usually located in the nucleolus of the eukaryotic cell which is a major site of snRNA biogenesis. It is known as a small nucleolar RNA (snoRNA) and also often referred to as a guide RNA.

U51 belongs to the C/D box class of snoRNAs which contain the conserved sequence motifs known as the C box (UGAUGA) and the D box (CUGA). Most of the members of the box C/D family function in directing site-specific 2'-O-methylation of substrate RNAs.

This snoRNA was originally cloned from HeLa cells and expression verified by northern blotting. It is predicted to guide 2'O-ribose methylation of ribosomal RNA (rRNA) 28S residue A1511. In the human genome it is located in the introns of the same gene as the H/ACA box snoRNA ACA41.
