= SM U-56 =

One of the 329 WWI-era submarines of the Imperial German Navy

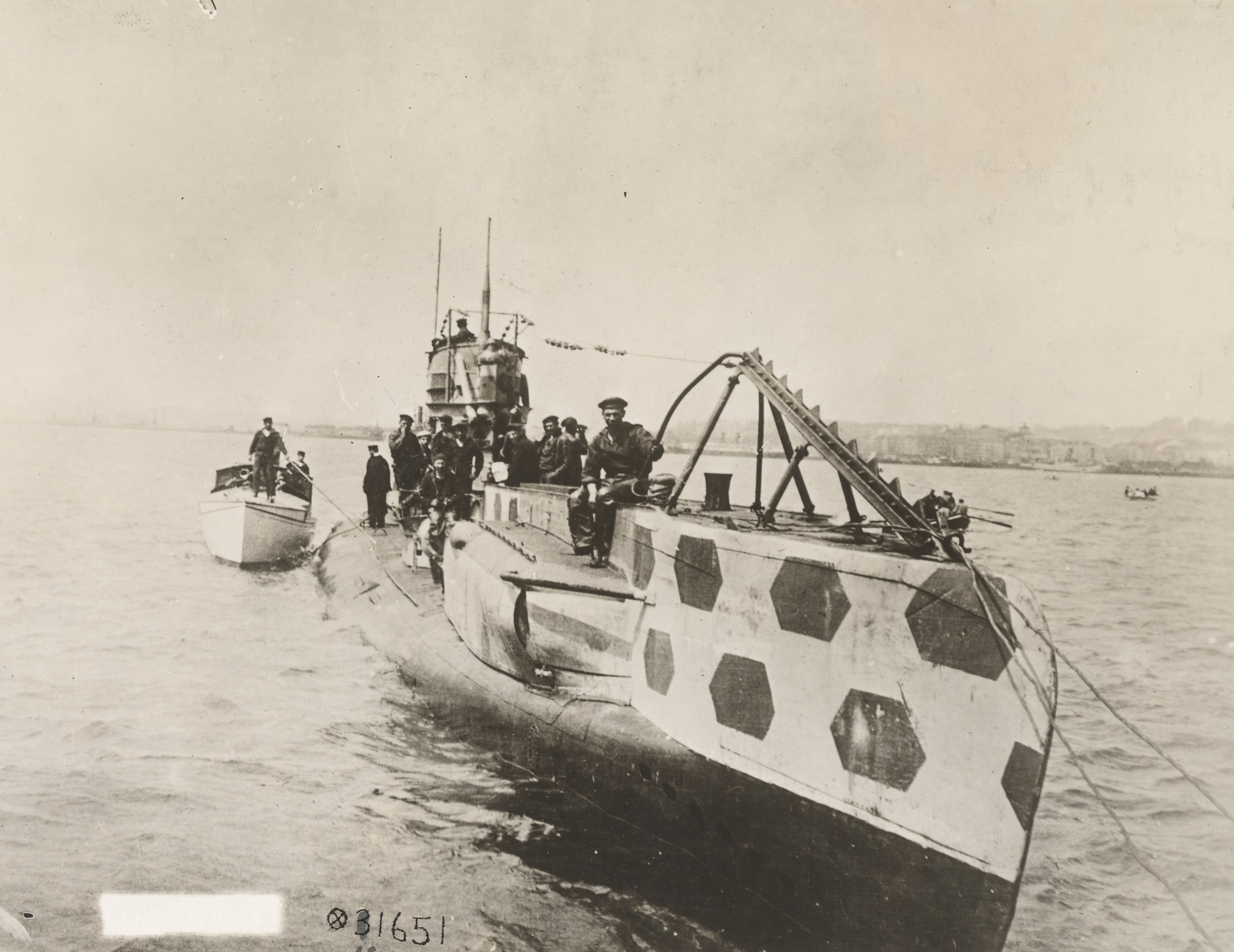
- U-56 arriving in a spanish port

History

German Empire
- Name: U-56
- Ordered: 23 August 1914
- Builder: Germaniawerft, Kiel
- Yard number: 238
- Laid down: 28 December 1914
- Launched: 18 April 1916
- Commissioned: 23 June 1916
- Fate: Missing since 3 November 1916. 35 dead (all hands lost)

General characteristics
- Class & type: Type U 51 submarine
- Displacement: 715 t (704 long tons) surfaced; 902 t (888 long tons) submerged
- Length: 65.20 m (213 ft 11 in) (o/a); 52.51 m (172 ft 3 in) (pressure hull)
- Beam: 6.44 m (21 ft 2 in) (oa); 4.18 m (13 ft 9 in) (pressure hull)
- Height: 7.82 m (25 ft 8 in)
- Draught: 3.64 m (11 ft 11 in)
- Installed power: 2 × 2,400 PS (1,765 kW; 2,367 shp) surfaced; 2 × 1,200 PS (883 kW; 1,184 shp) submerged
- Propulsion: 2 shafts
- Speed: 17.1 knots (31.7 km/h; 19.7 mph) surfaced; 9.1 knots (16.9 km/h; 10.5 mph) submerged
- Range: 9,400 nmi (17,400 km; 10,800 mi) at 8 knots (15 km/h; 9.2 mph) surfaced; 55 nmi (102 km; 63 mi) at 5 knots (9.3 km/h; 5.8 mph) submerged
- Test depth: 50 m (164 ft 1 in)
- Complement: 36
- Armament: 4 × 50 cm (19.7 in) torpedo tubes (two bow, two stern); 7 torpedoes; 2 × 8.8 cm (3.5 in) SK L/30 deck guns

Service record
- Part of: II Flotilla; 18 June – 3 November 1916
- Commanders: Kptlt. Hermann Lorenz; 24 February – 3 November 1916
- Operations: 1 patrol
- Victories: 5 merchant ships sunk (5,701 GRT)

SM U-56 (Note: "SM" stands for "Seiner Majestät" (English: His Majesty's) and combined with the U for Unterseeboot would be translated as His Majesty's Submarine.) was one of the 329 submarines serving in the Imperial German Navy in World War I. U-56 was engaged in the naval warfare and took part in the First Battle of the Atlantic.

On 2 November 1916, U-56 was attacked by gunfire from the Imperial Russian Navy destroyer Grozovoi off Khorne Island, Norway (near Vardø). U-56 survived this attack. U-56 dropped off the crew of the Norwegian merchant ship Ivanhoe ashore at 07:45 on 3 November 1916 at Lodsvik. The Norwegian sailors were aboard the ship during the action of the previous day and their description matches with the Russian account.

After this, U-56 was never heard from again and was declared missing.

== Summary of raiding history ==
| Date | Name | Nationality | Tonnage (Note: Tonnages are in gross register tons) | Fate |
|---|---|---|---|---|
| 22 October 1916 | Theodosi Tschernigowski | Russia | 327 | Sunk |
| 23 October 1916 | Rensfjell | Norway | 781 | Sunk |
| 25 October 1916 | Dag | Norway | 963 | Sunk |
| 26 October 1916 | Oola | United Kingdom | 2,494 | Sunk |
| 1 November 1916 | Ivanhoe | Norway | 1,136 | Sunk |

== Bibliography ==
- Gröner, Erich; Jung, Dieter; Maass, Martin (1991). U-boats and Mine Warfare Vessels. German Warships 1815–1945. Vol. 2. Translated by Thomas, Keith; Magowan, Rachel. London: Conway Maritime Press. ISBN 0-85177-593-4.
