= Triagoz Lighthouse =

Lighthouse in Côtes-d'Armor, France

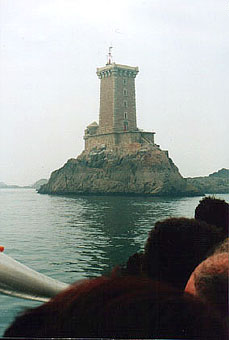
- Location: Perros-Guirec, Côtes-d'Armor, France
- Coordinates: 48°52′17″N 3°38′47″W

Tower
- Constructed: 1864
- Construction: granite tower
- Automated: 1984
- Height: 49 feet (15 m)
- Shape: square tower with balcony
- Markings: unpainted tower
- Heritage: classified historical monument

Light
- Focal height: 95 feet (29 m)
- Characteristic: Fl (2) W R 6s. (339°-010°)
- France no.: FR-0589

The Triagoz Lighthouse is a lighthouse in Côtes-d'Armor, France, located on the Guen-Arms rock of the Triagoz archipelago. The lighthouse is closed to the public. It is a listed monument since 2017.

The structure is a square tower, composed of pink granite from Ploumanac'h, with a semicircular projection towards the coast.

== History ==
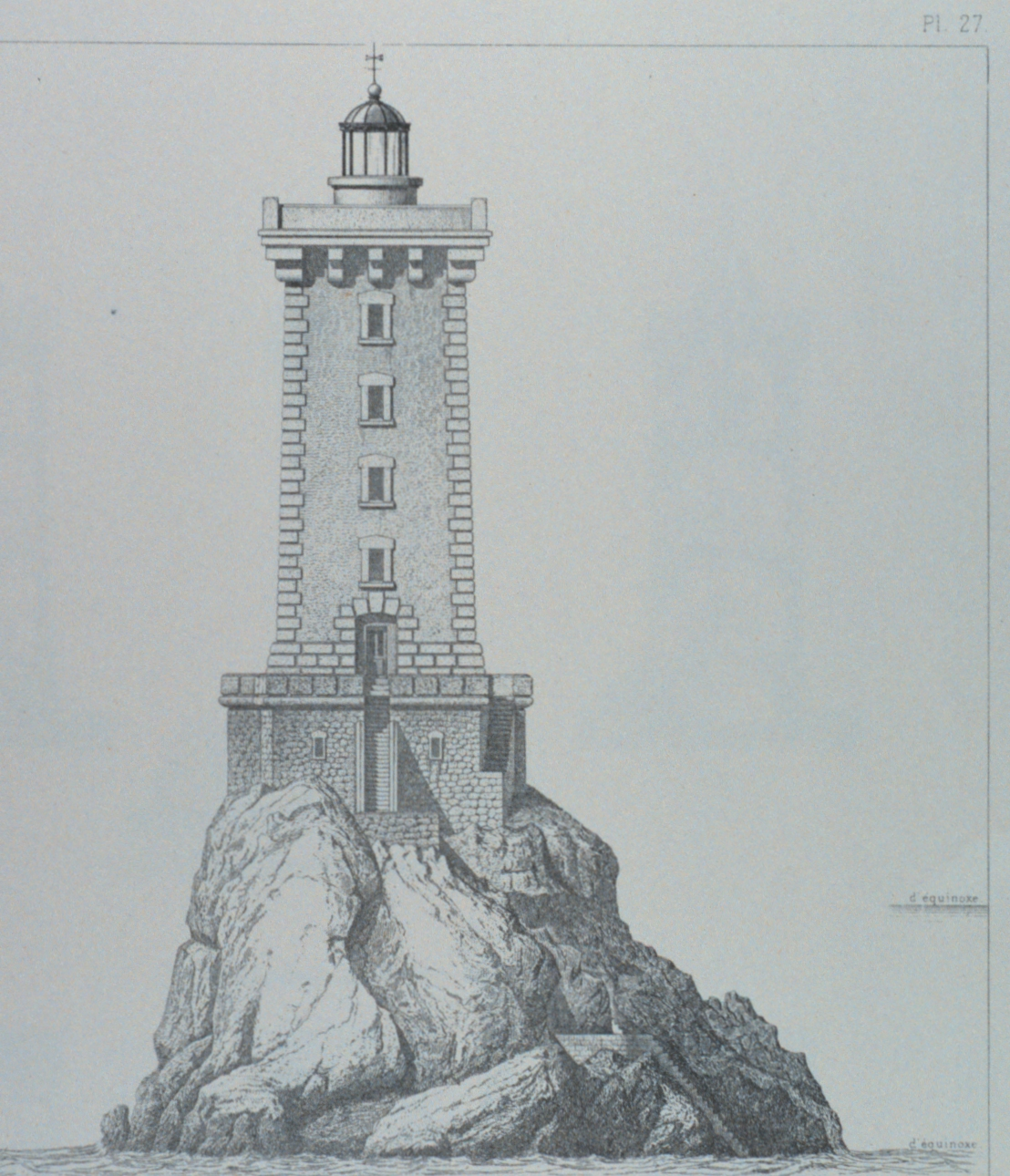
Plan of the lighthouse

The Triagoz lighthouse was built by the engineers Dujardin and Pelau between 1861 and 1864.

It was automated in 1984.

The lantern has been removed and resides in a courtyard in Lézardrieux.

Due to a current lack of adequate maintenance and a lack of credit, the lighthouse is deteriorating at an alarming rate and requires a complete overhaul.

== See also ==
- List of lighthouses in France
