= HDMS Dykkeren =

20th century Danish submarine

History

Royal Danish Navy
- Name: Dykkeren
- Builder: FIAT San Giorgio
- Launched: 18 July 1909
- Commissioned: 29 September 1909
- Decommissioned: 13 June 1917
- Fate: Scrapped in 1917

General characteristics
- Displacement: 105 t (103 long tons), surfaced; 132 t (130 long tons), submerged
- Length: 34.65 m (113 ft 8 in)
- Beam: 3.5 m (11 ft 6 in)
- Draught: 2.2 m (7 ft 3 in)
- Speed: 12 knots (22 km/h; 14 mph), surfaced; 7.5 knots (13.9 km/h; 8.6 mph), submerged
- Range: c. 100 nmi (190 km; 120 mi)
- Complement: 12
- Armament: 2 × torpedo tubes

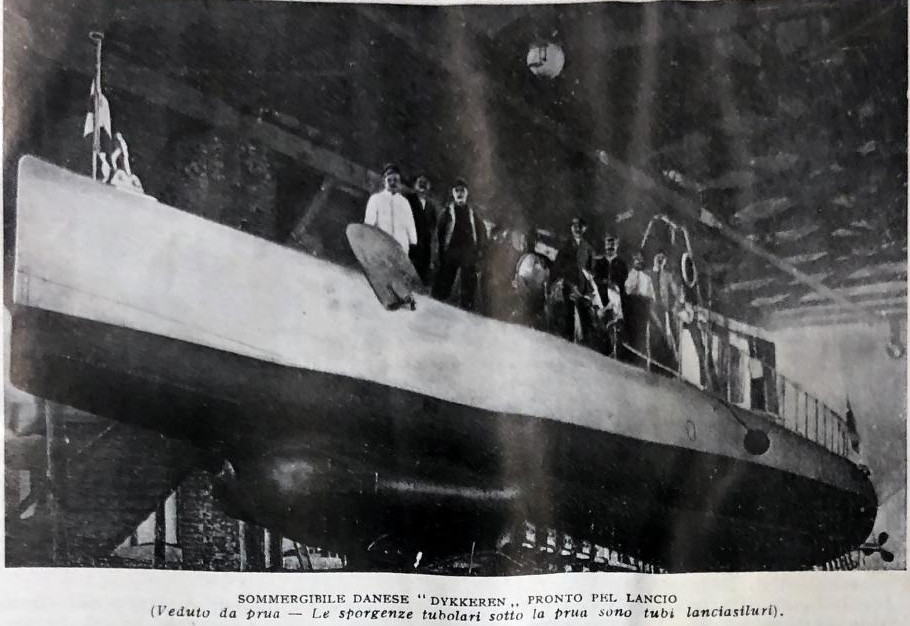
Dykkeren before launch

HDMS Dykkeren was the first Danish submarine built by FIAT San Giorgio for the Royal Danish Navy and commissioned in 1909. In 1910, Dykkeren was equipped with radiotelegraphy equipment, thereby becoming one of the first submarines in the world to have this. In 1916, Dykkeren collided with a ship, causing the submarine to sink, everyone apart from the chief, First Lieutenant Christensen, is saved.

== Bibliography ==
- Ubåden DYKKEREN. Byggekontrakt 1908: Contract for the building and delivery of a submarine torpedo-boat for the Royal Danish Marine Ministry. 1908.
