= SS Saturn (1904) =

Freighter ship during WW2

History
- Name: Saturn
- Owner: Palatine Shipping Co. (1904–1906); Watson Steamship Co. (1906–1912); Det Bergenske Dampskibsselskab (1912–1916)
- Port of registry: (United Kingdom) Manchester, England; Bergen, Norway
- Builder: Anderson Rodger and Company, Port Glasgow, Scotland
- Launched: 4 February 1904
- Completed: 26 February 1904
- Identification: Official number: 119583
- Fate: Scuttled by submarine, 31 October 1916

General characteristics
- Type: Freighter
- Tonnage: 981 gross register tons (GRT); 598 net register tons (NRT)
- Length: 230.2 ft (70.2 m)
- Beam: 34 ft (10.4 m)
- Draught: 14.3 ft (4.4 m)
- Installed power: 140 nhp
- Propulsion: 1 screw propeller; 1 triple-expansion steam engine
- Speed: 10 knots (19 km/h; 12 mph)

SS Saturn was a small freighter built before the First World War. Completed in 1906, she was intended for the West African trade. The ship was captured and scuttled by the German submarine SM U-57 in October 1916.

== Description ==
Saturn had an overall length of 230.2 feet (70.2 m), with a beam of 34 feet (10.4 m) and a draught of 14.3 feet (4.4 m). The ship was assessed at 981 gross register tons (GRT) and 598 net register tons (NRT). She had a vertical triple-expansion steam engine driving a single screw propeller. The engine was rated 140 nominal horsepower that gave her a maximum speed of 10 knots (19 km/h; 12 mph).

== Construction and career ==
Saturn was laid down as yard number 377 by Anderson Rodger and Company at its shipyard in Port Glasgow, Scotland, for the Palatine Shipping Co. as Thirlmere. Named after Thirlmere, the ship was launched on 4 February 1904 and completed on the 26th. She was transferred to the Watson Steamship Co. on 30 October 1906 before Palatine was wound down in early 1907. Thirlmere was sold to Det Bergenske Dampskibsselkab of Bergen, Norway, and renamed Saturn on 6 February 1912. She was enroute to Narvik, Norway, from Liverpool, with a cargo of cotton when she was shelled, captured and scuttled by U-57 about 35 nautical miles (65 km; 40 mi) north of the Shetland Islands at coordinates 60.04°N 05.07°W on 31 October 1916.

== Bibliography ==
- Fenton, Roy (December 2022). "Levers' Early Shipping Ventures: Bromport Steamship Co., Ltd. and its Predecessors". Marine News Supplement. 76 (12): S340 – S352. ISSN 0966-6958.
