= Type U 51 submarine =

German World War I submarine class

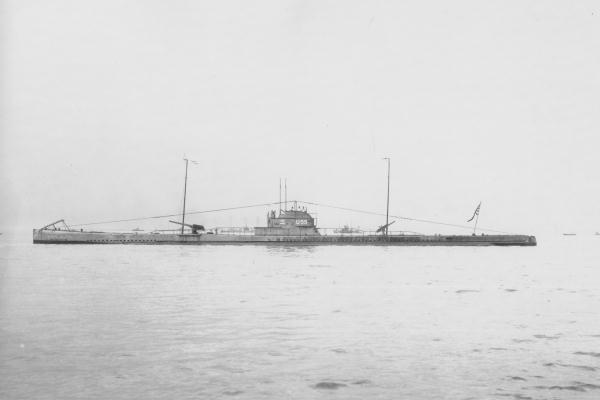
- SM U-55, a Type U 51 class U-boat

Class overview
- Builders: Germaniawerft, Kiel
- Operators: Imperial German Navy
- Preceded by: Type U 43
- Succeeded by: Type U 57
- Completed: 6
- Lost: 2

General characteristics
- Displacement: 715 t (704 long tons) surfaced; 902 t (888 long tons) submerged
- Length: 65.20 m (213 ft 11 in) (o/a); 52.51 m (172 ft 3 in) (pressure hull)
- Beam: 6.44 m (21 ft 2 in) (oa); 4.18 m (13 ft 9 in) (pressure hull)
- Height: 7.82 m (25 ft 8 in)
- Draught: 3.64 m (11 ft 11 in)
- Installed power: 2 × 2,400 PS (1,765 kW; 2,367 shp) surfaced; 2 × 1,200 PS (883 kW; 1,184 shp) submerged
- Propulsion: 2 shafts
- Speed: 17.1 knots (31.7 km/h; 19.7 mph) surfaced; 9.1 knots (16.9 km/h; 10.5 mph) submerged
- Range: 9,400 nmi (17,400 km; 10,800 mi) at 8 knots (15 km/h; 9.2 mph) surfaced; 55 nmi (102 km; 63 mi) at 5 knots (9.3 km/h; 5.8 mph) submerged
- Complement: 36
- Armament: 4 × 50 cm (19.7 in) torpedo tubes (two bow, two stern); 7 torpedoes; 2 × 8.8 cm (3.5 in) SK L/30 deck guns

Type U 51 was a class of U-boats built during World War I by the Kaiserliche Marine. Six Type U 51 were ordered at the beginning of the war and these were commissioned in 1916. Two were lost during the war and the remaining four surrendered to the Allies and were scrapped.

== Design ==
When World War I broke out on 28 July 1914, the German Navy initiated an emergency war building program, the so-called mobilisation program. This Mobilisation called for the immediate construction of seventeen U-boats by the two submarine building shipyard in Germany: the Germaniawerft in Kiel and the Kaiserliche Werft Danzig. The Kaiserliche Werft received an order for five Type U 43 U-boats and the Germaniawerft would have received an order for the remaining twelve U-boats, but since this yard experienced serious delays in the delivery of the previous order of eleven Type U 31 U-boats, only six Type U 51 U-boats were ordered on 23 August 1914 and the remaining six were ordered from a new yard AG Weser.

The previous two types of diesel engine U-boats produced by the Germaniawerft, the Type U 23 and Type U 31 had two-stroke diesel engines produced by the same shipyard, but since these engines were not sufficient reliable, four-stroke MAN diesel engines were to be installed. Delivery of these U-boats was expected between December 1915 and December 1916.

== Characteristics ==
Type U 51s had an overall length of 65.20 m (213 ft 11 in) The boats' beam was 6.44 m (21 ft 2 in), the draught was 3.64 m (11 ft 11 in), with a total height of 7.82 m (25 ft 8 in). The pressure hull had a length of 52.51 m (172 ft 3 in) and had a diameter of 4.18 m (13 ft 9 in). The boats displaced 715 tonnes (704 long tons) when surfaced and 902 t (888 long tons) when submerged.

Type U 51s were fitted with two MAN six-cylinder four-stroke S6V45/42 diesel engines with a total of 2,400 metric horsepower (1,765 kW; 2,367 bhp) for use on the surface and two Siemens-Schuckert double-acting electric motors with a total of 880 kW (1,196 PS; 1,180 shp) for underwater use. These engines powered two shafts, which gave the boats a top surface speed of 17.1 knots (31.7 km/h; 19.7 mph), and 9.1 knots (16.9 km/h; 10.5 mph) when submerged. Cruising range was 9,400 nautical miles (17,400 km; 10,800 mi) at 8 knots (15 km/h; 9.2 mph) on the surface and 55 nautical miles (102 km; 63 mi) at 5 knots (9.3 km/h; 5.8 mph) submerged. Constructional diving depth (Note: Constructional diving depth had a safety factor of 2.5, which meant that crushing depth was 2.5 times construction diving depth.) was 50 m (164 ft 1 in).

The U-boats were armed with four 50 cm (20 in) torpedo tubes, two fitted in the bow and two in the stern, and carried seven torpedoes. Most boats received initially one or two 8.8 cm (3.5 in) SK L/30 deck guns. Some boats had their sole deck gun replaced with a 10.5 cm (4.1 in) SK L/45 gun. The boats' complement was four officers and thirty-two enlisted men.

== Ships ==
Name	Launched	Commissioned	Merchant ships sunk (nbr / GRT )	Fate
U-51	25 November 1915	24 February 1916	none	Lost on 14 July 1916 in the Ems estuary
U-52	8 December 1915	16 March 1916	28 / 71.225	Surrendered on 21 November 1918 and scrapped at Swansea in 1922
U-53	1 February 1916	22 April 1916	83 / 217.508	Surrendered on 31 December 1918 and scrapped at Swansea in 1922
U-54	22 February 1916	25 May 1916	26 / 68.228	Surrendered on 24 November 1918 and scrapped at Taranto in 1919
U-55	18 March 1916	8 June 1916	61 / 129.352	Surrendered on 26 November 1918 and scrapped at Sasebo in 1922
U-56	18 April 1916	23 June 1916	4 / 5.374	Missing in the Arctic Ocean after 2 November 1916

== Bibliography ==
- Gröner, Erich; Jung, Dieter; Maass, Martin (1991). German Warships 1815–1945, U-boats and Mine Warfare Vessels. Vol. 2. Translated by Thomas, Keith; Magowan, Rachel. London: Conway Maritime Press. ISBN 0-85177-593-4.
- Herzog, Bodo (1993). Deutsche U-Boote : 1906 - 1966 [German U-boats : 1906 - 1966] (in German). Erlangen: Müller. ISBN 9783860700365.
- Möller, Eberhard; Brack, Werner (2004). The Encyclopedia of U-Boats. London: Chatham. ISBN 1-85367-623-3.
- Rössler, Eberhard (1981). The U-boat: The evolution and technical history of German submarines. London: Cassell & Co. ISBN 0-304-36120-8.
