= U39 =

U39 may refer to:

- German submarine U-39, various vessels
- HMS Hind (U39), a sloop of the Royal Navy
- Small nucleolar RNA SNORD39
- Small rhombidodecahedron
