= Constantinople Flotilla =

- Active: May 1915 - October 1918
- Country: German Empire
- Branch: Imperial German Navy
- Type: Attack submarine
- Role: Blockade; Commerce raiding
- Size: Flotilla
- Base: Constantinople

Commanders
- Notable commanders: Kapitänleutnant Adam

The Constantinople Flotilla (German: U-Flottille Konstantinopel) was an Imperial German Navy formation set up during World War I to execute the U-boat campaign against Allied shipping in the Mediterranean and the Black Sea in support of Germany's ally, the Ottoman Empire. Despite its official name, the U-Boote der Mittelmeerdivision in Konstantinopel ("U-boats of the Mediterranean Division in Constantinople"), it saw little service in the Mediterranean, operating mostly against Russian shipping in the Black Sea.

The flotilla based at Constantinople (formally renamed Istanbul in 1930) had a maximum strength of eleven U–boats but, due to the unfavorable conditions for commerce raiding in the Black Sea, saw little success during its three years of operations; the force sinking ships totaling 117,093 gross register tons.

Fifteen U-boats served in the Constantinople Flotilla; seven were lost on operations: five in the Black Sea and two in the Mediterranean. One U-boat was sold to Bulgaria. Two more U-boats were assigned to the Flotilla but were lost en route.

In 1917 the force was amalgamated with the Pola Flotilla based near what is now Pula, Croatia, coming under the command of the Führer der U-boote im Mittelmeer ("U-boat Leader, Mediterranean") there and was renamed U-Halbflotille Konstantinopel ("Constantinople Half-Flotilla").

In 1918, with the collapse of the Central Powers, the U-boats were scuttled or fled to join the Pola boats evacuating to Germany.

== List of U-boats ==
- U-21, a Type U-19 submarine. In 1916 nominally served as U-16 of Austro-Hungarian navy in order to legally attack Italian ships. In 1917 returned to Germany for operations in North Sea.
- U-33 Sank the Russian hospital ship Portugal on 30 March 1916
- U-38 Based at Pola, captain accused of war crimes for attacks on civilian vessels without warning
- UB-3 Assembled at Pola April 1915, disappeared in May en route to Constantinople
- UB-7
- UB-8
- UB-14
- UB-42
- UB-45
- UB-44 Initially based at Pola, lost en route to Constantinople August 1916
- UB-46
- UB-66
- UB-68
- UC-13
- UC-15
- UC-23
- UC-37

== Commanding officers ==
Date	Commander	Title
1915	?	
1916	?	
1917	K/L Kreuger	(Chef) Commanding Officer (CO) Mediterranean Division
1918	K/L Adam	(Chef) CO Constantinople Half-Flotilla
