= SM UB-7 =

German Type UB I-class submarine

History

German Empire
- Name: UB-7
- Ordered: 15 October 1914
- Builder: Germaniawerft, Kiel
- Yard number: 245
- Laid down: 30 November 1914
- Launched: April 1915
- Commissioned: 6 May 1915
- Fate: Disappeared after 27 September 1916

General characteristics
- Class & type: Type UB I submarine
- Displacement: 127 t (125 long tons) surfaced; 142 t (140 long tons) submerged
- Length: 28.10 m (92 ft 2 in) (o/a)
- Beam: 3.15 m (10 ft 4 in)
- Draught: 3.03 m (9 ft 11 in)
- Propulsion: 1 × propeller shaft; 1 × Daimler 4-cylinder diesel engine, 59 bhp (44 kW); 1 × Siemens-Schuckert electric motor, 119 shp (89 kW)
- Speed: 6.47 knots (11.98 km/h; 7.45 mph) surfaced; 5.51 knots (10.20 km/h; 6.34 mph) submerged
- Range: 1,650 nmi (3,060 km; 1,900 mi) at 5 knots (9.3 km/h; 5.8 mph) surfaced; 45 nmi (83 km; 52 mi) at 4 knots (7.4 km/h; 4.6 mph)
- Test depth: 50 metres (160 ft)
- Complement: 14
- Armament: 2 × 45 cm (17.7 in) bow torpedo tubes; 2 × torpedoes; 1 × 8 mm (0.31 in) machine gun
- Notes: 33-second diving time

Service record
- Part of: Pola Flotilla; 6 May – 21 June 1915; Constantinople Flotilla; 21 June 1915 – 27 September 1916
- Commanders: Oblt.z.S. Wilhelm Werner; 6 May 1915 – 11 April 1916; Oblt.z.S. Hans Lütjohann; 12 April – 27 September 1916
- Operations: 15 patrols
- Victories: 4 merchant ships sunk (6,283 GRT)

SM UB-7 (Note: "SM" stands for "Seiner Majestät" (English: His Majesty's) and combined with the U for Unterseeboot would be translated as His Majesty's Submarine.) was a German Type UB I submarine or U-boat in the German Imperial Navy (German: Kaiserliche Marine) during World War I. She disappeared in the Black Sea in September 1916.

UB-7 was ordered in October 1914 and was laid down at the AG Weser shipyard in Bremen in November. UB-7 was a little over 28 metres (92 ft) in length and displaced between 127 and 141 tonnes (125 and 139 long tons), depending on whether surfaced or submerged. She carried two torpedoes for her two bow torpedo tubes and was also armed with a deck-mounted machine gun. UB-7 was originally one of a pair of UB I boats sent to the Austro-Hungarian Navy to replace an Austrian pair to be sent to the Dardanelles, and was broken into sections and shipped by rail to Pola in March 1915 for reassembly. She was launched in April and commissioned as SM UB-7 in the German Imperial Navy in May when the Austrians opted out of the agreement.

Although briefly a part of the Pola Flotilla at commissioning, UB-7 spent the majority of her career patrolling the Black Sea as part of the Constantinople Flotilla. The U-boat sank one ship of 6,011 GRT in September 1915. In October, she helped repel a Russian bombardment of Bulgaria. She was considered for transfer to the Bulgarian Navy, but disappeared in late September 1916 before a transfer could take place. Her fate is officially unknown, but sources report that may have struck a mine or been sunk by a Russian airplane.

== Design and construction ==
After the German Army's rapid advance along the North Sea coast in the earliest stages of World War I, the German Imperial Navy found itself without suitable submarines that could be operated in the narrow and shallow seas off Flanders. Project 34, a design effort begun in mid-August 1914, produced the Type UB I design: a small submarine that could be shipped by rail to a port of operations and quickly assembled. Constrained by railroad size limitations, the UB I design called for a boat about 28 metres (92 ft) long and displacing about 125 tonnes (123 long tons) with two torpedo tubes. (Note: A further refinement of the design—replacing the torpedo tubes with mine chutes but changing little else—evolved into the Type UC I coastal minelaying submarine. See: Miller, p. 458.) UB-7 was part of the initial allotment of eight submarines—numbered UB-1 to UB-8—ordered on 15 October from Germaniawerft of Kiel, just shy of two months after planning for the class began.

UB-7 was laid down by Germaniawerft in Kiel on 30 November. As built, UB-7 was 28.10 metres (92 ft 2 in) long, 3.15 metres (10 ft 4 in) abeam, and had a draft of 3.03 metres (9 ft 11 in). She had a single 59-brake-horsepower (44 kW) Daimler 4-cylinder diesel engine for surface travel, and a single 119-shaft-horsepower (89 kW) Siemens-Schuckert electric motor for underwater travel, both attached to a single propeller shaft. Her top speeds were 6.47 knots (11.98 km/h; 7.45 mph), surfaced, and 5.51 knots (10.20 km/h; 6.34 mph), submerged. At more moderate speeds, she could sail up to 1,650 nautical miles (3,060 km; 1,900 mi) on the surface before refueling, and up to 45 nautical miles (83 km; 52 mi) submerged before recharging her batteries. Like all boats of the class, UB-7 was rated to a diving depth of 50 metres (160 ft), and could completely submerge in 33 seconds.

UB-7 was armed with two 45-centimeter (17.7 in) torpedoes in two bow torpedo tubes. She was also outfitted for a single 8-millimeter (0.31 in) machine gun on deck. UB-7's standard complement consisted of one officer and thirteen enlisted men.

While UB-7's construction neared completion in early March 1915, Enver Pasha and other Turkish leaders were pleading with their German and Austro-Hungarian allies to send submarines to the Dardanelles to help attack the British and French fleet pounding Turkish positions. The Germans induced the Austro-Hungarian Navy (German: Kaiserliche und Königliche Kriegsmarine or K.u.K. Kriegsmarine) to send two boats—its own Germaniawerft-built boats U-3 and U-4—with the promise of UB-7 and UB-8 as replacements.

When work on UB-7 and UB-8 was complete at the Germaniwerft yard, they were both readied for rail shipment. The process of shipping a UB I boat involved breaking the submarine down into what was essentially a knock down kit. Each boat was broken into approximately fifteen pieces and loaded onto eight railway flatcars. The boats were ready for shipment to the main Austrian naval base at Pola on 15 March, despite the fact that the Austrian pair was still not ready. German engineers and technicians that accompanied the German boats to Pola worked under the supervision of Kapitänleutnant Hans Adam, head of the newly created U-boat special command (German: Sonderkommando). Typically, the UB I assembly process took about two to three weeks, and, accordingly, UB-7 was launched at Pola sometime in April.

== Career ==
During her trials, UB-7 developed a leak which took some time to repair. In the meantime, she was assigned the Austrian number of U-7 and an Austrian commander. Her German crew at Pola—since it was still the intent for UB-7 to be transferred to the K.u.K. Kriegsmarine—wore either civilian clothes or Austrian uniforms. As time dragged on, the Austrian U-3 and U-4 were still not ready, (Note: The Austrian U-3 had developed a leak and was undergoing repairs that eventually kept her at Pola until 27 April. See: "Tengeralattjárók" (PDF) (in Hungarian). Imperial and Royal Navy Association. p. 3. Archived from the original (PDF) on 11 October 2021.) and eventually Admiral Anton Haus, the head of the Austrian Navy, reneged on his commitment because of the overt hostility from neighbor and former ally Italy. (Note: Italy declared war on Austria-Hungary on 23 May 1915.)

With the change of heart from the Austrians, Germany resolved to retain UB-7 and send her to the aid of the Turks. So, upon completion of her leak repairs, the boat was commissioned into the German Imperial Navy as SM UB-7 on 6 May under the command of Oberleutnant zur See Wilhelm Werner, a 26-year-old native of Apolda. (Note: Werner was in the Navy's April 1905 cadet class with 36 other future U-boat captains, including Hermann von Fischel, Carl-Siegfried Ritter von Georg, Kurt Hartwig, and Hans von Mellenthin. See: Helgason, Guðmundur. "WWI Officer Crews: Crew 4/05". German and Austrian U-boats of World War I - Kaiserliche Marine - Uboat.net.) At commissioning, the boat temporarily joined the Pola Flotilla (German: Deutsche U-Halbflotille Pola).

Because of her limited range, UB-7 would not have been able to make the entire journey to Turkey, so on the night on 15/16 May, she was towed by the Austrian destroyer SMS Triglav through the Straits of Otranto and into the Ionian Sea. (Note: UB-8 had been similarly towed by the Austrian cruiser Novara on 2 May.) By June, UB-7 had reached Smyrna—not having any success on her journey there—and joined U-21 and UB-8 in the Constantinople Flotilla (German: U-boote der Mittelmeer division in Konstantinopel). Once there, UB-7 was ineffective because she was hampered by her limited torpedo supply and her weak engines, which made negotiating the strong Dardanelles currents nearly impossible. Because of this, UB-7 was sent to patrol in the Black Sea in July, cruising without success from the 5th to the 22nd.

In September 1915, UB-7 and UB-8 were sent to Varna, Bulgaria, and from there, to patrol off the Russian Black Sea coast. On 18 September, UB-7 torpedoed and sank the British steamer Patagonia about 10.5 nautical miles (19.4 km; 12.1 mi) from Odessa. (Note: Patagonia—cut off from the United Kingdom because the only exit from the Black Sea, the Bosporus, was under Ottoman control—was in service as a Russian naval transport when she was sunk. See: Helgason, Guðmundur. "Ships hit during WWI: Patagonia". German and Austrian U-boats of World War I - Kaiserliche Marine - Uboat.net.) The cargo ship, of 6,011 gross register tons (GRT), was the only ship credited to UB-7, and the only one sunk by any of the Constantinople Flotilla in the month.

Because Bulgaria had joined the Central Powers, battleships of the Russian Black Sea Fleet, and aircraft from the seaplane carriers Almaz and Imperator Nikolai I began attacks on Varna and the Bulgarian coast on 25 October. UB-7 and UB-8, both based out of Varna by this time, sortied to disrupt the bombardment. Off Varna on the 27th, UB-7 got in position to fire a torpedo at the Panteleimon (most well-known under her former name of Potemkin). Although UB-7's crew heard what they thought was the torpedo explode, it did not hit Panteleimon. Despite the lack of success, the attempt did cause the Russians to break off their attacks and withdraw.

In early 1916, UB-7 and UB-8 were still cruising in the Black Sea out of Varna. The Germans did not have good luck in the Black Sea, which was not a priority for them. The Bulgarians, who saw the value of the submarines in repelling Russian attacks, began negotiations to purchase UB-7 and UB-8. Bulgarian sailors practiced in the pair of boats and technicians were sent to Kiel for training at the German submarine school there. The transfer of UB-8 to the Bulgarian Navy took place on 25 May 1916, but for reasons unreported in sources, UB-7 remained under the German flag.

In July 1916, the Germans sent SMS Breslau to mine off Novorossisk. To attempt to neutralize any Russian response, UB-7—under the command of Hans Lütjohann, who had taken over for Werner when he returned to Germany to command the new U-55—was stationed off Sevastopol to attack any ships that sailed in response to the mission. Unfortunately, Russian seaplanes spotted UB-7 and bombed the U-boat, preventing her from accomplishing her goal. With the submarine out of the way, Rear Admiral Aleksandr Kolchak sortied with dreadnought Imperatritsa Mariya, cruiser Kagul, and five destroyers. The Russian fleet engaged Breslau, which was forced to abort her mission and retire. Sources are quiet on damage, if any, suffered by UB-7.

== Summary of raiding history ==
Date	Name	Nationality	Tonnage (Note: Tonnages are in gross register tons)	Fate
15 September 1915	Patagonia	United Kingdom	6,011	Sunk
8 April 1916	Sal’dagan	Russian Empire	75	Sunk
9 April 1916	Gryoza	Russian Empire	119	Sunk
31 August 1916	Unidentified Sailing Vessel	Russian Empire	78	Sunk
		Total:	6,283	

== Fate ==
On 27 September 1916, UB-7 departed Varna for operations off Sevastopol and was never heard from again. According to some sources, UB-7 was mined somewhere in the Black Sea. In June 1917, a Russian pilot captured by the Germans reported that a Russian airplane bombed and sank UB-7 on 1 October at position 44°30′N 33°15′E, near the Chersones Lighthouse. Authors Dwight Messimer and Robert Grant are each dubious of this claim, and the fate of UB-7 is still officially unknown. Among the fifteen men lost on UB-7 were the Constantinople Flotilla's senior radio officer, and the first Bulgarian submariner lost during the war, a trainee from Vidin.

== Bibliography ==
- Bendert, Harald (2000). Die UB-Boote der Kaiserlichen Marine, 1914-1918. Einsätze, Erfolge, Schicksal (in German). Hamburg: Verlag E.S. Mittler & Sohn GmbH. ISBN 3-8132-0713-7.
- Gröner, Erich; Jung, Dieter; Maass, Martin (1991). U-boats and Mine Warfare Vessels. German Warships 1815–1945. Vol. 2. Translated by Thomas, Keith; Magowan, Rachel. London: Conway Maritime Press. ISBN 0-85177-593-4.
- Gardiner, Robert; Gray, Randal, eds. (1985). Conway's All the World's Fighting Ships 1906–1921. Annapolis, Maryland: Naval Institute Press. ISBN 978-0-87021-907-8. OCLC 12119866.
- Gibson, R. H.; Maurice Prendergast (2003) [1931]. The German Submarine War, 1914–1918. Annapolis, Maryland: Naval Institute Press. ISBN 9781591143147. OCLC 52924732.
- Grant, Robert M. (2002) [1964]. U-boats Destroyed: The Effect of Anti-submarine Warfare, 1914–1918. Penzance: Periscope Publishing. ISBN 978-1-904381-00-6. OCLC 50215640.
- Йорданов, Николай (1999). Първата българска подводница ("The First Bulgarian Submarine") (in Bulgarian). Vol. кн. 3. София: Военно-исторически сборник.
- Karau, Mark D. (2003). Wielding the Dagger: the MarineKorps Flandern and the German War Effort, 1914–1918. Westport, Connecticut: Praeger. ISBN 978-0-313-32475-8. OCLC 51204317.
- Koburger, Charles W. (2001). The Central Powers in the Adriatic, 1914–1918: War in a Narrow Sea. Westport, Connecticut: Praeger. ISBN 978-0-275-97071-0. OCLC 44550580.
- Messimer, Dwight R. (2002). Verschollen: World War I U-boat losses. Annapolis, Maryland: Naval Institute Press. ISBN 978-1-55750-475-3. OCLC 231973419.
- Miller, David (2002). The Illustrated Directory of Submarines of the World. St. Paul, Minnesota: MBI Pub. Co. ISBN 978-0-7603-1345-9. OCLC 50208951.
- Polmar, Norman; Noot, Jurrien (1991). Submarines of the Russian and Soviet Navies: 1718–1990. Annapolis, Maryland: Naval Institute Press. ISBN 978-0-87021-570-4. OCLC 231311146.
- Sondhaus, Lawrence (1994). The Naval Policy of Austria-Hungary, 1867–1918: Navalism, Industrial Development, and the Politics of Dualism. West Lafayette, Indiana: Purdue University Press. ISBN 978-1-55753-034-9. OCLC 59919233.
- Tarrant, V. E. (1989). The U-Boat Offensive: 1914–1945. Annapolis, Maryland: Naval Institute Press. ISBN 978-0-87021-764-7. OCLC 20338385.
- Tennent, A. J. (2006) [1990]. British Merchant Ships Sunk by U boats in the 1914–1918 War. Penzance: Periscope Publishing. ISBN 1-904381-36-7.
- Williamson, Gordon (2002). U-boats of the Kaiser's Navy. Oxford: Osprey. ISBN 978-1-84176-362-0. OCLC 48627495.
