= SM UB-42 =

German Type UB II submarine

- SM UB-42

History

German Empire
- Name: UB-42
- Ordered: 31 July 1915
- Builder: AG Weser, Bremen
- Yard number: 244
- Laid down: 3 September 1915
- Launched: 4 March 1916
- Commissioned: 23 March 1916
- Fate: Broken up at Malta, 1920

General characteristics
- Class & type: Type UB II submarine
- Displacement: 279 t (275 long tons) surfaced; 305 t (300 long tons) submerged
- Length: 36.90 m (121 ft 1 in) o/a; 27.90 m (91 ft 6 in) pressure hull
- Beam: 4.37 m (14 ft 4 in) o/a; 3.85 m (12 ft 8 in) pressure hull
- Draught: 3.75 m (12 ft 4 in)
- Propulsion: 1 × propeller shaft; 2 ×four-stroke 6-cylinder diesel engine, 270 PS (200 kW; 270 bhp); 2 × electric motor, 280 PS (210 kW; 280 shp)
- Speed: 9.06 knots (16.78 km/h; 10.43 mph) surfaced; 5.71 knots (10.57 km/h; 6.57 mph) submerged
- Range: 7,030 nmi (13,020 km; 8,090 mi) at 5 knots (9.3 km/h; 5.8 mph) surfaced; 45 nmi (83 km; 52 mi) at 4 knots (7.4 km/h; 4.6 mph) submerged
- Complement: 2 officers, 21 men
- Armament: 2 × 50 cm (19.7 in) torpedo tubes; 4 × torpedoes (later 6); 1 × 8.8 cm (3.5 in) Uk L/30 deck gun

Service record
- Part of: Pola Flotilla; 4 May – 16 August 1916; Constantinople Flotilla; 16 August 1916 – 11 November 1918
- Commanders: Kptlt. Fritz Wernicke; 23 March 1916 – 13 May 1917; Oblt. Kurt Schwarz; 14 May 1917 – 5 April 1918; Kptlt. Erich von Rohrscheidt; 6 April – 2 July 1918; Ltn. Herbert Nolde; 3 July – 1 September 1918; Kptlt. Hans Georg Lübbe; 2–18 September 1918; Oblt. Freiherr Cassius von Montigny; 19 September – 1 November 1918; Kptlt. Peter Ernst Eiffe; 2–26 November 1918
- Operations: 21 patrols
- Victories: 11 merchant ships sunk (16,061 GRT); 1 warship damaged (1,200 tons); 1 merchant ship taken as prize (97 GRT)

SM UB-42 was a Type UB II submarine or U-boat for the German Imperial Navy (German: Kaiserliche Marine) during World War I. UB-42 operated in the Mediterranean and the Black Seas during the war. She was broken up at Malta in 1920.

UB-42 was ordered in July 1915 and was laid down at the AG Weser shipyard in Bremen in September. UB-42 was 36.90 m (121 ft 1 in) in length and displaced between 270 and 305 tonnes (266 and 300 long tons), depending on whether surfaced or submerged. She was equipped to carry a complement of four torpedoes for her two bow torpedo tubes and had an 5 cm (1.97 in) deck gun. As part of a group of six submarines selected for Mediterranean service, UB-42 was broken into railcar sized components and shipped to Pola where she was assembled, launched and commissioned in March 1916.

In 21 patrols during the war, UB-42 sank eleven ships of 16,061 gross register tons (GRT), captured one 97 GRT vessel as prize, and damaged HMS Veronica a British Acacia-class sloop. In October 1916, UB-42 delivered five Georgians who had gold to help finance a Georgian independence movement. After the surrender of the Ottoman Empire in late October 1918, UB-42 fled to Sevastopol, where she was surrendered in November. UB-42 was taken to Malta, where she was broken up in 1920.

== Design and construction ==
The German UB II design improved upon the design of the UB I boats, which had been ordered in September 1914. In service, the UB I boats were found to be too small and too slow. A major problem was that, because they had a single propeller shaft/engine combo, if either component failed, the U-boat became almost totally disabled. To rectify this flaw, the UB II boats featured twin propeller shafts and twin engines (one shaft for each engine), which also increased the U-boat's top speed. The new design also included more powerful batteries, larger torpedo tubes, and a deck gun. As a UB II boat, U-47 could also carry twice the torpedo load of her UB I counterparts, and nearly ten times as much fuel. To contain all of these changes the hull was larger, and the surface and submerged displacement was more than double that of the UB I boats.

The German Imperial Navy ordered UB-42 from AG Weser of Bremen on 31 July 1915 as one of a series of six UB II boats (numbered from UB-42 to UB-47). UB-42 was 36.90 metres (121 ft 1 in) long and 4.37 metres (14 ft 4 in) abeam. She had a single hull with saddle tanks and had a draught of 3.75 metres (12 ft 4 in) when surfaced. She displaced 305 tonnes (300 long tons) while submerged but only 272 tonnes (268 long tons) on the surface.

The submarine was equipped with twin Daimler diesel engines and twin electric motors—for surfaced and submerged running, respectively—that drove one propeller shaft. UB-42 had a surface speed of up to 9.06 knots (16.78 km/h; 10.43 mph) and could go as fast as 5.71 knots (10.57 km/h; 6.57 mph) while underwater. The U-boat could carry up to 28 tonnes (28 long tons) of diesel fuel, giving her a range of 7,030 nautical miles (13,020 km; 8,090 mi) at 5 knots (9.3 km/h; 5.8 mph). Her electric motors and batteries provided a range of 45 nautical miles (83 km; 52 mi) at 4 knots (7.4 km/h; 4.6 mph) while submerged.

UB-42 was equipped with two 50-centimeter (19.7 in) bow torpedo tubes and could carry four torpedoes. The U-boat was also armed with one 8.8 cm (3.5 in) Uk L/30 deck gun.

UB-42 was laid down on 3 September 1915. As one of six U-boats selected for service in the Mediterranean while under construction, UB-42 was broken into railcar-sized components and shipped overland to the Austro-Hungarian port of Pola. Shipyard workers from Weser assembled the boat and her five sisters at Pola, where she was launched on 4 March 1916.

== Service career ==
UB-42 was commissioned into the German Imperial Navy on 23 March 1916 under the command of Kapitänleutnant Fritz Wernicke. (Note: The 30-year-old Wernicke had been in the Navy's April 1905 cadet class with 36 other future U-boat captains, including Hermann von Fischel, Carl-Siegfried Ritter von Georg, Kurt Hartwig, and Hans von Mellenthin. For Wernicke information, see: Helgason, Guðmundur. "WWI U-boat commanders: Fritz Wernicke". German and Austrian U-boats of World War I - Kaiserliche Marine - Uboat.net. For cadet crew information, see: Helgason, Guðmundur. "WWI Officer Crews: Crew 4/05". German and Austrian U-boats of World War I - Kaiserliche Marine - Uboat.net.) UB-42, Wernicke's first U-boat command, was assigned to the Navy's Pola Flotilla (German: Deutsche U-Halbflotille Pola). Although the flotilla was based in Pola, the site of the main Austro-Hungarian Navy base, boats of the flotilla operated out of the Austro-Hungarian base at Cattaro which was located farther south and closer to the Mediterranean. German U-boats typically returned to Pola only for repairs. The first months of service for UB-42 proved unsuccessful; the U-boat sank no ships while in the Pola Flotilla.

After Germany's conquest of Southern Romania (see Romania during World War I), the German Imperial Navy had sufficient fuel oil for submarines located in the Black Sea. UB-42 and three of her sister ships in the Pola Flotilla were ordered to Constantinople and, en route, had to navigate through the Dardanelles, which had been heavily mined by the Allies in the middle of 1916. (Note: The other three boats were UB-44, UB-45, and UB-46.) UB-42 joined the Constantinople Flotilla (German: U-boote der Mittelmeerdivision in Konstantinopal) on 16 August.

The German submarines in the Black Sea accomplished little, sinking only six ships between August 1916 and the end of the year. UB-42 sank half of the six in September and October. On 3 September, Wernicke and UB-42 achieved their first success when they sank the Russian transport Peter Darcy in the Black Sea. The 731 GRT ship was headed from Constantza to Odessa when torpedoed by UB-42. On 30 September 1916, near the Romanian port of Sulina, UB-42 launched a torpedo at the Romanian torpedo boat Smeul, but missed. The Romanian warship counterattacked, damaging the submarine's periscope and conning tower and forcing her to retreat.

In April 1917, UB-42 was operating in the Mediterranean when she made attacks on four ships. On 1 April, Wernicke sank the 122 GRT Italian sailing vessel. Flora, north of Thilos. On 14 April, Wernicke torpedoed the British Acacia-class sloop HMS Veronica 45 nautical miles (83 km; 52 mi) off Alexandria, damaging the 1,200 tons vessel. Two days later, UB-42 sank the 86 GRT Egyptian sailing ship off Gaza and, a week after that, sank a 15 GRT Italian sailing vessel, Boro, east of Rhodes in the Aegean Sea.

On 14 May, Wernicke was succeeded by Kapitänleutnant Kurt Schwarz as commander of UB-42. The 27-year-old Schwarz, who had previously commanded the Type UB I boat UB-14, led UB-42 to sink her largest ship, Cestrian, on 24 June. The 8,912 GRT Leyland Line steamship was in use as a troopship, carrying 800 troops and horses when Schwarz sank her 4 nautical miles (7.4 km; 4.6 mi) southeast of Skyros in the Aegean. Three of Cestrian's crewmen were killed in the attack and, according to R. H. Gibson and Maurice Prendergast, "splendid discipline" among the embarked troops was the sole reason that none were lost.

In early October, UB-42 had returned to the Black Sea, when she was ordered to deliver five Georgians with gold to finance a Georgian independence movement. While remaining in the Black Sea, UB-42 sank the sailing ships Agios Georgios on 10 October, and Francesco Patrino in November. On 22 November, she torpedoed the 1,086 GRT Siracusy while the latter was at anchor off the Georgian coast. UB-46 also shelled Tuapse while in the northern Black Sea.

Kapitänleutnant Erich von Rohrscheidt assumed command of UB-42 on 6 April 1918, and six week later, led the U-boat in capturing the motor sailing vessel Sergij as prize six weeks later off Novorossisk. In September, Kapitänleutnant Hans Georg Lübbe (who had succeeded Herbert Nolde after his two-month stint as commander of UB-42) led the U-boat in sinking her final ship. On the night of 7/8 September, the 1,833 GRT Italian steamer Vicenza was sunk south of Salonica. UB-42's commanding officer was changed twice more before the end of the war, but the submarine sank no more ships.

After the signing of the Armistice of Mudros on 30 October ended the war for the Ottoman Empire, the four remaining U-boats of the Constantinople Flotilla—UB-14, UB-42, UC-23, and UC-37—fled to Sevastopol. There they were surrendered on 26 November. UB-42 was broken up at Malta in 1920.

== Summary of raiding history ==
Ships sunk or damaged by SM UB-42
Date	Name	Nationality	Tonnage (Note: Merchant ship tonnages are in gross register tons. Military vessels are listed by tons displacement.)	Fate
3 September 1916	Peter Darcy	Russian Empire	731	Sunk
5 October 1916	St. Nikolei	Russian Empire	150	Sunk
19 October 1916	Czarita	Russian Empire	2,891	Sunk
1 April 1917	Flora	Kingdom of Italy	122	Sunk
14 April 1917	HMS Veronica	Royal Navy	1,200	Damaged
16 April 1917	Rosetta	Egypt	86	Sunk
23 April 1917	Boro	Kingdom of Italy	15	Sunk
24 June 1917	Cestrian	United Kingdom	8,912	Sunk
10 October 1917	Agios Georgios	Russian Empire	123	Sunk
November 1917	Francesco Patrino	Russian Empire	112	Sunk
22 November 1917	Siracusy	Russian Empire	1,086	Sunk
16 May 1918	Sergij	Russian Empire	97	Captured as prize
7 September 1918	Vicenza	Kingdom of Italy	1,833	Sunk
		(Note: Tonnage of ships captured as prizes is included in tonnage sunk.)Sunk: Damaged: Total:	16,158; 1,200; 17,358	

== Bibliography ==
- Bendert, Harald (2000). Die UB-Boote der Kaiserlichen Marine, 1914-1918. Einsätze, Erfolge, Schicksal (in German). Hamburg: Verlag E.S. Mittler & Sohn GmbH. ISBN 3-8132-0713-7.
- Gardiner, Robert; Gray, Randal, eds. (1985). Conway's All the World's Fighting Ships 1906–1921. Annapolis, Maryland: Naval Institute Press. ISBN 978-0-87021-907-8. OCLC 12119866.
- Gibson, R. H.; Prendergast, Maurice (2003) [1931]. The German Submarine War, 1914–1918. Annapolis, Maryland: Naval Institute Press. ISBN 978-1-59114-314-7. OCLC 52924732.
- Gröner, Erich; Jung, Dieter; Maass, Martin (1991). U-boats and Mine Warfare Vessels. German Warships 1815–1945. Vol. 2. Translated by Thomas, Keith; Magowan, Rachel. London: Conway Maritime Press. ISBN 0-85177-593-4.
- Halpern, Paul G. (1994). A Naval History of World War I. Annapolis, Maryland: Naval Institute Press. ISBN 978-0-87021-266-6. OCLC 28411665.
- Messimer, Dwight R. (2002). Verschollen: World War I U-boat losses. Annapolis, Maryland: Naval Institute Press. ISBN 978-1-55750-475-3. OCLC 231973419.
- Miller, David (2002). The Illustrated Directory of Submarines of the World. St. Paul, Minnesota: MBI Pub. Co. ISBN 978-0-7603-1345-9. OCLC 50208951.
- Rössler, Eberhard (1979). Die deutschen U-Boote und ihre Werften: eine Bilddokumentation über den deutschen U-Bootbau; in zwei Bänden (in German). Vol. I. Munich: Bernard & Graefe. ISBN 3-7637-5213-7.
- Tarrant, V. E. (1989). The U-Boat Offensive: 1914–1945. Annapolis, Maryland: Naval Institute Press. ISBN 978-0-87021-764-7. OCLC 20338385.
- Williamson, Gordon (2002). U-boats of the Kaiser's Navy. Oxford: Osprey. ISBN 978-1-84176-362-0. OCLC 48627495.
