= SM UB-45 =

German Type UB II submarine

- UB-45 at Varna in 1936. The mine damage that sank the U-boat during World War I is visible at right.

History

German Empire
- Name: UB-45
- Ordered: 31 July 1915
- Builder: AG Weser, Bremen
- Yard number: 247
- Laid down: 3 September 1915
- Launched: 12 May 1916
- Commissioned: 26 May 1916
- Fate: Mined, 6 November 1916

General characteristics
- Class & type: Type UB II submarine
- Displacement: 272 t (268 long tons) surfaced; 305 t (300 long tons) submerged
- Length: 36.90 m (121 ft 1 in) o/a; 27.90 m (91 ft 6 in) pressure hull
- Beam: 4.37 m (14 ft 4 in) o/a; 3.85 m (12 ft 8 in) pressure hull
- Draught: 3.68 m (12 ft 1 in)
- Propulsion: 1 × propeller shaft; 2 × 4-stroke 6-cylinder diesel engine, 284 PS (209 kW; 280 bhp); 2 × electric motor, 280 PS (210 kW; 280 shp)
- Speed: 8.82 knots (16.33 km/h; 10.15 mph) surfaced; 6.22 knots (11.52 km/h; 7.16 mph) submerged
- Range: 6,940 nmi (12,850 km; 7,990 mi) at 5 knots (9.3 km/h; 5.8 mph) surfaced; 45 nmi (83 km; 52 mi) at 4 knots (7.4 km/h; 4.6 mph) submerged
- Complement: 23
- Armament: 2 × 50 cm (19.7 in) bow torpedo tubes; 4 torpedoes; 1 × 8.8 cm (3.5 in) Uk L/30 deck gun

Service record
- Part of: Pola Flotilla; 26 May – 12 August 1916; Constantinople Flotilla; 12 August – 6 November 1916
- Commanders: Kptlt. Karl Palis; 26 May – 6 November 1916
- Operations: 5 patrols
- Victories: 4 merchant ships sunk (15,361 GRT)

SM UB-45 was a Type UB II submarine or U-boat built for and operated by the German Imperial Navy (German: Kaiserliche Marine) during World War I. UB-45 operated in the Mediterranean and the Black Seas, and was sunk by a mine in November 1916.

UB-45 was ordered in July 1915 and was laid down at the AG Weser shipyard in Bremen in September. UB-45 was about 37 metres (121 ft 5 in) in length and displaced between 270 and 305 tonnes (266 and 300 long tons), depending on whether surfaced or submerged. She was equipped to carry a complement of four torpedoes for her two bow torpedo tubes and had an 5-centimeter (2.0 in) deck gun. As part of a group of six submarines selected for Mediterranean service, UB-45 was broken into railcar-sized components and shipped to Pola where she was assembled and then launched and commissioned in May 1916.

In five patrols in her six-month career, UB-45 sank four ships of 15,361 gross register tons (GRT). In early November 1916, UB-45 was departing from the base at Varna, Bulgaria, when the U-boat struck a mine and sank rapidly. Fifteen of the twenty men on board were killed in the attack; one of the five crewmen rescued from UB-45 later died from his injuries. UB-45's wreck was located and raised by the Bulgarian Navy in the 1930s with an eye toward rebuilding the submarine. Engineers from AG Weser determined that restoration of the submarine was feasible, but this was never accomplished. Remains recovered from the wreck were buried in Varna after a funeral procession through town in November 1938.

== Design and construction ==
The German UB II design improved upon the design of the UB I boats, which had been ordered in September 1914. In service, the UB I boats were found to be too small and too slow. A major problem was that, because they had a single propeller shaft/engine combo, if either component failed, the U-boat became almost totally disabled. To rectify this flaw, the UB II boats featured twin propeller shafts and twin engines (one shaft for each engine), which also increased the U-boat's top speed. The new design also included more powerful batteries, larger torpedo tubes, and a deck gun. As a UB II boat, U-45 could also carry twice the torpedo load of her UB I counterparts, and nearly ten times as much fuel. To contain all of these changes the hull was larger, and the surface and submerged displacement was more than double that of the UB I boats.

The German Imperial Navy ordered UB-45 from AG Weser on 31 July 1915 as one of a series of six UB II boats (numbered from UB-42 to UB-47). UB-45 was 36.90 metres (121 ft 1 in) long and 4.37 metres (14 ft 4 in) abeam. She had a single hull with saddle tanks and had a draught of 3.68 metres (12 ft 1 in) when surfaced. She displaced 305 tonnes (300 long tons) while submerged but only 272 tonnes (268 long tons) on the surface.

The submarine was equipped with twin Daimler diesel engines and twin Siemens-Schuckert electric motors—for surfaced and submerged running, respectively. UB-45 had a surface speed of up to 8.82 knots (16.33 km/h; 10.15 mph) and could go as fast as 6.22 knots (11.52 km/h; 7.16 mph) while underwater. The U-boat could carry up to 27 tonnes (27 long tons) of diesel fuel, giving her a range of 6,940 nautical miles (12,850 km; 7,990 mi)at 5 knots (9.3 km/h; 5.8 mph). Her electric motors and batteries provided a range of 45 nautical miles (83 km; 52 mi)at 4 knots (7.4 km/h; 4.6 mph) while submerged. UB-45 was equipped with two 50-centimeter (19.7 in) bow torpedo tubes and could carry four torpedoes. The U-boat was also armed with one 8.8 cm (3.5 in) Uk L/30 deck gun.

UB-45 was laid down by AG Weser at its Bremen shipyard on 3 September 1915. As one of six U-boats selected for service in the Mediterranean while under construction, UB-45 was broken into railcar-sized components and shipped overland to the Austro-Hungarian port of Pola. Shipyard workers from Weser assembled the boat and her five sisters at Pola, where she was launched on 12 May 1916.

== Service career ==
SM UB-45 was commissioned into the German Imperial Navy on 26 May 1916 under the command of Oberleutnant zur See Karl Palis. (Note: The 31-year-old Palis had been in the Navy's April 1904 cadet class with 20 other future U-boat captains, including Wilhelm Canaris. For Palis information, see: Helgason, Guðmundur. "WWI U-boat commanders: Karl Palis". German and Austrian U-boats of World War I - Kaiserliche Marine - Uboat.net. For cadet crew information, see: Helgason, Guðmundur. "WWI Officer Crews: Crew 4/04". German and Austrian U-boats of World War I - Kaiserliche Marine - Uboat.net.) UB-45, Palis' second U-boat command, was assigned to the Navy's Pola Flotilla (German: Deutsche U-Halbflotille Pola). Although the flotilla was based in Pola, the site of the main Austro-Hungarian Navy base, boats of the flotilla operated out of the Austro-Hungarian base at Cattaro which was located farther south and closer to the Mediterranean. German U-boats typically returned to Pola only for repairs.

In mid-July, UB-45's first success occurred when in three days she sank two steamers. The first, Virginia, was sunk on the 16th while carrying salt destined for Calcutta. Two men on board the 4,279 GRT British ship were lost when she went down 42 nautical miles (78 km; 48 mi) off Cape Matapan. Two days later, the French ship Ville de Rouen was sunk 120 nautical miles (220 km; 140 mi) southwest of Cape Matapan. The 4,721 GRT Ville de Rouen would be UB-45's largest victim.

Germany's conquest of Romania provided the German Imperial Navy with sufficient fuel oil for submarines to operate in the Black Sea. UB-45 and three of her sister ships in the Pola Flotilla were ordered to Constantinople and, en route, had to navigate through the Dardanelles, which had been heavily mined by the Allies in the middle of 1916. (Note: The other three boats were UB-42, UB-44, and UB-46.) UB-45 joined the Constantinople Flotilla (German: U-boote der Mittelmeerdivision in Konstantinopal) on 12 August.

The German submarines in the Black Sea accomplished little, sinking only six ships between August and the end of the year; UB-45 accounted for two of these while in the Black Sea. On 31 August, UB-45 sank the 2,660 GRT Italian steamer Tevere off Poti. Tevere had been requisitioned by the Imperial Russian Navy and was in use as a transport ship at the time. Two days later, the U-boat torpedoed the 3,701 GRT Gioconda, another Russian transport, 45 nautical miles (83 km; 52 mi) off Trebizond. (Note: Gioconda was towed into Trebizond and converted to a landing platform, making the ship an apparent total loss.) Gioconda was the last ship sunk by UB-45.

The 13 November 1938 funeral procession for UB-45's crewmen after the U-boat's 1936 recovery.

At 14:30 on 6 November, UB-45 was departing Varna, Bulgaria, under escort by the Bulgarian torpedo boat Strogi that had cleared a path through Russian mines. (Note: Messimer identifies the Bulgarian ship as the destroyer Stragi. Conway's All the World's Fighting Ships 1906–1921 (pp. 411–12) reports no such ship, but does report a Bulgarian torpedo boat named Strogi.) At what was thought to be the edge of the minefield, UB-45 swung around Strogi's port side directly into a second minefield that had been laid by Russian forces the night before. A Hertz horn mine exploded between UB-45's control room and engine room with enough force to break the boat in half. UB-45 sank so rapidly that the only survivors were three men on the conning tower and two on deck, all of whom were injured; the other fifteen men on board perished in the attack. One of the survivors died from the severity of his wounds the following day.

In 1932, the Bulgarian Navy conceived a plan to search for the wreck of UB-45 with the intent of raising it for restoration as a training vessel, or, at the very least, to recover the sunken U-boat's 8.8-centimeter (3.5 in) deck gun. An additional consideration was the recovery of the remains of UB-45's crew. On 19 July 1934, after a two-year search, Bulgarian minesweepers discovered the location of the wreck, which was resting at position 43°12′N 28°09′E, near the then Bulgarian–Romanian border. UB-45's wreck was raised in an operation that cost several times less than the cost of a new 8.8-centimeter gun. The remains recovered were buried on 26 February 1936 in a Varna cemetery, after a procession through the town.

Engineers from AG Weser, UB-45's German builder, inspected the hulk and determined that repair of the wreck was feasible. A restoration of the submarine to operating condition, as either a training vessel or a military, would cost 21 million leva (about US$250,000 in 1936 dollars), significantly less than the 56 to 65 million leva ($680,000 to $790,000) that a comparable new submarine would cost. (Note: In 1936, 100 leva equalled about US$1.22. See: Brandt, p. xxxiii.) Ultimately, the Bulgarian Navy opted to order new submarines from Germany rather than repair UB-45. (Note: The Bulgarian submarine order was cancelled by Germany after the start of World War II.) UB-45's deck gun was reused, however, and one of the U-boat's diesel engines was restored to operating condition and used on the training ship Assen.

== Summary of raiding history ==
Ships sunk by SM UB-45
Date	Name	Nationality	Tonnage (Note: Tonnages are in gross register tons)	Fate
16 July 1916	Virginia	United Kingdom	4,279	Sunk
18 July 1916	Ville De Rouen	France	4,721	Sunk
31 August 1916	Tevere	Regia Marina	2,660	Sunk
2 September 1916	Gioconda	Imperial Russian Navy	3,701	Sunk
		Total:	15,361	

== Bibliography ==
- Bendert, Harald (2000). Die UB-Boote der Kaiserlichen Marine, 1914-1918. Einsätze, Erfolge, Schicksal (in German). Hamburg: Verlag E.S. Mittler & Sohn GmbH. ISBN 3-8132-0713-7.
- Gröner, Erich; Jung, Dieter; Maass, Martin (1991). German Warships 1815–1945, U-boats and Mine Warfare Vessels. Vol. 2. Translated by Thomas, Keith; Magowan, Rachel. London: Conway Maritime Press. ISBN 0-85177-593-4.
- Rössler, Eberhard (1979). Die deutschen U-Boote und ihre Werften: eine Bilddokumentation über den deutschen U-Bootbau; in zwei Bänden (in German). Vol. I. Munich: Bernard & Graefe. ISBN 3-7637-5213-7.
- Brandt, Karl (1952). Management of Agriculture and Food in the German-occupied and Other Areas of Fortress Europe: A Study in Military Government. Stanford: Stanford University Press. OCLC 221748245.
- Gardiner, Robert; Gray, Randal, eds. (1985). Conway's All the World's Fighting Ships 1906–1921. Annapolis, Maryland: Naval Institute Press. ISBN 978-0-87021-907-8. OCLC 12119866.
- Halpern, Paul G. (1994). A Naval History of World War I. Annapolis, Maryland: Naval Institute Press. ISBN 978-0-87021-266-6. OCLC 28411665.
- Messimer, Dwight R. (2002). Verschollen: World War I U-boat losses. Annapolis, Maryland: Naval Institute Press. ISBN 978-1-55750-475-3. OCLC 231973419.
- Miller, David (2002). The Illustrated Directory of Submarines of the World. St. Paul, Minnesota: MBI Pub. Co. ISBN 978-0-7603-1345-9. OCLC 50208951.
- Miller, David (2002). The Illustrated Directory of Submarines of the World. St. Paul, Minnesota: MBI Pub. Co. ISBN 978-0-7603-1345-9. OCLC 50208951.
- Tarrant, V. E. (1989). The U-Boat Offensive: 1914–1945. Annapolis, Maryland: Naval Institute Press. ISBN 978-0-87021-764-7. OCLC 20338385.
- Williamson, Gordon (2002). U-boats of the Kaiser's Navy. Oxford: Osprey. ISBN 978-1-84176-362-0. OCLC 48627495.
