= UB7 =

UB7 may refer to:

- UB7, a postcode district in the UB postcode area
- SM UB-7, World War I German submarine
