= SM UB-46 =

German Imperial Navy's Type UB II submarine

Coordinates: 41°26′N 28°35′E

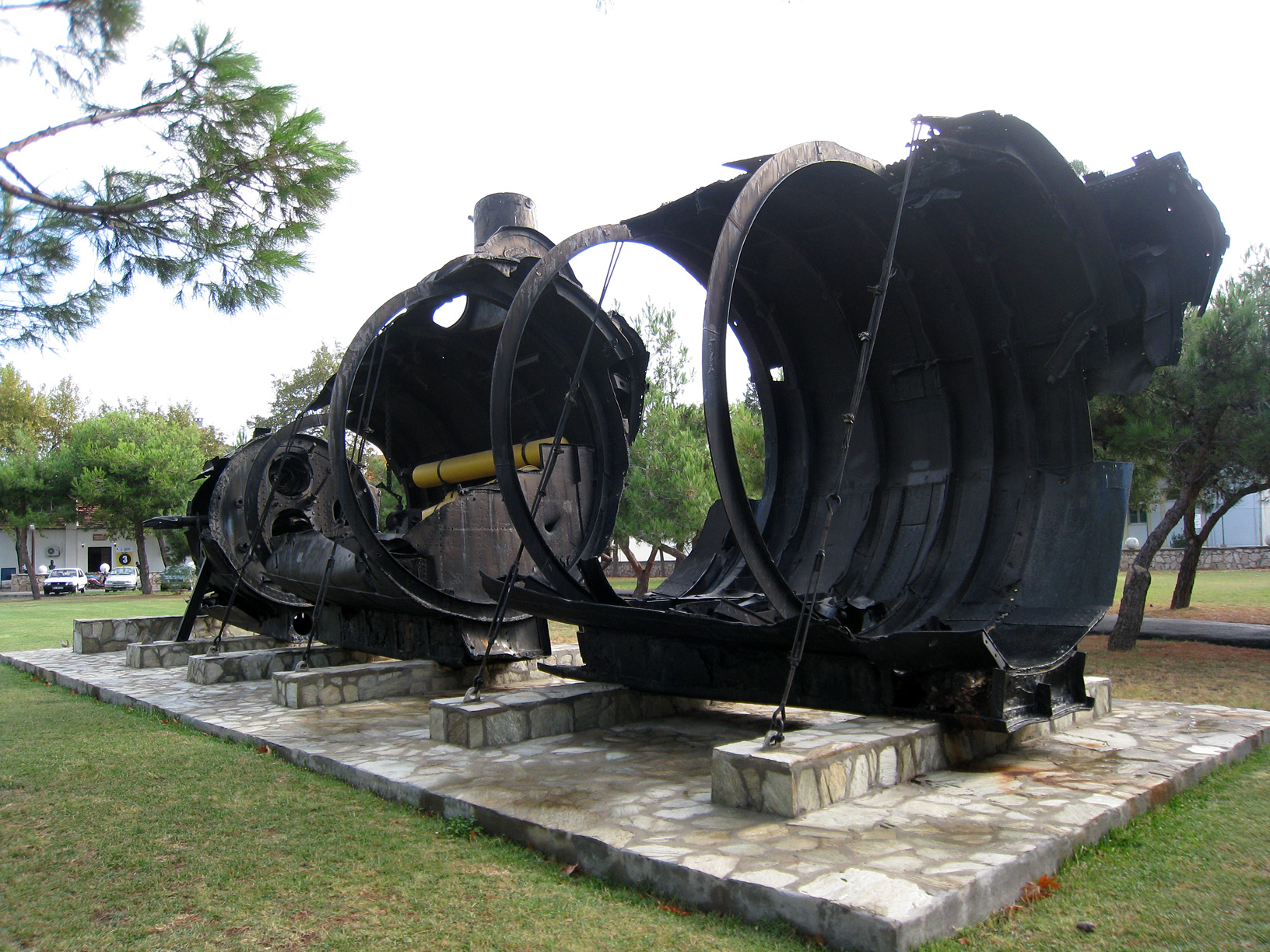
- Wreckage of the UB-46

History

German Empire
- Name: UB-46
- Ordered: 31 July 1915
- Builder: AG Weser, Bremen
- Yard number: 248
- Laid down: 4 September 1915
- Launched: 31 May 1916
- Commissioned: 12 June 1916
- Fate: Mined, 7 December 1916
- Notes: Torpedo room and battery compartment recovered and preserved

General characteristics
- Class & type: Type UB II submarine
- Displacement: 272 t (268 long tons) surfaced; 305 t (300 long tons) submerged
- Length: 36.90 m (121 ft 1 in) o/a; 27.90 m (91 ft 6 in) pressure hull
- Beam: 4.37 m (14 ft 4 in) o/a; 3.85 m (12 ft 8 in) pressure hull
- Draught: 3.68 m (12 ft 1 in)
- Propulsion: 1 × propeller shaft; 2 × 4-stroke 6-cylinder diesel engine, 284 PS (209 kW; 280 bhp); 2 × electric motor, 280 PS (210 kW; 280 shp)
- Speed: 8.82 knots (16.33 km/h; 10.15 mph) surfaced; 6.22 knots (11.52 km/h; 7.16 mph) submerged
- Range: 6,940 nmi (12,850 km; 7,990 mi) at 5 knots (9.3 km/h; 5.8 mph) surfaced; 45 nmi (83 km; 52 mi) at 4 knots (7.4 km/h; 4.6 mph) submerged
- Complement: 22
- Armament: 2 × 50 cm (19.7 in) bow torpedo tubes; 4 torpedoes; 1 × 8.8 cm (3.5 in) Uk L/30 deck gun

Service record
- Part of: Pola Flotilla; 12 June – 7 October 1916; Constantinople Flotilla; 7 October – 7 December 1916
- Commanders: Kptlt. Cäsar Bauer; 12 June – 7 December 1916
- Operations: 5 patrols
- Victories: 4 merchant ships sunk (8,099 GRT)

SM UB-46 was a Type UB II submarine or U-boat for the German Imperial Navy (German: Kaiserliche Marine) during World War I. UB-46 operated in the Mediterranean and the Black Seas, and was sunk by a mine in December 1916.

UB-46 was ordered in July 1915 and was laid down at the AG Weser shipyard in Bremen in September. UB-46 was a little more than 121 feet (37 m) in length and displaced between 270 and 305 tonnes (266 and 300 long tons), depending on whether surfaced or submerged. She was equipped to carry a complement of four torpedoes for her two bow torpedo tubes and had an 5-centimeter (2.0 in) deck gun. As part of a group of six submarines selected for Mediterranean service, UB-46 was broken into railcar sized components and shipped to Pola where she was assembled and launched in May 1916, and commissioned in June.

In early December 1916, during the submarine's fifth patrol, UB-46 struck a mine in the Black Sea a short distance from the north entrance to the Bosphorus and sank with all hands. In her six-month career, UB-46 sank four ships of 8,099 gross register tons (GRT).

== Design and construction ==
The German UB II design improved upon the design of the UB I boats, which had been ordered in September 1914. In service, the UB I boats were found to be too small and too slow. A major problem was that, because they had a single propeller shaft/engine combo, if either component failed, the U-boat became almost totally disabled. To rectify this flaw, the UB II boats featured twin propeller shafts and twin engines (one shaft for each engine), which also increased the U-boat's top speed. The new design also included more powerful batteries, larger torpedo tubes, and a deck gun. As a UB II boat, U-47 could also carry twice the torpedo load of her UB I counterparts, and nearly ten times as much fuel. To contain all of these changes the hull was larger, and the surface and submerged displacement was more than double that of the UB I boats.

The Imperial German Navy ordered UB-46 from AG Weser on 31 July 1915 as one of a series of six UB II boats (numbered from UB-42 to UB-47). UB-46 was 36.90 metres (121 ft 1 in) long and 4.37 metres (14 ft 4 in) abeam. She had a single hull with saddle tanks and had a draught of 3.68 metres (12 ft 1 in) when surfaced. She displaced 305 tonnes (300 long tons) while submerged but only 272 tonnes (268 long tons) on the surface.

The submarine was equipped with twin Daimler diesel engines and twin Siemens-Schuckert electric motors—for surfaced and submerged running, respectively. UB-46 had a surface speed of up to 8.82 knots (16.33 km/h; 10.15 mph) and could go as fast as 6.22 knots (11.52 km/h; 7.16 mph) while underwater. The U-boat could carry up to 27 tonnes (27 long tons) of diesel fuel, giving her a range of 6,940 nautical miles (12,850 km; 7,990 mi)at 5 knots (9.3 km/h; 5.8 mph). Her electric motors and batteries provided a range of 45 nautical miles (83 km; 52 mi)at 4 knots (7.4 km/h; 4.6 mph) while submerged.

UB-46 was equipped with two 50-centimeter (19.7 in) bow torpedo tubes and could carry four torpedoes. The U-boat was also armed with one 8.8 cm (3.5 in) Uk L/30 deck gun.

UB-46 was laid down by AG Weser at its Bremen shipyard on 4 September 1915. As one of six U-boats selected for service in the Mediterranean while under construction, UB-46 was broken into railcar-sized components and shipped overland to the Austro-Hungarian port of Pola. Shipyard workers from Weser assembled the boat and her five sisters at Pola, where she was launched on 17 June.

== Service career ==
SM UB-46 was commissioned into the German Imperial Navy on 12 June 1916 under the command of Oberleutnant zur See Cäsar Bauer. (Note: The 27-year-old Bauer had been in the Navy's April 1904 cadet class with 20 other future U-boat captains, including Wilhelm Canaris. For Bauer information, see: Helgason, Guðmundur. "WWI U-boat commanders: Cäsar Bauer". German and Austrian U-boats of World War I - Kaiserliche Marine - Uboat.net. For cadet crew information, see: Helgason, Guðmundur. "WWI Officer Crews: Crew 4/04". German and Austrian U-boats of World War I - Kaiserliche Marine - Uboat.net.) UB-46, Bauer's third U-boat command, was assigned to the Navy's Pola Flotilla (German: Deutsche U-Halbflotille Pola). Although the flotilla was based in Pola, the site of the main Austro-Hungarian Navy base, boats of the flotilla operated out of the Austro-Hungarian base at Cattaro which was located farther south and closer to the Mediterranean. German U-boats typically returned to Pola only for repairs. After a month at the helm of UB-46, Bauer was promoted to Kapitänleutnant.

On 2 August, Bauer achieved his first success in command of UB-46 when the Japanese steamer Kohina Maru was sunk off Alexandria just short of her destination of Port Said. A week later the U-boat sank the Greek sailing vessel Basileios which was headed back to the Adriatic from Egypt. On 2 October, Bauer torpedoed Huntsfall which was carrying hay to Salonica, and took the ship's master prisoner. The 4,331 gross register tons (GRT) British steamer was the largest ship sunk by UB-46.

After Germany's conquest of Romania (see Romania during World War I), the German Imperial Navy had sufficient fuel oil for submarines located in the Black Sea. UB-46 and three of her sister ships in the Pola Flotilla were ordered to Constantinople and, en route, had to navigate through the Dardanelles, which had been heavily mined by the Allies in the middle of 1916. (Note: The other three boats were UB-42, UB-44, and UB-45.) UB-46 joined the Constantinople Flotilla (German: U-boote der Mittelmeerdivision in Konstantinopal) on 7 October.

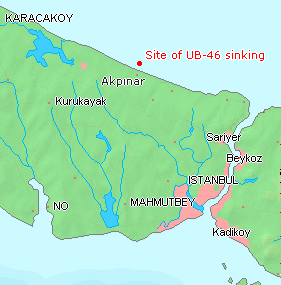
Location map of the sinking of UB-46

The German submarines in the Black Sea accomplished little, sinking only six ships between August and the end of the year. UB-46 sank one of the six ships when she sent down the 116 GRT Russian ship Melanie north of Cape Tarkhan on 7 November. Melanie was the last ship sunk by UB-46. By early December, UB-46 was based out of Varna, Bulgaria.

== Fate ==
On 7 December 1916, the stern of UB-46 struck a Russian mine 300 metres (980 ft) off the shore of the Turkish village of Akpınar, approximately 30 kilometres (19 mi) north-west of the entrance to the Bosphorus. The vessel's entire complement (reported by Helgason as 20) perished in the sinking.

A 16 metres (52 ft) portion of the wreck comprising the forward section of the torpedo room and battery compartment was located in 1993 during coal extraction operations and was salvaged by the Turkish navy; the remainder of the vessel could not be located. She was put on display in an outdoor exhibit at the Turkish Naval Museum in Istanbul. The wreckage was transferred to the Dardanelles Naval Museum at Çanakkale in 2008, where the remains of the vessel are currently on display.

== Summary of raiding history ==
Ships sunk by SM UB-46
Date	Name	Nationality	Tonnage (Note: Tonnages are in gross register tons)	Fate
2 August 1916	Kohina Maru	Japan	3,164	Sunk
9 August 1916	Basileios	Greece	488	Sunk
2 October 1916	Huntsfall	United Kingdom	4,331	Sunk
7 November 1916	Melanie	Russian Empire	116	Sunk
		Total:	8,099	

== Bibliography ==
- Bendert, Harald (2000). Die UB-Boote der Kaiserlichen Marine, 1914-1918. Einsätze, Erfolge, Schicksal (in German). Hamburg: Verlag E.S. Mittler & Sohn GmbH. ISBN 3-8132-0713-7.
- Gröner, Erich; Jung, Dieter; Maass, Martin (1991). German Warships 1815–1945, U-boats and Mine Warfare Vessels. Vol. 2. Translated by Thomas, Keith; Magowan, Rachel. London: Conway Maritime Press. ISBN 0-85177-593-4.
- Rössler, Eberhard (1979). Die deutschen U-Boote und ihre Werften: eine Bilddokumentation über den deutschen U-Bootbau; in zwei Bänden (in German). Vol. I. Munich: Bernard & Graefe. ISBN 3-7637-5213-7.
- Gardiner, Robert; Gray, Randal, eds. (1985). Conway's All the World's Fighting Ships 1906–1921. Annapolis, Maryland: Naval Institute Press. ISBN 978-0-87021-907-8. OCLC 12119866.
- Gibson, R. H.; Prendergast, Maurice (2003) [1931]. The German Submarine War, 1914–1918. Annapolis, Maryland: Naval Institute Press. ISBN 978-1-59114-314-7. OCLC 52924732.
- Halpern, Paul G. (1994). A Naval History of World War I. Annapolis, Maryland: Naval Institute Press. ISBN 978-0-87021-266-6. OCLC 28411665.
- Messimer, Dwight R. (2002). Verschollen: World War I U-boat losses. Annapolis, Maryland: Naval Institute Press. ISBN 978-1-55750-475-3. OCLC 231973419.
- Miller, David (2002). The Illustrated Directory of Submarines of the World. St. Paul, Minnesota: MBI Pub. Co. ISBN 978-0-7603-1345-9. OCLC 50208951.
- Miller, David (2002). The Illustrated Directory of Submarines of the World. St. Paul, Minnesota: MBI Pub. Co. ISBN 978-0-7603-1345-9. OCLC 50208951.
- Tarrant, V. E. (1989). The U-Boat Offensive: 1914–1945. Annapolis, Maryland: Naval Institute Press. ISBN 978-0-87021-764-7. OCLC 20338385.
- Williamson, Gordon (2002). U-boats of the Kaiser's Navy. Oxford: Osprey. ISBN 978-1-84176-362-0. OCLC 48627495.
