= UB18 =

UB18 may refer to:

- UB18, a postcode district in the UB postcode area
- SM UB-18, a World War I German submarine
