= List of shipwrecks in August 1916 =

The list of shipwrecks in August 1916 includes ships sunk, foundered, grounded, or otherwise lost during August 1916.

== 1 August ==
List of shipwrecks: 1 August 1916
Ship	State	Description
Aaro	United Kingdom	World War I: The cargo ship was torpedoed and sunk in the North Sea 25 nautical miles (46 km) south west of Stavanger, Rogaland, Norway by SM U-20 (Imperial German Navy). Three of her crew were killed, survivors were taken as prisoners of war.
Braconash	United Kingdom	World War I: The fishing vessel was scuttled in the North Sea 36 nautical miles (67 km) south east by east of the mouth of the River Tyne by SM UB-39 (Imperial German Navy). Her crew survived.
SMS G94	Imperial German Navy	World War I: The V25-class destroyer struck a mine and sank in the North Sea with the loss of thirteen of her crew.
Heighington	United Kingdom	World War I: The cargo ship was torpedoed and sunk in the Mediterranean Sea 40 nautical miles (74 km) north east of Cape Serrat, Tunisia by SM U-35 (Imperial German Navy). Her crew survived.
Helvetia	United Kingdom	World War I: The trawler was scuttled in the North Sea 5 nautical miles (9.3 km) east of Seaham, County Durham by SM UB-39 (Imperial German Navy). Her crew survived.
Hero	United States	The 14-gross register ton, 39.5-foot (12.0 m) fishing vessel was wrecked on Knik Arm Shoal (61°12′N 150°13′W) near Anchorage, Territory of Alaska. Her crew of two survived.
King James	United Kingdom	World War I: The fishing vessel was sunk in the North Sea 8 nautical miles (15 km) east of Seaham by SM UB-39 (Imperial German Navy). Her crew survived.
Pehr Brahe	Finland	World War I: The coaster was sunk in the Baltic Sea 15 nautical miles (28 km) off Rauma by SM UB-36 (Imperial German Navy).
Rhodesia	United Kingdom	World War I: The trawler was scuttled in the North Sea 4 nautical miles (7.4 km) east north east of the mouth of the River Tyne by SM UB-39 (Imperial German Navy). Her crew survived.
Tatiana	United Kingdom	World War I: The trawler was sunk in the North Sea off the mouth of the River Tyne by SM UB-39 (Imperial German Navy). Her crew survived.

== 2 August ==
List of shipwrecks: 2 August 1916
Ship	State	Description
Bror Oskar	Sweden	World War I: The coaster was sunk in the Baltic Sea 15 nautical miles (28 km) off Rauma, Finland by SM UB-20 (Imperial German Navy). Her crew survived.
Commerce	Sweden	World War I: The coaster was sunk in the Baltic Sea off Hudiksvall, Gävleborg County (61°50′N 18°02′E) by SM UB-20 (Imperial German Navy). Her crew survived.
Eugenia	Italy	World War I: The barque was sunk in the Mediterranean Sea 35 nautical miles (65 km) off the Isola de Vecca (38°40′N 7°45′E) by SM U-35 (Imperial German Navy).
G. C. Gradwell	United Kingdom	World War I: The schooner was shelled and sunk in the English Channel 20 nautical miles (37 km) west north west of Cap d'Antifer, Seine-Inférieure, France by SM UB-18 (Imperial German Navy). Her crew survived.
Kohina Maru	Japan	World War I: The cargo ship was sunk in the Mediterranean Sea off Alexandria, Egypt by SM UB-46 (Imperial German Navy). Her crew survived.
Leonardo da Vinci	Regia Marina	The Conte di Cavour-class battleship capsized at Taranto with the loss of 249 of her 1,000 crew. She was refloated on 17 September 1919 but was not repaired and was scrapped in 1923.
Margaret Sutton	United Kingdom	World War I: The brigantine was scuttled in the English Channel 35 nautical miles (65 km) south south east of St. Catherine's Point, Isle of Wight by SM UB-18 (Imperial German Navy). Her crew survived.
Neptune	Italy	World War I: The brigantine was sunk in the Mediterranean Sea 25 nautical miles (46 km) off Cap Sandolo, Algeria (39°00′N 7°30′E) by SM U-35 (Imperial German Navy).
Olympia	United Kingdom	World War I: The trawler was shelled and sunk in the North Sea 3 nautical miles (5.6 km) east of Coquet Island, Northumberland by SM UB-39 (Imperial German Navy). Her crew survived.
S.D.	United Kingdom	World War I: The Thames barge was shelled and sunk in the English Channel 18 nautical miles (33 km) north west of Cap d'Antifer by SM UB-18 (Imperial German Navy). Her crew survived.
Smiling Morn	United Kingdom	World War I: The fishing vessel was scuttled in the North Sea east of Coquet Island by SM UB-39 (Imperial German Navy). Her crew survived.
Twiddler	United Kingdom	World War I: The drifter was scuttled in the North Sea east of Coquet Island by SM UB-39 (Imperial German Navy). Her crew survived.
Vera	Sweden	World War I: The brigantine was sunk in the Baltic Sea off the Finngrundet Lightship (Sweden) by SM UB-20 (Imperial German Navy). Her crew survived. Germany later conceded that the sinking was unjust, and paid compensation.
Vermland	Sweden	World War I: The coaster was sunk in the Baltic Sea off the Finngrundet Lightship (Sweden) by SM UB-20 (Imperial German Navy). Her crew survived.
Zeeland	Netherlands	World War I: The cargo ship was shelled and sunk in the North Sea 7 nautical miles (13 km) east of Sunderland, County Durham (55°00′N 1°17′W) by SM UB-39 (Imperial German Navy). Her crew survived.
Hudiksvall	Sweden	World War I: The coaster was sunk in the Baltic Sea 30 nautical miles (56 km) off Rauma, Finland by SM UB-36 (Imperial German Navy). Her crew survived.

== 3 August ==
List of shipwrecks: 3 August 1916
Ship	State	Description
Badger	United Kingdom	World War I: The coaster was shelled and sunk in the English Channel 30 nautical miles (56 km) south west of St. Catherine's Point, Isle of Wight by SM UB-18 (Imperial German Navy).
HMS Clacton	Royal Navy	World War I: The auxiliary minesweeper was torpedoed and sunk in the Aegean Sea (40°46′N 23°53′E) by SM U-73 (Imperial German Navy) with the loss of five crew.
Fortuna	United Kingdom	World War I: The schooner was scuttled in the English Channel 15 nautical miles (28 km) south south west of Portland Bill, Dorset by SM UB-18 (Imperial German Navy). Her crew survived.
Jacqueline	France	World War I: The schooner was sunk in the English Channel 14 nautical miles (26 km) north of Cap de la Hague, Manche (49°57′N 2°00′W) by SM UB-18 (Imperial German Navy). Her crew survived.
Lucania	United Kingdom	World War I: The drifter was scuttled in the North Sea 4 nautical miles (7.4 km) east by south of Dunstanburgh, Northumberland by SM UB-39 (Imperial German Navy). Her crew survived.
Merchant Prince	United Kingdom	World War I: The trawler was scuttled in the North Sea 9 nautical miles (17 km) east by south of Dunstanburgh by SM UB-39 (Imperial German Navy). Her crew survived.
Nancy	United Kingdom	The schooner sank after Avance (Sweden) collided with her in the North Sea off Great Yarmouth, Norfolk.
HMT Rooke	Royal Navy	The naval trawler was lost on this date.
Sphene	United Kingdom	World War I: The coaster was scuttled in the English Channel 26 nautical miles (48 km) south west of St. Catherine's Point (50°04′N 1°48′W) by SM UB-18 (Imperial German Navy). Her crew survived.
Trawler Prince	United Kingdom	World War I: The trawler was scuttled in the North Sea 12 nautical miles (22 km) south east of the Longstone Lighthouse, Northumberland by SM UB-39 (Imperial German Navy). Her crew survived.
Tricoupis	Greece	World War I: The cargo ship was sunk in the Mediterranean Sea off the Île du Planier, Bouches-du-Rhône, France (42°08′N 5°21′E) by SM U-35 (Imperial German Navy). Her crew survived.
Commerce	Sweden	World War I: The cargo ship, en route from Sundsvall to Leith was scuttled by a German U-boat off Hudiksvall in the northern Baltic Sea. Germany later paid compensation for the unjustly sinking of the ship.

== 4 August ==
List of shipwrecks: 4 August 1916
Ship	State	Description
Albert J. Stone	United States	The tug struck a rock in the Cape Cod Canal and sank near the mouth of the Seaconnet River.
Demaris	United Kingdom	World War I: The schooner was scuttled in the English Channel 20 nautical miles (37 km) north of Alderney, Channel Islands by SM UB-18 (Imperial German Navy). Her crew survived.
Ermenilda	United Kingdom	World War I: The schooner was scuttled in the English Channel 24 nautical miles (44 km) south south west of Portland Bill, Dorset by SM UB-18 (Imperial German Navy). Her crew survived.
Favonian	United Kingdom	World War I: The cargo ship was shelled and sunk in the Mediterranean Sea off the Île du Planier, Bouches-du-Rhône, France (42°57′N 5°07′E) by SM U-35 (Imperial German Navy). Her crew survived.
Jägersborg	Denmark	World War I: The cargo ship was scuttled in the North Sea 12 nautical miles (22 km) north east of the Longstone Lighthouse, Northumberland, United Kingdom by SM UB-39 (Imperial German Navy). Her crew survived.
Siena	Italy	World War I: The passenger ship was sunk in the Mediterranean Sea off the Île du Planier (42°55′N 5°10′E) by SM U-35 (Imperial German Navy).
Stamfordham	United Kingdom	World War I: The coaster was shelled and sunk in the North Sea 8 nautical miles (15 km) south of the Longstone Lighthouse by SM UB-39 (Imperial German Navy). Her crew survived.
Teti	Italy	World War I: The cargo ship was sunk in the Mediterranean Sea off the Île du Planier (43°10′N 4°25′E) by SM U-35 (Imperial German Navy). Her crew survived.
Tottenham	United Kingdom	World War I: The cargo ship was shelled and sunk in the Mediterranean Sea 22 nautical miles (41 km) south west of the Île du Planier (42°55′N 5°15′E) by SM U-35 (Imperial German Navy). Her crew survived.

== 5 August ==
List of shipwrecks: 5 August 1916
Ship	State	Description
Achilleus	Greece	World War I: The coaster was shelled and sunk in the Gulf of Lion (42°02′N 3°25′E) by SM U-35 (Imperial German Navy). Her crew survived.
Aranda	Norway	World War I: The cargo ship struck a mine placed by SM U-78 (Imperial German Navy) and was damaged in the North Channel (56°19′N 7°07′W) with the loss of two of her crew. She was towed into Lough Foyle where she sank.
Egyptian Prince	United Kingdom	World War I: The trawler was scuttled in the North Sea 12 nautical miles (22 km) south south east of the Longstone Lighthouse, Northumberland by SM UB-39 (Imperial German Navy). Her crew survived.
Mount Coniston	United Kingdom	World War I: The cargo ship was scuttled in the Mediterranean Sea 7 nautical miles (13 km) east by south of the Medes Islands, Spain by SM U-35 (Imperial German Navy). Her crew survived.
Spiral	United Kingdom	World War I: The cargo ship was scuttled in the English Channel 40 nautical miles (74 km) west south west of St. Catherine's Point, Isle of Wight by SM UB-18 (Imperial German Navy). Her crew survived.
St. Olive	United Kingdom	World War I: The trawler was scuttled in the North Sea 11 nautical miles (20 km) east of Coquet Island, Northumberland by SM UB-39 (Imperial German Navy). Her crew survived.

== 6 August ==
List of shipwrecks: 6 August 1916
Ship	State	Description
Libestad	Mexico	The cargo ship was wrecked at Cape San Antonio, Cuba.
Loch Lomond	United Kingdom	World War I: The fishing smack was shelled and sunk in the North Sea 18 nautical miles (33 km) east of Lowestoft, Suffolk by SM UB-29 (Imperial German Navy). Her crew survived.

== 7 August ==
List of shipwrecks: 7 August 1916
Ship	State	Description
Falcon	United Kingdom	The cargo ship caught fire and sank in the River Thames at Deptford, London. She was refloated the next day.
HMT John High	Royal Navy	World War I: The naval trawler struck a mine placed by SM U-75 (Imperial German Navy) and sank in the White Sea (67°34′N 41°19′E) with the loss of fourteen crew.
Newburn	United Kingdom	World War I: The cargo ship was sunk in the Mediterranean Sea 34 nautical miles (63 km) north north east of Dragonera, Spain by SM U-35 (Imperial German Navy). Her crew were rescued by Daisy (Denmark).
Tibor	France	The cargo ship caught fire and sank at Estaque, Bouches-du-Rhône.
Trident	United Kingdom	World War I: The cargo ship was torpedoed and sunk in the Mediterranean Sea 34 nautical miles (63 km) north north east of Dragonera by SM U-35 (Imperial German Navy). Her crew were rescued by Daisy (Denmark).

== 8 August ==
List of shipwrecks: 8 August 1916
Ship	State	Description
Imperial	United Kingdom	World War I: The cargo ship was shelled and sunk in the Mediterranean Sea 38 nautical miles (70 km) south west by west of the Île du Planier (42°43′N 4°30′E) by SM U-35 (Imperial German Navy). Her crew survived.
Speme	Italy	World War I: The barquentine was sunk in the Gulf of Lion by SM U-35 (Imperial German Navy).
Thore Hafte	Norway	The steamship struck a mine and sank in the Baltic Sea off Falsterbo, Sweden with the loss of a crew member. She was on a voyage from Stettin, Germany to Haugesund.
SM UB-44	Imperial German Navy	World War I: The Type UB II submarine departed Cattaro, Austria-Hungary for Hersingstand, Turkey. No further trace, lost with all 24 crew.

== 9 August ==
List of shipwrecks: 9 August 1916
Ship	State	Description
Antiope	United Kingdom	World War I: The cargo ship was shelled and sunk in the Mediterranean Sea 88 nautical miles (163 km) south west by west of Marseille, Bouches-du-Rhône, France (42°16′N 4°03′E) by SM U-35 (Imperial German Navy). Her crew survived.
HMS B10	Royal Navy	World War I: The B-class submarine was bombed and sunk at Venice, Italy by aircraft of the Austro-Hungarian Navy′s Royal Naval Air Corps.
Danevang	Denmark	World War I: The cargo ship was sunk in the North Sea 60 nautical miles (110 km) east of Tynemouth, Northumberland, United Kingdom (55°45′N 0°14′E) by SM UB-37 (Imperial German Navy). Her crew survived.
Ganekogorta Mendi	Spain	World War I: The cargo ship was sunk in the Mediterranean Sea 10 nautical miles (19 km) north east of Port-Vendres, Pyrénées-Orientales, France by SM U-35 (Imperial German Navy).
Henri Elisa	France	World War I: The coaster was sunk in the English Channel 20 nautical miles (37 km) east of Barfleur, Manche (49°46′N 0°46′W) by SM UB-18 (Imperial German Navy).
Lorenzo Donato	Italy	World War I: The schooner was sunk in the Mediterranean Sea 38°06′N 18°59′E) by SM U-73 (Imperial German Navy).
Sebastiano	Italy	World War I: The cargo ship was sunk in the Mediterranean Sea 40 nautical miles (74 km) east north east of Cape San Sebastian, Spain by SM U-35 (Imperial German Navy). Her crew survived.
Vassilaos	Greece	World War I: The sailing ship was sunk in the Mediterranean Sea by SM UB-46 (Imperial German Navy).

== 10 August ==
For the sinking of the Japanese cruiser Kasagi on this date, see the entry for 20 July 1916

List of shipwrecks: 10 August 1916
Ship	State	Description
Annette Marie	France	World War I: The schooner was sunk in the English Channel 10 nautical miles (19 km) south east of Barfleur, Manche (49°45′N 0°55′W) by SM UB-18 (Imperial German Navy). Her crew survived.
Credo	Norway	World War I: The coaster was sunk in the English Channel 8 nautical miles (15 km) east north east of Barfleur (49°55′N 0°55′W) by SM UB-18 (Imperial German Navy). Her crew were rescued by Robert (Denmark).
Glitra	Norway	The cargo ship ran aground at Huxter, Sandness, Shetland Islands, United Kingdom. She sank two days later.
Great Bear	United States	Carrying a crew of 21 and a cargo of 275 tons of general merchandise, the 367-gross register ton motor vessel was wrecked without loss of life on Pinnacle Rock (60°24′N 172°42′W) in the Bering Sea 7 nautical miles (13 km; 8.1 mi) off the west coast of St. Matthew Island.
HMT Irawadi	Royal Navy	World War I: The naval trawler was wrecked on the Tigani Rocks in the Mediterranean Sea.
Marie	France	World War I: The coaster was scuttled in the English Channel 12 nautical miles (22 km) east north east of Barfleur (49°45′N 0°55′W) by SM UB-18 (Imperial German Navy). Her crew were rescued by Robert (Denmark).
Saint Pierre	France	World War I: The sailing vessel was sunk in the English Channel 18 nautical miles (33 km) north north east of Barfleur by SM UB-18 (Imperial German Navy). Her crew survived.
San Bernando	United Kingdom	World War I: The cargo ship was scuttled in the North Sea 17 nautical miles (31 km) off the Longstone Lighthouse (55°30′N 1°00′W) by SM UB-19 (Imperial German Navy). Her crew were rescued by the trawler Magnus (United Kingdom).
Sora	Norway	World War I: The cargo ship was sunk in the English Channel north east of Barfleur (49°45′N 0°55′W) by SM UB-18 (Imperial German Navy). Her crew were rescued by Robert (Denmark).
Temmei Maru	Japan	World War I: The cargo ship was sunk in the Mediterranean Sea south of France (42°50′N 4°55′E) by SM U-35 (Imperial German Navy). Her crew survived.

== 11 August ==
List of shipwrecks: 11 August 1916
Ship	State	Description
Eleftheria	Greece	The troopship caught fire and was beached in the Aegean Sea off Skiathos with the loss of 40 lives.
F. Stobart	United Kingdom	World War I: The cargo ship struck a mine placed by SM UC-1 (Imperial German Navy) and sank in the North Sea off Aldeburgh, Suffolk (52°10′00″N 1°42′30″E) with the loss of four of her crew.
Inverdruie	Norway	World War I: The three-masted barque was sunk in the North Sea (56°46′N 2°46′E) by SM U-66 (Imperial German Navy). Her crew survived.
Kings Hill	United Kingdom	The schooner was in collision with another vessel in the Irish Sea 6 nautical miles (11 km) south west by west of the Caernarvon Bay Lightship (United Kingdom) and sank. Her crew were rescued.
SMS M27	Imperial German Navy	The Type 1915 minesweeper was sunk in a collision with Paranugua (flag unknown) in the Baltic Sea.
Pagasarri	Spain	World War I: The cargo ship was sunk in the Mediterranean Sea off Savona, Liguria, Italy (40°30′N 10°30′E) by SM U-35 (Imperial German Navy).
Rufus	Norway	World War I: The brig was sunk in the North Sea 60 nautical miles (110 km) east by north of Sunderland, County Durham, United Kingdom by SM UB-37 (Imperial German Navy). Her crew survived.
Skernahan	United Kingdom	The cargo ship collided with Yorkshire (United Kingdom) in the Irish Sea and sank. Her crew were rescued by Yorkshire.

== 12 August ==
List of shipwrecks: 12 August 1916
Ship	State	Description
Gina	Italy	World War I: The sailing ship, either a barque or a schooner, was sunk in the Mediterranean Sea 40 nautical miles (74 km) south of the Porquerolles (42°50′N 6°50′E) by SM U-35 (Imperial German Navy).
Kovda	Imperial Russian Navy	World War I: The despatch vessel struck a mine placed by SM U-75 (Imperial German Navy) and sank in the White Sea (67°35′N 41°22′E).
Nereus	Italy	World War I: The cargo ship was sunk in the Mediterranean Sea 4 nautical miles (7.4 km) off Cape Garoupe, Alpes-Maritimes, France (43°28′N 7°09′E) by SM U-35 (Imperial German Navy). Her crew survived.
Oriole	United States	The fishing schooner was sunk in a collision with a Norwegian ocean liner off Seal Island. Four crew killed.
Regina Pacis	Italy	World War I: The full-rigged ship was shelled and sunk in the Mediterranean Sea off Antibes, Alpes-Maritimes (43°27′N 7°33′E) by SM U-35 (Imperial German Navy).
Saint Gaetan	France	World War I: The brigantine was shelled and sunk in the Mediterranean Sea off Antibes (43°28′N 7°09′E) by SM U-35 (Imperial German Navy). Her crew survived.

== 13 August ==
List of shipwrecks: 13 August 1916
Ship	State	Description
Balmoral	Italy	World War I: The barque was sunk in the Mediterranean Sea off Porto Maurizio, Liguria by SM U-35 (Imperial German Navy).
Eurasia	Italy	World War I: The full-rigged ship was sunk in the Mediterranean Sea south of Savona, Liguria by SM U-35 (Imperial German Navy).
Francesco Saverio D	Italy	World War I: The brigantine was sunk in the Mediterranean Sea south west of Genoa, Liguria by SM U-35 (Imperial German Navy).
Fremad	Norway	World War I: The sailing vessel was sunk in the North Sea 50 nautical miles (93 km) east of Hartlepool, County Durham, United Kingdom by SM UB-37 (Imperial German Navy). Her crew survived.
Ivar	Denmark	World War I: The cargo ship was sunk in the Mediterranean Sea 30 nautical miles (56 km) south east of Capo Mele, Liguria by SM U-35 (Imperial German Navy). Her crew survived.
HMS Lassoo	Royal Navy	World War I: The Laforey-class destroyer was torpedoed and sunk in the North Sea off the Maas Lightship (Netherlands) (52°03′N 3°39′E) by SM UB-10 (Imperial German Navy) with the loss of six of her 77 crew.
Pepita	Sweden	World War I: The brig was sunk in the North Sea 25 nautical miles (46 km) off the Longstone Lighthouse, Northumberland, United Kingdom by SM UB-37 (Imperial German Navy). Her crew survived.
Respit	Norway	World War I: The barque was sunk in the North Sea (54°48′N 1°15′E) by SM UB-37 (Imperial German Navy). Her crew survived.

== 14 August ==
List of shipwrecks: 14 August 1916
Ship	State	Description
Emilia	Italy	World War I: The three-masted schooner was sunk in the Mediterranean Sea off Cape Corse, Corsica, France by SM U-35 (Imperial German Navy). Her crew survived.
Francesca	Italy	World War I: The brigantine was sunk in the Mediterranean Sea north of Cape Corse by SM U-35 (Imperial German Navy).
Henriette B.	Italy	World War I: The brigantine was sunk of Cape Corse by SM U-35 (Imperial German Navy).
Ida	Italy	World War I: The three-masted schooner was sunk in the Mediterranean Sea off Cape Corse by SM U-35 (Imperial German Navy). Her crew survived.
Lavinia	Italy	World War I: The brigantine was sunk in the Mediterranean Sea off Cape Corse by SM U-35 (Imperial German Navy).
Louis B.	Italy	World War I: The schooner was sunk in the Mediterranean Sea off Cape Corse by SM U-35 (Imperial German Navy).
HMT Neath Castle	Royal Navy	The naval trawler collided with a Dutch merchant ship and sank off the Orkney Islands.
Pantellaria	Italy	World War I: The vessel was torpedoed and sunk in the Mediterranean Sea 40 nautical miles (74 km) off Taranto, Apulia (39°55′N 17°15′E) by SM U-4 (Austro-Hungarian Navy).
Pausania	Italy	World War I: The sailing vessel was sunk in the Mediterranean Sea north east of Cape Corse by SM U-35 (Imperial German Navy).
HMS Remembrance	Royal Navy	World War I: The Q-ship was sunk in the Aegean Sea north of Paros, Greece by SM U-38 (Imperial German Navy). Her crew survived.
Rosario	Italy	World War I: The brigantine was sunk in the Mediterranean Sea east of Cape Corse by SM U-35 (Imperial German Navy).
S. Francesco Di Paola S.	Italy	World War I: The sailing vessel was sunk in the Mediterranean Sea off Cape Corse by SM U-35 (Imperial German Navy).
San Giovanni Batista	Italy	World War I: The cargo ship was sunk in the Mediterranean Sea east of Cape Corse by SM U-35 (Imperial German Navy). Her crew survived.
S. Giuseppe Patriarca	Italy	World War I: The sailing vessel was sunk in the Mediterranean Sea north east of Cape Corse by SM U-35 (Imperial German Navy).

== 15 August ==
List of shipwrecks: 15 August 1916
Ship	State	Description
Augusta	Italy	World War I: The cargo ship was sunk in the Mediterranean Sea 45 nautical miles (83 km) off Cape Figari, Sardinia by SM U-35 (Imperial German Navy).
Candida Altieri	Italy	World War I: The sailing vessel was sunk in the Mediterranean Sea east of Corsica by SM U-35 (Imperial German Navy).
HMS E4 and HMS E41	Royal Navy	The E-class submarines collided in the North Sea off Harwich, Essex. Both vessels sank but were later salvaged, repaired and returned to service.
Phillip Feeney	United States	The barge sank at the dock of the Pawtucket Gas Company, Pawtucket, Rhode Island.
Topeka	United States	The steamer was sunk in a collision with Christopher (United States) in fog in the Detroit River off Sandwich, Ontario in 30–40 feet (9.1–12.2 m) of water. Wreck later removed. The crew were rescued by Christopher.
SMS V162	Imperial German Navy	World War I: The S138-class destroyer struck a mine and sank in the Baltic Sea.
Vergine di Pompei	Italy	World War I: The brigantine was sunk in the Mediterranean Sea east of Corsica (41°30′N 10°05′E) by SM U-35 (Imperial German Navy).

== 16 August ==
List of shipwrecks: 16 August 1916
Ship	State	Description
Admiral Clarke	United States	1916 Texas hurricane: The cargo ship foundered in the Caribbean Sea off Cape San Antonio, Cuba in a hurricane. 20 of her crew died, 6 were rescued by Pama (or Tanna) (Sweden).
Agnes W	United States	The 8-gross register ton, 37.8-foot (11.5 m) fishing vessel was crushed by ice and lost in Lynn Canal in Southeast Alaska. Her crew of five survived.
Madre	Italy	World War I: The barque was sunk in the Mediterranean Sea off Sardinia (38°20′N 11°10′E) by SM U-35 (Imperial German Navy).
Pup #1	United States	The 24-gross register ton scow was crushed by ice and lost at Chena in the Territory of Alaska.

== 17 August ==
List of shipwrecks: 17 August 1916
Ship	State	Description
Pilot Boy	United States	1916 Texas hurricane: The cargo ship started breaking up then broke in two and sank in the Gulf of Mexico off Port Aransas, Texas in a hurricane. Six of her crew died.
Stampalia	Italy	World War I: The passenger ship was sunk in the Mediterranean Sea 30 nautical miles (56 km) south of Cape Matapan, Greece (36°40′N 22°10′E) by SM UB-47 (Imperial German Navy).
Swedish Prince	United Kingdom	World War I: The cargo ship was shelled sunk in the Mediterranean Sea off Pantellaria, Italy (36°54′N 11°42′E) by SM U-35 (Imperial German Navy) with the loss of a crew member. Three of the survivors were taken as prisoners of war.
HMY Zaida	Royal Navy	World War I: The naval yacht sank in the Gulf of Alexandretta after striking a French mine.

== 18 August ==
List of shipwrecks: 18 August 1916
Ship	State	Description
Erix	Italy	World War I: The coaster was sunk in the Malta Channel (36°09′N 15°49′E) by SM U-35 (Imperial German Navy).

== 19 August ==
List of shipwrecks: 19 August 1916
Ship	State	Description
Dea	Italy	World War I: The brigantine was sunk in the Strait of Sicily by SM U-38 (Imperial German Navy).
Mary Hendry	United Kingdom	The schooner was wrecked at Burgeo, Newfoundland. Her crew were rescued.
HMS Nottingham	Royal Navy	World War I: Action of 19 August 1916: The Town-class cruiser was torpedoed and sunk in the North Sea (55°34′N 0°12′E by SM U-52 (Imperial German Navy) with the loss of 38 of her 433 crew.

== 20 August ==
List of shipwrecks: 20 August 1916
Ship	State	Description
Dragoon	United Kingdom	World War I: The fishing smack was scuttled in the North Sea 36 nautical miles (67 km) north east by north of Cromer, Norfolk by SM UC-10 (Imperial German Navy). Her crew survived.
HMS Falmouth	Royal Navy	World War I: Action of 19 August 1916: The Town-class cruiser, which had been torpedoed and damaged the previous day by SM U-66 (Imperial German Navy), was torpedoed and sunk in the North Sea (53°58′56″N 0°4′30″W) off Flamborough Head, Yorkshire by SM U-63 (Imperial German Navy). with the loss of eleven of her 433 crew.

== 21 August ==
List of shipwrecks: 21 August 1916
Ship	State	Description
Dobrovolets	Imperial Russian Navy	World War I: The Emir Bukharsky-class destroyer struck a mine and sank in the Irben Strait.
Maria	Italy	World War I: The barquentine was sunk in the Mediterranean Sea east of Sicily (37°04′N 16°51′E by SM U-34 (Imperial German Navy).
Saronic	United States	The cargo ship sprang a leak in Lake Erie and was beached at Cleveland, Ohio. She was subsequently destroyed by fire.
SM UC-10	Imperial German Navy	World War I: The Type UC I submarine was torpedoed and sunk in the North Sea (52°02′N 3°54′E) by HMS E54 (Royal Navy) with the loss of all eighteen crew.
Baltia	Sweden	World War I: The cargo ship, en route from Söderhamn to Zaandam, struck a mine in the North Sea and sank. One of the crew was killed by the explosion.

== 22 August ==
List of shipwrecks: 22 August 1916
Ship	State	Description
HMS E16	Royal Navy	World War I: The E-class submarine struck a mine and sank in the Heligoland Bight with the loss of all 30 crew.
San Pietro	Italy	World War I: The fishing vessel was sunk in the Strait of Sicily by SM U-34 (Imperial German Navy).

== 23 August ==
List of shipwrecks: 23 August 1916
Ship	State	Description
HMT Birch	Royal Navy	World War I: The naval trawler struck a mine placed by SM UC-1 (Imperial German Navy) and sank in the North Sea off Great Yarmouth, Norfolk (52°42′N 2°11′E) with the loss of three of her crew.
Cossack	Norway	The cargo ship foundered in the Atlantic Ocean. Thirteen crew were rescued.
Elios	Italy	World War I: The brigantine was sunk in the Mediterranean Sea off the south coast of France by SM U-38 (Imperial German Navy).
Maria Brizzolari	Italy	World War I: The brigantine was sunk in the Mediterranean Sea off the south coast of France by SM U-38 (Imperial German Navy).
Quebra	United Kingdom	The cargo ship struck rocks off the Blasket Islands, County Kerry and sank with the loss of three of her 37 crew.
Tanina	Italy	World War I: The brigantine was sunk in the Mediterranean Sea off the south coast of France by SM U-38 (Imperial German Navy).

== 24 August ==
List of shipwrecks: 24 August 1916
Ship	State	Description
Alix	Italy	World War I: The brigantine was scuttled in the Mediterranean Sea off the coast of Algeria (37°51′N 8°18′E) by SM U-34 (Imperial German Navy).
Angelina	Italy	World War I: The brigantine was scuttled in the Mediterranean Sea 53 nautical miles (98 km) north north east of Bône, Algeria (37°48′N 8°16′E) by SM U-34 (Imperial German Navy).
Gustave Zédé	French Navy	The Gustave Zédé-class submarine sank in the Adriatic Sea due to an explosion in her batteries with the loss of four of her 40 crew. She was subsequently refloated, repaired and returned to service.
Hump	United Kingdom	The cargo ship collided with Argyle (United Kingdom) in the St. Lawrence River and sank. Her crew were rescued.
Isdalen	Norway	World War I: The cargo ship was sunk in the Mediterranean Sea (42°22′N 5°06′E) by SM U-38 (Imperial German Navy). Her crew survived.
Liègeoise	Belgium	World War I: The cargo ship was captured in the Mediterranean Sea (42°12′N 5°25′E) by U-38 (Imperial German Navy). She was shelled and sunk.

== 25 August ==
List of shipwrecks: 24 August 1916
Ship	State	Description
HMS Duke of Albany	Royal Navy	World War I: The armed boarding steamer was torpedoed and sunk in the North Sea 20 nautical miles (37 km) east of the Pentland Skerries, Orkney Islands (58°44′N 2°28′W) by SM UB-27 (Imperial German Navy) with the loss of 24 crew.
Equinox	United Kingdom	World War I: The trawler struck a mine and sank in the North Sea 39 nautical miles (72 km) south east by east of the Humber Lightship (United Kingdom) with the loss of nine of her crew.
Leandros	Greece	World War I: The cargo ship was sunk in the Mediterranean Sea off Cape Creux (41°52′N 4°07′E) by SM U-38 (Imperial German Navy). Her crew survived.
Nostra Senora del Carmine	Italy	World War I: The full-rigged ship was sunk in the Mediterranean Sea 40 nautical miles (74 km) off Cape Creux by SM U-38 (Imperial German Navy).
Socoa	France	World War I: The cargo ship was torpedoed and sunk in the Mediterranean Sea 30 nautical miles (56 km) north east of Cape Carbon, Algeria (36°58′N 5°20′E) by SM U-34 (Imperial German Navy).

== 26 August ==
List of shipwrecks: 26 August 1916
Ship	State	Description
Atlantico	United Kingdom	World War I: The cargo ship was scuttled in the Mediterranean Sea 15 nautical miles (28 km) south east of Formentera, Spain by SM U-38 (Imperial German Navy). Her crew survived.
Ballooie	United Kingdom	The cargo ship collided with Polzeath (United Kingdom) in the Seine at Rouen, Seine-Inférieure, France and was beached.
HMT Rosie	Royal Navy	The naval trawler was lost on this date.

== 27 August ==
List of shipwrecks: 27 August 1916
Ship	State	Description
Gayret-i Vataniye	Ottoman Navy	World War I: The S165-class destroyer was wrecked off Varna and scuttled to prevent capture.
HMT Ocean Plough	Royal Navy	World War I: The naval trawler struck a naval mine placed by SM UC-1 (Imperial German Navy) and sank in the North Sea off Lowestoft, Suffolk (52°27′00″N 1°52′30″E) with the loss of five of her crew.
Torridon	Italy	World War I: The full-rigged ship was sunk in the Mediterranean Sea 30 nautical miles (56 km) south east of Ibiza (38°27′N 1°56′E) by gunfire from SM U-34 (Imperial German Navy).
Unnamed barge	Austria-Hungary	World War I: The fuel-loaded barge was hit by a torpedo and exploded when the torpedo boats Rândunica, Bujorescu and Catinca (all Romanian Naval Forces) attacked Austro-Hungarian warships near the Bulgarian city of Rutschek.

== 28 August ==
List of shipwrecks: 28 August 1916
Ship	State	Description
Gorgona	Italy	World War I: The barque was sunk in the Mediterranean Sea 20 nautical miles (37 km) north east of Cape Palos, Spain (37°50′N 0°24′W) by SM U-34 (Imperial German Navy).
Saratoga	United Kingdom	The schooner sprang a leak in the Atlantic Ocean. She was set afire and abandoned by her crew, who were rescued by Llangorse (United Kingdom).

== 29 August ==
List of shipwrecks: 29 August 1916
Ship	State	Description
Antigoon	Belgium	World War I: cargo ship was torpedoed and sunk in the Mediterranean Sea 30 nautical miles (56 km) north of Dragonera, Spain by SM U-38 (Imperial German Navy). Her crew survived.
Fede	Italy	World War I: The barque was sunk in the Mediterranean Sea off the east coast of Spain (37°25′N 0°20′W) by SM U-34 (Imperial German Navy).
François Joseph	France	World War I: The brigantine was sunk in the Mediterranean Sea off the east coast of Spain by SM U-38 (Imperial German Navy).
Leviathan	United States	The steam lighter sank at the Government Wharf in Boston, Massachusetts.
Lucia Porter	United States	The schooner sprang a leak and was abandoned in the Atlantic Ocean (approximately 40°N 42°W). Her crew were rescued.
Stella del Mare	Italy	World War I: The full-rigged ship was sunk in the Mediterranean Sea 25 nautical miles (46 km) north of Mallorca, Spain by SM U-38 (Imperial German Navy). Her crew survived.
USS Memphis	United States Navy	USS Memphis Atlantic Hurricane number 8: The United States Navy Tennessee-class armored cruiser was wrecked when struck in rapid succession by three large waves of up to 70 feet (21 m) in height while at anchor in the harbor at Santo Domingo, Dominican Republic, suffering 40 dead and 204 badly injured. A number of her crew were killed when her launch was capsized by the waves. Equipment and guns were salvaged in 1917. The wreck was sold for scrap in 1922.
Sazanami Maru	Imperial Japanese Navy	The decommissioned miscellaneous service vessel, formerly the destroyer Sazanami (Imperial Japanese Navy) was sunk as a target in the Pacific Ocean off Tateyama, Japan. Her wreck was sold for scrap on 9 January 1917.

== 30 August ==
List of shipwrecks: 30 August 1916
Ship	State	Description
Audace	Regia Marina	The Audace-class destroyer collided with the steamer Brasile (Italy), a member of the convoy she was escorting, and sank in the Ionian Sea off Capo Colonna, Italy.
Nostra Signora Della Guardia	Italy	World War I: The full-rigged ship was sunk in the Mediterranean Sea 30 nautical miles (56 km) off Cape San Antonio, Spain by SM U-38 (Imperial German Navy).
Tongariro	United Kingdom	The cargo liner struck the Bull Rock, off Portland Island, New Zealand and sank.
Wellamo	Finland	World War I: The passenger ship was sunk in the Baltic Sea 9 nautical miles (17 km) off the Tankar Lighthouse (64°01′N 22°37′E) by SM U-47 (Imperial German Navy).

== 31 August ==
List of shipwrecks: 31 August 1916
Ship	State	Description
Bacchus	France	World War I: The cargo ship was sunk in the Mediterranean Sea 20 nautical miles (37 km) north of Cape Cherchell, Algeria by SM U-38 (Imperial German Navy).
Duart	United Kingdom	World War I: The cargo ship was shelled and sunk in the Mediterranean Sea 60 nautical miles (110 km) north by east of Cape Cherchell (37°39′N 2°05′E) by SM U-38 (Imperial German Navy). Her crew survived.
Nostra Signora Assunta	Italy	World War I: The barque was sunk in the Mediterranean Sea 30 nautical miles (56 km) north east of Cape Palos, Spain (39°09′N 0°47′E) by SM U-34 (Imperial German Navy).
Piero Maroncelli	Italy	World War I: The cargo ship was sunk in the Mediterranean Sea 55 nautical miles (102 km) north west of Cape Caxine, Algeria by SM U-38 (Imperial German Navy).
Quinto	Italy	World War I: The barque was sunk in the Mediterranean Sea 35 nautical miles (65 km) off Cape San Antonio (39°21′N 0°28′E) by SM U-34 (Imperial German Navy).
Santa Maria	Italy	World War I: The barque was sunk in the Mediterranean Sea 30 nautical miles (56 km) of Cape San Antonio, Spain (39°14′N 0°48′E) by SM U-34 (Imperial German Navy).
Tevere	Regia Marina	World War I: The cargo ship was sunk in the Black Sea off Poti, Russia by SM UB-45 (Imperial German Navy).
HMT Tuberose	Royal Navy	World War I: The naval trawler struck a mine placed by SM UC-1 (Imperial German Navy) and sank in the North Sea off Lowestoft, Suffolk (52°22′N 1°48′E) with the loss of eight of her crew.
Tunge	Norway	The cargo ship sprang a leak and sank at Le Havre, Seine-Inférieure, France. Her crew were rescued.

== Unknown date ==
List of shipwrecks: Unknown date 1916
Ship	State	Description
Andrew J. Stone	United States	The ocean-going tug sank off Sakonnet Point sometime in August. Raised on 9 December and towed into the Sakonnet River off Fogland Point.
Anna	Sweden	World War I: The sailing vessel was torpedoed and sunk in the Baltic Sea by an Imperial German Navy submarine. Her crew were rescued by Pitea (Sweden).
D L Co. No. VII	United States	The 72-ton scow was wrecked at the Bering River (60°11′N 144°15′W) on the south-central coast of the Territory of Alaska.
Ivanhoe	United Kingdom	World War I: The Thames barge was sunk in the English Channel by an Imperial German Navy submarine.
