= German submarine U-39 =

U-39 may refer to one of the following German submarines:

- SM U-39, was a Type U 31 submarine launched in 1914 and that served in the First World War until interned in Spain on 18 May 1918; surrendered to France on 22 March 1919
  - During the First World War, Germany also had these submarines with similar names:
    - SM UB-39, a Type UB II submarine launched in 1916 and sunk on 7 May 1917
    - SM UC-39, a Type UC II submarine launched in 1916 and sunk 8 February 1917
- German submarine U-39 (1938), was a Type IX submarine and the first U-Boat to be sunk during the Second World War on 14 September 1939.
