= Planier Light =

Lighthouse off the coast of Marseille, France

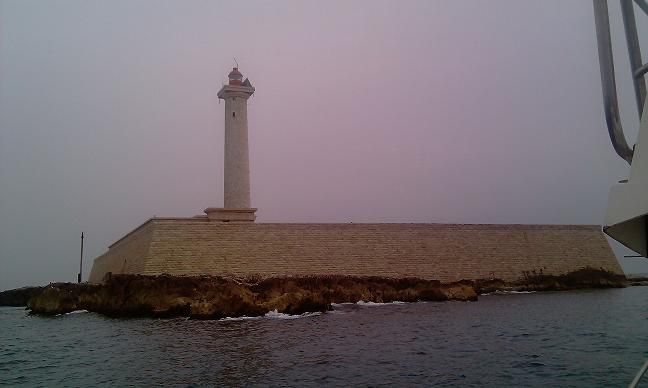
- Planier Light, 2010
- Location: Marseille, France
- Coordinates: 43.19865°N 5.23084°E

Tower
- Constructed: 1326 (first); 1824 (second); 1876 (third)
- Construction: stone tower
- Automated: 1986
- Height: 66.37 metres (217.7 ft) (current); 9 metres (30 ft) (first); 36 metres (118 ft) (second); 59 metres (194 ft) (third)
- Shape: cylindrical tower with balcony and lantern
- Markings: unpainted tower, red lantern
- Power source: solar power
- Heritage: classified historical monument

Light
- First lit: 1959 (current)
- Focal height: 223 feet (68 m)
- Lens: 920 mm (original), 500 mm (current)
- Range: 23 nautical miles (43 km; 26 mi)
- Characteristic: Fl W. 5s

Planier Light (French: Phare de Planier) is an active lighthouse on the small Île de Planier (Planier island), 13 kilometres (8.1 mi) from Marseille, Bouches-du-Rhône, France. At a height of 216 feet (66 m) it is the twelfth-tallest "traditional lighthouse" in the world.

The island is only accessible by boat, and both the site and the tower are closed to the public.

== History ==
The first tower was built in the location in 1320 by Robert d'Anjou.

In 1774 it was replaced by a circular stone tower at a height of either 20 metres (66 ft), 39 feet (12 m), or 9 metres (30 ft), 13 metres (43 ft) above sea level tall. It was 5.85 metres (19.2 ft) in diameter, equipped with 14 oil lamps, burning vegetable oil. It was operated by two teams of two keepers alternating each month.

The design of a second lighthouse started February 15, 1823, by engineer Garella. It was approved November 17, 1823 and construction started at February 9, 1824, but terminated on September 23, 1825. It was later continued by a new contractor called Melchioni, and the new light was lit on March 1, 1829. The tower was a cylindrical stone tower on a square base, 36 metres (118 ft) tall, 40 metres (130 ft) above sea level, rising from a square dwelling. The light characteristic used was a long white every 30s, and the lens was a 920mm lens. Vegetable oil was used until 1873 when it was replaced with mineral oil.

On February 17, 1876, construction of a new tower began by a contractor called Mendeville. Works were interrupted in October 1878 and terminated on May 21, 1879. A second auction was presented on September 18, 1879, and the tower was completed in July 1881. On December 1, 1881, the new light was moved to the new tower. This third tower was a cylindrical stone tower, either 62 metres (203 ft), or 59 metres (194 ft) (63 metres (207 ft) above sea level) tall. The light was electrical with 300mm lens, and the characteristic used was three white flashes, separated by a red glow until 1902 when it was replaced by the current white flash every 5 seconds. In 1902 mercury bearings were installed.

In August 1944 during World War II, all towers were destroyed. A temporary provisional light was set in 1945 on a metal Metal pylon, 205 feet (62 m) tall. This light served until the construction of the current lighthouse, which was lit on August 25, 1959. The current tower was designed by architects Arbus and Crillon. Three drafts were rejected by the Lighthouse Service, causing a delay in the construction.

The current structures include one story stone crew quarters.

The current light characteristic is one white flash every five seconds (Fl.W. 5s). The light is partially obscured.

== See also ==
- List of tallest lighthouses in the world
- List of lighthouses in France
