= SM UB-39 =

German watercraft

Coordinates: 50°20′N 1°20′W

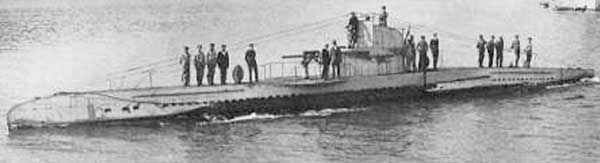
- SM UB-45 a U-boat similar to UB-39

History

German Empire
- Name: UB-39
- Ordered: 22 July 1915
- Builder: Blohm & Voss, Hamburg
- Cost: 1,152,000 German Papiermark
- Yard number: 263
- Launched: 29 December 1915
- Completed: 28 April 1916
- Commissioned: 29 April 1916
- Fate: Sunk by mine 15 May 1917

General characteristics
- Class & type: Type UB II submarine
- Displacement: 274 t (270 long tons) surfaced; 303 t (298 long tons) submerged
- Length: 36.90 m (121 ft 1 in) o/a; 27.90 m (91 ft 6 in) pressure hull
- Beam: 4.37 m (14 ft 4 in) o/a; 3.85 m (12 ft 8 in) pressure hull
- Draught: 3.69 m (12 ft 1 in)
- Propulsion: 1 × propeller shaft; 2 × 6-cylinder diesel engine, 284 PS (209 kW; 280 bhp); 2 × electric motor, 280 PS (210 kW; 280 shp)
- Speed: 9.15 knots (16.95 km/h; 10.53 mph) surfaced; 5.81 knots (10.76 km/h; 6.69 mph) submerged
- Range: 6,450 nmi (11,950 km; 7,420 mi) at 5 knots (9.3 km/h; 5.8 mph) surfaced; 45 nmi (83 km; 52 mi) at 4 knots (7.4 km/h; 4.6 mph) submerged
- Test depth: 50 m (160 ft)
- Complement: 2 officers, 21 men
- Armament: 2 × 50 cm (19.7 in) torpedo tubes; 4 × torpedoes (later 6); 1 × 8.8 cm (3.5 in) Uk L/30 deck gun
- Notes: 42-second diving time

Service record
- Part of: Flandern Flotilla; 21 June 1916 – 7 May 1917
- Commanders: Oblt.z.S. Werner Fürbringer; 29 April – 7 November 1916; Oblt.z.S. Heinrich Küstner; 8 November 1916 – 7 May 1917
- Operations: 14 patrols
- Victories: 93 merchant ships sunk (89,998 GRT); 4 merchant ships damaged (7,215 GRT)

SM UB-39 (Note: "SM" stands for "Seiner Majestät" (English: His Majesty's) and combined with the U for Unterseeboot would be translated as His Majesty's Submarine.) was a German Type UB II submarine or U-boat in the German Imperial Navy (German: Kaiserliche Marine) during World War I.

== Design ==
A Type UB II submarine, UB-39 had a displacement of 274 tonnes (270 long tons) when at the surface and 303 tonnes (298 long tons) while submerged. She had a total length of 36.90 m (121 ft 1 in), a beam of 4.37 m (14 ft 4 in), and a draught of 3.69 m (12 ft 1 in). The submarine was powered by two Körting six-cylinder diesel engines producing a total 284 metric horsepower (280 shp; 209 kW), two Siemens-Schuckert electric motors producing 280 metric horsepower (210 kW; 280 shp), and one propeller shaft. She was capable of operating at depths of up to 50 metres (160 ft).

The submarine had a maximum surface speed of 9.15 knots (16.95 km/h; 10.53 mph) and a maximum submerged speed of 5.81 knots (10.76 km/h; 6.69 mph). When submerged, she could operate for 45 nautical miles (83 km; 52 mi) at 4 knots (7.4 km/h; 4.6 mph); when surfaced, she could travel 6,450 nautical miles (11,950 km; 7,420 mi) at 5 knots (9.3 km/h; 5.8 mph). UB-39 was fitted with two 50 centimetres (20 in) torpedo tubes, four torpedoes, and one 8.8 cm (3.5 in) Uk L/30 deck gun. She had a complement of twenty-one crew members and two officers and a 42-second dive time.

== Construction and career ==
The U-boat was ordered on 22 July 1915 and launched on 28 December 1915. She was commissioned into the German Imperial Navy on 29 April 1916 as SM UB-38.

The submarine sank 93 ships in 14 patrols. UB-39 struck a mine and sank in the English Channel on 17 May 1917.

== Summary of raiding history ==
Date	Name	Nationality	Tonnage (Note: Tonnages are in gross register tons)	Fate
10 July 1916	Staffa	United Kingdom	176	Sunk
13 July 1916	Dalhousie	United Kingdom	89	Sunk
13 July 1916	Florence	United Kingdom	149	Sunk
13 July 1916	Mary Ann	United Kingdom	5	Sunk
13 July 1916	Success	United Kingdom	6	Sunk
14 July 1916	Ben Aden	United Kingdom	176	Sunk
14 July 1916	Bute	United Kingdom	176	Sunk
14 July 1916	Girls Friend	United Kingdom	55	Sunk
14 July 1916	Langley Castle	United Kingdom	93	Sunk
14 July 1916	Recorder	United Kingdom	149	Sunk
1 August 1916	Braconash	United Kingdom	192	Sunk
1 August 1916	Helvetia	United Kingdom	167	Sunk
1 August 1916	King James	United Kingdom	163	Sunk
1 August 1916	Rhodesia	United Kingdom	110	Sunk
1 August 1916	Tatiana	United Kingdom	285	Sunk
1 August 1916	Zeeland	Netherlands	1,292	Sunk
2 August 1916	Olympia	United Kingdom	221	Sunk
2 August 1916	Smiling Morn	United Kingdom	126	Sunk
2 August 1916	Twiddler	United Kingdom	99	Sunk
3 August 1916	Trawler Prince	United Kingdom	126	Sunk
3 August 1916	Lucania	United Kingdom	92	Sunk
3 August 1916	Merchant Prince	United Kingdom	130	Sunk
3 August 1916	Destro	United Kingdom	859	Damaged
4 August 1916	Jägersborg	Denmark	1,797	Sunk
4 August 1916	Stamfordham	United Kingdom	921	Sunk
5 August 1916	Egyptian Prince	United Kingdom	129	Sunk
5 August 1916	St. Olive	United Kingdom	202	Sunk
6 September 1916	Ancona	United Kingdom	1,168	Damaged
6 September 1916	Strathtay	United Kingdom	4,428	Sunk
6 September 1916	Tagus	United Kingdom	937	Sunk
7 September 1916	Marguerite	France	102	Sunk
7 September 1916	Alcyon	France	163	Sunk
7 September 1916	Heathdene	United Kingdom	3,541	Sunk
7 September 1916	Messicano	Kingdom of Italy	4,065	Sunk
8 September 1916	Jeune Union	France	267	Sunk
8 September 1916	Lyderhorn	Norway	939	Sunk
8 September 1916	Olazarri	Spain	2,585	Sunk
9 September 1916	Europe	France	356	Sunk
9 September 1916	Pronto	Norway	1,411	Sunk
10 September 1916	Lexie	United Kingdom	3,778	Sunk
11 September 1916	Fredavore	Norway	1,577	Sunk
20 October 1916	Midland	United Kingdom	4,247	Sunk
20 October 1916	Secundo	Norway	1,512	Sunk
21 October 1916	Hebe	Denmark	775	Sunk
21 October 1916	Helga	Denmark	1,182	Sunk
22 October 1916	Alix	Norway	1,584	Sunk
13 November 1916	Corinth	United Kingdom	3,669	Sunk
28 November 1916	Alert	United Kingdom	289	Sunk
28 November 1916	Alison	United Kingdom	286	Sunk
28 November 1916	Ramsgarth	United Kingdom	1,553	Sunk
29 November 1916	Grace	United Kingdom	135	Sunk
29 November 1916	Saint Philippe	France	3,419	Sunk
30 November 1916	Nagata Maru	Japan	3,521	Sunk
30 November 1916	Harald	Norway	1,083	Sunk
1 December 1916	Jeanne D’arc	France	205	Sunk
2 December 1916	Palacine	Canada	3,286	Sunk
3 December 1916	Primevere	France	143	Sunk
6 December 1916	Amicitia	Norway	1,111	Sunk
7 December 1916	Bravo	Spain	1,214	Sunk
8 December 1916	Rakiura	Norway	3,569	Sunk
8 December 1916	Rollo	Denmark	2,290	Sunk
8 December 1916	Saga	Norway	433	Sunk
28 December 1916	Rouen	France	1,656	Damaged
1 January 1917	Holly Branch	United Kingdom	3,568	Sunk
1 January 1917	Leon	France	652	Sunk
2 January 1917	Carlyle	United Kingdom	466	Sunk
3 January 1917	Columbia	France	34	Sunk
3 January 1917	Diamant De La Couronne I	France	36	Sunk
3 January 1917	Diamant De La Couronne II	France	34	Sunk
3 January 1917	Formidable	France	26	Sunk
3 January 1917	Helgøy	Norway	1,806	Sunk
3 January 1917	Honneur Et Devouement	France	26	Sunk
3 January 1917	Jeanne Mathilde	France	60	Sunk
3 January 1917	La Pensee	France	30	Sunk
3 January 1917	Marie Henriette	France	25	Sunk
3 January 1917	Moderne	France	38	Sunk
3 January 1917	Pere Montfort	France	13	Sunk
3 January 1917	Pierre Le Grand	France	42	Sunk
3 January 1917	Richelieu	France	25	Sunk
3 January 1917	Saint Jacques	France	34	Sunk
3 January 1917	Saint Paul II	France	30	Sunk
3 January 1917	Petit Emile	France	60	Sunk
4 January 1917	Gabrielle Francois	France	37	Sunk
5 January 1917	Allie	United Kingdom	1,127	Sunk
5 January 1917	Markland	Norway	1,627	Sunk
4 February 1917	Dauntless	United Kingdom	2,157	Sunk
5 February 1917	Yvonne	France	123	Sunk
10 February 1917	Rancagua	France	2,729	Sunk
23 March 1917	Achille Adam	United Kingdom	460	Sunk
23 March 1917	Clan Macmillan	United Kingdom	4,525	Sunk
23 March 1917	Exchange	United Kingdom	279	Sunk
23 March 1917	O. A. Knudsen	Norway	3,532	Damaged
1 April 1917	Silvia	United Kingdom	164	Sunk
5 April 1917	Dicto	Norway	2,363	Sunk
6 April 1917	La Tour D’Auvergne	France	188	Sunk
6 April 1917	Perce Neige	France	141	Sunk
9 April 1917	Saint Maudez	France	292	Sunk

== Bibliography ==
- Bendert, Harald (2000). Die UB-Boote der Kaiserlichen Marine, 1914-1918. Einsätze, Erfolge, Schicksal (in German). Hamburg: Verlag E.S. Mittler & Sohn GmbH. ISBN 3-8132-0713-7.
- Gröner, Erich; Jung, Dieter; Maass, Martin (1991). U-boats and Mine Warfare Vessels. German Warships 1815–1945. Vol. 2. Translated by Thomas, Keith; Magowan, Rachel. London: Conway Maritime Press. ISBN 0-85177-593-4.
- Rössler, Eberhard (1979). Die deutschen U-Boote und ihre Werften: eine Bilddokumentation über den deutschen U-Bootbau; in zwei Bänden (in German). Vol. I. Munich: Bernard & Graefe. ISBN 3-7637-5213-7.
