= SM UB-18 =

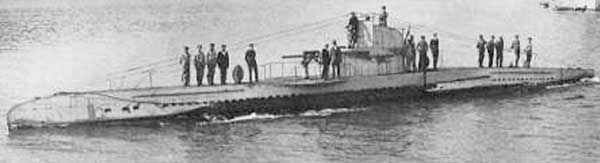
- SM UB-45, a U-boat similar to UB-18

History

German Empire
- Name: UB-18
- Ordered: 30 April 1915
- Builder: Blohm & Voss, Hamburg
- Yard number: 248
- Launched: 21 August 1915
- Completed: 10 December 1915
- Commissioned: 11 December 1915
- Fate: Rammed and sunk, 9 December 1917

General characteristics
- Class & type: Type UB II submarine
- Displacement: 263 t (259 long tons) surfaced; 292 t (287 long tons) submerged
- Length: 36.13 m (118 ft 6 in) o/a; 27.13 m (89 ft) pressure hull
- Beam: 4.36 m (14 ft 4 in) o/a; 3.85 m (13 ft) pressure hull
- Draught: 3.70 m (12 ft 2 in)
- Propulsion: 1 × propeller shaft; 2 × four-stroke 6-cylinder diesel engine, 284 PS (209 kW; 280 bhp); 2 × electric motor, 280 PS (210 kW; 280 shp)
- Speed: 9.15 knots (16.95 km/h; 10.53 mph) surfaced; 5.81 knots (10.76 km/h; 6.69 mph) submerged
- Range: 6,650 nmi (12,320 km; 7,650 mi) at 5 knots (9.3 km/h; 5.8 mph) surfaced; 45 nmi (83 km; 52 mi) at 4 knots (7.4 km/h; 4.6 mph) submerged
- Test depth: 50 m (160 ft)
- Complement: 2 officers, 21 men
- Armament: 2 × 50 cm (19.7 in) torpedo tubes; 4 × torpedoes (later 6); 1 × 5 cm SK L/40 gun
- Notes: 45-second diving time

Service record
- Part of: Flanders Flotilla; 16 February 1916 – 9 December 1917
- Commanders: Oblt.z.S. Franz Wäger; 11 December 1915 – 15 February 1916; Oblt.z.S. Otto Steinbrinck; 16 February – 27 October 1916; Oblt.z.S. Claus Lafrenz; 28 October 1916 – 7 July 1917; Oblt.z.S. Ulrich Meier; 8 July – 21 September 1917; Oblt.z.S. Georg Niemeyer; 22 September – 9 December 1917
- Operations: 31 patrols
- Victories: 126 merchant ships sunk (129,783 GRT + Unknown GRT); 1 warship sunk (725 tons); 1 auxiliary warship sunk (1,058 GRT); 3 merchant ships damaged (3,217 GRT); 2 auxiliary warships damaged (4,359 GRT)

SM UB-18 was a German Type UB II submarine or U-boat in the German Imperial Navy (German: Kaiserliche Marine) during World War I. The U-boat was ordered on 30 April 1915 and launched on 21 August 1915. She was commissioned into the German Imperial Navy on 11 December 1915 as SM UB-18. (Note: "SM" stands for "Seiner Majestät" (English: His Majesty's) and combined with the U for Unterseeboot would be translated as His Majesty's Submarine.) The submarine sank 128 ships in 31 patrols for a total of 130,841 GRT and 725 tons, making her the 17th most successful U-boat in both world wars. UB-18 was rammed by the trawler Ben Lawer and sunk in the English Channel at 49°17′N 5°47′W on 9 December 1917.

== Design ==
A Type UB II submarine, ‘’UB-18’’ had a displacement of 263 tonnes (259 long tons) when at the surface and 292 tonnes (287 long tons) while submerged. They had a length overall of 36.13 m (118 ft 6 in), a beam of 4.54 m (14 ft 11 in), and a draught of 3.70 m (12 ft 2 in). The submarine was powered by two Daimler six-cylinder four-stroke diesel engines each producing 142 metric horsepower (104 kW; 140 shp) (a total of 284 metric horsepower (209 kW; 280 shp)), two Siemens-Schuckert electric motors producing 280 metric horsepower (210 kW; 280 shp), and one propeller shaft. She had a dive time of 45 seconds and was capable of operating at a depth of 50 metres (160 ft).

The submarine had a maximum surface speed of 9.15 knots (16.95 km/h; 10.53 mph) and a submerged speed of 5.81 knots (10.76 km/h; 6.69 mph). When submerged, she could operate for 45 nautical miles (83 km; 52 mi) at 5 knots (9.3 km/h; 5.8 mph); when surfaced she could travel 6,650 nautical miles (12,320 km; 7,650 mi) at 5 knots (9.3 km/h; 5.8 mph). UB-18 was fitted with two 50 centimetres (20 in) torpedo tubes in the bow, four torpedoes, and one 5 cm (2.0 in) Tk L/40 deck gun. Her complement was twenty-three crew members.

== Service history ==
Oberleutnant zur See (Oblt.z.S.) Franz Wäger took command of UB-18 upon commissioning on 11 December 1915. Wäger handed over command to Oblt.z.S. Otto Steinbrinck, (Note: Steinbrinck was the most successful of the Flanders U-boat commanders. After the war he joined the Flick group and became a leading industrialist. In 1933 he joined the Freundeskreis Reichsführer SS. He was indicted in the Flick Trial at Nuremberg in 1947 and found guilty of membership in a criminal organisation.) who sailed her to Zeebrugge, arriving on 16 February, the first U-boat of the type to be based there.

=== 1st War Patrol ===
At the end of February 1916, UB-18 left Zeebrugge for the approaches to Le Havre. On 26 February she launched a torpedo hitting the French steamer SS Charbutier, whose sinking was not observed. The attack on the French auxiliary minesweeper Au Revoir was more successful, sinking the 20-year-old ship of 1,058 GRT, killing 18 crew members. UB-18 returned to base arriving there 29 February 1916.

=== 2nd War Patrol ===
On 4 March 1916 UB-18 provided flank cover for a German fleet sortie against the English east coast.

=== 3rd War Patrol ===
From 7–11 March 1916, UB-18 operated against Allied shipping off Boulogne and Le Havre. On 8 March, she sunk a British steamer, SS Harmatris, and the following day, a Norwegian freighter, the Silius, and a French steamer, SS Louisane, fell victims to UB-18's torpedoes.

=== 4th War Patrol ===
On 21 March 1916, UB-18 left Zeebrugge again for the Le Havre area, where she successfully attacked ships lying in the roads. Two ships, the British freighter SS Kelvinbank, and the Norwegian steamer SS Kannik were hit by torpedoes and sank. The two reloads did not show any hits. UB-18 returned to Zeebrugge, arriving on 29 March 1916. That day, the Flanders Flotilla was formed, and Steinbrinck was awarded the coveted Pour le Mérite order.

=== Loss ===
Sailing on her last patrol, she was seen off Start Point, Devon by SM U-84 on 4 December 1917, bound for the Western Approaches. Early on the morning of 9 December she inadvertently surfaced close to the trawler Ben Lawer, which was escorting a coal convoy. The trawler immediately rammed her just aft of the conning tower, sinking her; there were no survivors. The impact was substantial, with the Ben Lawer so badly damaged that she only just made port.

== Summary of raiding history ==
Date	Name	Nationality	Tonnage (Note: Merchant ship tonnages are in gross register tons. Military vessels are listed by tons displacement.)	Fate
26 February 1916	Au Revoir	French Navy	1,058	Sunk
8 March 1916	Harmatris	United Kingdom	4,863	Sunk
9 March 1916	Louisiane	France	5,109	Sunk
9 March 1916	Silius	Norway	1,559	Sunk
22 March 1916	Kelvinbank	United Kingdom	4,209	Sunk
23 March 1916	Kannik	Norway	2,397	Sunk
5 April 1916	Baus	Norway	1,287	Sunk
5 April 1916	Jeannette	France	160	Sunk
7 April 1916	Clyde	United Kingdom	204	Sunk
7 April 1916	Eemdijk	Netherlands	3,048	Damaged
25 April 1916	HMS E22	Royal Navy	725	Sunk
26 April 1916	Alfred	United Kingdom	24	Sunk
17 May 1916	Research	United Kingdom	44	Sunk
15 July 1916	Bertha	Norway	203	Sunk
15 July 1916	Dina	Netherlands	164	Sunk
17 July 1916	Gertrude	United Kingdom	57	Sunk
17 July 1916	Glance	United Kingdom	60	Sunk
17 July 1916	Loch Nevis	United Kingdom	58	Sunk
17 July 1916	Loch Tay	United Kingdom	44	Sunk
17 July 1916	V.M.G.	United Kingdom	59	Sunk
17 July 1916	Waverley	United Kingdom	59	Sunk
2 August 1916	G. C. Gradwell	United Kingdom	156	Sunk
2 August 1916	Margaret Sutton	United Kingdom	197	Sunk
2 August 1916	S.D.	United Kingdom	131	Sunk
3 August 1916	Badger	United Kingdom	89	Sunk
3 August 1916	Fortuna	United Kingdom	131	Sunk
3 August 1916	Ivo	United Kingdom	56	Damaged
3 August 1916	Jacques Cartier	France	259	Sunk
3 August 1916	Sphene	United Kingdom	740	Sunk
4 August 1916	Demaris	United Kingdom	98	Sunk
4 August 1916	Ermenilda	United Kingdom	94	Sunk
5 August 1916	Spiral	United Kingdom	1,342	Sunk
9 August 1916	Henri Elisa	France	822	Sunk
10 August 1916	Marie	France	784	Sunk
10 August 1916	Credo	Norway	728	Sunk
10 August 1916	Saint Pierre	France	149	Sunk
10 August 1916	Sora	Norway	1,052	Sunk
10 August 1916	Annette Marie	France	118	Sunk
3 September 1916	Netta	United Kingdom	370	Sunk
3 September 1916	Teesborough	United Kingdom	308	Sunk
5 September 1916	City of Ghent	United Kingdom	199	Sunk
5 September 1916	Marcel	Belgium	1,433	Sunk
8 September 1916	Gamen	Sweden	2,619	Sunk
9 September 1916	Georges Andre	France	229	Sunk
9 September 1916	Lodsen	Norway	1,247	Sunk
9 September 1916	Myosotis	France	64	Sunk
9 September 1916	HMS Carrigan Head	Royal Navy	4,201	Damaged
10 September 1916	Furu	Norway	2,029	Sunk
10 September 1916	Marechal De Villars	France	1,908	Sunk
10 September 1916	Polynesia	Norway	4,064	Sunk
11 September 1916	Assimacos	Greece	2,898	Sunk
11 September 1916	Kong Ring	Norway	1,611	Sunk
11 September 1916	Luis Vives	Spain	2,160	Sunk
12 September 1916	Antwerpen	Netherlands	7,955	Sunk
13 September 1916	Ariel	France	49	Sunk
13 September 1916	Hans Jensen	Denmark	1,824	Sunk
13 September 1916	J. N. Madvig	Denmark	1,762	Sunk
13 September 1916	Tolosa	Norway	1,833	Sunk
14 September 1916	Ethel	Norway	1,122	Sunk
20 October 1916	Cliburn	United Kingdom	440	Sunk
20 October 1916	The Duke	United Kingdom	376	Sunk
20 October 1916	The Marchioness	United Kingdom	553	Sunk
21 October 1916	Brizeux	France	2,197	Sunk
21 October 1916	Condor	France	740	Sunk
21 October 1916	Fulvio	Norway	309	Sunk
21 October 1916	Rabbi	Norway	878	Sunk
24 October 1916	Cannebiere	France	2,454	Sunk
26 October 1916	Pan	Norway	796	Sunk
23 November 1916	Hendrick	France	35	Sunk
24 November 1916	Øifjeld	Norway	1,988	Sunk
25 November 1916	Emlynverne	United Kingdom	544	Sunk
27 November 1916	Borø	Norway	819	Sunk
27 November 1916	Perra	Norway	1,682	Sunk
27 November 1916	Rhona	United Kingdom	640	Sunk
28 November 1916	Auguste Marie	France	63	Sunk
28 November 1916	Lucienne	Spain	1,046	Sunk
30 November 1916	Aud	Norway	1,102	Sunk
30 November 1916	Christabel	United Kingdom	175	Sunk
30 November 1916	E.L.G.	United Kingdom	25	Sunk
30 November 1916	Egholm	Denmark	1,348	Sunk
30 November 1916	Marie Marguerite	France	136	Sunk
30 November 1916	Njaal	Norway	718	Sunk
30 November 1916	Saint Ansbert	France	275	Sunk
1 December 1916	T. And A.C.	United Kingdom	23	Sunk
1 December 1916	Indiana	France	178	Sunk
1 December 1916	Saint Joseph	France	182	Sunk
2 December 1916	Skjoldulf	Norway	502	Sunk
3 December 1916	Mizpah	United Kingdom	57	Sunk
3 December 1916	Seeker	United Kingdom	74	Sunk
3 December 1916	Yrsa	Denmark	879	Sunk
31 December 1916	Eva	Norway	1,081	Sunk
31 December 1916	Flora	Norway	1,033	Sunk
2 January 1917	Bestik	Norway	2,185	Sunk
2 January 1917	Ellik	Norway	603	Sunk
4 January 1917	Næsborg	Denmark	1,547	Sunk
5 January 1917	Danevirke	Denmark	1,433	Sunk
1 February 1917	Wellhome	United Kingdom	113	Damaged
3 February 1917	Confiante	France	85	Sunk
3 February 1917	Goeland	France	305	Sunk
3 February 1917	Lars Kruse	Denmark	1,460	Sunk
3 February 1917	Sainte Marie	France	60	Sunk
4 February 1917	Cerera	Russian Empire	3,512	Sunk
28 February 1917	Harriet Williams	United Kingdom	157	Sunk
1 March 1917	Chatburn	United Kingdom	1,942	Sunk
12 March 1917	Topaz	United Kingdom	696	Sunk
15 March 1917	Adieu Va	France	64	Sunk
16 March 1917	Sir Joseph	United Kingdom	84	Sunk
17 March 1917	Marie Louise	France	291	Sunk
17 March 1917	Marie Louise	France	426	Sunk
18 March 1917	Marie Louise	France	33	Sunk
1 May 1917	C. A. Jaques	United Kingdom	2,105	Sunk
2 May 1917	Juno	United Kingdom	1,384	Sunk
2 May 1917	Tela	United Kingdom	7,226	Sunk
11 May 1917	Tarpeia	United Kingdom	538	Sunk
14 May 1917	Elizabeth Hampton	United Kingdom	108	Sunk
15 May 1917	Panaghi Lykiardopoulo	Greece	3,193	Sunk
3 June 1917	HMS Sarah Colebrooke	Royal Navy	158	Damaged
6 June 1917	Cornelia	Netherlands	170	Sunk
8 June 1917	Cariad	United Kingdom	38	Sunk
8 June 1917	Ocean's Pride	United Kingdom	42	Sunk
8 June 1917	Onward	United Kingdom	39	Sunk
8 June 1917	Torbay Lass	United Kingdom	38	Sunk
9 June 1917	Marjorie	United Kingdom	119	Sunk
5 July 1917	Bjerkø	Norway	1,871	Sunk
22 July 1917	Breda	Netherlands	257	Sunk
22 July 1917	Nereus	Netherlands	110	Sunk
24 July 1917	Oostzee	Netherlands	199	Sunk
24 July 1917	Montevideo 488	Uruguay	unknown	Sunk
25 July 1917	Janna	Netherlands	145	Sunk
25 July 1917	Spes Mea	Netherlands	75	Sunk
16 September 1917	Facto	Norway	2,372	Sunk
12 October 1917	Peebles	United Kingdom	4,284	Sunk
8 December 1917	Nonni	Russian Empire	4,105	Sunk

== Bibliography ==
- Gröner, Erich; Jung, Dieter; Maass, Martin (1991). U-boats and Mine Warfare Vessels. German Warships 1815–1945. Vol. 2. Translated by Thomas, Keith; Magowan, Rachel. London: Conway Maritime Press. ISBN 0-85177-593-4.
- Bendert, Harald (2000). Die UB-Boote der Kaiserlichen Marine, 1914-1918. Einsätze, Erfolge, Schicksal (in German). Hamburg: Verlag E.S. Mittler & Sohn GmbH. ISBN 3-8132-0713-7.
- Rössler, Eberhard (1979). Die deutschen U-Boote und ihre Werften: eine Bilddokumentation über den deutschen U-Bootbau; in zwei Bänden (in German). Vol. I. Munich: Bernard & Graefe. ISBN 3-7637-5213-7.
- Helgason, Guðmundur. "WWI U-boats: Most Successful U-boats". German and Austrian U-boats of World War I - Kaiserliche Marine - Uboat.net.
