= SM UB-44 =

German Type UB II submarine

History

German Empire
- Name: UB-44
- Ordered: 31 July 1915
- Builder: AG Weser, Bremen
- Yard number: 246
- Laid down: 3 September 1915
- Launched: 20 April 1916
- Commissioned: 11 May 1916
- Fate: Missing since 8 August 1916

General characteristics
- Class & type: Type UB II submarine
- Displacement: 272 t (268 long tons) surfaced; 305 t (300 long tons) submerged
- Length: 36.90 m (121 ft 1 in) o/a; 27.90 m (91 ft 6 in) pressure hull
- Beam: 4.37 m (14 ft 4 in) o/a; 3.85 m (12 ft 8 in) pressure hull
- Draught: 3.68 m (12 ft 1 in)
- Propulsion: 1 × propeller shaft; 2 × 4-stroke 6-cylinder diesel engine, 284 PS (209 kW; 280 bhp); 2 × electric motor, 280 PS (210 kW; 280 shp)
- Speed: 8.82 knots (16.33 km/h; 10.15 mph) surfaced; 6.22 knots (11.52 km/h; 7.16 mph) submerged
- Range: 6,940 nmi (12,850 km; 7,990 mi) at 5 knots (9.3 km/h; 5.8 mph) surfaced; 45 nmi (83 km; 52 mi) at 4 knots (7.4 km/h; 4.6 mph)submerged
- Complement: 22
- Armament: 2 × 50 cm (19.7 in) bow torpedo tubes; 4 torpedoes; 1 × 8.8 cm (3.5 in) Uk L/30 deck gun

Service record
- Part of: Pola Flotilla; 11 May – 4 August 1916
- Commanders: Oblt. Franz Wäger; 11 May – 4 August 1916
- Operations: 2 patrols
- Victories: 1 merchant ship sunk (3,409 GRT)

SM UB-44 (Note: "SM" stands for "Seiner Majestät" (English: His Majesty's) and combined with the U for Unterseeboot would be translated as His Majesty's Submarine.) was a Type UB II submarine or U-boat for the German Imperial Navy (German: Kaiserliche Marine) during World War I. UB-44 operated in the Mediterranean and disappeared in August 1916.

UB-44 was ordered in July 1915 and was laid down at the AG Weser shipyard in Bremen in September. UB-44 was about 37 metres (121 ft 5 in) in length and displaced between 270 and 305 tonnes (266 and 300 long tons), depending on whether surfaced or submerged. She was equipped to carry a complement of four torpedoes for her two bow torpedo tubes and had an 5-centimeter (2.0 in) deck gun. As part of a group of six submarines selected for Mediterranean service, UB-44 was broken into railcar sized components and shipped to Pola where she was assembled and launched in April 1916 and commissioned in May.

In two patrols in her three-month career, UB-44 sank one ship of 3,409 gross register tons (GRT). In early August 1916, UB-44 departed from Cattaro for Hersingstand and never arrived. Her fate is officially unknown, but she may have been sunk by a torpedo boat near the island of Paxoi on 8 August.

== Design and construction ==
The German UB II design improved upon the design of the UB I boats, which had been ordered in September 1914. In service, the UB I boats were found to be too small and too slow. A major problem was that, because they had a single propeller shaft/engine combo, if either component failed, the U-boat became almost totally disabled. To rectify this flaw, the UB II boats featured twin propeller shafts and twin engines (one shaft for each engine), which also increased the U-boat's top speed. The new design also included more powerful batteries, larger torpedo tubes, and a deck gun. As a UB II boat, U-47 could also carry twice the torpedo load of her UB I counterparts, and nearly ten times as much fuel. To contain all of these changes the hull was larger, and the surface and submerged displacement was more than double that of the UB I boats.

The Imperial German Navy ordered UB-44 from AG Weser on 31 July 1915 as one of a series of six UB II boats (numbered from UB-42 to UB-47). UB-44 was 36.90 metres (121 ft 1 in) long and 4.37 metres (14 ft 4 in) abeam. She had a single hull with saddle tanks and had a draught of 3.68 metres (12 ft 1 in) when surfaced. She displaced 305 tonnes (300 long tons) while submerged but only 272 tonnes (268 long tons) on the surface.

The submarine was equipped with twin Daimler diesel engines and twin Siemens-Schuckert electric motors—for surfaced and submerged running, respectively—that drove one propeller shaft. UB-44 had a surface speed of up to 8.82 knots (16.33 km/h; 10.15 mph) and could go as fast as 6.22 knots (11.52 km/h; 7.16 mph) while underwater. The U-boat could carry up to 27 tonnes (27 long tons) of diesel fuel, giving her a range of 6,940 nautical miles (12,850 km; 7,990 mi) at 5 knots (9.3 km/h; 5.8 mph). Her electric motors and batteries provided a range of 45 nautical miles (83 km; 52 mi) at 4 knots (7.4 km/h; 4.6 mph) while submerged.

UB-44 was equipped with two 50-centimeter (19.7 in) bow torpedo tubes and could carry four torpedoes. The U-boat was also armed with one 8.8 cm (3.5 in) Uk L/30 deck gun.

UB-44 was laid down by AG Weser at its Bremen shipyard on 3 September 1915. As one of six U-boats selected for service in the Mediterranean while under construction, UB-44 was broken into railcar-sized components and shipped overland to the Austro-Hungarian port of Pola. Shipyard workers from Weser assembled the boat and her five sisters at Pola, where she was launched on 20 April 1916.

== Service career ==
SM UB-44 was commissioned into the German Imperial Navy on 11 May 1916 under the command of Oberleutnant zur See Franz Wäger. (Note: Wäger was in the Navy's April 1907 cadet class with 34 other future U-boat captains, including Werner Fürbringer, Heino von Heimburg, Hans Howaldt, Otto Steinbrinck, and Ralph Wenninger. See: Helgason, Guðmundur. "WWI Officer Crews: Crew 4/07". German and Austrian U-boats of World War I - Kaiserliche Marine - Uboat.net.) UB-44, Wäger's fourth U-boat command, was assigned to the Navy's Pola Flotilla (German: Deutsche U-Halbflotille Pola). Although the flotilla was based in Pola, the site of the main Austro-Hungarian Navy base, boats of the flotilla operated out of the Austro-Hungarian base at Cattaro which was located farther south and closer to the Mediterranean. German U-boats typically returned to Pola only for repairs.

On 30 June, Wäger and UB-44 achieved their only success when they sank the steamer Moeris 46 nautical miles (85 km; 53 mi) southeast of Cape Sidero, Crete. The 3,409-gross register ton British steamer was carrying a general cargo from Glasgow for Alexandria when she went down with the loss of three men.

After Germany's conquest of Romania (see Romania during World War I), the German Imperial Navy had sufficient fuel oil for submarines located in the Black Sea. UB-44 and three of her sister ships in the Pola Flotilla were ordered to Constantinople and, en route, had to navigate through the Dardanelles, which had been heavily mined by the Allies in the middle of 1916. (Note: The other three boats were UB-42, UB-45, and UB-46.) UB-44 departed from Cattaro on 8 August for Hersingstand (located on the Gallipoli peninsula) to pick up a pilot for the trip through the Dardanelles, but never arrived.

UB-44's fate is unknown. Two British post-war reports list UB-44 as falling victim to the Otranto Barrage on 30 July but, as author Dwight Messimer points out, German records record UB-44's departure from Cattaro nine days after that. Messimer reports that it is possible that UB-44 was sunk by the torpedo boat HMS 368 (probably the French TB368, based at Brindisi), which was reported by an Athenian newspaper as sinking a U-boat 6 nautical miles (11 km; 6.9 mi) on 8 August off Paxoi with a lance bomb.

== Summary of raiding history ==
| Date | Name | Nationality | Tonnage (Note: Tonnages are in gross register tons) | Fate |
|---|---|---|---|---|
| 30 June 1916 | Moeris | United Kingdom | 3,409 | Sunk |

== Bibliography ==
- Bendert, Harald (2000). Die UB-Boote der Kaiserlichen Marine, 1914-1918. Einsätze, Erfolge, Schicksal (in German). Hamburg: Verlag E.S. Mittler & Sohn GmbH. ISBN 3-8132-0713-7.
- Gröner, Erich; Jung, Dieter; Maass, Martin (1991). German Warships 1815–1945, U-boats and Mine Warfare Vessels. Vol. 2. Translated by Thomas, Keith; Magowan, Rachel. London: Conway Maritime Press. ISBN 0-85177-593-4.
- Rössler, Eberhard (1979). Die deutschen U-Boote und ihre Werften: eine Bilddokumentation über den deutschen U-Bootbau; in zwei Bänden (in German). Vol. I. Munich: Bernard & Graefe. ISBN 3-7637-5213-7.
- Gardiner, Robert; Gray, Randal, eds. (1985). Conway's All the World's Fighting Ships 1906–1921. Annapolis, Maryland: Naval Institute Press. ISBN 978-0-87021-907-8. OCLC 12119866.
- Halpern, Paul G. (1994). A Naval History of World War I. Annapolis, Maryland: Naval Institute Press. ISBN 978-0-87021-266-6. OCLC 28411665.
- Messimer, Dwight R. (2002). Verschollen: World War I U-boat losses. Annapolis, Maryland: Naval Institute Press. ISBN 978-1-55750-475-3. OCLC 231973419.
- Miller, David (2002). The Illustrated Directory of Submarines of the World. St. Paul, Minnesota: MBI Pub. Co. ISBN 978-0-7603-1345-9. OCLC 50208951.
- Tarrant, V. E. (1989). The U-Boat Offensive: 1914–1945. Annapolis, Maryland: Naval Institute Press. ISBN 978-0-87021-764-7. OCLC 20338385.
- Williamson, Gordon (2002). U-boats of the Kaiser's Navy. Oxford: Osprey. ISBN 978-1-84176-362-0. OCLC 48627495.
