= Small nucleolar RNA SNORD39 =

Small nucleolar RNA SNORD55/SNORD39
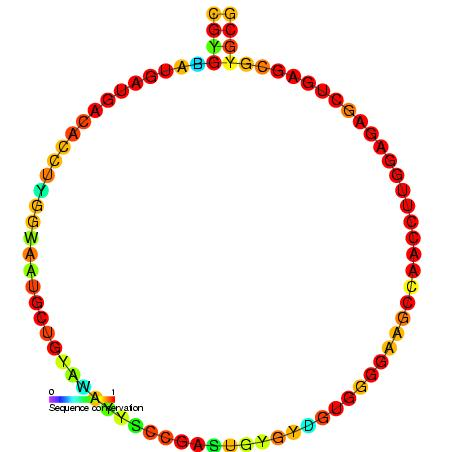
- Predicted secondary structure and sequence conservation of SNORD39

Identifiers
- Symbol: SNORD39
- Alt. Symbols: SNORD55; U39; U55
- Rfam: RF00157

Other data
- RNA type: Gene; snRNA; snoRNA; C/D-box
- Domain: Eukaryota
- GO: GO:0006396 GO:0005730
- SO: SO:0000593
- PDB structures: PDBe

In molecular biology, snoRNA U39 (also known as SNORD39) is a non-coding RNA (ncRNA) molecule which functions in the modification of other small nuclear RNAs (snRNAs). This type of modifying RNA is usually located in the nucleolus of the eukaryotic cell which is a major site of snRNA biogenesis. It is known as a small nucleolar RNA (snoRNA) and also often referred to as a guide RNA.

snoRNA U39 belongs to the C/D box class of snoRNAs which contain the conserved sequence motifs known as the C box (UGAUGA) and the D box (CUGA). Most of the members of the box C/D family function in directing site-specific 2'-O-methylation of substrate RNAs.

snoRNA U39 was cloned from HeLa cells and also independently characterised by bioinformatics prediction (and called U55 also known as SNORD55).

U39/U55 is predicted to guide the 2'O-ribose methylation of 28S ribosomal RNA (rRNA) C2791.
