= Pola Flotilla =

U-Boat Flotilla Pola
- Active: Raised June 1915, Dissolved Oct 1918
- Country: Germany
- Branch: Imperial German Navy
- Type: Attack submarine
- Role: Blockade; Commerce raiding Submarine warfare Unrestricted submarine warfare
- Size: Flotilla
- Base: Pola, Cattaro
- Nickname: Pola Flotilla

Commanders
- Notable commanders: Korvettenkapitän Kophamel

The Pola flotilla (U-Flottille Pola) was an Imperial German Navy (IGN) formation set up to implement the U-boat campaign against Allied shipping in the Mediterranean during the First World War in support of Germany's ally, the Austro-Hungarian Empire. It was formed in 1915 from the previously established U-Halbflottille Pola (German U-Boat Half-Flotilla, Pola). It operated mainly from an advanced base at Cattaro in the Adriatic, rather than from Pola.

The flotilla was made up of U-boats dispatched from German home ports, which travelled via the Atlantic and the Strait of Gibraltar, and coastal-type UB- and UC-boats, which were moved in segments by rail to Pola and assembled there at the See-Arsenal of the Austro-Hungarian Navy (kaiserliche und königliche Kriegsmarine: k.u.k.).

The Pola Flotilla had a maximum strength of 33 U-boats. Due to the favourable conditions for commerce raiding in the Mediterranean, they caused a disproportionately large number of Allied losses during the U-boat campaign. 3.6 million tons of the 14 million tons lost by the Allies were sunk in the Mediterranean. Eight of the IGN's top dozen U-boat aces served in the Pola flotilla, including Lothar von Arnauld de la Perière and Waldemar Kophamel.

In all, 45 U-boats served in the Pola Flotilla, eleven of which were lost operationally.

In June 1917, the unit was renamed U-Flottille Mittelmeer and in January 1918 it was divided into two separate Flotillas, the first based at Pola, and the second at Cattaro, while the commander, re-titled (Führer der Unterseeboote im Mittelmeer: U-Boat Leader, Mediterranean) assumed overall command of the forces there and at Constantinople.

In 1918 at the end of the campaign, the Pola Flotilla was evacuated to Germany. One of its boats, SM UB-50 sank the battleship HMS Britannia, the last British warship sunk during the U-Boat Campaign in World War I.

== Commanding officers ==
Date	Commander	Title
1915	Kapitänleutnant Adam; K/L Kophamel	(Chef) Commanding Officer (CO); Flotilla Commander
1916	Korvettenkapitän Waldemar Kophamel	(Chef) CO
1917	Kapitän zur See/Commodore Theodor Püllen	Leader Mediterranean /CO Pola (Combined command)
1918	KzS/Commodore Kurt Graßhoff; KK Otto Schultze; KK Rudolf Ackermann	Leader Mediterranean; CO I U-Flotilla; CO II U-Flotilla
