= Cedric Naylor =

U.K. Royal Navy officer (1891–1949)

Cedric Naylor DSO & Two Bars DSC & Bar
- Officers of the Penshurst in 1917. Naylor is second from the right
- Born: 12 June 1891; Wolverhampton, Staffordshire, England
- Died: 12 January 1949 (aged 57)
- Military career
- Allegiance: United Kingdom
- Branch: Royal Naval Reserve; Royal Navy
- Service years: 1914–1935, 1938–1945
- Rank: Captain
- Commands: HMS Penshurst (1917); HMS Polyanthus (1918–19); HMS Karanja (1941–42); HMS Salsette (1942–43); HMS Braganza (1943); HMS Montclare (1945)
- Conflicts: First World War; Second World War

Captain Cedric Naylor DSO & Two Bars DSC & Bar (12 June 1891 – 12 January 1949) was a Royal Navy officer of the First and Second World Wars. Naylor was a merchant seaman before joining the Royal Naval Reserve on the outbreak of the First World War. In November 1915 he was posted as first lieutenant to HMS Penshurst, a Q-ship, a warship disguised as a merchant vessel intended to fool German U-boats into surfacing so they could be sunk. Naylor received the Distinguished Service Cross for his part in the sinking of SM UB-19 on 30 November 1916 and a bar for further operations in February and March 1917. Naylor was granted temporary command of Penshurst after its captain was incapacitated in June and the next month damaged a submarine, for which he was awarded the Distinguished Service Order. Further distinguished service in the following months saw him receive a bar to the medal and a transfer to the Royal Navy. Naylor was hunting for SM U-110 on Christmas Eve 1917 and Penshurst was struck by a torpedo fired by the submarine. Despite suffering heavy damage Naylor remained onboard with two gun crews, hoping the U-boat would surface to finish off the ship. When U-110 surfaced it was hit twice and damaged before Penshurst sank. Naylor survived and was awarded a second bar to his DSO. He commanded the sloop Polyanthus for the remainder of the war.

In the inter-war years Naylor served on a variety of vessels from gunboats to battleships before joining the Royal Navy Submarine Service. He retired in 1935 but was asked to return briefly in 1938 as an instructor in anti-submarine warfare. Naylor became commandant of a Royal Air Force Volunteer Reserve station in 1939 but was recalled to the navy at the start of the Second World War. He was initially posted to the shore establishment HMS Calliope, but commanded the landing ship Karanja from 6 September 1941. He captained the ship during the 5 May 1942 landings in the Battle of Madagascar and was mentioned in dispatches for bravery. From 1942 he commanded a shore establishment in India, with the acting rank of captain. He returned to England in 1944 and was placed in charge of detention facilities at a naval establishment in Glasgow. After the war Naylor retired, becoming the administrator of a pensioner's residence in Chelsea.

== Early life and career ==
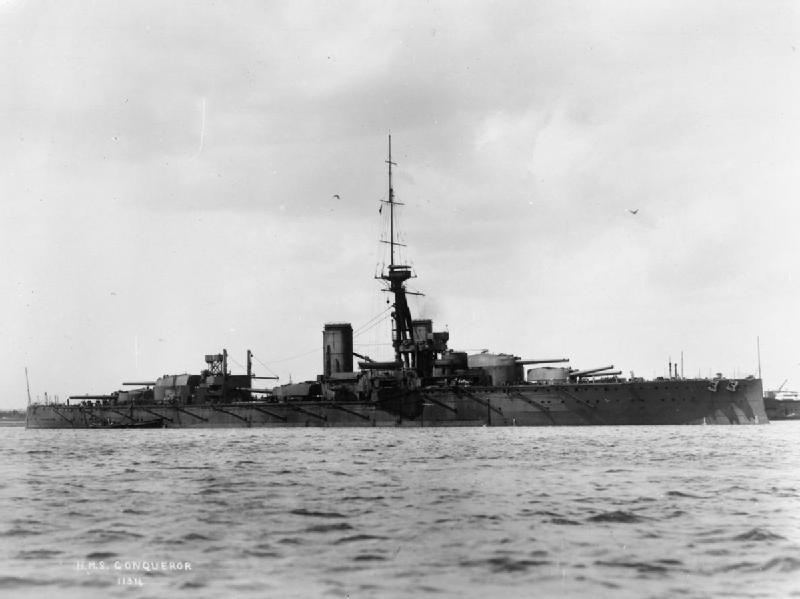
HMS Conqueror

Cedric Naylor was born in Wolverhampton, Staffordshire on 12 June 1891. He was the eldest son of William Naylor a Fulwood, Lancashire civil engineer with his own firm (Messrs. Naylor and Walker), who later became a Royal Air Force lieutenant. Cedric Naylor attended Preston Grammar School and Manchester Grammar School before joining the merchant marine. Naylor received his Board of Trade certificate in 1913 and joined F. Leyland and Co. on 17 July 1913. He made six voyages aboard the company's SS Alexandrian before being discharged on 8 December 1914, after the outbreak of the First World War.

Naylor applied to join the Royal Naval Reserve and was granted a commission in the temporary rank of sub-lieutenant on 25 December 1914. He received training at the shore establishment HMS Excellent in Portsmouth from December 1914 until 8 January 1915. He was aboard the Orion-class battleship Conqueror from 8 January until 26 August when he was appointed to the armed merchant cruiser Oropesa.

== Aboard the Penshurst ==
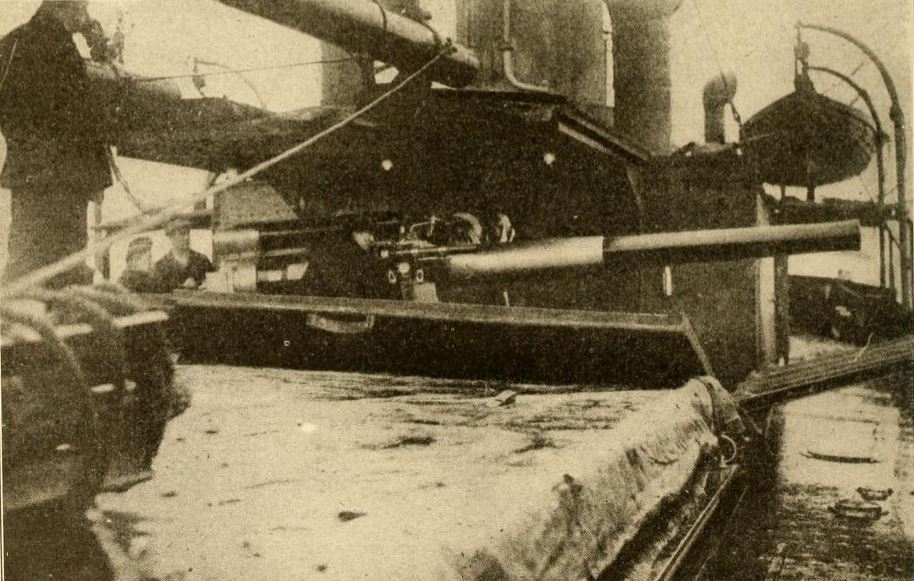
An uncovered gun on a Q-ship. These would normally be hidden by the hinged panels

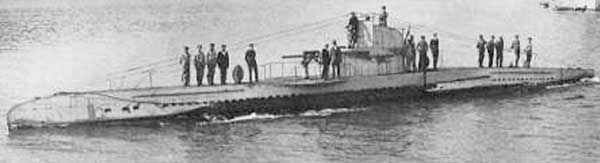
The U-boats UB-19 and UB-37, sunk by Penshurst while Naylor was aboard, were similar to the submarine shown in this photograph

Some of the crew of the Penshurst in a mixture of naval rig and Q-ship merchant seamen disguises

From 25 November 1915 Naylor served aboard HMS Penshurst, initially as first lieutenant under her captain, Commander FH Grenfell. The Penshurst was a Q-ship, a merchant vessel taken up by the Royal Navy and armed with concealed weaponry. The Q-ships would sail around disguised as merchants, hoping to entice an attack by a German submarine (known as a U-boat). The submarines would often surface to attack and sink merchants with the deck guns to save torpedoes, at which point the Q-ship would drop its disguise and attack the submarine. The Q-ship had a "panic party" of sailors disguised as merchant seamen who would feign abandoning ship to add to the deception. One of Penshurst's earliest successes was the sinking of a U-boat in January 1916, having survived a one-hour bombardment from the submarine's deck gun before dropping her disguise and returning fire at an opportune moment.

Another submarine (SM UB-19) was sighted at 7.30 am on 29 November 1916. The Penshurst's panic party was sent off in its boats but the submarine refused to approach closer than 3,000 yards (2,700 m) to the Q-ship. Grenfell ordered his crews to open fire, with caused the submarine to dive. Penshurst steamed to the location and dropped depth charges to no success. As the Penshurst's appearance was now known to the Germans, Grenfell had his vessel repainted overnight. The following day at 2 pm the submarine was spotted again, submerged. It was attacked by a seaplane from Portland Harbour to no effect. Grenfell signalled the aircraft to land and asked its pilot to guide him to the submerged submarine. The plane crashed while taking off and Grenfell launched boats to rescue its pilot. The U-boat took the opportunity to attack and, at a distance of 5,000 yards (4,600 m) surfaced and opened fire with its deck gun. The Penshurst feigned an attempt at fleeing and, being gained on by the submarine, sent off its panic party. The submarine approached the panic party, intending to secure papers or the capture the ship's master or the aircraft pilot. As the submarine passed to starboard Grenfell ordered the disguises dropped and opened fire at 200 yards (180 m) range. The second shot from his 12-pounder guns passed through the submarine's engine room, disabling her. She afterwards sank, with Penshurst rescuing the survivors. Grenfell received the Distinguished Service Order (DSO) for this action and Naylor the Distinguished Service Cross (DSC), though it was not gazetted until 16 February 1917.

Naylor was promoted to the temporary rank of lieutenant on 19 December 1916. In January 1917 the Penshurst sank the submarine SM UB-37 by gunfire. The submarine had surfaced and fired upon Penshurst for half an hour, killing two of her gun crews and wounding others. The survivors lay still until the U-boat showed its broadside when the disguise was dropped and a return fire opened. In February Penshurst damaged U-84, a particularly heavily armed U-boat. On 23 May 1917 Naylor received a bar to his DSC for his service in action against submarines on 20 and 22 February and 8 March. The London Gazette noted only that the award was made "for miscellaneous services" but his service record notes "his behaviour was admirable throughout the actions".

=== In command ===
From 28 June Naylor was in temporary command of Penshurst due to the illness of Grenfell. At 1.30 pm on 2 July Penshurst spotted a submarine at 6,000 yards (5,500 m) range. Naylor continued his course, pretending not to have seen the vessel. The submarine dived and approached to within 500 yards (460 m) of the port bow and fired a torpedo. Naylor adjusted course to avoid the torpedo, which passed 10 feet (3.0 m) from the vessel, and set off his panic party. The submarine surfaced at 3.35 pm some 5,000 yards (4,600 m) to the starboard quarter and opened fire for more than half an hour. Naylor ordered his gun crews to open fire at 4.14 pm, hitting the submarine sixteen times which he suspected caused serious damage. The submarine managed to escape, despite the arrival of three British destroyers. Naylor was commended for his "great coolness, excellent judgement and ability" in the action and was awarded the DSO.

On 19 August the Penshurst was proceeding south in the Western Approaches at around 47.45°N 8.35°W, making 8 knots (15 km/h). A submarine (UC-72) was spotted at a range of around 6 miles (9.7 km), making an attack approach. Based on the submarine's position and speed Naylor anticipated an attack would be launched a 5.45 pm, and a torpedo was observed at 5.44 pm. Naylor made a turn and the torpedo struck a glancing blow on No. 2 hold, below her bridge. Naylor's manoeuvring had avoided a strike on the ship's more vulnerable aft portion. Penshurst was partially flooded and her aft deck underwater, preventing the use of her guns positioned there. The disguise of the bridge 12-pounder was broken, exposing her as a warship, and the magazines flooded. With little hope of fooling the submarine Naylor decided not to feign abandoning ship and made efforts to save the vessel, which was listing heavily to starboard. Naylor requested assistance from British vessels at 5.58 pm. The submarine surfaced again at 6.05 at 6,000 yards (5,500 m) off the port quarter and Penshurst opened fire with her 3-pounder at the aft gunhouse. The submarine replied with her deck gun but did not close the distance. The submarine dived when the first British reinforcements arrived on the scene, the destroyer HMS Leonidas.

That night Naylor transferred the non-essential crew to Leonidas while the remainder worked to slow the flooding and save the ship. Penshurst managed to limp into Plymouth at 1.30 pm on 20 August. She had suffered no casualties in the action and was repaired at the dockyard, the opportunity being taken to upgrade one of her 12-pounders to a 4-inch gun.

Naylor was awarded his DSO personally by George V on 29 August for "services in action with enemy submarines". On 3 October 1917 Naylor was appointed the permanent Commander of Penshurst. Naylor was granted a permanent Royal Navy commission on 9 October in recognition of "distinguished service in action", he was granted seniority to match his reserve commission. Naylor was awarded a bar to his DSO on 2 November 1917.

=== Sinking ===
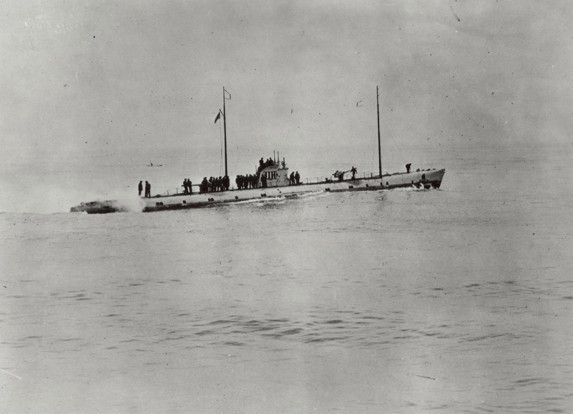
U-110, which sank the Penshurst, was similar to the submarine shown

On Christmas Eve 1917 the Penshurst was in the Irish Sea steaming at 8 knots (15 km/h) towards Smalls Lighthouse in response to the reported sighting of a German submarine. Naylor was on the bridge as captain, navigator and lookout, at 12.10 pm when submarine U-110 was spotted at approximately 51.31°N 5.33°W, some 5 miles (8.0 km) distant. The U-boat dived within two minutes. Penshurst zig-zagged and attempted to tempt the U-boat to surface so it could be attacked with gunfire. U-110 instead launched a torpedo at Penshurst at 1.31 pm from a distance of 300 yards (270 m). Naylor ordered a hard port turn but Penshurst was struck between her boilers and the engine room and began to sink by the stern.

The explosion caused Penshurst's aft 12-pounder gunhouse to collapse and unmasked her midships 4-inch guns, exposing her as a warship. Only the two 12-pounders at the bridge remained disguised. Despite this, Naylor ordered the crew to carry out the usual panic party drill. Because Penshurst was sinking he sent off the entire crew, except for himself and the crews of the two 12-pounders. The panic party went aboard the ship's sole surviving lifeboat and two rafts. These and Penshurst were closely inspected by the circling U-boat via periscope. The captain of U-110 was convinced that it was safe to surface and, at 2.40 pm, she came up at 250 yards (230 m) off Penshurst's port bow, opening fire with her deck gun. Penshurst dropped her remaining disguises and returned fire. By now her stern was very low in the water and the surviving guns could not depress low enough to bear on the U-boat, except when the pitch and roll of the vessel allowed it. Despite this, some six rounds were fired, with the second hitting the deck of the submarine and the fourth her conning tower, before U-110 dived again at around 3.47 pm.

U-110 surfaced again some 5 miles (8.0 km) to the starboard of Penshurst. A British P-class sloop appeared on the scene and the U-boat soon withdrew. Penshurst sank at 8.05 pm, having lost two crew members killed in action. The post-sinking inquiry found no fault in the behaviour of Naylor and his crew. Naylor was awarded a second bar to his DSO, in 22 February 1918, for his part in this action and one of his lieutenants, E. Hutchinson, was awarded the DSO. At the time it was thought that U-110 was sunk by a British patrol boat the following day, though she actually survived until March 1918 when she was sunk after being depth charged by the British Admiralty M-class destroyers Michael and Moresby. U-110 was the 11th U-boat engaged by the Penshurst, a record for a Q-ship; her career was also the longest of any Q-ship.

== Later life ==
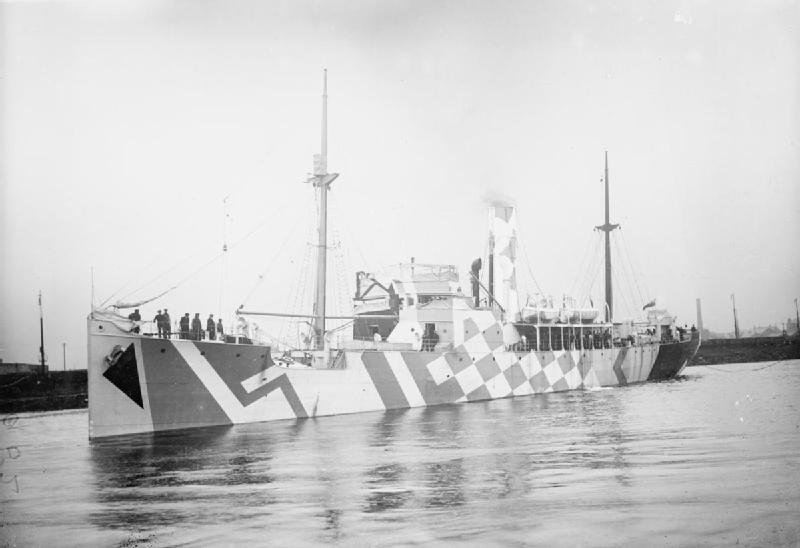
HMS Polyanthus as a Q-ship

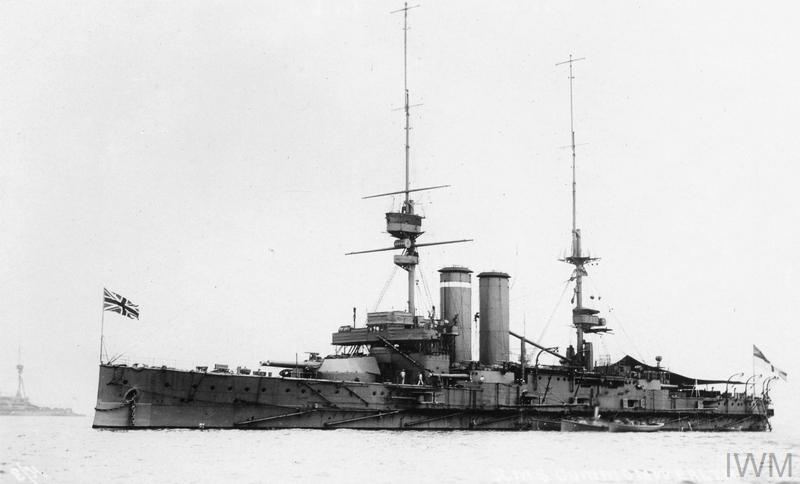
HMS Commonwealth

Naylor commanded the Aubrietia-class sloop Polyanthus from 26 January 1918. Naylor was married at the Congregational Church in Fulwood, Lancashire, on 6 July 1918 to Lillian Margaret Jenson from Preston. He was granted permission to wear his naval uniform for the ceremony. The Mayor of Preston marked the occasion by presenting Naylor with an engraved plate, commemorating his naval career. Naylor remained in the Navy after the war and on 8 August 1919 was transferred to the battleship Commonwealth. From 1 October 1920 he served at the navigation school HMS Dryad in Portsmouth. Naylor served on the Arabis-class sloops Godetia (19 August 1921 to 1 August 1923) and Wisteria (22 September 1924 to 13 April 1926), with the intervening period spent at the Royal Naval Barracks, Chatham (HMS Pembroke). He received promotion to lieutenant commander on 19 December 1924.

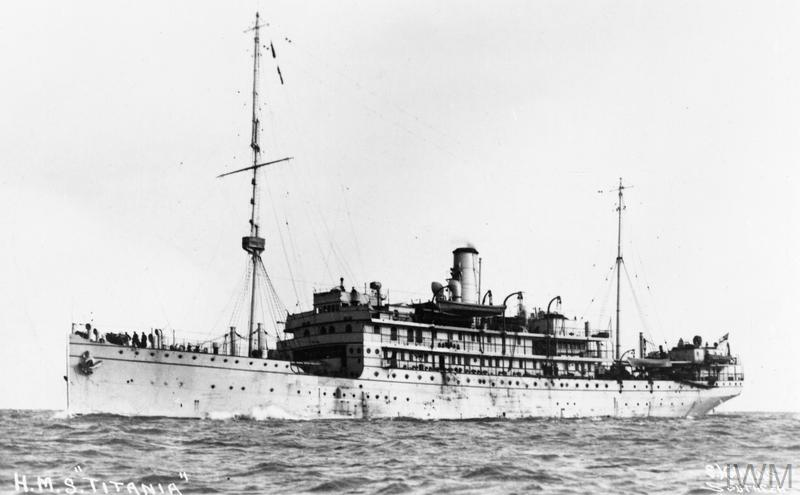
HMS Titania

Naylor was placed on half pay after leaving Wisteria but appointed to the battleship Emperor of India on 16 October 1926. He served on the Insect-class gunboat Scarab from 9 January 1928 and the submarine depot ship Titania from 17 November 1930. He joined the staff of the Royal Navy Submarine Service at HMS Dolphin in Gosport, Hampshire on 9 January 1933 and remained there until December 1934. He was placed on half pay on 3 June 1935 and afterwards requested retirement which was granted, with promotion to commander, on 12 June 1935.

Naylor was offered re-employment in 1938 as an additional instructor at the anti-submarine training establishment HMS Osprey in Portland, Dorset. He served there between 14 November and 3 December 1938. Naylor accepted an appointment as commandant of a Royal Air Force Volunteer Reserve station in 1939, though the Admiralty required him to remain available for recall in case of war.

Naylor was recalled to the navy soon after the start of the Second World War and returned to duty at Pembroke on 11 September 1939. He was posted to HMS Calliope, the Royal Naval Reserve base on the Tyne, on 27 November 1939. He served aboard the armed yacht Star of India for two days from 8 April 1941. Naylor commanded the landing ship Karanja from 6 September 1941 until 17 August 1942. This included the 5 May landings at the start of the Battle of Madagascar, for which he was mentioned in dispatches on 25 August 1942 "for bravery and enterprise while serving in H.M. Ships, Transports and Royal Fleet Auxiliaries in the successful operations which led to the surrender of the important base of Diego Suarez". Afterwards Naylor commanded HMS Salsette, a Royal Navy combined operations base at Lake Khadakwasla in India, with the acting rank of captain. He held this position until transferred to command the shore establishment HMS Braganza in 1943.

Naylor returned to England on 23 April 1944 and on 30 June was officer in charge of naval detention at HMS Spartiate, a Western Approaches Command shore establishment in Glasgow. He was in temporary command of the destroyer depot ship Montclare from 24 January 1945, returning to his former role at HMS Spartiate on 21 February. After the war's end he requested retirement on 5 October 1945. This was granted later that month together with promotion to the substantial rank of captain. After the war Naylor became an administrator of a pensioner's residence on Fulham Road, Chelsea. He was granted permission to wear his uniform at his son's wedding in 1948, and died on 12 January 1949.
