= Penshurst (disambiguation) =

Penshurst is a village in Kent, England

- Penshurst Place, a historic building in that village
- Penshurst Airfield, an airfield and RAF base in the early 20th century

Penshurst may also refer to:

- Penshurst, New South Wales, a suburb of Sydney, Australia
- Penshurst, Victoria, a town in Australia
- HMS Penshurst, a WWI Q-ship

== See also ==
- Penhurst, a village in East Sussex, England
