= List of shipwrecks in July 1916 =

The list of shipwrecks in July 1916 includes ships sunk, foundered, grounded, or otherwise lost during July 1916.

== 2 July ==
List of shipwrecks: 2 July 1916
| Ship | State | Description |
|---|---|---|
| Rockcliffe | Imperial Russian Navy | World War I: The transport ship was shelled and sunk in the Black Sea off Vardane by SM U-38 (Imperial German Navy). |

== 4 July ==
List of shipwrecks: 4 July 1916
| Ship | State | Description |
|---|---|---|
| Birkdale | United Kingdom | The barque caught fire at San Francisco, California, United States and was beached. |
| Emma Lord | United States | 1916 Gulf Coast hurricane: The schooner capsized and sank in a collision with the ocean-going barge Harry Morse (United States) in Mobile Bay during a hurricane. Her captain and five crew died. |
| Harry Morse | United States | 1916 Gulf Coast hurricane: The ocean-going barge was sunk in a collision with the schooner Emma Lord (United States) in Mobile Bay during a hurricane. |
| Queen Bee | United Kingdom | World War I: The fishing smack was scuttled in the North Sea 25 nautical miles (46 km) east by north of Whitby, Yorkshire by SM UB-23 (Imperial German Navy) with the loss of a crew member. |

== 5 July ==
List of shipwrecks: 5 July 1916
| Ship | State | Description |
|---|---|---|
| Ancenis | Norway | 1916 Gulf Coast hurricane: The barque either foundered and sank off of, or was wrecked on, Ship Island, Mississippi. |
| Annie Anderson | United Kingdom | World War I: The fishing smack was scuttled in the North Sea 16 nautical miles (30 km) east south east of the mouth of the River Tyne by SM UB-23 (Imperial German Navy). |
| Avio | Russia | 1916 Gulf Coast hurricane: The barque was wrecked on rock bulkhead at Pensacola, Florida. |
| Bradford C. French | United States | 1916 Gulf Coast hurricane: The schooner was abandoned 60 miles (97 km) east of South Pass, Mississippi (probably the South Pass of the Mississippi River). The crew survived. |
| Charles E. Cessna | United States | 1916 Gulf Coast hurricane: The river boat was driven ashore at Mobile, Alabama. Refloated, repaired, returned to service. |
| Ekonom | Russia | The schooner was abandoned in the Atlantic Ocean near the English Channel on 16 March 1916. The derelict was shelled, rammed and abandoned to sink by HMS Swiftsure (Royal Navy) 100 miles (160 km) north of Medeira on 5 July 1916. |
| Frieda | (Russian Empire) Grand Duchy of Finland | 1916 Gulf Coast hurricane: The barque was driven ashore at Choctaw Point, Mobile, Alabama. Refloated, repaired and returned to service. |
| Geertruida | Netherlands | World War I: The drifter, on her maiden voyage, was sunk in the North Sea (57°15′N 1°15′E) by SM U-45 (Imperial German Navy). Her crew survived. |
| Grace Harwar | (Russian Empire) Grand Duchy of Finland | 1916 Gulf Coast hurricane: The sailing ship was driven ashore at Choctaw Point, Mobile, Alabama. Refloated, repaired and returned to service. |
| Harry Morse | United States | 1916 Gulf Coast hurricane: The sailing barge foundered at Mobile, Alabama. |
| Jacob Luckenbach | United States | The cargo ship collided with Eddystone (Belgium) in the English Channel, 1 nautical mile (1.9 km) north of the Downs Lightship (United Kingdom) and sank. Her 31 crew were rescued. |
| Kathryn B. | United States | 1916 Gulf Coast hurricane: The schooner foundered at Pensacola, Florida. |
| Knias Obolensky | Russia | World War I: The paddle steamer was shelled and sunk at Tuapse by Yavûz Sultân Selîm (Ottoman Navy). |
| Mary G. Danzler | United States | 1916 Gulf Coast hurricane: The lumber schooner was wrecked near Ship Island Light, Mississippi. |
| Mount Carmel | Italy | 1916 Gulf Coast hurricane: The sailing ship sank with all hands off Pensacola, Florida. |
| Peep O' Day | United Kingdom | World War I: The drifter was scuttled in the North Sea 25 nautical miles (46 km) east north east of the mouth of the River Tyne (55°05′N 0°50′W) by SM UB-23 (Imperial German Navy). Her crew survived. |
| Soudan | United Kingdom | The dredge was scuttled in unknown location and circumstances. |
| Veleidosa | Chile | The schooner was wrecked at Caldera, Chile. |
| Wilhelmina | United States | The steamer was sunk in a collision in Guanabara Bay, Rio de Janeiro, Brazil. |

== 6 July ==
List of shipwrecks: 6 July 1916
| Ship | State | Description |
|---|---|---|
| HMS E26 | Royal Navy | The E-class submarine was lost in the North Sea with the loss of all 30 crew. |
| Girl Bessie | United Kingdom | World War I: The drifter was scuttled in the North Sea 23 nautical miles (43 km) south east by east of the mouth of the River Tyne by SM UB-23 (Imperial German Navy). Her crew survived. |
| SMS Margarethe | Imperial German Navy | The naval drifter/Vorpostenboot was lost on this date. |
| Nancy Hunnam | United Kingdom | World War I: The drifter was scuttled in the North Sea 24 nautical miles (44 km) east by south of the mouth of the River Tyne by SM UB-23 (Imperial German Navy). Her crew survived. |
| Newark Castle | United Kingdom | World War I: The drifter was scuttled in the North Sea 23 nautical miles (43 km) south east of the mouth of the River Tyne by SM UB-23 (Imperial German Navy). Her crew survived. |
| Petunia | United Kingdom | World War I: The drifter was scuttled in the North Sea 23 nautical miles (43 km) south east of the mouth of the River Tyne by SM UB-23 (Imperial German Navy). Her crew survived. |
| Watchful | United Kingdom | World War I: The drifter was scuttled in the North Sea 23 nautical miles (43 km) south east by south of the mouth of the River Tyne by SM UB-23 (Imperial German Navy). Her crew survived. |

== 7 July ==
List of shipwrecks: 7 July 1916
| Ship | State | Description |
|---|---|---|
| Gannet | United Kingdom | World War I: The cargo ship struck a mine placed by SM UC-6 (Imperial German Navy) and sank in the North Sea 5 nautical miles (9.3 km) east north east of the Shipwash Lightship (United Kingdom) (52°05′N 1°53′E) with the loss of eight of her crew. |

== 8 July ==
List of shipwrecks: 8 July 1916
| Ship | State | Description |
|---|---|---|
| Baro | United Kingdom | The cargo ship was run into by Diana VI (Nigeria) at Lagos, Nigeria and was beached. |
| Dorita | Germany | World War I: The 3,689-gross register ton steamer was sunk by the submarine Volk (Imperial Russian Navy) off Örnsköldsvik. |
| Mary Ann McCann | United States | The schooner went to pieces after being beached in the Seaconnet River near Newport, Rhode Island to prevent her sinking. |
| Vpered | Russia | World War I: The hospital ship was torpedoed and sunk in the Black Sea between Rizeh and Batum by the submarine SM U-38 (Imperial German Navy) with the loss of seven lives. |

== 9 July ==
List of shipwrecks: 9 July 1916
| Ship | State | Description |
|---|---|---|
| Ancenio | Norway | Hurricane Two: The barque was driven ashore at Gulfport, Mississippi, United States. |
| HMT Astrum Spei | Royal Navy | World War I: The naval trawler was shelled and sunk in the Adriatic Sea by SMS Novara (Austro-Hungarian Navy). Her crew were taken as prisoners of war. |
| HMT Clavis | Royal Navy | World War I: The naval trawler was shelled and sunk in the Adriatic Sea by SMS Novara (Austro-Hungarian Navy). |
| John C. Meyne | United States | Hurricane Two: The barquentine was driven ashore at Gulfport, Mississippi. |
| Mary G. Dantzler | United States | Hurricane Two: The schooner foundered between Ship Island and Cat Island, Mississippi. |
| Imberhorne | Russia | Hurricane Two: The cargo ship was driven ashore at Moss Point, Mississippi. |
| Margareta | Russia | Hurricane Two: The barque was driven ashore at Moss Point. |

== 10 July ==
List of shipwrecks: 10 July 1916
| Ship | State | Description |
|---|---|---|
| Florida | Imperial Russian Navy | World War I: The transport ship was sunk in the Black Sea off Sukhumi (43°05′N 40°52′E) by SM U-38 (Imperial German Navy). |
| Impetuoso | Regia Marina | World War I: The Indomito-class destroyer was torpedoed and sunk in the Strait of Otranto (40°10′N 18°50′E) by SM U-17 (Austro-Hungarian Navy). |
| Kara | United Kingdom | World War I: The cargo ship struck a mine and was damaged in the North Sea off Pakefield, Suffolk. She was declared a constructive total loss. |
| Staffa | United Kingdom | World War I: The trawler was scuttled in the North Sea 45 nautical miles (83 km) east by north of the mouth of the River Tyne by SM UB-39 (Imperial German Navy). Her crew survived. |

== 11 July ==
List of shipwrecks: 11 July 1916
| Ship | State | Description |
|---|---|---|
| Calypso | United Kingdom | World War I: The cargo ship was torpedoed and sunk in the North Sea off Listafjord, Norway by SM U-53 (Imperial German Navy) with the loss of all 30 crew. |
| HMT Era | Royal Navy | World War I: The naval trawler was shelled and sunk in the North Sea off Aberdeen (57°09′N 2°00′W) by SM U-69 (Imperial German Navy). Her crew survived and were taken as prisoners of war by SM U-52 (Imperial German Navy). |
| Inger | Norway | The barque ran aground on Langley Island, Saint-Pierre and Miquelon and was wrecked. |
| HMT Nellie Nutten | Royal Navy | World War I: The naval trawler was shelled and sunk in the North Sea off Aberdeen (57°06′N 0°58′E) by SM U-24 (Imperial German Navy) with the loss of two crew. A third crew member was taken as a prisoner of war. |
| HMT Onward | Royal Navy | World War I: The naval trawler was shelled and sunk in the North Sea off Aberdeen (57°09′N 2°00′W) by SM U-52 (Imperial German Navy). Her fourteen crew survived but were taken as prisoners of war. |

== 12 July ==
List of shipwrecks: 12 July 1916
| Ship | State | Description |
|---|---|---|
| Ramos | United States | The cargo ship foundered in the Atlantic Ocean 600 nautical miles (1,100 km) north of Watling Island, Bermuda. |

== 13 July ==
List of shipwrecks: 13 July 1916
| Ship | State | Description |
|---|---|---|
| Alfa | Denmark | The cargo ship ran aground at Bempton, Yorkshire, United Kingdom. She broke her back and was a total loss. |
| Dalhousie | United Kingdom | World War I: The drifter was scuttled in the North Sea 10 nautical miles (19 km) north north east of Whitby, North Riding of Yorkshire by SM UB-39 (Imperial German Navy). Her crew survived. |
| Florence | United Kingdom | World War I: The trawler was scuttled in the North Sea 13 nautical miles (24 km) north by east of Whitby by SM UB-39 (Imperial German Navy). Her crew survived. |
| Mary Ann | United Kingdom | World War I: The fishing vessel was scuttled in the North Sea 13 nautical miles (24 km) north by east of Whitby by SM UB-39 (Imperial German Navy). Her crew survived. |
| North West | United States | Charleston hurricane of 1916: The barge was sunk, or stranded on shoals off Cape Romain, during a hurricane after losing her line to the tow steamer Wellington (United States). The crew drifted to shore on wreckage. |
| Silverton | United Kingdom | World War I: The collier was torpedoed and sunk in the Mediterranean Sea 14 nautical miles (26 km) north east of the Canai Rocks, Tunisia (37°27′N 10°05′E) by SM U-39 (Imperial German Navy). Her crew survived. |
| South West | United States | Charleston hurricane of 1916: The barge was sunk during a hurricane in 5 Fathoms of water off the entrance to Bull Bay, South Carolina after losing her line to the tow steamer Wellington (United States). Lost with all five hands. |
| Success | United Kingdom | World War I: The fishing vessel was scuttled in the North Sea 13 nautical miles (24 km) north by east of Whitby by SM UB-39 (Imperial German Navy). Her crew survived. |

== 14 July ==
List of shipwrecks: 14 July 1916
| Ship | State | Description |
|---|---|---|
| Antigua | United Kingdom | World War I: The cargo ship was scuttled in the Mediterranean Sea 20 nautical miles (37 km) east by north of Djidjelli, Algeria (36°57′N 6°11′E) by SM U-39 (Imperial German Navy). Her crew survived. |
| Balilla | Italian Royal Navy | World War I: The submarine was sunk in the Adriatic Sea northwest of Lissa by gun and torpedo fire from the torpedo boats 65 F and 66 F (Austro-Hungarian Navy). |
| Ben Aden | United Kingdom | World War I: The fishing vessel was scuttled in the North Sea 15 nautical miles (28 km) north east of Hartlepool, County Durham by SM UB-39 (Imperial German Navy). Her crew survived. |
| Bute | United Kingdom | World War I: The fishing vessel was scuttled in the North Sea 25 nautical miles (46 km) south east of the mouth of the River Tyne by SM UB-39 (Imperial German Navy). Her crew survived. |
| Ecclesia | United Kingdom | World War I: The cargo ship was shelled and sunk in the Mediterranean Sea 11 nautical miles (20 km) off Cape Bougaroni, Algeria (37°12′N 5°57′E) by SM U-39 (Imperial German Navy). Her crew survived. |
| Girl's Friend | United Kingdom | World War I: The drifter was scuttled in the North Sea 21 nautical miles (39 km) east of Hartlepool by SM UB-39 (Imperial German Navy). Her crew survived. |
| USS Hector | United States Navy | USS Hector The Charleston Hurricane of 1916: The collier was disabled in a hurricane in the Atlantic Ocean and was driven ashore, and was wrecked, breaking in two, a total loss at Point Romaine 40 miles (64 km) north of Charleston, South Carolina. She sank on 17 July. Some equipment was salvaged. All 142 people on board were rescued, 111 by Tug Wellington (United States) that was looking for Barges that broke free from her the day before. |
| Langley Castle | United Kingdom | World War I: The drifter was scuttled in the North Sea 18 nautical miles (33 km) north east by east of the mouth of the River Tyne by SM UB-39 (Imperial German Navy). Her crew survived. |
| Ramos | United States | The Charleston Hurricane of 1916: On 12 or 14 July the steamer was sunk during a hurricane 310 miles (500 km) north west of Watling Island. Her captain and ten crewmen were killed, one eaten by sharks. Survivors were rescued after 36 hours by Jose (United States). |
| Recorder | United Kingdom | World War I: The trawler was scuttled in the North sea 16 nautical miles (30 km) north east by east of the mouth of the River Tyne by SM UB-39 (Imperial German Navy). Her crew survived. |
| SM U-51 | Imperial German Navy | World War I: The Type U 51 submarine was torpedoed and sunk at the mouth of the Ems by HMS H5 (Royal Navy) with the loss of 34 of her 38 crew. |

== 15 July ==
List of shipwrecks: 15 July 1916
| Ship | State | Description |
|---|---|---|
| Bertha | Norway | World War I: The schooner was set afire in the North Sea 60 nautical miles (110 km) east of West Hartlepool, County Durham, United Kingdom by SM UB-18 (Imperial German Navy). She was towed in to port but was declared a total loss. Her crew survived. |
| Dina | Netherlands | World War I: The schooner was sunk in the North Sea 40 nautical miles (74 km) off Sunderland, County Durham by SM UB-18 (Imperial German Navy). |
| HMS H3 | Royal Navy | World War I: The H-class submarine struck a mine and sank in the Gulf of Cattaro. |
| Sylvie | United Kingdom | World War I: The cargo ship was shelled and sunk in the Mediterranean Sea 15 nautical miles (28 km) off Cape Sigli, Algeria (37°10′N 5°00′E) by SM U-39 (Imperial German Navy). Her crew survived. |

== 16 July ==
List of shipwrecks: 16 July 1916
| Ship | State | Description |
|---|---|---|
| Alto | United Kingdom | World War I: The cargo ship struck a mine and sank in the North Sea 4 nautical miles (7.4 km) off Kessingland, Suffolk. Her crew survived. |
| Euphorbia | United Kingdom | World War I: The cargo ship was torpedoed and sunk in the Mediterranean Sea 56 nautical miles (104 km) north east of Algiers, Algeria by SM U-39 (Imperial German Navy) with the loss of eleven crew. |
| Mopsa | United Kingdom | World War I: The coaster struck a mine and was damaged in the North Sea 7 nautical miles (13 km) south of Lowestoft, Suffolk. She was beached but was declared a total loss. Her crew survived. |
| Sirra | Italy | World War I: The cargo ship was sunk in the Mediterranean Sea off Cape Cherchell, Algeria (37°39′N 3°20′E) by SM U-39 (Imperial German Navy). Her crew survived. |
| Virginia | United Kingdom | World War I: The cargo ship was torpedoed and sunk in the Mediterranean Sea 42 nautical miles (78 km) south west by west of Cape Matapan, Greece by SM UB-45 (Imperial German Navy) with the loss of two of her 50 crew. |
| William Chisholm | United States | The cargo ship struck the bank of the Cape Cod Canal, was holed, and sank near Bournedale, Massachusetts. The wreck was blown up and removed for scrap between 20 and 24 August. |
| Wiltonhall | United Kingdom | World War I: The cargo ship was scuttled in the Mediterranean Sea 65 nautical miles (120 km) north west of Algiers (37°54′N 3°50′E) by SM U-39 (Imperial German Navy). Her crew survived. |
| Yeijo Maru | Japan | The steam schooner was wrecked off Kinkazan. |

== 17 July ==
List of shipwrecks: 17 July 1916
| Ship | State | Description |
|---|---|---|
| Angelo | United Kingdom | World War I: The cargo ship was sunk in the Mediterranean Sea 80 nautical miles (150 km) north east of Algiers, Algeria by SM U-39 (Imperial German Navy). |
| Gertrude | United Kingdom | World War I: The fishing vessel was scuttled in the North Sea 10 nautical miles (19 km) north north east of the Haisborough Lightship (United Kingdom) by SM UB-18 (Imperial German Navy). Her crew survived. |
| Glance | United Kingdom | World War I: The fishing vessel was scuttled in the North Sea 10 nautical miles (19 km) north north east of the Haisborough Lightship (United Kingdom) by SM UB-18 (Imperial German Navy). Her crew survived. |
| Loch Nevis | United Kingdom | World War I: The fishing smack was scuttled in the North Sea off the Smith's Knoll Lightship (United Kingdom) by SM UB-18 (Imperial German Navy). Her crew survived. |
| Loch Tay | United Kingdom | World War I: The fishing smack was scuttled in the North Sea 10 nautical miles (19 km) north north east of the Haisborough Lightship (United Kingdom) by SM UB-18 (Imperial German Navy). Her crew survived. |
| Rosemoor | United Kingdom | World War I: The cargo ship was scuttled in the Mediterranean Sea 80 nautical miles (150 km) north east of Algiers (37°53′N 3°56′E) by SM U-39 (Imperial German Navy). Her crew survived. |
| Syria | Germany | World War I: The cargo ship was torpedoed and sunk in the Baltic Sea off Skellefteå, Västerbottne County, Sweden. |
| Waverley | United Kingdom | World War I: The fishing smack was scuttled in the North Sea 10 nautical miles (19 km) north north east of the Haisborough Lightship (United Kingdom) by SM UB-18 (Imperial German Navy). Her crew survived. |
| V.M.G. | United Kingdom | World War I: The fishing smack was scuttled in the North Sea 6 nautical miles (11 km) north east of the Haisborough Lightship (United Kingdom) by SM UB-18 (Imperial German Navy). Her crew survived. |

== 18 July ==
List of shipwrecks: 18 July 1916
| Ship | State | Description |
|---|---|---|
| Llongwen | United Kingdom | World War I: The cargo ship sank in the Mediterranean Sea 90 nautical miles (170 km) north east of Algiers, Algeria (37°48′N 3°48′E) by SM U-39 (Imperial German Navy) with the loss of fourteen crew. |
| Neto | United Kingdom | World War I: The 3,000-ton Glasgow steamer grounded at Gurnard's Head, Cornwall while carrying hay and fodder to Cherbourg in thick fog. |
| Ville de Rouen | France | World War I: The cargo ship sank in the Mediterranean Sea 120 nautical miles (220 km) south west of Cape Matapan, Greece by SM UB-45 (Imperial German Navy) with the loss of three of her crew. |

== 19 July ==
List of shipwrecks: 19 July 1916
| Ship | State | Description |
|---|---|---|
| Warrior | United States | The Yacht went ashore on Fishers Island, New York. |

== 20 July ==
List of shipwrecks: 20 July 1916
| Ship | State | Description |
|---|---|---|
| Cettois | France | World War I: The coaster sank in the Mediterranean Sea 60 nautical miles (110 km) north of Algiers, Algeria (37°23′N 2°10′E) by SM U-39 (Imperial German Navy). |
| Enrico Parodi | Italy | World War I: The 3,818-ton collier sank off The Carracks, Cornwall while being towed to St Ives by the Lady of the Isles. She ran aground off Gurnard's Head in dense fog, and was re-floated by a salvage team working on Neto, which was wrecked two days previous. She was heading to Messina from Cardiff with coal. |
| Grangemoor | United Kingdom | World War I: The cargo ship was shelled and sank in the Mediterranean Sea 75 nautical miles (139 km) north west by west of Algiers by SM U-39 (Imperial German Navy). Her crew survived. |
| Karma | United Kingdom | World War I: The cargo ship was shelled and sank in the Mediterranean Sea 68 nautical miles (126 km) north north west of Algiers (37°19′N 1°55′E) by SM U-39 (Imperial German Navy). Her crew survived. |
| Kasagi | Imperial Japanese Navy | The Kasagi-class cruiser ran aground in the Tsugaru Strait. She sank on 10 August. |
| "Barge No. 8" | United States | The Barge was sunk in a collision with Comus in fog 20 miles south of Scotland Lightship, off New York City. |
| Sirra | Netherlands | World War I: The three-masted auxiliary schooner was shelled and sank in the North Sea 70 nautical miles (130 km) north east of the Shetland Islands, United Kingdom by SM U-71 (Imperial German Navy). |
| Yzer | United Kingdom | World War I: The cargo ship was torpedoed and sank in the Mediterranean Sea 56 nautical miles (104 km) north west of Algiers (37°12′N 2°20′E) by SM U-39 (Imperial German Navy) with the loss of a crew member. |

== 21 July ==
List of shipwrecks: 21 July 1916
| Ship | State | Description |
|---|---|---|
| Wolf | United Kingdom | World War I: The cargo ship was shelled and sunk in the Mediterranean Sea 75 nautical miles (139 km) north north west of Algiers, Algeria (35°52′N 2°10′E) by SM U-39 (Imperial German Navy). Her crew survived. |

== 22 July ==
List of shipwrecks: 22 July 1916
| Ship | State | Description |
|---|---|---|
| Albertha | United States | The schooner went ashore near Monomoy Point, Massachusetts. |
| Bams | Norway | World War I: The sailing vessel was sunk in the North Sea east of Hartlepool, County Durham, United Kingdom (55°17′N 0°29′W) by SM UB-37 (Imperial German Navy). Her crew survived. |
| Ida | Sweden | World War I: The barque was burnt and sunk in the North Sea east of Hartlepool by SM UB-37 (Imperial German Navy). Her crew survived. |
| Juno | Norway | World War I: The brig was sunk in the North Sea east of Hartlepool (50°40′N 0°00′E) by SM UB-37 (Imperial German Navy). Her crew survived. |
| Knutsford | United Kingdom | World War I: The cargo ship was shelled and sunk in the Mediterranean Sea 12 nautical miles (22 km) north west by north of Cape Corbelin, Algeria by SM U-39 (Imperial German Navy). Her crew survived. |
| Olive | United Kingdom | World War I: The cargo ship was shelled and sunk in the Mediterranean Sea 10 nautical miles (19 km) north west by north of Cape Corbelin by SM U-39 (Imperial German Navy). Her crew survived. |
| Preference | Sweden | World War I: The brigantine was sunk in the North Sea 50 nautical miles (93 km) east of Hartlepool by SM UB-37 (Imperial German Navy). Her crew survived. |
| Subra | Norway | World War I: The sailing vessel was sunk in the North Sea east of Hartlepool (54°45′N 0°00′E) by SM UB-37 (Imperial German Navy). Her crew survived. |

== 23 July ==
List of shipwrecks: 23 July 1916
| Ship | State | Description |
|---|---|---|
| Badminton | United Kingdom | World War I: The cargo ship was shelled and sunk in the Mediterranean Sea 65 nautical miles (120 km) north east by north of Cape Carbon, Algeria by SM U-39 (Imperial German Navy). Her crew survived. |

== 24 July ==
List of shipwrecks: 24 July 1916
| Ship | State | Description |
|---|---|---|
| Balvenie | United Kingdom | The cargo ship collided with Tagona (United Kingdom) in the Bristol Channel off Lundy Island, Devon and sank with the loss of two lives. |
| Maria | Italy | World War I: The brigantine was sunk in the Mediterranean Sea off the east coast of Algeria (37°38′N 9°20′E) by SM U-39 (Imperial German Navy). |
| Mars | Norway | World War I: The sailing vessel was sunk in the North Sea off the mouth of the River Tyne (55°51′N 0°13′E) by SM UB-19 (Imperial German Navy). Her crew survived. |
| Mary | Norway | World War I: The barge was scuttled in the North Sea 30 nautical miles (56 km) east north east of the mouth of the River Tyne (55°12′N 0°35′E) by SM UB-23 (Imperial German Navy). Her crew survived. |
| Matatua | United Kingdom | The cargo ship ran aground at St. Mary's, Newfoundland. She was refloated on 28 August. |
| Powel | United States | The Schooner barge went aground at San Juan, Puerto Rico when she lost the tow line to her Tug. |

== 25 July ==
List of shipwrecks: 25 July 1916
| Ship | State | Description |
|---|---|---|
| Norderney | Germany | The cargo ship foundered in the Baltic Sea off Rügen, Mecklenburg-Vorpommern with the loss of four of her crew. |
| SMS Peter Deuss | Imperial German Navy | The Vorpostenboot was lost on this date. |
| "Thomas J. Horan" | United States | The Barge went aground on Plum Island, in Plum Gut in dense fog, later sinking and breaking up. Wreck later removed. |

== 26 July ==
List of shipwrecks: 26 July 1916
| Ship | State | Description |
|---|---|---|
| Duguay Trouin | France | The barque was severely damaged by fire at Nantes, Loire-Inférieure. |
| Ellen Kirstine | Denmark | The schooner collided with a Russian merchant ship in the North Sea. Her crew were rescued. |
| Flore | France | World War I: The cargo liner sank in the North Sea 8 nautical miles (15 km) east of Fetlar, Shetland Islands, United Kingdom. She probably struck a mine. |
| Kentigern | Norway | World War I: The barque was sunk in the North Sea 40 nautical miles (74 km) east north east of Hartlepool, County Durham, United Kingdom (55°10′N 0°20′W) by SM UB-23 (Imperial German Navy). Her crew survived. |
| HMS TB 9 | Royal Navy | The torpedo boat, formerly a Cricket-class coastal destroyer, collided with destroyer HMS Matchless (Royal Navy) and sank in the North Sea with the loss of one life. |
| HMT White Rose | Royal Navy | The naval trawler was lost on this date. |

== 27 July ==
List of shipwrecks: 27 July 1916
| Ship | State | Description |
|---|---|---|
| Agenda | Norway | World War I: The brig was sunk in the North Sea off the mouth of the River Tyne (55°15′N 0°40′W) by SM UB-23 (Imperial German Navy). Her crew survived. |
| SMS M12 | Imperial German Navy | World War I: The M1-class minesweeper was sunk by mines in the North Sea. |

== 28 July ==
List of shipwrecks: 28 July 1916
| Ship | State | Description |
|---|---|---|
| Andrew Ina | United Kingdom | World War I: The fishing vessel was scuttled in the North Sea 12.5 nautical miles (23.2 km) north east of the mouth of the River Tyne by SM UB-23 (Imperial German Navy). |
| Dandolo | Italy | World War I: The cargo ship was sunk in the Mediterranean Sea 50 nautical miles (93 km) south east of Cape Spartivento, Calabria (37°50′N 7°40′E) by SM U-35 (Imperial German Navy). |
| Good Design | United Kingdom | World War I: The fishing vessel was scuttled in the North Sea 15 nautical miles (28 km) north east of the mouth of the River Tyne by SM UB-23 (Imperial German Navy). |
| Jane Stewart | United Kingdom | World War I: The fishing vessel was scuttled in the North Sea 15 nautical miles (28 km) north east of the mouth of the River Tyne by SM UB-23 (Imperial German Navy). |
| Janet Overstone | United Kingdom | World War I: The fishing vessel was rammed and sunk in the North Sea 13 nautical miles (24 km) north east of the mouth of the River Tyne by SM UB-23 (Imperial German Navy). |
| Johan | United Kingdom | World War I: The fishing vessel was scuttled in the North Sea 15 nautical miles (28 km) north east of the mouth of the River Tyne by SM UB-23 (Imperial German Navy). |
| HMS Majestic II | Royal Navy | The auxiliary minesweeper foundered in the Mediterranean Sea off Oran, Algeria. |
| Renown | United Kingdom | World War I: The drifter was scuttled in the North Sea 15 nautical miles (28 km) north east of the mouth of the River Tyne by SM UB-23 (Imperial German Navy). Her crew survived. |
| Speedwell | United Kingdom | World War I: The drifter was scuttled in the North Sea 15 nautical miles (28 km) north east of the mouth of the River Tyne by SM UB-23 (Imperial German Navy). |
| Spero Meliora | United Kingdom | World War I: The fishing vessel was scuttled in the North Sea 15 nautical miles (28 km) north east of the mouth of the River Tyne by SM UB-23 (Imperial German Navy). |
| Volunteer | United Kingdom | World War I: The fishing vessel was scuttled in the North Sea 15 nautical miles (28 km) north east of the mouth of the River Tyne by SM UB-23 (Imperial German Navy). Her crew survived. |

== 29 July ==
List of shipwrecks: 29 July 1916
| Ship | State | Description |
|---|---|---|
| J. B. Walker | United States | The Schooner barge sank, or struck a submerged obstruction and was beached, near Great Round Shoals, Nantucket, Massachusetts. Later raised, or refloated, and taken to Providence, Rhode Island. Described as a hulk when taken over by the U.S. Navy in 1917. |
| Letimbro | Italy | World War I: The cargo ship was sunk in the Mediterranean Sea 40 nautical miles (74 km) off Benghazi, Italian Libya (33°30′N 18°43′E) by SM U-39 (Imperial German Navy). |
| Mina | Greece | The cargo ship collided with Attualita (Italy) in the Strait of Gibraltar 9 nautical miles (17 km) east of Gibraltar and sank. Her crew were rescued. |
| Rosarina G.V. | Italy | World War I: The sailing vessel was sunk in the Mediterranean Sea off the coast of French protectorate of Tunisia by SM U-39 (Imperial German Navy). |

== 30 July ==
List of shipwrecks: 30 July 1916
| Ship | State | Description |
|---|---|---|
| Anna | Sweden | World War I: The brigantine was sunk in the Baltic Sea off Rauma, Finland by SM UB-36 (Imperial German Navy). Her crew survived. |
| Britannic | United Kingdom | World War I: The cargo ship was sunk in the Mediterranean Sea 20 nautical miles (37 km) east south east of Cape Bon, Tunisia by SM U-35 (Imperial German Navy). Her crew survived. |
| Claudia | United Kingdom | World War I: The cargo ship struck a mine placed by SM UC-1 (Imperial German Navy) and sank in the North Sea 8.5 nautical miles (15.7 km) south of Lowestoft, Suffolk with the loss of three of her crew. |
| Ethelbryhta | United Kingdom | World War I: The cargo ship was shelled and sunk in the Mediterranean Sea 11 nautical miles (20 km) west south west of Pantellaria, Italy (36°34′N 11°44′E) by SM U-35 (Imperial German Navy). Her crew survived. |
| Giacinto Pullino | Italian Royal Navy | The Pullino-class submarine ran aground at Galiola Island in the Kvarner Gulf. Her crew damaged her before she was captured by Austria-Hungary. Refloated by the Austro-Hungarians, she sank on 1 August 1917 while under tow to Pola. |
| Giuseppe Marta | Ottoman Empire | World War I: The sailing vessel was sunk in the Mediterranean Sea (36°25′N 12°05′E) by SM U-35 (Imperial German Navy). |
| Katholm | Denmark | World War I: The cargo ship was shelled and sunk in the Mediterranean Sea 25 nautical miles (46 km) north east of Cape Bon by SM U-35 (Imperial German Navy). Her crew survived. |

== 31 July ==
List of shipwrecks: 31 July 1916
| Ship | State | Description |
|---|---|---|
| Braconash | United Kingdom | World War I: The trawler was scuttled in the North Sea 18 nautical miles (33 km) south east of the mouth of the River Tyne by a Kaiserliche Marine submarine. |
| Citta di Messina | Italy | World War I: The cargo ship was sunk in the Mediterranean Sea 50 nautical miles (93 km) north of Trapani, Sicily (37°55′N 11°00′E) by SM U-35 (Imperial German Navy). Her crew survived. |
| Einar | Norway | World War I: The trawler was sunk in the Mediterranean Sea (38°12′N 10°28′E) by SM U-35 (Imperial German Navy). Her crew survived. |
| Emilio G. | Italy | World War I: The brigantine was sunk in the Mediterranean Sea off Sicily by SM U-35 (Imperial German Navy). |
| Erling | Norway | World War I: The trawler was sunk in the Mediterranean Sea (38°12′N 10°28′E) by SM U-35 (Imperial German Navy). Her crew survived. |
| Generale Amiglio | Italy | World War I: The sailing vessel was sunk in the Mediterranean Sea west of Sicily by SM U-35 (Imperial German Navy). Her crew survived. |
| George E. Walcott | United States | The schooner caught fire and sank at New York. |
| King James | United Kingdom | World War I: The trawler was scuttled in the North Sea 15 nautical miles (28 km) south east of the mouth of the River Tyne by a Kaiserliche Marine submarine. |
| Tatiana | United Kingdom | World War I: The trawler was sunk in the North Sea 19 nautical miles (35 km) south east of the mouth of the River Tyne by a Kaiserliche Marine submarine. |

== Unknown date ==
List of shipwrecks: Unknown date 1916
| Ship | State | Description |
|---|---|---|
| Martha H. Hennen | United States | The tugboat was lost sometime in July, possibly in the Warrior River. |
| SM U-77 | Imperial German Navy | World War I: The Type UE I submarine was lost on patrol in the North Sea after 7 July with the loss of all 33 crew. |
