= SM UB-23 =

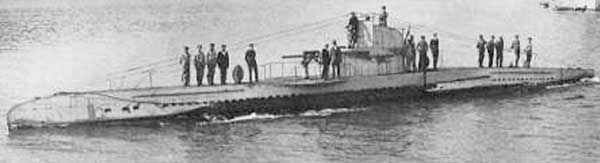
- SM UB-45, a U-boat similar to UB-23

History

German Empire
- Name: UB-23
- Ordered: 30 April 1915
- Builder: Blohm & Voss, Hamburg
- Yard number: 253
- Launched: 9 October 1915
- Commissioned: 13 March 1916
- Fate: Interned at Corunna, Spain, 29 July 1917

General characteristics
- Class & type: Type UB II submarine
- Displacement: 263 t (259 long tons) surfaced; 292 t (287 long tons) submerged
- Length: 36.13 m (118 ft 6 in) o/a; 27.13 m (89 ft) pressure hull
- Beam: 4.36 m (14 ft 4 in) o/a; 3.85 m (13 ft) pressure hull
- Draught: 3.70 m (12 ft 2 in)
- Propulsion: 1 × propeller shaft; 2 × 6-cylinder diesel engine, 284 PS (209 kW; 280 bhp); 2 × electric motor, 280 PS (210 kW; 280 shp)
- Speed: 9.15 knots (16.95 km/h; 10.53 mph) surfaced; 5.81 knots (10.76 km/h; 6.69 mph) submerged
- Range: 6,450 nmi (11,950 km; 7,420 mi) at 5 knots (9.3 km/h; 5.8 mph) surfaced; 45 nmi (83 km; 52 mi) at 4 knots (7.4 km/h; 4.6 mph) submerged
- Test depth: 50 m (160 ft)
- Complement: 2 officers, 21 men
- Armament: 2 × 50 cm (19.7 in) torpedo tubes; 4 × torpedoes (later 6); 1 × 5 cm SK L/40 gun
- Notes: 45-second diving time

Service record
- Part of: Flandern Flotilla; 19 May 1916 – 29 July 1917
- Commanders: Oblt.z.S. Ernst Voigt; 13 March – 9 November 1916; Oblt.z.S. Heinz Ziemer; 10 November 1916 – 5 February 1917; Oblt.z.S. Herbert Lefholz; 6 – 18 February 1917; Oblt.z.S. Matthias Graf von Schmettow; 19 February – 19 March 1917; Oblt.z.S. Hans Ewald Niemer; 20 March – 29 July 1917
- Operations: 21 patrols
- Victories: 51 merchant ships sunk (33,880 GRT); 1 merchant ship damaged (419 GRT)

SM UB-23 (Note: "SM" stands for "Seiner Majestät" (English: His Majesty's) and combined with the U for Unterseeboot would be translated as His Majesty's Submarine.) was a German Type UB II submarine or U-boat in the German Imperial Navy (German: Kaiserliche Marine) during World War I. The U-boat was ordered on 30 April 1915 and launched on 9 October 1915. She was commissioned into the Imperial German Navy on 13 March 1916 as SM UB-23. The submarine sank 51 ships in 21 patrols for a total of 33,880 gross register tons (GRT). On 26 July 1917, UB-23 was badly damaged by a depth charge attack by HMS PC-60 off the Lizard; she put in at Corunna, Spain, on 29 July 1917 and was interned. On 22 January 1919 she was surrendered to France in accordance with the requirements of the Armistice with Germany, and she was broken up in Cherbourg in July 1921.

== Design ==
A Type UB II submarine, UB-23 had a displacement of 263 tonnes (259 long tons) when at the surface and 292 tonnes (287 long tons) while submerged. She had a total length of 36.13 m (118 ft 6 in), a beam of 4.36 m (14 ft 4 in), and a draught of 3.70 m (12 ft 2 in). The submarine was powered by two Körting six-cylinder, four-stroke diesel engines each producing a total 280 metric horsepower (280 shp; 210 kW), a Siemens-Schuckert electric motor producing 206 kilowatts (276 shp; 280 PS), and one propeller shaft. She was capable of operating at depths of up to 50 metres (160 ft).

The submarine had a maximum surface speed of 9.15 knots (16.95 km/h; 10.53 mph) and a maximum submerged speed of 5.81 knots (10.76 km/h; 6.69 mph). When submerged, she could operate for 45 nautical miles (83 km; 52 mi) at 4 knots (7.4 km/h; 4.6 mph); when surfaced, she could travel 6,650 nautical miles (12,320 km; 7,650 mi) at 5 knots (9.3 km/h; 5.8 mph). UB-23 was fitted with two 50 centimetres (20 in) torpedo tubes, four torpedoes, and one 5 cm (2.0 in) SK L/40 deck gun. She had a complement of twenty-one crew members and two officers and a 45-second dive time.

== Summary of raiding history ==
Date	Name	Nationality	Tonnage (Note: Tonnages are in gross register tons)	Fate
4 July 1916	Queen Bee	United Kingdom	34	Sunk
5 July 1916	Annie Anderson	United Kingdom	77	Sunk
5 July 1916	Peep O’ Day	United Kingdom	52	Sunk
6 July 1916	Girl Bessie	United Kingdom	62	Sunk
6 July 1916	Nancy Hunnam	United Kingdom	58	Sunk
6 July 1916	Newark Castle	United Kingdom	85	Sunk
6 July 1916	Petunia	United Kingdom	58	Sunk
6 July 1916	Watchful	United Kingdom	52	Sunk
24 July 1916	Mary	Norway	560	Sunk
26 July 1916	Kentigern	Norway	796	Sunk
27 July 1916	Agenda	Norway	226	Sunk
28 July 1916	Andrew Ina	United Kingdom	50	Sunk
28 July 1916	Good Design	United Kingdom	40	Sunk
28 July 1916	Jane Stewart	United Kingdom	15	Sunk
28 July 1916	Janet Overstone	United Kingdom	15	Sunk
28 July 1916	Johan	United Kingdom	49	Sunk
28 July 1916	Renown	United Kingdom	61	Sunk
28 July 1916	Speedwell	United Kingdom	11	Sunk
28 July 1916	Spero Meliora	United Kingdom	11	Sunk
28 July 1916	Volunteer	United Kingdom	15	Sunk
3 September 1916	General Archinard	France	355	Sunk
6 September 1916	Britannia	United Kingdom	48	Sunk
7 September 1916	Emma	France	19	Sunk
7 September 1916	Farfadet	France	17	Sunk
7 September 1916	Jeanne D’Arc	France	17	Sunk
7 September 1916	Leonine	France	20	Sunk
8 September 1916	Marie Louise	France	157	Sunk
8 September 1916	Mayo	Spain	1,880	Sunk
9 September 1916	Gemma	Kingdom of Italy	3,111	Sunk
9 September 1916	Remora	France	92	Sunk
21 October 1916	Julia	France	166	Sunk
21 October 1916	Snestad	Norway	2,350	Sunk
23 October 1916	Alf	Denmark	196	Sunk
23 October 1916	Antoine Allosia	France	29	Sunk
23 October 1916	Saint Pierre	France	151	Sunk
23 October 1916	Venus II	Norway	784	Sunk
26 October 1916	Saint Yves	France	165	Sunk
30 November 1916	Gaete	France	170	Sunk
2 December 1916	Harpalus	United Kingdom	1,445	Sunk
4 December 1916	Nervion	Norway	1,921	Sunk
8 December 1916	Conch	United Kingdom	5,620	Sunk
7 January 1917	Brenda	United Kingdom	249	Sunk
2 February 1917	Gabrielle	France	1,410	Sunk
31 March 1917	Hestia	Netherlands	959	Sunk
31 March 1917	Lisbeth	Norway	1,621	Sunk
4 April 1917	Trevier	Belgium	3,006	Sunk
18 April 1917	Marcel	Belgium	24	Sunk
31 May 1917	Dirigo	United States	3,004	Sunk
2 June 1917	Prudence	United Kingdom	25	Sunk
5 June 1917	Laura Ann	United Kingdom	116	Sunk
30 June 1917	Ilston	United Kingdom	2,426	Sunk
4 July 1917	Gloire à Dieu	France	419	Damaged

== Bibliography ==
- Bendert, Harald (2000). Die UB-Boote der Kaiserlichen Marine, 1914-1918. Einsätze, Erfolge, Schicksal (in German). Hamburg: Verlag E.S. Mittler & Sohn GmbH. ISBN 3-8132-0713-7.
- Gröner, Erich; Jung, Dieter; Maass, Martin (1991). U-boats and Mine Warfare Vessels. German Warships 1815–1945. Vol. 2. Translated by Thomas, Keith; Magowan, Rachel. London: Conway Maritime Press. ISBN 0-85177-593-4.
- Rössler, Eberhard (1979). Die deutschen U-Boote und ihre Werften: eine Bilddokumentation über den deutschen U-Bootbau; in zwei Bänden (in German). Vol. I. Munich: Bernard & Graefe. ISBN 3-7637-5213-7.
