= SM UB-19 =

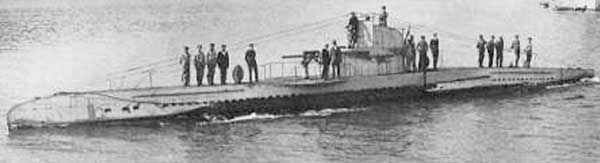
- SM UB-45, a U-boat similar to UB-19

History

German Empire
- Name: UB-19
- Ordered: 30 April 1915
- Builder: Blohm & Voss, Hamburg
- Yard number: 249
- Launched: 2 September 1915
- Commissioned: 16 December 1915
- Fate: Sunk, 30 November 1916

General characteristics
- Class & type: Type UB II submarine
- Displacement: 263 t (259 long tons) surfaced; 292 t (287 long tons) submerged
- Length: 36.13 m (118 ft 6 in) o/a; 27.13 m (89 ft) pressure hull
- Beam: 4.36 m (14 ft 4 in) o/a; 3.85 m (13 ft) pressure hull
- Draught: 3.70 m (12 ft 2 in)
- Propulsion: 1 × propeller shaft; 2 × four-stroke 6-cylinder diesel engine, 284 PS (209 kW; 280 bhp); 2 × electric motor, 280 PS (210 kW; 280 shp)
- Speed: 9.15 knots (16.95 km/h; 10.53 mph) surfaced; 5.81 knots (10.76 km/h; 6.69 mph) submerged
- Range: 6,650 nmi (12,320 km; 7,650 mi) at 5 knots (9.3 km/h; 5.8 mph) surfaced; 45 nmi (83 km; 52 mi) at 4 knots (7.4 km/h; 4.6 mph) submerged
- Test depth: 50 m (160 ft)
- Complement: 2 officers, 21 men
- Armament: 2 × 50 cm (19.7 in) torpedo tubes; 4 × torpedoes (later 6); 1 × 5 cm SK L/40 gun
- Notes: 45-second diving time

Service record
- Part of: Flandern Flotilla; 1 March – 30 November 1916
- Commanders: Kptlt. Walter Gustav Becker; 17 December 1915 – 3 November 1916; Oblt.z.S. Erich Noodt; 4 – 30 November 1916
- Operations: 15 patrols
- Victories: 13 merchant ships sunk (10,040 GRT); 1 merchant ship damaged (3,020 GRT); 1 merchant ship taken as prize (1,970 GRT)

SM UB-19 (Note: "SM" stands for "Seiner Majestät" (English: His Majesty's) and combined with the U for Unterseeboot would be translated as His Majesty's Submarine.) was a German Type UB II submarine or U-boat in the German Imperial Navy (German: Kaiserliche Marine) during World War I. The U-boat was ordered on 30 April 1915 and launched on 2 September 1915. She was commissioned into the German Imperial Navy on 16 December 1915 as SM UB-19. The submarine sank 13 ships in 15 patrols for a total of 10,040 gross register tons (GRT). UB-19 was sunk in the English Channel at 49°56′N 2°45′W on 30 November 1916 by British Q ship HMS Penshurst (Q 7).

== Design ==
A Type UB II submarine, ‘’UB-19’’ had a displacement of 263 tonnes (259 long tons) when at the surface and 292 tonnes (287 long tons) while submerged. They had a length overall of 36.13 m (118 ft 6 in), a beam of 4.54 m (14 ft 11 in), and a draught of 3.70 m (12 ft 2 in). The submarine was powered by two Daimler six-cylinder four-stroke diesel engines each producing 284 metric horsepower (209 kW; 280 shp) (a total of 600 metric horsepower (440 kW; 590 shp)), two Siemens-Schuckert electric motors producing 280 metric horsepower (210 kW; 280 shp), and one propeller shaft. She had a dive time of 32 seconds and was capable of operating at a depth of 50 metres (160 ft).

The submarine's top submerged speed was 5.81 knots and its top surface speed was 9.15 knots (16.95 km/h; 10.53 mph). When submerged, she could operate for 45 nautical miles (83 km; 52 mi) at 5 knots (9.3 km/h; 5.8 mph); when surfaced she could travel 6,650 nautical miles (12,320 km; 7,650 mi) at 5 knots (9.3 km/h; 5.8 mph). UB-19 was fitted with two 50 centimetres (20 in) torpedo tubes in the bow, four torpedoes, and one 5 cm (2.0 in) Tk L/40 deck gun. Her complement was twenty-three crew members.

== Summary of raiding history ==
Date	Name	Nationality	Tonnage (Note: Tonnages are in gross register tons)	Fate
18 May 1916	Osprey	United Kingdom	18	Sunk
24 July 1916	Mars	Norway	106	Sunk
10 August 1916	San Bernardo	United Kingdom	3,803	Sunk
4 October 1916	Jennie Bullas	United Kingdom	26	Sunk
4 October 1916	Jersey	United Kingdom	162	Sunk
4 October 1916	Rado	United Kingdom	182	Sunk
5 October 1916	Rover	United Kingdom	42	Sunk
25 October 1916	Comtesse De Flandre	Belgium	1,810	Sunk
26 October 1916	Iduna	France	165	Sunk
10 November 1916	Koningin Regentes	Netherlands	1,970	Captured as prize
23 November 1916	Ernaston	United Kingdom	3,020	Damaged
24 November 1916	Jerseyman	United Kingdom	358	Sunk
27 November 1916	Belle Ile	Norway	1,884	Sunk
27 November 1916	Visborg	Norway	1,343	Sunk
30 November 1916	Behrend	United Kingdom	141	Sunk

== Bibliography ==
- Bendert, Harald (2000). Die UB-Boote der Kaiserlichen Marine, 1914-1918. Einsätze, Erfolge, Schicksal (in German). Hamburg: Verlag E.S. Mittler & Sohn GmbH. ISBN 3-8132-0713-7.
- Gröner, Erich; Jung, Dieter; Maass, Martin (1991). U-boats and Mine Warfare Vessels. German Warships 1815–1945. Vol. 2. Translated by Thomas, Keith; Magowan, Rachel. London: Conway Maritime Press. ISBN 0-85177-593-4.
- Rössler, Eberhard (1979). Die deutschen U-Boote und ihre Werften: eine Bilddokumentation über den deutschen U-Bootbau; in zwei Bänden (in German). Vol. I. Munich: Bernard & Graefe. ISBN 3-7637-5213-7.
