= SM UB-37 =

Coordinates: 50°7′N 1°47′E

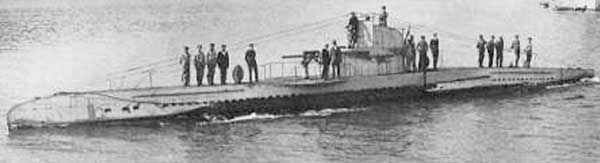
- SM UB-45 a U-boat similar to UB-37

History

German Empire
- Name: UB-37
- Ordered: 22 July 1915
- Builder: Blohm & Voss, Hamburg
- Cost: 1,152,000 German Papiermark
- Yard number: 261
- Launched: 28 December 1915
- Completed: 10 June 1916
- Commissioned: 17 June 1916
- Fate: Sunk 14 January 1917

General characteristics
- Class & type: Type UB II submarine
- Displacement: 274 t (270 long tons) surfaced; 303 t (298 long tons) submerged
- Length: 36.90 m (121 ft 1 in) o/a; 27.90 m (91 ft 6 in) pressure hull
- Beam: 4.37 m (14 ft 4 in) o/a; 3.85 m (12 ft 8 in) pressure hull
- Draught: 3.69 m (12 ft 1 in)
- Propulsion: 1 × propeller shaft; 2 × 6-cylinder diesel engine, 270 PS (200 kW; 270 bhp); 2 × electric motor, 280 PS (210 kW; 280 shp)
- Speed: 9.06 knots (16.78 km/h; 10.43 mph) surfaced; 5.71 knots (10.57 km/h; 6.57 mph) submerged
- Range: 7,030 nmi (13,020 km; 8,090 mi) at 5 knots (9.3 km/h; 5.8 mph) surfaced; 45 nmi (83 km; 52 mi) at 4 knots (7.4 km/h; 4.6 mph) submerged
- Test depth: 50 m (160 ft)
- Complement: 2 officers, 21 men
- Armament: 2 × 50 cm (19.7 in) torpedo tubes; 4 × torpedoes (later 6); 1 × 8.8 cm (3.5 in) Uk L/30 deck gun
- Notes: 42-second diving time

Service record
- Part of: Flandern Flotilla; 5 July 1916 – 14 January 1917
- Commanders: Oblt.z.S. Hans Valentiner; 17 May - 6 November 1916; Oblt.z.S. Paul Günther; 7 November 1916 – 14 January 1917
- Operations: 10 patrols
- Victories: 31 merchant ships sunk (20,504 GRT); 2 merchant ships damaged (431 GRT); 1 auxiliary warship damaged (1,191 GRT); 1 merchant ship taken as prize (400 GRT)

SM UB-37 was a German Type UB II submarine or U-boat in the German Imperial Navy (German: Kaiserliche Marine) during World War I. The U-boat was ordered on 22 July 1915 and launched on 28 December 1915. She was commissioned into the German Imperial Navy on 17 June 1916 as SM UB-37. (Note: "SM" stands for "Seiner Majestät" (English: His Majesty's) and combined with the U for Unterseeboot would be translated as His Majesty's Submarine.)

The submarine sank 31 ships in ten patrols, and was itself sunk by British Q ship HMS Penshurst in the English Channel on 14 January 1917.

The wreck of UB-37 was identified by marine archaeologist Innes McCartney in 1999.

== Design ==
A Type UB II submarine, UB-37 had a displacement of 274 tonnes (270 long tons) when at the surface and 303 tonnes (298 long tons) while submerged. She had a total length of 36.90 m (121 ft 1 in), a beam of 4.37 m (14 ft 4 in), and a draught of 3.69 m (12 ft 1 in). The submarine was powered by two Benz six-cylinder diesel engines producing a total 270 metric horsepower (270 shp; 200 kW), two Siemens-Schuckert electric motors producing 280 metric horsepower (210 kW; 280 shp), and one propeller shaft. She was capable of operating at depths of up to 50 metres (160 ft).

The submarine had a maximum surface speed of 9.06 knots (16.78 km/h; 10.43 mph) and a maximum submerged speed of 5.71 knots (10.57 km/h; 6.57 mph). When submerged, she could operate for 45 nautical miles (83 km; 52 mi) at 4 knots (7.4 km/h; 4.6 mph); when surfaced, she could travel 7,030 nautical miles (13,020 km; 8,090 mi) at 5 knots (9.3 km/h; 5.8 mph). UB-37 was fitted with two 50 centimetres (20 in) torpedo tubes, four torpedoes, and one 8.8 cm (3.5 in) Uk L/30 deck gun. She had a complement of twenty-one crew members and two officers and a 42-second dive time.

== Summary of raiding history ==
Date	Name	Nationality	Tonnage (Note: Merchant ship tonnages are in gross register tons. Military vessels are listed by tons displacement.)	Fate
21 July 1916	Samsø	Denmark	388	Damaged
22 July 1916	Bams	Norway	308	Sunk
22 July 1916	Ida	Sweden	302	Sunk
22 July 1916	Juno	Norway	355	Sunk
22 July 1916	Preference	Sweden	222	Sunk
22 July 1916	Subra	Norway	580	Sunk
9 August 1916	Danevang	Denmark	1,247	Sunk
11 August 1916	Rufus	Norway	202	Sunk
13 August 1916	Fremad	Norway	104	Sunk
13 August 1916	Pepita	Sweden	261	Sunk
13 August 1916	Respit	Norway	473	Sunk
10 September 1916	Zeemeeuv	Netherlands	400	Captured as prize
23 September 1916	Dresden	United Kingdom	807	Sunk
23 September 1916	Pearl	United Kingdom	613	Sunk
24 September 1916	Oceanien	France	60	Sunk
25 September 1916	Afrique	France	1,743	Sunk
24 October 1916	Twig	United Kingdom	128	Sunk
13 November 1916	Our Boys	United Kingdom	63	Sunk
13 November 1916	Superb	United Kingdom	50	Sunk
28 November 1916	Diligence	United Kingdom	42	Sunk
28 November 1916	Amphitrite	United Kingdom	44	Sunk
28 November 1916	Catena	United Kingdom	36	Sunk
28 November 1916	Provident	United Kingdom	38	Sunk
28 November 1916	Sea Lark	United Kingdom	42	Sunk
28 November 1916	Lynx	United Kingdom	43	Damaged
30 November 1916	Concord	United Kingdom	51	Sunk
1 December 1916	Erich Lindøe	Norway	1,097	Sunk
4 December 1916	Fofo	Greece	2,615	Sunk
6 December 1916	Halfdan	Denmark	1,305	Sunk
7 December 1916	Marguerite Dollfus	France	1,948	Sunk
5 January 1917	Asta	Norway	573	Sunk
7 January 1917	Hansi	Norway	1,142	Sunk
10 January 1917	Tuborg	Denmark	2,056	Sunk
14 January 1917	Norma	Denmark	1,997	Sunk
14 January 1917	HMS Penshurst	Royal Navy	1,191	Damaged

== Bibliography ==
- Bendert, Harald (2000). Die UB-Boote der Kaiserlichen Marine, 1914-1918. Einsätze, Erfolge, Schicksal (in German). Hamburg: Verlag E.S. Mittler & Sohn GmbH. ISBN 3-8132-0713-7.
- Gröner, Erich; Jung, Dieter; Maass, Martin (1991). U-boats and Mine Warfare Vessels. German Warships 1815–1945. Vol. 2. Translated by Thomas, Keith; Magowan, Rachel. London: Conway Maritime Press. ISBN 0-85177-593-4.
- Rössler, Eberhard (1979). Die deutschen U-Boote und ihre Werften: eine Bilddokumentation über den deutschen U-Bootbau; in zwei Bänden (in German). Vol. I. Munich: Bernard & Graefe. ISBN 3-7637-5213-7.
