= SM U-110 =

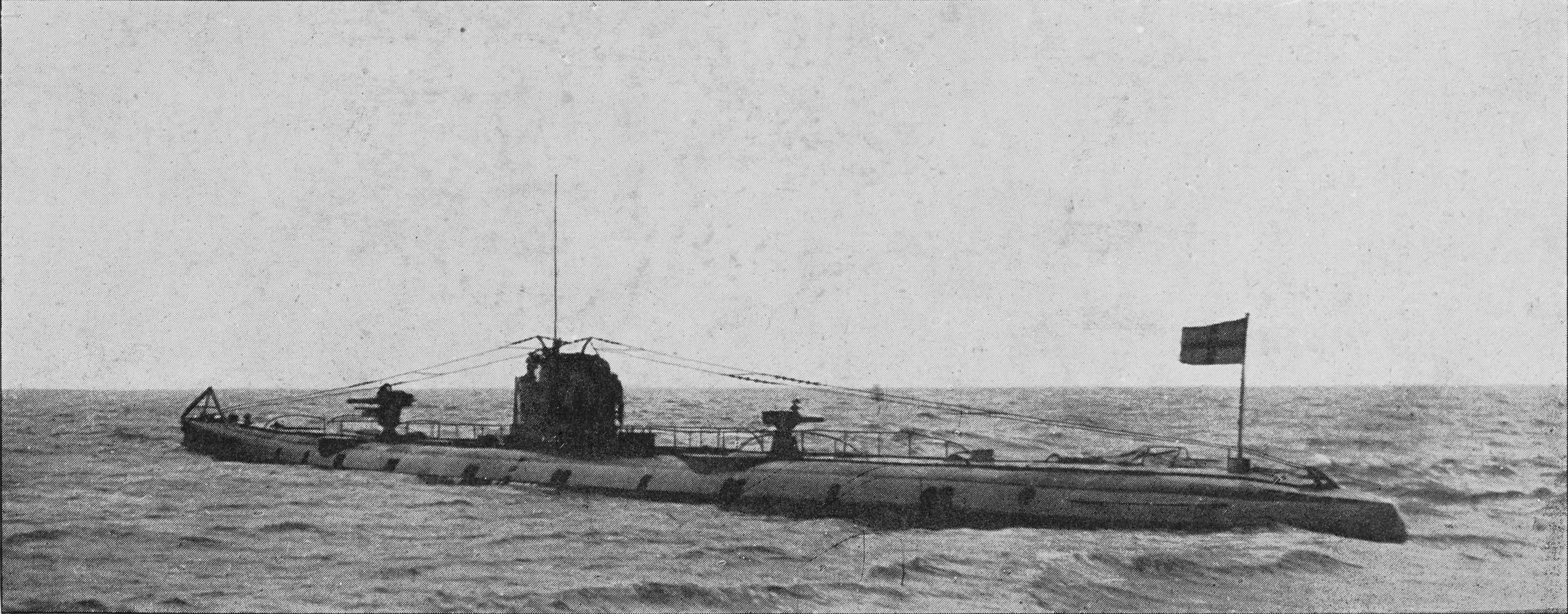
- SM U-110

History

German Empire
- Name: U-110
- Ordered: 5 May 1916
- Builder: Germaniawerft, Kiel
- Yard number: 279
- Launched: 28 July 1917
- Commissioned: 25 September 1917
- Fate: Sunk, 15 March 1918

General characteristics
- Class & type: Type U 93 submarine
- Displacement: 798 t (785 long tons) surfaced; 1,000 t (980 long tons) submerged
- Length: 71.55 m (234 ft 9 in) (o/a); 56.05 m (183 ft 11 in) (pressure hull)
- Beam: 6.30 m (20 ft 8 in) (o/a); 4.15 m (13 ft 7 in) (pressure hull)
- Height: 8.25 m (27 ft 1 in)
- Draught: 3.90 m (12 ft 10 in)
- Installed power: 2 × 2,400 PS (1,765 kW; 2,367 shp) surfaced; 2 × 1,200 PS (883 kW; 1,184 shp) submerged
- Propulsion: 2 shafts, 2 × 1.70 m (5 ft 7 in) propellers
- Speed: 16.4 knots (30.4 km/h; 18.9 mph) surfaced; 8.4 knots (15.6 km/h; 9.7 mph) submerged
- Range: 9,280 nmi (17,190 km; 10,680 mi) at 8 knots (15 km/h; 9.2 mph) surfaced; 50 nmi (93 km; 58 mi) at 5 knots (9.3 km/h; 5.8 mph) submerged
- Test depth: 50 m (164 ft 1 in)
- Complement: 4 officers, 32 enlisted
- Armament: 6 × 50 cm (19.7 in) torpedo tubes (four bow, two stern); 12-16 torpedoes; 1 × 10.5 cm (4.1 in) SK L/45 deck gun; 1 × 8.8 cm (3.5 in) SK L/30 deck gun

Service record
- Part of: IV Flotilla; 22 December 1917 – 15 March 1918
- Commanders: Kptlt. Otto von Schubert; 22 November – 10 December 1917; K.Kapt. Carl Albrecht Kroll; 12 December 1917 – 15 March 1918
- Operations: 3 patrols
- Victories: 9 merchant ships sunk (25,772 GRT); 1 auxiliary warship sunk (1,191 GRT)

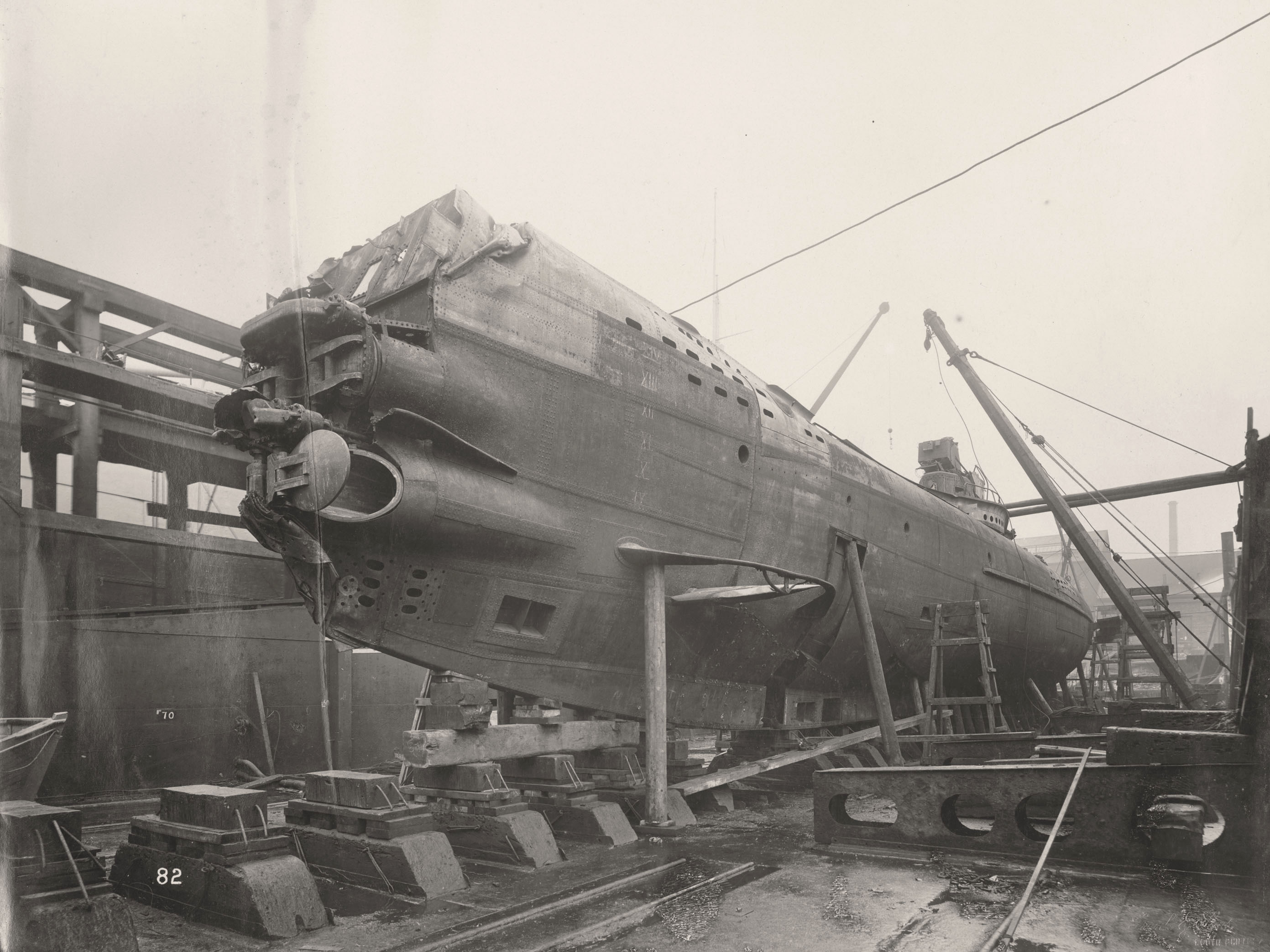
U-110, with four bow torpedo tubes and a hydroplane visible on the port side

SM U-110 was a Type U 93 U-boat of the German Imperial Navy (German: Kaiserliche Marine) during World War I. She was ordered on 5 May 1916 and launched on 28 July 1917. She was commissioned on 25 September 1917 as SM U-110. (Note: "SM" stands for "Seiner Majestät" (English: His Majesty's) and U for Unterseeboot. This translates as His Majesty's Submarine.) and assigned to IV Flotilla of the High Seas Fleet, based on the German North Sea coast.

== Service history ==
U-110 made three wartime patrols, and sank 10 ships, totalling 26,963 gross register tons (GRT). Her first success was the British Q ship Penshurst, with which she fought an engagement on 24 December 1917. Penshurst sank shortly after.

== Fate ==
U 110 was sunk on 15 March 1918 north-west of Malin Head at 55°4′N 8°6′W. She was found and depth-charged by British destroyers Michael and Moresby. 39 men were lost.

In September 1918, she was raised and taken to Swan Hunter's dry dock for restoration. At the conclusion of hostilities, restoration was halted and she was sold for scrap.

== Summary of raiding history ==
Date	Name	Nationality	Tonnage (Note: Merchant ship tonnages are in gross register tons. Military vessels are listed by tons displacement.)	Fate
24 December 1917	HMS Penshurst	Royal Navy	1,191	Sunk
30 December 1917	Zone	United Kingdom	3,914	Sunk
7 January 1918	Egda	Norway	2,527	Sunk
4 March 1918	Castle Eden	United Kingdom	1,949	Sunk
7 March 1918	RFA Vitol	Royal Navy	2,639	Sunk
7 March 1918	Tarbetnesse	United Kingdom	3,018	Sunk
8 March 1918	Erica	United Kingdom	167	Sunk
9 March 1918	Nanny Wignall	United Kingdom	93	Sunk
10 March 1918	Germaine	France	1,428	Sunk
15 March 1918	Amazon	United Kingdom	10,037	Sunk

== Bibliography ==
- Gröner, Erich; Jung, Dieter; Maass, Martin (1991). U-boats and Mine Warfare Vessels. German Warships 1815–1945. Vol. 2. Translated by Thomas, Keith; Magowan, Rachel. London: Conway Maritime Press. ISBN 0-85177-593-4.
- Kemp, Paul (1997). U-Boats Destroyed, German submarine losses in the World Wars. Arms and Armour. ISBN 1-85409-515-3.
- Tarrant, VE : The U-Boat Offensive 1914–1945 (1989) ISBN 0-85368-928-8
