= HMS Penshurst =

History

United Kingdom
- Name: Penshurst
- Launched: 1906
- Commissioned: 6 November 1915
- Fate: Sunk 25 December 1917
- Notes: Converted to Q-ship at Longhope Bay, Orkney

General characteristics
- Type: steamer
- Tonnage: 740 GRT; 1191 GT
- Displacement: 2,035 tons
- Length: 232 ft (71 m) oa
- Beam: 35 ft 2 in (10.72 m)
- Draught: 14 ft 6 in (4.42 m)
- Propulsion: steam
- Speed: 10 knots (19 km/h; 12 mph)
- Armament: 2 × 4 in guns; 2 × 12 pdr guns; 2 × 6 pdr naval guns

HMS Penshurst was a Royal Navy warship that was active during World War I. She was a Special Service Vessel (also known as Q-ships) whose function was to act as a decoy, inviting attack by a U-boat in order to engage and (if possible) destroy it. Penshurst fought a number of engagements against German U-boats during her service, and was successful on two occasions, destroying UB-19 in November 1916, and UB-37 in January 1917. Penshurst was sunk following an action with U-110 in December 1917.

== Early career ==
Penshurst was built in 1906 as a cargo steamer, and had an uneventful peacetime career before the start of World War I. In 1915 she was requisitioned by the Royal Navy for conversion into a special service vessel. She was taken in hand at Longhope, part of the Scapa Flow naval base in the Orkney Islands. She was armed with five guns originally; this was increased later in the campaign. These were a 12-pounder, two 6-pounder and two 3-pounder guns, hidden behind screens and dummy fixtures. Penshurst was manned with a volunteer crew and commanded by Commander FH Grenfell. She commissioned on 6 November 1915.

== Service history ==
Officers of the Penshurst in 1917. Grenfell is third from right and Naylor second from right

Some of the crew of Penshurst in a mixture of naval rig and Q-ship disguises. The man in the centre was a gunlayer killed in the 14 January 1917 action

Penshurst commenced operations around the North coast of Scotland before being transferred in spring 1916 to Queenstown, operating around the coast of Ireland and in the English Channel. For almost a year she had little success; during 1916 the Imperial German Navy had scaled down their U-boat operations against commerce around Britain, and there were few contacts in this theatre.

On 29 November 1916 Penshurst fell in with a U-boat which was attacking the steamer Wileyside. Penshurst was able to approach to 3,000 yards (2,700 m) before the U-boat ordered her to stop. Grenfell's crew went through their "abandon ship" evolution, putting out boats manned by a "panic party", while Penshurst stopped, waiting for the U-boat to come closer. However the U-boat declined to come closer, and with it partly hidden in the glare of the setting sun Penshurst opened fire. She got several shots off before the U-boat dived, and closed to drop depth charges on the spot, but the U-boat (which was unidentified) escaped.

The following day on 30 November Penshurst, having changed her appearance and moved to a different part of the English Channel, came upon a U-boat, UB-19 attacking the steamer Ibex. She again closed, but was overtaken by an approaching seaplane, which bombed the U-boat as it quickly submerged. When the pilot became aware of who Penshurst was he landed, and agreed to spot for her while she dropped depth charges. However, on take-off the seaplane went out of control and crashed into the sea. As Penshurst stopped to pick up the crew, the U-boat, thinking it was safe, came to the surface again to attack. Taking the opportunity, Grenfell waited until the U-boat drew nearer, then opened fire. UB-19 was fatally damaged and sank. Grenfell was awarded the Distinguished Service Order (DSO) for this achievement.

On 14 January Penshurst was able to repeat her success. Two months later she was on patrol in the Channel when she encountered a U-boat, UB-37. The U-boat closed in, opening fire at 3,000 yards. Grenfell sent off his panic party, and allowed Penshurst to turn as she slowed, to be broadside-on to the U-boat. However, the U-boat made to cross Penshurst's bow, continuing to fire, causing damage and several casualties over a twenty-minute period. At length, when no further advantage could be gained, Penshurst opened fire, and scored several hits with her first shots. UB-37 was crippled and started to sink, and Penshurst finished her attack by dropping depth charges over the site. UB-37 was destroyed, with no survivors.

On 20 February Penshurst again encountered a U-boat in the Southwest Approaches. She was again attacked, and after the U-boat closed was able to fire on her, causing damage. The U-boat submerged and was depth charged, but on this occasion was able to escape, returning to base despite the damage.

Two days later on 22 February Penshurst again met with a U-boat, U-84, which had just sunk the sailing ship Invercauld. As Penshurst drew up to pick up Invercauld's survivors, U-84 fired a torpedo at her, which was narrowly avoided. Penshurst then feigned running, but at half speed, and, as the U-boat opened fire, sent off her boat party. U-84 submerged to examine Penshurst in safety, but was satisfied, surfacing 600 yards (550 m) away. Penshurst was then able to open fire, damaging the U-boat, and dropping depth charges as she submerged. As she did this, Penshurst was joined by the sloop Alyssum, which joined the attack. However, U-84 was able to surface, away from the two hunters, and fled on the surface, outstripping her two pursuers.

The following month, on 30 March, Penshurst again encountered a U-boat, UB-32, but on this occasion the U-boat was able to inflict severe damage to her before escaping. Penshurst was towed back to Portsmouth where she was docked for repairs and a refit.

On 2 July, back in service and under a new commander, Lieutenant C Naylor, Penshurst was again in the Southwest Approaches when she fell in with another U-boat. The boat submerged as Penshurst approached and fired a torpedo, which missed. Naylor sent his boat party off, and then waited for the U-boat to come into range. Penshurst was under fire for some thirty minutes until she was able to open fire herself. The U-boat was damaged, but again was able to escape, despite the arrival of a group of destroyers. For this action, and his resolution under fire, Naylor received the DSO.

On 19 August Penshurst was following up a report from a merchantman when she fell in with UC-72. As she approached, the U-boat fired a torpedo, which struck below the bridge. As the boat surfaced, Penshurst fired using a 3 pdr gun she carried in plain sight. By this stage of the campaign many merchant ships were defensively armed, and a Q-ship would look suspicious if she did not do the same. It was a further development in the process of bluff and double-bluff which typified the Q-ship campaign. However UC-72 was not fooled by this lacklustre response, and Penshurt was not fully under control, so Naylor refrained from sending off his boat party, but opened fire with all guns. He had also sent a distress call, and after a short time was joined by the destroyer Leonidas. At this UC-72 submerged and fled.

Penshurst, escorted by Leonidas then made her way back to Plymouth, where she remained in dock for repair and refit. One of the changes was to improve her armament, adding two 4-inch guns and upgrading to two 12 pdr and two 6 pdr guns. These were re-positioned to give more firepower over the bow and stern. These changes were to take account of the changes in U-boat armament and tactics.

== Fate ==
On 24 December 1917 Penshurst was again on patrol in the southern part of the Irish Sea, when she encountered a U-boat off The Smalls. The boat, U-110, submerged in order to let Penshurst come into range, and just after midday fired a torpedo, which hit her in the engine room. Naylor sent his boat crew off, but U-110 remained under for two hours, examining the ship, until she surfaced off Penshurst's bow and commenced shelling. Penshurst replied, but was unable to bring all her guns to bear, as she was down by the stern. She scored some hits, but U-110 submerged again, and, when a Royal Navy submarine chaser arrived around 4 pm, made off, having suffered little damage.

Penshurst, however, was seriously damaged, and despite attempts to bring her home, she sank at 8.05 pm. All her crew were successfully removed, though stoker 1st class Albert Brewer died later the same day. Naylor was awarded a second bar to his DSO for this action.

Penshurst was one of the Royal Navy's most successful Q-ships, fighting eleven engagements over a two-year period, and destroying two U-boats and damaging several others in that time.
