= SM U-4 (Austria-Hungary) =

Austro-Hungarian Navy's U-3-class submarine

- U-4 in Pola in 1913

History

Austria-Hungary
- Name: SM U-4
- Ordered: 1906
- Builder: Friedrich Krupp Germaniawerft, Kiel
- Yard number: 136
- Laid down: 12 March 1907
- Launched: 20 November 1908
- Commissioned: 29 August 1909
- Fate: Ceded to France as war reparation and scrapped, 1920

Service record
- Commanders: Lothar Leschanowsky; 29 August – 17 September 1910; 29 April – 21 September 1911; Rudolf Singule; 21 September 1912 – 7 July 1913; Hermann Jüstel; 7 July 1913 – 2 April 1915; Edgar Wolf; 2 – 9 April 1915; Rudolf Singule; 9 April 1915 – 30 November 1917; Franz Rzemenowsky von Trautenegg; 30 November 1917 – 1 July 1918
- Victories: 8 merchant ships sunk (12,673 GRT); 4 warships sunk (7,345 tons); 3 auxiliary warships sunk (2,255 GRT); 1 merchant ship damaged (3,498 GRT); 2 warships damaged (5,437 tons); 3 merchant ships taken as prize (16 GRT + Unknown GRT)

General characteristics
- Class & type: U-3-class submarine
- Displacement: 240 t surfaced; 300 t submerged
- Length: 138 ft 9 in (42.29 m)
- Beam: 14 ft (4.3 m)
- Draft: 12 ft 6 in (3.81 m)
- Propulsion: 2 × shafts; 2 × kerosene 4-cylinder two-stroke engines, 600 bhp (450 kW) total; 2 × electric motors, 320 shp (240 kW) total
- Speed: 12 knots (22 km/h) surfaced; 8.5 knots (15.7 km/h) submerged
- Range: 1,200 nmi (2,200 km) at 12 knots (22 km/h), surfaced; 40 nmi (74 km) at 3 knots (5.6 km/h), submerged
- Complement: 21
- Armament: 2 × 45 cm (17.7 in) torpedo tubes (both front); 3 torpedoes

SM U-4 or U-IV was a U-3-class submarine or U-boat built for and operated by the Austro-Hungarian Navy (German: Kaiserliche und Königliche Kriegsmarine or K.u.K. Kriegsmarine) before and during the First World War. The submarine was built as part of a plan to evaluate foreign submarine designs, and was the second of two boats of the class built by Germaniawerft of Kiel, Germany.

U-4 was authorized in 1906, begun in March 1907, launched in November 1908, and towed from Kiel to Pola in April 1909. The double-hulled submarine was just under 139 feet (42 m) long and displaced between 240 and 300 tonnes (260 and 330 short tons), depending on whether surfaced or submerged. The design of the submarine had poor diving qualities and several modifications to U-4's diving planes and fins occurred in her first years in the Austro-Hungarian Navy. Her armament, as built, consisted of two bow torpedo tubes with a supply of three torpedoes, but was supplemented with a deck gun, the first of which was added in 1915.

The boat was commissioned into the Austro-Hungarian Navy in August 1909, and served as a training boat—sometimes making as many as ten cruises a month—through the beginning of the First World War in 1914. At the start of that conflict, she was one of only four operational submarines in the Austro-Hungarian Navy U-boat fleet. Over the first year of the war, U-4 made several unsuccessful attacks on warships and captured several smaller vessels as prizes. In July 1915, she scored what Conway's All the World's Fighting Ships 1906–1921 calls her greatest success when she torpedoed and sank the Italian armored cruiser Giuseppe Garibaldi, the largest ship hit by U-4 during the war.

In mid-May 1917, U-4 was a participant in a raid on the Otranto Barrage which precipitated the Battle of Otranto Straits. In a separate action that same month, U-4 sank her second largest ship, the Italian troopship Perseo. She scored her final success in July 1917 with the sinking of a French tug. In total, U-4 sank fifteen ships totaling 14,928 gross register tons (GRT) and 7,345 tons. She survived the war as Austria-Hungary's longest serving submarine, was ceded to France as a war reparation, and scrapped in 1920.

== Design and construction ==
U-4 was built as part of a plan by the Austro-Hungarian Navy to competitively evaluate foreign submarine designs from Simon Lake, Germaniawerft, and John Philip Holland. The Austro-Hungarian Navy authorized the construction of U-4 (and sister ship, U-3) in 1906 by Germaniawerft of Kiel, Germany. U-4 was laid down on 12 March 1907 and launched on 20 November 1908. (Note: In their book The German Submarine War, 1914–1918, R. H. Gibson and Maurice Prendergast report that U-4 was launched in 1909 (p. 384).) After completion, she was towed via Gibraltar to Pola, where she arrived on 19 April 1909.

U-4's design was an improved version of Germaniawerft's design for the Imperial German Navy's first U-boat, U-1, and featured a double hull with internal saddle tanks. The Germaniawerft engineers refined the design's hull shape through extensive model trials.

U-4 was 138 feet 9 inches (42 m) long by 14 feet (4.3 m) abeam and had a draft of 12 feet 6 inches (3.81 m). She displaced 240 tonnes (260 short tons) surfaced and 300 tonnes (330 short tons) submerged. She was armed with two bow 45-centimeter (17.7 in) torpedo tubes, and was designed to carry up to three torpedoes.

== Early career ==
After U-4's arrival at Pola in April 1909, she was commissioned into the Austro-Hungarian Navy on 29 August 1909 as SM U-4. During the evaluation of the U-3 class conducted by the Navy, the class' poor diving and handling characteristics were noted. To alleviate the diving problems, U-4's fins were changed in size and shape several times, and eventually, the front diving planes were removed and a stationary stern flap was affixed to the hull. (Note: These same remedies were applied to U-4's sister ship U-3.) U-4 served as a training boat between 1910 and 1914 and made as many as ten cruises per month in that capacity.

== World War I ==
=== 1914–1916 ===
At the beginning of World War I, she was one of only four operational submarines in the Austro-Hungarian Navy. On 27 September 1914, U-4 began operating reconnaissance cruises out of the naval base at Cattaro under the command of Linienschiffsleutnant Hermann Jüstel. U-4 attacked the cruiser Waldeck-Rousseau on 17 October, but the French vessel escaped without serious damage. In late November, U-4 seized the 13 GRT Albanian sailing vessel Fiore del Mar as a prize off Montenegro. U-4 received her first radio set the following month.

U-4's next success was the capture of three Montenegrin boats on 19 February 1915. Rudolf Singule, who was to become U-4's most successful commander, assumed command of the boat in April 1915. (Note: It was Singule's second stint in command of U-4; he had also been the boat's commanding officer from September 1912 to July 1913.) Around the same time, the boat was equipped with a 3.7-centimeter (1.5 in) quick firing (QF) deck gun. On 24 May, in the Gulf of Drin, U-4 unsuccessfully attacked an Italian Lombardia-class cruiser, but on 9 June, Singule spotted the British cruiser Dublin escorting a convoy along the Montenegrin coast. Despite a screen of six destroyers, U-4 was able to torpedo Dublin off San Giovanni de Medua. Twelve men on Dublin died in the attack, but the cruiser made her way safely, albeit damaged, back to port.

On 18 July, U-4 chanced upon an Italian squadron of ships shelling the railroads at Dubrovnik. Singule selected the Italian armored cruiser Giuseppe Garibaldi as a target and torpedoed her. Giuseppe Garibaldi—at 7,234 tons, the largest ship sunk by U-4—sank with a loss of 53 men; 525 men survived. Conway's All the World's Fighting Ships 1906–1921 calls the sinking of Giuseppe Garibaldi as U-4's greatest success. In August, she was sent out to search for her missing sister ship, U-3, which was overdue, having been sunk on 13 August by the French destroyer Bisson. In November, U-4 made an unsuccessful attack on a British Topaze-class cruiser. In early December, U-4 dispatched two small Albanian vessels in the Gulf of Drin. The 10 GRT sailing vessel Papagallo was sunk, and the Gjovadje was taken as a prize. New periscopes and a new gyrocompass were installed on U-4 later in the month. On 3 January 1916, operating again near the Gulf of Drin, Singule and U-4 seized another Albanian sailing vessel, Halil, and sank two smaller boats.

In early February, U-4 sank the 475 GRT French patrol vessel Jean Bart 6 nautical miles (11 km) southwest of Cape Laghi, off Durazzo. (Note: This Jean Bart is not the French dreadnought Jean Bart which was damaged by the Austro-Hungarian submarine U-12 on 21 December 1914. See: Gibson and Prendergast, p. 69.) Just five days later, U-4 made an unsuccessful attack on a British Birmingham-class cruiser. Over 26 and 27 March, U-4 participated in a search for the lost Austro-Hungarian submarine U-24. (Note: The Austro-Hungarian submarine U-24, was, in fact, the German Imperial Navy submarine UC-12 operating under the Austro-Hungarian flag (see Gardiner, p. 341). UC-12, a coastal minelaying submarine, was destroyed on 12 March 1916 when the crew deployed the boat's tenth mine, which malfunctioned and exploded, sinking the U-boat with all hands. See: Messimer, Dwight R. (2002). Verschollen: World War I U-boat Losses. Annapolis, Maryland: Naval Institute Press. p. 249. ISBN 978-1-55750-475-3. OCLC 231973419.) Three days later, U-4 sank the British schooner John Pritchard Of Carnar with explosive charges off the island of Antipaxos. In July, U-4 was outfitted with a new 66 mm (2.6 in) deck gun, which equaled the main gun planned for the U-20 class, under construction at the time.

On 2 August, U-4 missed an Italian Nino Bixio-class cruiser in a torpedo attack, and three days later, was missed by two torpedoes in an attack by an enemy submarine. A week later, U-4 successfully torpedoed and sank the Italian schooner Ponte Maria off Brindisi and weathered another unsuccessful enemy submarine attack. Two days later, on 14 August, U-4 closed out her busy month of August by attacking the British steamer Inverbervie off Cape Nau. (Note: Sieche (p. 21) reports that a ship named Inverberbie was sunk by U-4 on that date. Haworth reports no ships of any nationality of the name Inverberbie, but one British ship by the name Inverbervie. Helgason shows the same Inverbervie as either being sunk by U-4 or by a mine laid by the German U-boat UC-14 on 14 September 1916, which is the same fate reported by Haworth. For Haworth, see: "Inverbervie (159996)". Miramar Ship Index. For Helgason, see:Helgason, Guðmundur. "Ships hit during WWI: Inverbervie". German and Austrian U-boats of World War I - Kaiserliche Marine - Uboat.net.) Some two months later, U-4 sank the Italian tanker Margaretha at position 40°1′N 17°44′E. Margaretha, originally the J.M.Lennard & Sons ship Atilla, went down without any reported loss of life on 13 October.

=== 1917–1918 ===
In early May 1917, U-4 sank the steamer Perseo—the second largest ship sunk by the boat—in the Ionian Sea. Although Perseo was serving as an Italian troop transport at the time, there are no reports of casualties in the 4 May attack. In mid-May 1917, U-4 participated in a support role in a raid on the Otranto Barrage that precipitated the Battle of Otranto Straits. On the night of 14/15 May, the Austro-Hungarian cruisers Helgoland, Saida, and Novara attacked the drifters that deployed the anti-submarine nets that formed part of the Barrage, sinking 14, damaging 5, and taking 72 prisoners. (Note: Joseph Watt, the commander of the British drifter Gowan Lea, was awarded the Victoria Cross for his actions in refusing to surrender to one of the Austrian cruisers.) Destroyers Csepel and Balaton were sent to simultaneously attack Italian transports shuttling between Italy and Valona, and sank an Italian destroyer and a munitions ship. U-4, which was posted near Valona, was a part of a force of three U-boats intended to intercept British and Italian ships responding to the attacks; the other two were the Austro-Hungarian U-27 (assigned to patrol between Brindisi and Cattaro) and the German UC-25 (assigned to mine Brindisi). A squadron of British cruisers and Italian and French destroyers joined the battle against the Austro-Hungarian cruisers on 15 May. Several ships on each side were damaged by the time the engagement was broken off. As a result of the attacks the drifter line of the Barrage was moved farther south and maintained only during the day, a success for the Central Powers. U-4 did not take any offensive action during the raid and ensuing battle.

On 30 May at Corfu, U-4 torpedoed and sank the French passenger steamer SS Italia, in operation by the French Navy as an armed boarding ship. On 19 June, U-4 scored a triple victory when she sank the French steamers Edouarde Corbière and Cefira and the Greek ship Kerkyra off Taranto. U-4 sank what would be her final ship on 12 July, when she torpedoed the French tug Berthilde off Cape Stilo. In September, U-4 received a new bulwark on her conning tower.

U-4 arrived at Pola for the final time on 1 November 1918 and was there at the war's end. She was ceded to France as a war reparation and scrapped in 1920. U-4 was the longest serving Austro-Hungarian submarine, and sank a total of 14,928 GRT and 7,345 tons enemy shipping during the war.

== Summary of raiding history ==
Date	Name	Nationality	Tonnage (Note: Merchant ship tonnages are in gross register tons. Military vessels are listed by tons displacement.)	Fate
28 November 1914	Fiore Del Mare	Albania	13	Captured as prize
9 June 1915	HMS Dublin	Royal Navy	5,400	Damaged
18 July 1915	Giuseppe Garibaldi	Regia Marina	7,234	Sunk
9 December 1915	Gjovadje	Albania	—N/a	Captured as prize
9 December 1915	Papagallo	Albania	10	Sunk
3 January 1916	Halil	Albania	3	Captured as prize
2 February 1916	Jean Bart II	French Navy	475	Sunk
30 March 1916	John Pritchard	United Kingdom	118	Sunk
14 August 1916	Pantellaria	Kingdom of Italy	204	Sunk
14 September 1916	HMML 255	Royal Navy	37	Sunk
14 September 1916	HMML 253	Royal Navy	37	Sunk
14 September 1916	HMML 230	Royal Navy	37	Sunk
14 September 1916	Italia	Kingdom of Italy	3,498	Damaged
14 September 1916	HMML 246	Royal Navy	37	Damaged
14 September 1916	Inverbervie	United Kingdom	4,309	Sunk
13 October 1916	Margaretha	Kingdom of Italy	2,092	Sunk
4 May 1917	Perseo	Kingdom of Italy	4,857	Sunk
30 May 1917	Italia	French Navy	1,305	Sunk
19 June 1917	Edouard Corbiere	French Navy	475	Sunk
19 June 1917	Cefira	France	411	Sunk
12 July 1917	Berthilde	France	672	Sunk

== Bibliography ==
- Baumgartner, Lothar; Erwin Sieche (1999). Die Schiffe der k.(u.)k. Kriegsmarine im Bild = Austro-Hungarian warships in photographs (in German). Wien: Verlagsbuchhandlung Stöhr. ISBN 978-3-901208-25-6. OCLC 43596931.
- Gardiner, Robert; Gray, Randal, eds. (1985). Conway's All the World's Fighting Ships 1906–1921. Annapolis, Maryland: Naval Institute Press. ISBN 978-0-87021-907-8. OCLC 12119866.
- Gibson, R. H.; Prendergast, Maurice (2003) [1931]. The German Submarine War, 1914–1918. Annapolis, Maryland: Naval Institute Press. ISBN 978-1-59114-314-7. OCLC 52924732.
- Halpern, Paul G. (1994). A Naval History of World War I. Annapolis, Maryland: Naval Institute Press. ISBN 978-0-87021-266-6. OCLC 28411665.
- Kemp, Paul (1997). U-boats destroyed : German submarine losses in the World Wars. Annapolis, Maryland: Naval Institute Press. ISBN 978-1-55750-859-1. OCLC 37460046.
- Sieche, Erwin F. (1980). "Austro-Hungarian Submarines". Warship, Volume 2. Naval Institute Press. ISBN 978-0-87021-976-4. OCLC 233144055.
