= SM UC-16 =

German submarine

History

German Empire
- Name: UC-16
- Ordered: 29 August 1915
- Builder: Blohm & Voss, Hamburg
- Yard number: 266
- Launched: 1 February 1916
- Commissioned: 18 June 1916
- Fate: Probably sunk by mine in 4 October 1917

General characteristics
- Class & type: Type UC II submarine
- Displacement: 417 t (410 long tons), surfaced; 493 t (485 long tons), submerged
- Length: 49.35 m (161 ft 11 in) o/a; 39.30 m (128 ft 11 in) pressure hull
- Beam: 5.22 m (17 ft 2 in) o/a; 3.65 m (12 ft) pressure hull
- Draught: 3.68 m (12 ft 1 in)
- Propulsion: 2 × propeller shafts; 2 × 6-cylinder, 4-stroke diesel engines, 500 PS (370 kW; 490 bhp); 2 × electric motors, 460 PS (340 kW; 450 shp)
- Speed: 11.6 knots (21.5 km/h; 13.3 mph), surfaced; 7.0 knots (13.0 km/h; 8.1 mph), submerged
- Range: 9,430 nautical miles (17,460 km; 10,850 mi) at 7 knots (13 km/h; 8.1 mph), surfaced; 55 nautical miles (102 km; 63 mi) at 4 knots (7.4 km/h; 4.6 mph), submerged
- Test depth: 50 m (160 ft)
- Complement: 26
- Armament: 6 × 100 cm (39.4 in) mine tubes; 18 × UC 200 mines; 3 × 50 cm (19.7 in) torpedo tubes (2 bow/external; one stern); 7 × torpedoes; 1 × 8.8 cm (3.5 in) Uk L/30 deck gun
- Notes: 35-second diving time

Service record
- Part of: Flandern / Flandern I Flotilla; 11 September 1916 – 4 October 1917
- Commanders: Oblt.z.S. Egon von Werner; 26 June 1916 – 22 April 1917; Oblt.z.S. Georg Reimarus; 15 July – 4 October 1917
- Operations: 13 patrols
- Victories: 43 merchant ships sunk (43,914 GRT); 4 merchant ships damaged (24,465 GRT); 2 auxiliary warships damaged (419 GRT)

SM UC-16 was a German Type UC II minelaying submarine or U-boat in the German Imperial Navy (German: Kaiserliche Marine) during World War I. The U-boat was ordered on 29 August 1915 and was launched on 1 February 1916. She was commissioned into the German Imperial Navy on 18 June 1916 as SM UC-16. (Note: "SM" stands for "Seiner Majestät" (English: His Majesty's) and combined with the U for Unterseeboot would be translated as His Majesty's Submarine.) In 13 patrols UC-16 was credited with sinking 43 ships, either by torpedo or by mines laid. UC-16 disappeared in October 1917. A postwar German study concluded that UC-16 probably sank after striking a mine off Zeebrugge

== Design ==
Like all pre-UC-25 Type UC II submarines, UC-16 had a displacement of 417 tonnes (410 long tons) when at the surface and 493 tonnes (485 long tons) while submerged. She had a total length of 49.35 m (161 ft 11 in), beam of 5.22 m (17 ft 2 in), and a draught of 3.65 m (12 ft). The submarine was powered by two six-cylinder four-stroke diesel engines each producing 500 metric horsepower (370 kW; 490 shp) (a total of 1,000 metric horsepower (740 kW; 990 shp)), two electric motors producing 460 metric horsepower (340 kW; 450 shp), and two propeller shafts. She had a dive time of 35 seconds and was capable of operating at a depth of 50 metres (160 ft).

The submarine had a maximum surface speed of 11.6 knots (21.5 km/h; 13.3 mph) and a submerged speed of 7 knots (13 km/h; 8.1 mph). When submerged, she could operate for 55 nautical miles (102 km; 63 mi) at 4 knots (7.4 km/h; 4.6 mph); when surfaced, she could travel 9,430 nautical miles (17,460 km; 10,850 mi) at 7 knots (13 km/h; 8.1 mph). UC-16 was fitted with six 100 centimetres (39 in) mine tubes, eighteen UC 200 mines, three 50 centimetres (20 in) torpedo tubes (one on the stern and two on the bow), seven torpedoes, and one 8.8 cm (3.5 in) Uk L/30 deck gun. Her complement was twenty-six crew members.

== Summary of raiding history ==
Date	Name	Nationality	Tonnage (Note: Merchant ship tonnages are in gross register tons. Military vessels are listed by tons displacement.)	Fate
23 September 1916	Andromeda	United Kingdom	149	Sunk
23 September 1916	Beechwold	United Kingdom	129	Sunk
23 September 1916	Britannia III	United Kingdom	138	Sunk
23 September 1916	Cockatrice	United Kingdom	115	Sunk
23 September 1916	Mercury	United Kingdom	183	Sunk
23 September 1916	Phoenix	United Kingdom	117	Sunk
23 September 1916	Refino	United Kingdom	182	Sunk
23 September 1916	Rego	United Kingdom	176	Sunk
23 September 1916	Restless	United Kingdom	125	Sunk
23 September 1916	Viella	United Kingdom	144	Sunk
23 September 1916	Weelsby	United Kingdom	122	Sunk
19 October 1916	Alaunia	United Kingdom	13,405	Sunk
22 October 1916	Fortuna	Netherlands	1,254	Sunk
11 November 1916	Daphne	Norway	1,388	Sunk
11 November 1916	Veronica	United Kingdom	27	Sunk
13 November 1916	Marie Therese	France	156	Sunk
14 November 1916	N.D. De Bon Secours	France	81	Sunk
14 November 1916	Nominoe	France	327	Sunk
14 November 1916	Salangane	France	125	Sunk
16 November 1916	Lelia	France	79	Sunk
16 November 1916	Vasco	United Kingdom	1,914	Sunk
26 November 1916	Caloric	Norway	7,012	Damaged
28 December 1916	Suffolk	United Kingdom	7,573	Damaged
30 December 1916	Aspenleaf	United Kingdom	7,535	Damaged
18 January 1917	Taormina	Kingdom of Italy	2,457	Sunk
19 January 1917	Anna	Norway	1,237	Sunk
19 January 1917	Reinunga	Norway	1,147	Sunk
19 January 1917	Theresdal	Norway	1,762	Sunk
21 January 1917	Couronne	France	169	Sunk
22 January 1917	Juno	Netherlands	2,345	Damaged
23 January 1917	Ymer	Norway	1,123	Sunk
15 February 1917	Leven	United Kingdom	775	Sunk
26 February 1917	Sea Gull	United Kingdom	144	Sunk
26 February 1917	HMT St. Germain	Royal Navy	307	Damaged
15 March 1917	Coonagh	United Kingdom	1,412	Sunk
20 April 1917	HMS Glen	Royal Navy	112	Damaged
27 July 1917	Dirk	Netherlands	81	Sunk
27 July 1917	Dirk van Duyne	Netherlands	116	Sunk
27 July 1917	Jan	Netherlands	104	Sunk
27 July 1917	Majoor Thomson	Netherlands	110	Sunk
27 July 1917	President Commissaris van den Burgh	Netherlands	111	Sunk
27 July 1917	Sterna III	Netherlands	111	Sunk
28 July 1917	Neptunus I	Netherlands	80	Sunk
16 August 1917	Manchester Engineer	United Kingdom	4,465	Sunk
17 August 1917	Susie	United Kingdom	41	Sunk
18 August 1917	Ardens	United Kingdom	1,274	Sunk
4 September 1917	Bishopston	United Kingdom	2,513	Sunk
7 September 1917	Hinemoa	United Kingdom	2,283	Sunk
7 September 1917	Vestfjeld	Norway	2,063	Sunk
