= SM U-57 =

German Submarine

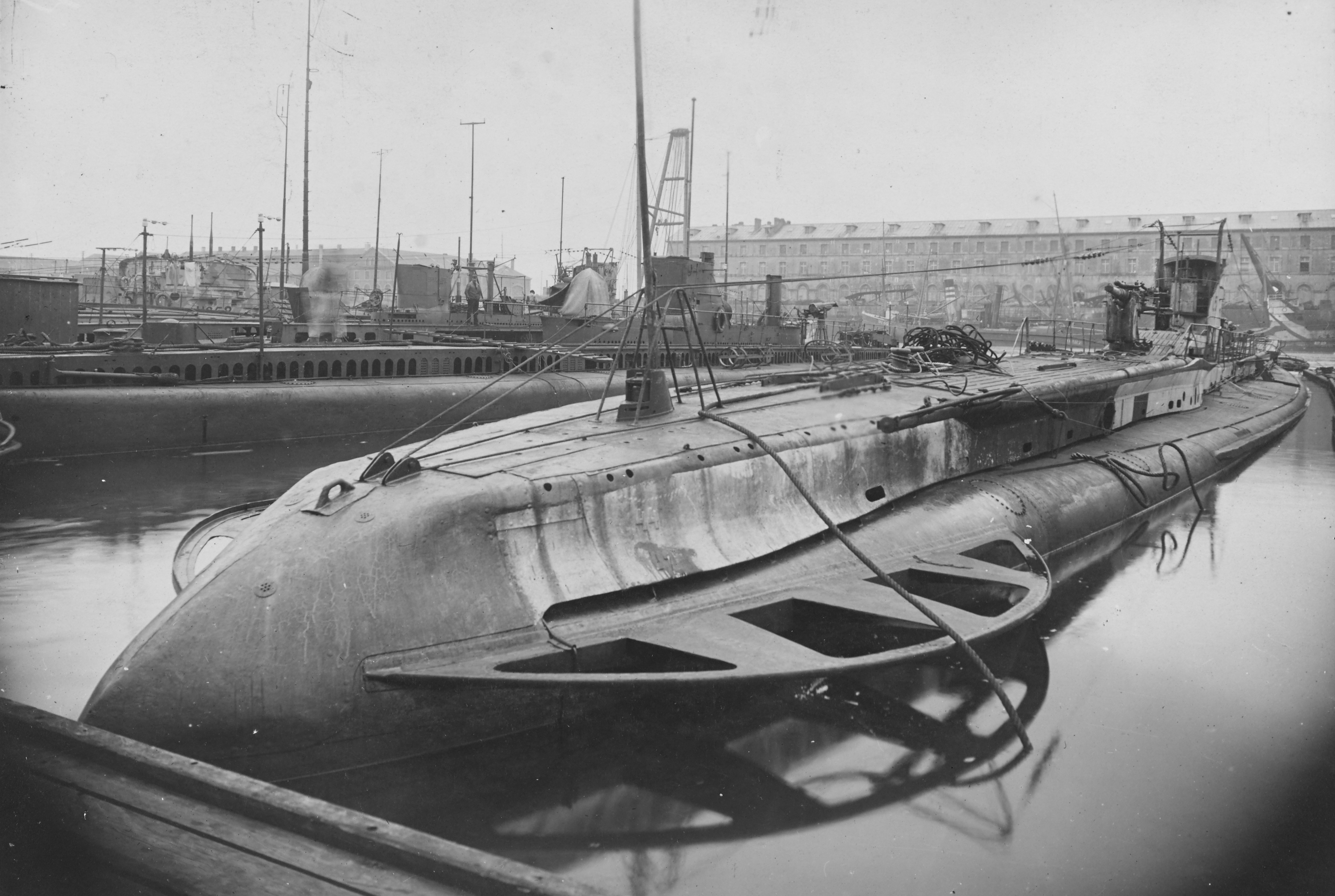
- U-57 in Cherbourg circa 1920

History

German Empire
- Name: U-57
- Ordered: 6 October 1914
- Builder: A.G. Weser, Bremen
- Yard number: 212
- Laid down: 25 August 1915
- Launched: 29 April 1916
- Commissioned: 6 July 1916
- Fate: 24 November 1918 - Surrendered to France. Broken up at Cherbourg in 1921.

General characteristics
- Class & type: Type U 57 submarine
- Displacement: 786 t (774 long tons) surfaced; 956 t (941 long tons) submerged
- Length: 67.00 m (219 ft 10 in) (o/a); 54.22 m (177 ft 11 in) (pressure hull)
- Beam: 6.32 m (20 ft 9 in) (oa); 4.05 m (13 ft 3 in) (pressure hull)
- Height: 8.05 m (26 ft 5 in)
- Draught: 3.79 m (12 ft 5 in)
- Installed power: 2 × 1,800 PS (1,324 kW; 1,775 shp) surfaced; 2 × 1,200 PS (883 kW; 1,184 shp) submerged
- Propulsion: 2 shafts
- Speed: 14.7 knots (27.2 km/h; 16.9 mph) surfaced; 8.4 knots (15.6 km/h; 9.7 mph) submerged
- Range: 7,730 nmi (14,320 km; 8,900 mi) at 8 knots (15 km/h; 9.2 mph) surfaced; 55 nmi (102 km; 63 mi) at 5 knots (9.3 km/h; 5.8 mph) submerged
- Test depth: 50 m (164 ft 1 in)
- Complement: 36
- Armament: 4 × 50 cm (19.7 in) torpedo tubes (two bow, two stern); 7 torpedoes; 1 × 10.5 cm (4.1 in) SK L/45 deck gun

Service record
- Part of: II Flotilla; 7 July 1916 – 11 November 1918
- Commanders: Kptlt. Carl-Siegfried Ritter von Georg; 6 July 1916 – 19 December 1917; Oblt.z.S. Günther Sperling; 20 December 1917 - 6 March 1918; Oblt.z.S. Walter Stein; 7 March – 11 November 1918
- Operations: 7 patrols
- Victories: 55 merchant ships sunk (91,606 GRT); 1 warship sunk (1,250 tons); 6 merchant ships damaged (14,363 GRT); 1 auxiliary warship damaged (1,372 GRT)

SM U-57 was one of the 329 submarines serving in the Imperial German Navy in World War I. U-57 was engaged in naval warfare and took part in the First Battle of the Atlantic.

== Summary of raiding history ==
Date	Name	Nationality	Tonnage (Note: Merchant ship tonnages are in gross register tons. Military vessels are listed by tons displacement.)	Fate
24 September 1916	Ranee	United Kingdom	194	Damaged
24 September 1916	Albatross	United Kingdom	158	Sunk
24 September 1916	Aphelion	United Kingdom	197	Sunk
24 September 1916	Briton	United Kingdom	134	Sunk
24 September 1916	Devonshire	United Kingdom	148	Sunk
24 September 1916	Laila	Norway	807	Sunk
24 September 1916	Marguerite	United Kingdom	151	Sunk
24 September 1916	Otter	United Kingdom	123	Sunk
24 September 1916	Sunshine	United Kingdom	185	Sunk
24 September 1916	Tarantula	United Kingdom	155	Sunk
24 September 1916	Otterhound	United Kingdom	150	Sunk
25 September 1916	Cynthia	United Kingdom	133	Sunk
25 September 1916	Fisher Prince	United Kingdom	125	Sunk
25 September 1916	Gamecock	United Kingdom	151	Sunk
25 September 1916	Harrier	United Kingdom	162	Sunk
25 September 1916	Loch Ness	United Kingdom	176	Sunk
25 September 1916	Nil Desperandum	United Kingdom	148	Sunk
25 September 1916	Quebec	United Kingdom	133	Sunk
25 September 1916	Seal	United Kingdom	135	Sunk
25 September 1916	St. Hilda	United Kingdom	94	Sunk
25 September 1916	Trinidad	United Kingdom	147	Sunk
23 October 1916	HMS Genista	Royal Navy	1,250	Sunk
26 October 1916	Rowanmore	United Kingdom	10,320	Sunk
30 October 1916	Floreal	United Kingdom	163	Sunk
31 October 1916	Saturn	Norway	1,108	Sunk
18 January 1917	Manchester Inventor	United Kingdom	4,247	Sunk
22 January 1917	Euphrates	Belgium	2,809	Sunk
22 January 1917	Minho	Portugal	179	Sunk
22 January 1917	Trevean	United Kingdom	3,081	Sunk
26 January 1917	Bisagno	Italy	2,252	Sunk
22 March 1917	Sirius	Norway	1,053	Sunk
27 March 1917	Holgate	United Kingdom	2,604	Sunk
28 March 1917	Gafsa	United Kingdom	3,974	Sunk
29 March 1917	Crispin	United Kingdom	3,965	Sunk
29 March 1917	Lincolnshire	United Kingdom	3,965	Sunk
30 March 1917	HMS Lady Patricia	Royal Navy	1,372	Damaged
31 March 1917	Braefield	United Kingdom	427	Sunk
5 April 1917	Ebenezer	Denmark	181	Sunk
12 May 1917	Refugio	United Kingdom	2,642	Sunk
14 May 1917	Arlington Court	United Kingdom	4,346	Damaged
19 May 1917	Farnham	United Kingdom	3,102	Sunk
24 May 1917	Belgian	United Kingdom	3,657	Sunk
1 June 1917	Teal	United Kingdom	141	Sunk
2 July 1917	May Flower	Sweden	55	Sunk
5 July 1917	Cuyahoga	United Kingdom	4,586	Sunk
7 July 1917	Tarquah	United Kingdom	3,859	Sunk
8 July 1917	Pegu	United Kingdom	6,348	Sunk
10 July 1917	Garmoyle	United Kingdom	1,229	Sunk
16 July 1917	Benguela	United Kingdom	5,530	Damaged
8 October 1917	Aylevarroo	United Kingdom	908	Sunk
8 October 1917	Richard De Larrinaga	United Kingdom	5,591	Sunk
12 October 1917	Cape Corso	United Kingdom	3,890	Damaged
12 October 1917	Georgios Markettos	Greece	2,269	Sunk
13 October 1917	Diu	Portugal	5,556	Sunk
14 October 1917	East Wales	United Kingdom	4,321	Sunk
20 October 1917	Norden	Sweden	703	Sunk
28 November 1917	Perm	Denmark	1,312	Sunk
29 November 1917	Pierre	France	112	Sunk
30 November 1917	Courage	United Kingdom	51	Sunk
30 November 1917	Gazelle	United Kingdom	40	Sunk
30 November 1917	Lustre	United Kingdom	48	Damaged
3 December 1917	Copeland	United Kingdom	1,184	Sunk
6 December 1917	Saint Antoine De Padoue	France	355	Damaged

== Bibliography ==
- Gröner, Erich; Jung, Dieter; Maass, Martin (1991). German Warships 1815–1945, U-boats and Mine Warfare Vessels. Vol. 2. Translated by Thomas, Keith; Magowan, Rachel. London: Conway Maritime Press. ISBN 0-85177-593-4.
