= SM U-3 (Austria-Hungary) =

Austro-Hungarian Navy's U-3-class submarine

Coordinates: 41°00′N 18°15′E

- SM U-3 (front) and sister boat SM U-4 (right rear)

History

Austria-Hungary
- Name: SM U-3
- Ordered: 1906
- Builder: Friedrich Krupp Germaniawerft, Kiel
- Yard number: 135
- Laid down: 12 March 1907
- Launched: 20 August 1908
- Commissioned: 12 September 1909
- Fate: Sunk, 13 August 1915

Service record
- Commanders: Emmerich Graf von Thun und Hohenstein; 12 September 1909 – 18 September 1910; Lothar Leschanowsky; 18 September 1910 – 29 April 1911; Richard Gstettner; 29 April 1911 – 30 April 1912; Eduard Ritter von Hübner; 30 April 1912 – 19 June 1915; Karl Strnad; 19 June – 13 August 1915
- Victories: None

General characteristics
- Class & type: U-3-class submarine
- Displacement: 240 t surfaced; 300 t submerged
- Length: 138 ft 9 in (42.29 m)
- Beam: 14 ft (4.3 m)
- Draft: 12 ft 6 in (3.81 m)
- Propulsion: 2 × shafts; 2 × kerosene 4-cylinder two-stroke engines, 600 bhp (450 kW) total; 2 × electric motors, 320 shp (240 kW) total
- Speed: 12 knots (22 km/h) surfaced; 8.5 knots (15.7 km/h) submerged
- Range: 1,200 nmi (2,200 km) at 12 knots (22 km/h), surfaced; 40 nmi (74 km) at 3 knots (5.6 km/h), submerged
- Complement: 21
- Armament: 2 × 45 cm (17.7 in) torpedo tubes (both front); 3 torpedoes

SM U-3 or U-III was the lead boat of the U-3 class of submarines or U-boats built for and operated by the Austro-Hungarian Navy (German: Kaiserliche und Königliche Kriegsmarine or K.u.K. Kriegsmarine) before and during the First World War. The submarine was built as part of a plan to evaluate foreign submarine designs, and was built by Germaniawerft of Kiel, Germany.

U-3 was authorized in 1906, begun in March 1907, launched in August 1908, and towed from Kiel to Pola in January 1909. The double-hulled submarine was just under 139 feet (42 m) long and displaced between 240 and 300 tonnes (260 and 330 short tons), depending on whether surfaced or submerged. The design of the submarine had poor diving qualities and several modifications to U-3's diving planes and fins occurred in her first years in the Austro-Hungarian Navy. Her armament, as built, consisted of two bow torpedo tubes with a supply of three torpedoes, but was supplemented with a deck gun in 1915.

The boat was commissioned into the Austro-Hungarian Navy in September 1909, and served as a training boat—sometimes making as many as ten cruises a month—through the beginning of the First World War in 1914. At the start of that conflict, she was one of only four operational submarines in the Austro-Hungarian Navy U-boat fleet. Over the first year of the war, U-3 conducted reconnaissance cruises out of Cattaro. On 12 August 1915, U-3 was damaged after an unsuccessful torpedo attack on an Italian armed merchant cruiser and, after she surfaced the next day, was sunk by a French destroyer. U-3's commanding officer and 6 men died in the attack; the 14 survivors were captured.

== Design and construction ==
U-3 was built as part of a plan by the Austro-Hungarian Navy to competitively evaluate foreign submarine designs from Simon Lake, Germaniawerft, and John Philip Holland. The Austro-Hungarian Navy authorized the construction of U-3 (and sister ship, U-4) in 1906 by Germaniawerft of Kiel, Germany. U-3 was laid down on 12 March 1907 and launched on 20 August 1908. (Note: In their book The German Submarine War, 1914–1918, R. H. Gibson and Maurice Prendergast report that U-3 was launched in 1909 (p. 384).) After completion, she was towed via Gibraltar to Pola, where she arrived on 24 January 1909.

U-3's design was an improved version of Germaniawerft's design for the Imperial German Navy's first U-boat, U-1, and featured a double hull with internal saddle tanks. The Germaniawerft engineers refined the design's hull shape through extensive model trials.

U-3 was 138 feet 9 inches (42 m) long by 14 feet (4.3 m) abeam and had a draft of 12 feet 6 inches (3.81 m). She displaced 240 tonnes (260 short tons) surfaced and 300 tonnes (330 short tons) submerged. She was armed with two bow 45-centimeter (17.7 in) torpedo tubes, and was designed to carry up to three torpedoes.

== Service career ==
After U-3's arrival at Pola in January 1909, she was commissioned into the Austro-Hungarian Navy on 12 September 1909 as SM U-3. During the evaluation of the U-3 class conducted by the Navy, the class' poor diving and handling characteristics were noted. To alleviate the diving problems, U-3's fins were changed in size and shape several times, and eventually, the front diving planes were removed and a stationary stern flap was affixed to the hull. (Note: These same remedies were applied to U-3's sister ship U-4.) U-3 served as a training boat between 1910 and 1914 and made as many as ten cruises per month in that capacity.

At the beginning of World War I, she was one of only four operational submarines in the Austro-Hungarian Navy. On 22 August 1914, U-3 began operating reconnaissance cruises out of the naval base at Brioni, but moved a month later to Cattaro. In April 1915, a 3.7-centimeter (1.5 in) quick firing (QF) deck gun was added.

On 10 August, U-3 departed from Cattaro for what would be her final time for a patrol north of Brindisi. Two days later, while returning to Cattaro from the Straits of Otranto, U-3 launched a torpedo attack on the Italian armed merchant cruiser Citta di Catania. The torpedoes missed their mark and, in the ensuing action, U-3 was rammed by Citta di Catania, which destroyed the U-boat's periscope. When she attempted to surface, she was shelled by the escorting destroyers. She submerged to escape the artillery but was further damaged by a depth charge attack from the French destroyer Bisson while resting on the seabed. When U-3 surfaced the following day, she was shelled and sunk by Bisson. Fourteen of her crew were saved and captured, but seven died in the attack, including her commander, Linienschiffsleutnant Karel Strnad. (Note: Sister ship SM U-4 was dispatched on 15 August to search for the missing U-3. See: Sieche, p. 20.) U-3 had no successes during the war.

== Bibliography ==
- Baumgartner, Lothar; Erwin Sieche (1999). Die Schiffe der k.(u.)k. Kriegsmarine im Bild = Austro-Hungarian warships in photographs (in German). Wien: Verlagsbuchhandlung Stöhr. ISBN 978-3-901208-25-6. OCLC 43596931.
- Gardiner, Robert; Gray, Randal, eds. (1985). Conway's All the World's Fighting Ships 1906–1921. Annapolis, Maryland: Naval Institute Press. ISBN 978-0-87021-907-8. OCLC 12119866.
- Gibson, R. H.; Prendergast, Maurice (2003) [1931]. The German Submarine War, 1914–1918. Annapolis, Maryland: Naval Institute Press. ISBN 978-1-59114-314-7. OCLC 52924732.
- Halpern, Paul G. (1994). A Naval History of World War I. Annapolis, Maryland: Naval Institute Press. ISBN 978-0-87021-266-6. OCLC 28411665.
- Kemp, Paul (1997). U-boats destroyed: German submarine losses in the World Wars. Annapolis, Maryland: Naval Institute Press. ISBN 978-1-55750-859-1. OCLC 37460046.
- Sieche, Erwin F. (1980). "Austro-Hungarian Submarines". Warship, Volume 2. Naval Institute Press. ISBN 978-0-87021-976-4. OCLC 233144055.
- Marek, Jindřich (2001). Žraloci císaře pána (in Czech). Svět křídel. ISBN 80-85280-75-2.
