= Rudolf Singule =

Czehc-Austrian U-boat commander

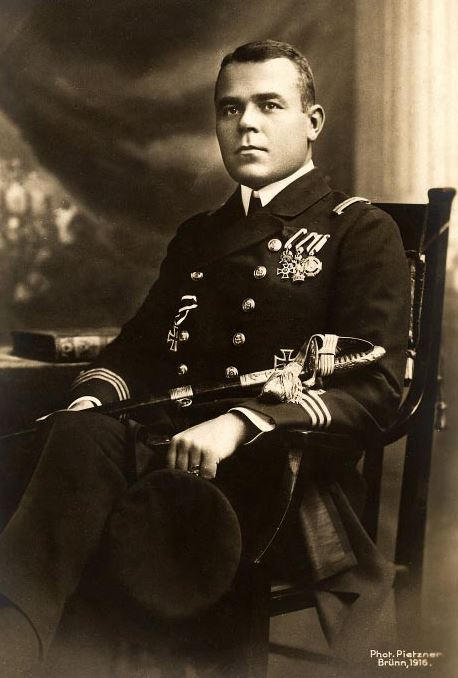
- Rudolf Singule in 1916
- Born: 8 April 1883; Pula, Austrian Littoral, Austria-Hungary
- Died: 2 May 1945 (aged 62); Brno, Protectorate of Bohemia and Moravia
- Resting place: Brno Central Cemetery
- Spouse: Dora Singlule (m. 1911; died 1940)
- Children: 3 daughters
- Military career
- Allegiance: Austria-Hungary
- Branch: Austro-Hungarian Navy; Kriegsmarine
- Service years: 1901–1918; 1941–1943
- Rank: Korvettenkapitän (lieutenant-commander)
- Commands: SM U-4 (21 September 1912 – 7 July 1913; 9 April 1915 – 30 November 1917); UD-4(1941–1943)
- Conflicts: Boxer Rebellion; World War I
- Awards: Knight's Cross of the Military Order of Maria Theresa (1929)

Rudolf Singule (8 April 1883 – 2 May 1945) was a Moravian-Austrian officer in the Austro-Hungarian Navy. He was one of the most successful Austro-Hungarian submarine commanders of World War I, sinking 11 Allied merchant ships and two Allied warships displacing 22,276 GRT. After the war he joined the Czechoslovak Army as a reservist and eventually served in Nazi Germany's Kriegsmarine submarine units during World War II.

== Early life ==
Rudolf Singule was born in Pula, Istria, then a Crown Land of Austria-Hungary (present-day Croatia) to a family of Rudolf Singule Sr., Austrian-Moravian entrepreneur originally from Brno (present-day Czech Republic) who worked there by this time as an adjunct at the maritime commissariat. His mother's name was Anna Wilhelmine Singule (née Stieber). Rudolf Jr. graduated from the Imperial and Royal Naval Academy in Fiume (present-day Rijeka).

== Naval career ==
Since 1901 he served as a Seekadett on the coast patrol ship SMS Budapest. After completing the officers' course, in 1900 he sailed on the cruiser SMS Aspern during the Boxer Rebellion to China. In 1909, he transferred to the newly established submarine base in Pula, where he became one of the first submarine officers of the Austro-Hungarian Navy. In 1911 he married Dora Schneider, who was of Jewish origin. Year later, in 1912, he became the commander of the submarine SM U-4.

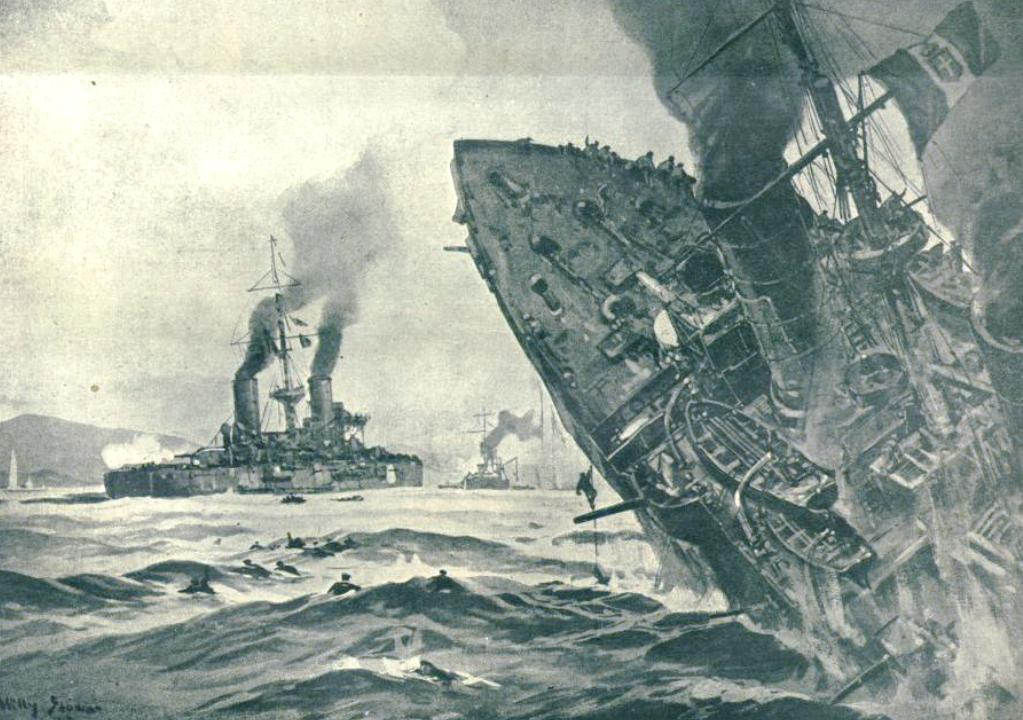
An Austro-Hungarian propaganda poster depicting the sinking of Giuseppe Garibaldi by SM U-4

After the outbreak of the First World War, he was stationed on his home base in Pula and subsequently served during the submarine Mediterranean and Adriatic campaign in the Austro-Hungarian submarine fleet. Under his command, U4 torpedoed and severely damaged the British Navy cruiser HMS Dublin in June 1915. On 18 July 1915, U-4 attacked and sank by torpedo fire the Italian armored cruiser Giuseppe Garibaldi, flagship of the Italian squadron in the Adriatic Sea, after the enemy shelling of the railroads at Dubrovnik coast. Thanks to this success Singule and his crew appeared in a daily press. In June 1917 Singule's crew torpedoed the French ship Berthilde. He served as a captain of U-4 until 30 January 1917. At the end of the war, his commander score counted one cruiser sunk and one disabled, as well as 14 destroyed and two damaged cargo ships, making him the third most successful submarine ace of the Austro-Hungarian Navy, after Georg von Trapp and Zdenko Hudeček. He is said to have always made sure, unlike a serious number of German U-boat captains, that the crews of merchant ships had time to board lifeboats and participated in rescuing castaways from sunken ships.

== Czechoslovakia and World War II ==
At the end of the war he returned to Brno to the newly established Czechoslovakia, accepted Czechoslovak citizenship and started working as a clerk in a pension insurance company while being registered as a reserve engineer troop officer. On December 21, 1929, he was awarded by the representatives of the Republic of Austria the Knight's Cross of the Military Order of Maria Theresa.

After the start of occupation of Czechoslovakia by Nazi Germany in March 1939 and creating a puppet state of Protectorate of Bohemia and Moravia, he renounced Czechoslovak citizenship and accepted a German one. This step was probably driven by fear for the lives of his Jewish wife and their three daughters. In 1940 his wife Dora died and Singule married again, this time to the German and Nazi Margharete von Brausewetter. At the age of 56, he was also recruited again: between 1940 and 1943 with the rank of corvette captain he commanded the training submarine UD-4 of the 5th training flotilla at Kiel. He was probably the only Czech-origin Kriegsmarine member. In 1943 he was retired and came back to Brno.

== Death ==
During the liberation of Czechoslovakia, on 2 May 1945, he allegedly stood up for a woman on the street near his home in Brno, who was being harassed by a few drunken Red Army soldiers. Soviets then fatally wounded him by the shot. According to the second version of the case, he was shot while protecting his house from looting.

Rudolf Singule was buried in an unmarked grave at the Brno Central Cemetery. In 1997, his grave was properly marked and in 2006 repaired at the expense of the local military history clubs.

=== Orders, decorations and medals ===
- Iron Cross 1st and 2nd Class (German Empire)
- Knight's Cross of the Imperial Order of Leopold
- Knight 2nd Class of the Order of the Iron Crown
- Military Merit Cross
- Military Merit Medal
- Knight's Cross of the Military Order of Maria Theresa (1929)
