= List of shipwrecks in September 1916 =

The list of shipwrecks in September 1916 includes ships sunk, foundered, grounded, or otherwise lost during September 1916.

== 1 September ==
List of shipwrecks: 1 September 1916
Ship	State	Description
Baron Yarborough	United Kingdom	World War I: The cargo ship was scuttled in the Mediterranean Sea 27 nautical miles (50 km) north west of Dragonera, Spain by SM U-34 (Imperial German Navy). Her crew survived.
Dronning Maud	Norway	World War I: The cargo ship struck a mine placed by SM UC-1 (Imperial German Navy) and sank in the North Sea 5 nautical miles (9.3 km) north east of Southwold, Suffolk, United Kingdom with the loss of three of her crew.
Giuseppe	Italy	World War I: The brigantine was sunk in the Mediterranean Sea 30 nautical miles (56 km) north of Ibiza, Spain (39°42′N 1°46′E) by SM U-34 (Imperial German Navy).
Hartford	United States	The steamer stranded in the Connecticut River near Essex, Connecticut.
S. Francesco Di Paola	Italy	World War I: The sailing vessel was sunk in the Mediterranean Sea east of Algiers, Algeria by SM U-38 (Imperial German Navy).
Swift Wings	United Kingdom	World War I: The collier was torpedoed and sunk in the Mediterranean Sea 18 nautical miles (33 km) east of Cape Bengut, Algeria by SM U-38 (Imperial German Navy) with the loss of two crew. Her captain was taken as a prisoner of war.
Wissman	United Kingdom	The cargo ship caught fire a Kilindini, Kenya and was scuttled.

== 2 September ==
List of shipwrecks: 2 September 1916
Ship	State	Description
Gioconda	Imperial Russian Navy	World War I: The transport ship was damaged in the Black Sea 45 nautical miles (83 km) off Trabzon, Turkey by SM UB-45 (Imperial German Navy). She was towed to Trabzon and beached for use as a landing stage. Not repaired post-war.
Kelvinia	United Kingdom	World War I: The cargo ship struck a mine in the Bristol Channel 9 nautical miles (17 km) south by west of Caldey Island, Pembrokeshire (51°33′31″N 4°42′45″W). Her crew survived.
Stormbird (1854)	New Zealand	wrecked on Castlecliff breakwater. 3 crew drowned. She was the oldest steamship still working.
Strathallan	United Kingdom	World War I: The cargo ship was shelled and sunk in the Mediterranean Sea 20 nautical miles (37 km) north east of Philippeville, Algeria (37°10′N 7°10′E) by SM U-38 (Imperial German Navy). Her crew survived, but her captain was taken as a prisoner of war.
Uranie	France	World War I: The sailing vessel was sunk in the Mediterranean Sea off Philippeville by SM U-38 (Imperial German Navy).

== 3 September ==
List of shipwrecks: 3 September 1916
Ship	State	Description
General Archinard	France	World War I: The barque was sunk in the English Channel 16 nautical miles (30 km) south east of the Royal Sovereign Lightship (United Kingdom) (50°35′N 0°50′E) by SM UB-23 (Imperial German Navy). Her crew survived.
Gotthard	Norway	World War I: The cargo ship was sunk in the English Channel 45 nautical miles (83 km) west south west of Beachy Head, Sussex, United Kingdom (50°17′N 0°13′W) by SM UB-29 (Imperial German Navy). Her crew survived.
Mascotte	United Kingdom	World War I: The cargo ship struck a mine and sank in the North Sea 6.5 nautical miles (12.0 km) off Southwold, Suffolk (52°15′N 1°50′E) with the loss of a crew member. by SM UC-6 (Imperial German Navy). Her crew survived.
Netta	United Kingdom	World War I: The coaster was scuttled in the English Channel 35 nautical miles (65 km) north east of Cap d'Antifer, Manche, France by SM UB-18 (Imperial German Navy). Her crew survived.
Notre Dame de Lourdes	France	World War I: The fishing vessel was sunk in the English Channel (50°26′N 0°01′W) by SM UB-29 (Imperial German Navy).
Peter Darcy	Imperial Russian Navy	World War I: The transport ship was sunk in the Black Sea north of Snake Island (45°28′N 30°18′E) by SM UB-42 (Imperial German Navy). Her crew survived.
Rievaulx Abbey	United Kingdom	World War I: The cargo liner struck a mine and sank in the Humber Estuary (53°30′40″N 0°17′30″E) with the loss of two lives.
Teesborough	United Kingdom	World War I: The coaster was scuttled in the English Channel 30 nautical miles (56 km) off Fécamp, Seine-Inférieure, France by SM UB-18 (Imperial German Navy). Her crew survived.
Villadoro	Italy	World War I: The sailing vessel was sunk in the Mediterranean Sea 60 nautical miles (110 km) off Zembra, Tunisia by SM U-38 (Imperial German Navy). Her crew survived.

== 4 September ==
List of shipwrecks: 4 September 1916
Ship	State	Description
Bydarky	United States	While anchored in Cook Inlet off Bluff Point Coal Mine on the south-central coast of the Territory of Alaska with a partial load of 90 tons of coal aboard, the 53-gross register ton coal barge dragged her anchors during a storm and was blown ashore and wrecked one nautical mile (1.9 km; 1.2 mi) away from her anchorage.
HMT Jessie Nutten	Royal Navy	World War I: The naval trawler struck a mine placed by SM UC-1 (Imperial German Navy) and sank in the North Sea off Lowestoft, Suffolk (52°17′N 1°46′E) with the loss of five of her crew.
Laristan	United Kingdom	World War I: The cargo ship was torpedoed and sunk in the Mediterranean Sea 30 nautical miles (56 km) south east of Gozo, Malta (36°04′N 13°13′E) by SM U-38 (Imperial German Navy). Her crew survived but her captain was taken as a prisoner of war.
Orfey	Imperial Russian Navy	The Orfey-class destroyer ran aground on the Westergund Bank, in the Baltic Sea. She was refloated the next day with the assistance of three tugs and taken in to Helsinki, Grand Duchy of Finland, where she was repaired.
Pasquale Lauro	Italy	World War I: The barque was scuttled in the Gulf of Lion (41°55′N 5°16′E) by SM U-34 (Imperial German Navy). Her crew took to the lifeboats but were not seen again.
Silverstream	Italy	World War I: The barque was scuttled in the Gulf of Lion (42°25′N 5°22′E) by SM U-34 (Imperial German Navy).
Stadion	Norway	The cargo ship capsized whilst being loaded at Hull, Yorkshire, United Kingdom of Great Britain and Ireland.
Zabiyaka	Imperial Russian Navy	The Orfey-class destroyer ran aground off "Talscher Island", in the Baltic Sea. She was refloated with assistance from the destroyer Orfey (Imperial Russian Navy) and the tugs Atlas and Black Sea No. 2 (both Russia). She was towed in to Helsinki, where she was repaired.

== 5 September ==
List of shipwrecks: 5 September 1916
Ship	State	Description
Blue Jacket	United States	The barge sank in a storm off Black Rock Harbor Light.
City of Ghent	United Kingdom	World War I: The coaster was scuttled in the English Channel 18 nautical miles (33 km) south east of Barfleur, Manche, France by SM UB-18 (Imperial German Navy). Her crew survived.
Jeanne	Denmark	World War I: The cargo ship was sunk in the English Channel 16 nautical miles (30 km) north east of the Casquets, Channel Islands (49°51′N 2°17′W) by SM UB-29 (Imperial German Navy). Her crew survived.
Marcel	Belgium	World War I: The cargo ship was torpedoed and sunk in the English Channel 20 nautical miles (37 km) north of Barfleur by SM UB-18 (Imperial German Navy).
Saint Marc	France	World War I: The cargo ship was sunk in the Mediterranean Sea 58 nautical miles (107 km) south east of Malta (35°08′N 15°23′E) by SM U-38 (Imperial German Navy). Her crew survived and were rescued by La Savoie (French Navy).
S. E. Vincent	United States	The barge sank in a storm off Black Rock Harbor Light. Later raised.
Spence	United Kingdom	The schooner was driven ashore 3 nautical miles (5.6 km) west of Point of Ayre, Isle of Man and was wrecked. Her three crew were rescued.

== 6 September ==
List of shipwrecks: 6 September 1916
Ship	State	Description
Britannia	United Kingdom	World War I: The ketch was scuttled in the English Channel 12 nautical miles (22 km) north of Alderney, Channel Islands by SM UB-23 (Imperial German Navy). Her crew survived.
HMT Manzanita	Royal Navy	The naval trawler was lost in the Mediterranean Sea on this date.
Rilda	Norway	World War I: The coaster was sunk in the North Sea east of the Noord Hinder Lightship (Netherlands) by SM UB-12 (Imperial German Navy). Her crew survived.
Strathtay	United Kingdom	World War I: The cargo ship was torpedoed and sunk in the English Channel 4 nautical miles (7.4 km) north of the Point de Pontsuval, Finistère, France (48°47′N 4°25′W) by SM UB-39 (Imperial German Navy). Her crew survived.
Tagus	United Kingdom	World War I: The coaster was scuttled in the English Channel 35 nautical miles (65 km) north east by east of Ouessant, Finistère (48°55′N 4°24′W) by SM UB-39 (Imperial German Navy). Her crew survived.
Torridge	United Kingdom	World War I: The cargo ship was scuttled in the English Channel 40 nautical miles (74 km) south south west of Start Point, Devon (49°33′N 3°39′W) by SM UB-29 (Imperial German Navy).
Yvonne	France	World War I: The sailing vessel was sunk in the English Channel (49°32′N 5°03′W) by SM UB-29 (Imperial German Navy).

== 7 September ==
List of shipwrecks: 7 September 1916
Ship	State	Description
Achaia	United Kingdom	World War I: The cargo ship struck a mine and sank in the Mediterranean Sea 300 yards (270 m) off Oran, Algeria (36°00′N 0°50′E). Her crew survived. The motor boats Allegro, Doreen and Griffin (all Royal Navy) were being carried as cargo and were also lost.
Alcyon	France	World War I: The schooner was set afire and sunk in the English Channel 30 nautical miles (56 km) north west of the Créac'h Lighthouse (48°50′N 5°20′W) by SM UB-39 (Imperial German Navy). Her crew survived; they were rescued by Hafursfjord (Norway).
Alice	France	World War I: The schooner was scuttled in the English Channel 30 nautical miles (56 km) north of Ouessant, Finistère by SM UB-29 (Imperial German Navy). Her crew survived; they were rescued by HMS Martin (Royal Navy).
Emma	France	World War I: The fishing vessel was scuttled in the English Channel 8 nautical miles (15 km) north of Sept-Îles, France by SM UB-23 (Imperial German Navy). Her crew survived.
Farfadet	France	World War I: The fishing vessel was sunk in the English Channel off the Triagoz Lighthouse, Finistère by SM UB-23 (Imperial German Navy). Her crew survived.
Heathdene	United Kingdom	World War I: The cargo ship was scuttled in the English Channel 38 nautical miles (70 km) south south west of The Lizard, Cornwall by SM UB-39 (Imperial German Navy). Her crew survived.
Hiso	Norway	World War I: The cargo ship struck a mine and sank in the Mediterranean Sea off Oran. Her crew survived.
Jeanne D'Arc	France	World War I: The fishing vessel was sunk in the English Channel off the Triagoz Lighthouse by SM UB-23 (Imperial German Navy). Her crew survived.
Leonine	France	World War I: The fishing vessel was scuttled in the English Channel off the Triagoz Lighthouse by SM UB-23 (Imperial German Navy). Her crew survived.
Luigia	United Kingdom	World War I: The barque was scuttled in the Gulf of Genoa (42°42′N 7°55′E) by SM U-34 (Imperial German Navy).
Marguerite	France	World War I: The sailing vessel was sunk in the Atlantic Ocean 50 nautical miles (93 km) north west of Ouessant (49°07′N 5°55′W) by SM UB-39 (Imperial German Navy). Her crew survived; they were rescued by Øifjeld (Norway).
Messicano	United Kingdom	World War I: The cargo ship was sunk in the Atlantic Ocean 50 nautical miles (93 km) south east of the Wolf Rock, Cornwall (48°57′N 5°48′W) by SM UB-39 (Imperial German Navy). Her crew survived.
Royal Prince	United Kingdom	The steamer went ashore on Lovells Island in the harbor at Boston, Massachusetts.

== 8 September ==
List of shipwrecks: 8 September 1916
Ship	State	Description
Butetown	United Kingdom	World War I: The collier was torpedoed and sunk in the Mediterranean Sea 55 nautical miles (102 km) west south west of Cape Matapan, Greece (36°00′N 21°15′E) by SM UB-47 (Imperial German Navy). Her crew survived.
Elizabeth IV	Norway	World War I: The cargo ship was sunk in the Mediterranean Sea west of Sardinia, Italy by SM U-34 (Imperial German Navy). Her crew survived.
Gamen	Sweden	World War I: The cargo ship, en route from Barry to Algiers, was sunk in the Atlantic Ocean 35 nautical miles (65 km) south west of the Bishop Rock, Isles of Scilly, United Kingdom by SM UB-18 (Imperial German Navy). Her crew survived.
Jeune Union	France	World War I: The schooner was sunk in the Atlantic Ocean 28 nautical miles (52 km) west by north of Ouessant, Finistère by SM UB-39 (Imperial German Navy).
Llangorse	United Kingdom	World War I: The cargo ship was torpedoed and sunk in the Mediterranean Sea 48 nautical miles (89 km) west south west of Cape Matapan (36°00′N 21°55′E) by SM UB-47 (Imperial German Navy). Her crew survived.
Lyderhorn	Norway	World War I: The cargo ship was sunk in the Atlantic Ocean 25 nautical miles (46 km) south east of Ouessant by SM UB-39 (Imperial German Navy). Her crew survived.
Marie Louise	France	World War I: The sailing vessel was set afire and sunk in the Atlantic Ocean 23 nautical miles (43 km) north by west of Ouessant (48°50′N 5°18′W) by SM UB-23 (Imperial German Navy). Her crew survived.
Mayo	Spain	World War I: The cargo ship was sunk in the Atlantic Ocean off Ouessant (48°53′N 5°28′W) by SM UB-23 (Imperial German Navy). Her crew survived.
Olazarri	Spain	World War I: The cargo ship was scuttled in the Atlantic Ocean 20 nautical miles (37 km) south west of Ouessant by SM UB-39 (Imperial German Navy).
Prince Georgios	Greece	The coaster caught fire at Malta. She was towed out of port but sank 4 nautical miles (7.4 km) offshire.
Spetzai	Greece	World War I: The cargo ship was sunk in the Mediterranean Sea 60 nautical miles (110 km) west of Cape Matapan (36°00′N 21°12′E) by SM UB-47 (Imperial German Navy). Her crew survived.

== 9 September ==
List of shipwrecks: 9 September 1916
Ship	State	Description
Consolation	United Kingdom	World War I: The fishing smack was scuttled in the English Channel 15 nautical miles (28 km) south south east of Start Point, Devon by SM UB-29 (Imperial German Navy). Her crew survived.
Dorado	United Kingdom	World War I: The fishing smack was scuttled in the English Channel 20 nautical miles (37 km) south south east of Start Point by SM UB-29 (Imperial German Navy). Her crew survived.
Europe	France	World War I: The three-masted schooner was scuttled in the English Channel 30 nautical miles (56 km) off the Île de Sein, Finistère (48°05′N 5°44′W) by SM UB-39 (Imperial German Navy). Her crew survived.
Favourite	United Kingdom	World War I: The fishing vessel was shelled and sunk in the English Channel 20 nautical miles (37 km) south east of Start Point by SM UB-29 (Imperial German Navy). Her crew survived.
Gemma	Italy	World War I: The cargo ship was sunk in the Atlantic Ocean 43 nautical miles (80 km) south west of the Wolf Rock, Cornwall, United Kingdom (49°16′N 6°10′W) by SM UB-23 (Imperial German Navy). Her crew survived.
Georges André	France	World War I: The schooner was sunk in the Atlantic Ocean 30 nautical miles (56 km) south west of the Bishop Rock, Isles of Scilly, United Kingdom (50°00′N 6°20′W) by SM UB-18 (Imperial German Navy). Her crew survived.
Lodsen	Norway	World War I: The cargo ship was sunk in the Atlantic Ocean 42 nautical miles (78 km) off the Longships Lighthouse (49°29′N 6°20′W) by SM UB-18 (Imperial German Navy). Her crew survived.
Muriel Franklin	United Kingdom	World War I: The fishing vessel was shelled and sunk in the English Channel 20 nautical miles (37 km) south east of Start Point by SM UB-29 (Imperial German Navy). Her crew survived.
Myosotis	France	World War I: The sailing vessel was sunk in the Atlantic Ocean 50°00′N 6°20′W) by SM UB-18 (Imperial German Navy). Her crew survived.
Pronto	Norway	World War I: The cargo ship was sunk in the Atlantic Ocean 13 nautical miles (24 km) north west of Ouessant by SM UB-39 (Imperial German Navy). Her crew survived.
Remora	France	World War I: The sailing vessel was sunk in the Atlantic Ocean south of the Wolf Rock by SM UB-23 (Imperial German Navy). Her crew survived, but were taken as prisoners of war.

== 10 September ==
List of shipwrecks: 10 September 1916
Ship	State	Description
Elli	Greece	World War I: The barque was sunk in the Mediterranean Sea south of Sardinia, Italy (38°18′N 9°14′E) by SM U-34 (Imperial German Navy).
Furu	Norway	World War I: The cargo ship was sunk in the Atlantic Ocean off the Bishop Rock, Isles of Scilly, United Kingdom by SM UB-18 (Imperial German Navy). Her crew survived.
Lexie	United Kingdom	World War I: The cargo ship was torpedoed and sunk in the Atlantic Ocean 42 nautical miles (78 km) south west of Ouessant, Finistère, France (47°51′N 5°50′W) by SM UB-39 (Imperial German Navy). Her crew survived.
Lindborg	Norway	World War I: The coaster was scuttled in the North Sea 9 nautical miles (17 km) north west of the Maas Lightship (Netherlands) by SM UB-6 (Imperial German Navy). Her crew survived.
Marechal de Villars	France	World War I: The barque was sunk in the Atlantic Ocean off the Isles of Scilly (49°06′N 6°15′W) by SM UB-18 (Imperial German Navy).
HMML 149	Royal Navy	The motor launch was lost in the Mediterranean Sea on this date.
Polynesia	Norway	World War I: The cargo ship was sunk in the Atlantic Ocean north west of Ouessant by SM UB-18 (Imperial German Navy). Her crew survived.
Spiridon	Greece	World War I: The barque was sunk in the Mediterranean Sea south of Sardinia (39°29′N 8°43′E) by SM U-34 (Imperial German Navy).

== 11 September ==
List of shipwrecks: 11 September 1916
Ship	State	Description
Assimacos	Greece	World War I: The cargo ship was scuttled in the Atlantic Ocean 45 nautical miles (83 km) south of the Seven Stones Reef (45°15′N 6°08′W) by SM UB-18 (Imperial German Navy).
Fredavore	Norway	World War I: The cargo ship was sunk in the Atlantic Ocean 28 nautical miles (52 km) north west of Ouessant, Finistère, France by SM UB-39 (Imperial German Navy). Her crew survived.
Kong Ring	Norway	World War I: The cargo liner was sunk in the Atlantic Ocean 30 nautical miles (56 km) south of the Isles of Scilly, United Kingdom (49°32′N 6°41′W) by SM UB-18 (Imperial German Navy). Her crew survived.
Lindborg	Norway	The cargo ship foundered in te North Sea. Her crew were rescued.
Luis Vives	Spain	World War I: The cargo ship was torpedoed and sunk in the Atlantic Ocean off the Isles of Scilly by SM UB-18 (Imperial German Navy).
Strazh	Imperial Russian Navy	The cruiser ran aground off Helsinki, Grand Duchy of Finland. She was abandoned as a total loss on 14 September.

== 12 September ==
List of shipwrecks: 12 September 1916
Ship	State	Description
Antwerpen	Netherlands	World War I: The tanker was sunk in the Atlantic Ocean 30 nautical miles (56 km) south west of the Isles of Scilly, United Kingdom (49°30′N 6°47′W) by SM UB-18 (Imperial German Navy).
Elizabeth	Imperial Russian Navy	World War I: The transport ship was sunk in the Baltic Sea off Grassgrund (59°20′N 23°46′E) by SM U-19 (Imperial German Navy).
Ije	Imperial Russian Navy	World War I: The transport ship was sunk in the Baltic Sea off Grassgrund by SM U-19 (Imperial German Navy). Her crew survived.
Panaghia Akathistou	Greece	World War I: The barque was sunk in the Mediterranean Sea south east of Sicily, Italy (36°19′N 16°16′E) by SM U-34 (Imperial German Navy).

== 13 September ==
List of shipwrecks: 13 September 1916
Ship	State	Description
Ariel	France	World War I: The sloop was scuttled in the English Channel 35 nautical miles (65 km) north west of Sept Îles, Côtes-du-Nord by SM UB-18 (Imperial German Navy). Her crew survived.
Hans Jensen	Denmark	World War I: The cargo ship was sunk in the English Channel 52 nautical miles (96 km) north east of the Île de Batz, Finistère, France (49°38′N 3°43′W) by SM UB-18 (Imperial German Navy). Her crew survived.
J. N. Madvig	Denmark	World War I: The cargo ship was sunk in the English Channel 54 nautical miles (100 km) north north west of Paimpol, Finistère (49°20′N 3°51′W) by SM UB-18 (Imperial German Navy). Her crew survived.
Tolosa	Norway	World War I: The cargo ship was sunk in the English Channel 30 nautical miles (56 km) north north east of the Île de Batz by SM UB-18 (Imperial German Navy). Her crew survived.

== 14 September ==
List of shipwrecks: 14 September 1916
Ship	State	Description
Congress	United States	The passenger ship caught fire in the Pacific Ocean 30 miles (48 km) off Coos Bay, Oregon. The ship made it to Coos Bay where all 424 passengers and her crew were rescued by the dredge Colonel P.S. Michie (United States Army) and Tillamock (United States) and other vessels. She was then beached and burned out.
Counsellor	United Kingdom	World War I: The cargo ship struck a mine and sank in the Atlantic Ocean 5 nautical miles (9.3 km) west of Galley Head, County Donegal (51°38′N 9°03′W). Her crew survived.
Ethel	Norway	World War I: The cargo ship was sunk in the English Channel off the Casquets, Channel Islands by SM UB-18 (Imperial German Navy). Her crew survived.
HMML 230	Royal Navy	World War I: The motor launch was shelled and sunk in the Mediterranean Sea 37°55′N 16°15′E by SM U-4 (Austro-Hungarian Navy).
HMML 253	Royal Navy	World War I: The motor launch was shelled and sunk in the Mediterranean Sea (37°55′N 16°15′E) by SM U-4 (Austro-Hungarian Navy).
HMML 255	Royal Navy	World War I: The motor launch was shelled and sunk in the Mediterranean Sea (37°55′N 16°15′E) by SM U-4 (Austro-Hungarian Navy).
Inverbervie	United Kingdom	World War I: The cargo ship was torpedoed and sunk in the Mediterranean Sea 17 nautical miles (31 km) south by west of Capo Rizzuto, Calabria, Italy (37°55′N 16°15′E) by SM U-4 (Austro-Hungarian Navy) with the loss of six of her crew.
Italiana	United Kingdom	World War I: The cargo ship was torpedoed and sunk in the Mediterranean Sea 112 nautical miles (207 km) east of Malta (36°00′N 16°50′E) by SM UB-43 (Imperial German Navy). Her crew survived.
Johan Tillberg	Sweden	World War I: The cargo ship, bound for Copenhagen, struck a mine in southern Øresund and sank. Nine casualties, three survivors
Kütahya	Ottoman Navy	World War I: The Antalya-class torpedo boat was sunk by mines in the Black Sea north of Karaburnu.
HMT Loch Garry	Royal Navy	The naval trawler/boom net tender broke loose from her moorings was driven aground and sunk in a gale at Kirkwall, Orkney Islands. Seven crew and her captain died, only the captain's son survived.

== 15 September ==
List of shipwrecks: 15 September 1916
Ship	State	Description
Barden	Sweden	The wooden schooner departed Mobile, Alabama, destined for Cardiff, Wales, and was not heard from again. No information is available on the cause of the disappearance. Nine casualties.
Foucault	French Navy	World War I: The Brumaire-class submarine was bombed and sunk in the Adriatic Sea 10 nautical miles (19 km) off Cattaro, Austria-Hungary by two Austro-Hungarian Navy seaplanes. Survivors were rescued by an Austro-Hungarian Navy torpedo boat.
Ida	Norway	The cargo ship collided with Anine (Denmark) at Porto, Portugal and was beached.

== 16 September ==
List of shipwrecks: 16 September 1916
Ship	State	Description
SMS Merkur	Imperial German Navy	The Vorpostenboot was lost on this date.

== 17 September ==
List of shipwrecks: 17 September 1916
Ship	State	Description
Dewa	United Kingdom	World War I: The cargo ship was torpedoed and sunk in the Mediterranean Sea 45 nautical miles (83 km) east by north of Malta by SM UB-43 (Imperial German Navy) with the loss of three of her crew.
La Canadienne	Canada	The hydrographic survey ship was wrecked near Doyton at the entrance to Black Bay in Lake Superior. Raised and taken to Port Arthur, Ontario for repairs.
Lord Tredegar	United Kingdom	World War I: The cargo ship was torpedoed and sunk in the Mediterranean Sea 51 nautical miles (94 km) south east by east of Malta (35°31′N 15°26′E) by SM UB-43 (Imperial German Navy) with the loss of four of her crew.

== 18 September ==
List of shipwrecks: 18 September 1916
Ship	State	Description
J. Holmes Hirdsall	United States	The schooner was driven ashore at San Juan, Puerto Rico and was a total loss.

== 19 September ==
List of shipwrecks: 19 September 1916
Ship	State	Description
Doride	Italy	World War I: The barque was shelled and sunk in the Mediterranean Sea 70 nautical miles (130 km) west of Isola Marittimo (38°24′N 10°45′E) by SM U-35 (Imperial German Navy). Her crew survived.
Janie	United Kingdom	The schooner was driven ashore on Salt Island, Anglesey and was wrecked.
Tangier	United States	The barge sprung a leak and sank in a gale in Chesapeake Bay 2 1/2 miles (4.0 km) south south east of York Spit Light off the York River.
Teresa C.	Italy	World War I: The schooner was sunk in the Mediterranean Sea off Cape Carbonara (38°35′N 9°50′E) by SM U-35 (Imperial German Navy).

== 20 September ==
List of shipwrecks: 20 September 1916
Ship	State	Description
Etton	United Kingdom	World War I: The collier struck a mine placed by SM U-75 (Imperial German Navy) and sank in the White Sea off Sviatoi Nos, Russia (67°36′N 41°20′E) with the loss of a crew member.

== 22 September ==
List of shipwrecks: 22 September 1916
Ship	State	Description
Exporter	United States	The tow steamer was sunk in 15 feet (4.6 m) of water when she struck a snag in the Ohio River near Ironton, Ohio.
Garibaldi	Italy	World War I: The barque was sunk in the Mediterranean Sea 60 nautical miles (110 km) west of Algiers, Algeria (37°45′N 2°50′E) by SM U-35 (Imperial German Navy).
Giovanni Zambelli	Italy	World War I: The cargo ship was sunk in the Mediterranean Sea (38°10′N 2°55′E) by SM U-35 (Imperial German Navy).
Kennett	United Kingdom	World War I: The cargo ship was torpedoed and sunk in the Gulf of Finland off Keri, Estonia by SM U-19 (Imperial German Navy) with the loss of a crew member.

== 23 September ==
List of shipwrecks: 23 September 1916
Ship	State	Description
Andromeda	United Kingdom	World War I: The trawler was shelled and sunk in the North Sea 39 nautical miles (72 km) south east by east of the Spurn Lightship (United Kingdom) by SM UC-16 (Imperial German Navy). Her crew survived.
Bay State	United States	The 2,262-gross register ton Eastern Steamship Company sidewheel paddle steamer was driven ashore in thick fog at Cape Elizabeth, Maine, just off McKinney's Point and could not be refloated. No loss of life. Her engines and other equipment were salvaged in 1917.
Beechwold	United Kingdom	World War I: The trawler was shelled and sunk in the North Sea 40 nautical miles (74 km) south east by east of the Spurn Lightship (United Kingdom) (53°12′N 1°10′E) by SM UC-16 (Imperial German Navy). Her crew survived.
Britannia III	United Kingdom	World War I: The trawler was shelled and sunk in the North Sea 40 nautical miles (74 km) south east by east of the Spurn Lightship (United Kingdom) by SM UC-16 (Imperial German Navy). Her crew survived.
Charterhouse	United Kingdom	World War I: The cargo ship was scuttled in the Mediterranean Sea 26 nautical miles (48 km) east by south of Formentera, Spain by SM U-35 (Imperial German Navy). Her crew survived, but three of them were taken as prisoners of war.
Cockatrice	United Kingdom	World War I: The trawler was shelled and sunk in the North Sea 40 nautical miles (74 km) south east by east of the Spurn Lightship (United Kingdom) by SM UC-16 (Imperial German Navy). Her crew survived.
Dresden	United Kingdom	World War I: The coaster was scuttled in the English Channel 41 nautical miles (76 km) south by east of the Nab Lightship (United Kingdom) by SM UB-37 (Imperial German Navy). Her crew survived.
Faith	United Kingdom	The schooner ran aground and sank at Milford Haven, Pembrokeshire.
Germaine	Belgium	World War I: The lighter was sunk in the North Sea off the Maas Lightship (Netherlands) by SM UB-6 (Imperial German Navy).
Lichtevreden II	Belgium	World War I: The vessel was sunk in the North Sea off the Maas Lightship (Netherlands) by SM UB-6 (Imperial German Navy). Her crew survived.
Maria da Jonge	Belgium	World War I: The barge was sunk in the North Sea off the Maas Lightship (Netherlands) by SM UB-6 (Imperial German Navy).
Marie	France	The sailing vessel collided with Wheatlands (United Kingdom) in the Irish Sea and sank. Her crew were rescued.
Mercury	United Kingdom	World War I: The trawler was shelled and sunk in the North Sea 65 nautical miles (120 km) south east by east of the Spurn Lightship (United Kingdom) by SM UC-16 (Imperial German Navy). Her crew survived.
Pearl	United Kingdom	World War I: The cargo ship was scuttled in the English Channel 41 nautical miles (76 km) south by east of the Nab Lightship (United Kingdom) by SM UB-37 (Imperial German Navy). Her crew survived.
Phoenix	United Kingdom	World War I: The trawler was shelled and sunk in the North Sea 45 nautical miles (83 km) east south east of the Spurn Lightship (United Kingdom) by SM UC-16 (Imperial German Navy). Her crew survived.
Refino	United Kingdom	World War I: The trawler was shelled and sunk in the North Sea 39 nautical miles (72 km) south east by east of the Spurn Lightship (United Kingdom) by SM UC-16 (Imperial German Navy). Her crew survived.
Rego	United Kingdom	World War I: The trawler was shelled and sunk in the North Sea 40 nautical miles (74 km) south east by east of the Spurn Lightship (United Kingdom) by SM UC-16 (Imperial German Navy). Her crew survived.
Restless	United Kingdom	World War I: The trawler was shelled and sunk in the North Sea 40 nautical miles (74 km) south east by east of the Spurn Lightship (United Kingdom) by SM UC-16 (Imperial German Navy). Her crew survived.
Rosalie	Belgium	World War I: The barge was sunk in the North Sea off the Maas Lightship (Netherlands) by SM UB-6 (Imperial German Navy).
Viella	United Kingdom	World War I: The trawler was scuttled in the North Sea 38 nautical miles (70 km) south east by east of the Spurn Lightship (United Kingdom) by SM UC-16 (Imperial German Navy). Her crew survived.
Weelsby	United Kingdom	World War I: The trawler was scuttled in the North Sea 40 nautical miles (74 km) south east by east of the Spurn Lightship (United Kingdom) by SM UC-16 (Imperial German Navy). Her crew survived.

== 24 September ==
List of shipwrecks: 24 September 1916
Ship	State	Description
Albatross	United Kingdom	World War I: The 100.1-foot (30.5 m), 158-ton steam trawler was captured, then shelled and sunk in the North Sea 20 nautical miles (37 km) east of Flamborough Head, Yorkshire by SM U-57 (Imperial German Navy). Her crew survived.
Aphelion	United Kingdom	World War I: The 109.9-foot (33.5 m), 197-ton steam trawler was captured, then shelled and sunk in the North Sea 20 nautical miles (37 km) east of Flamborough Head by SM U-57 (Imperial German Navy). Her crew survived.
Briton	United Kingdom	World War I: The 96.1-foot (29.3 m), 134-ton steam trawler was captured, then was shelled and sunk in the North Sea 18 nautical miles (33 km) south east by south of Flamborough Head by SM U-57 (Imperial German Navy). Her crew survived.
Bronwen	United Kingdom	World War I: The cargo ship was shelled and sunk 25 nautical miles (46 km) north by east of Dragonera, Spain (40°21′N 2°18′E) by SM U-35 (Imperial German Navy). Her crew survived, but three of them were taken as prisoners of war.
Bufjord	Norway	World War I: The cargo ship was sunk in the Mediterranean Sea 8 nautical miles (15 km) off Dragonera by SM U-35 (Imperial German Navy). Her crew survived.
Devonshire	United Kingdom	World War I: The 98.1-foot (29.9 m), 148-ton steam trawler was captured, and then was shelled and sunk in the North Sea 33 nautical miles (61 km) north east of the Spurn Lightship (United Kingdom) by SM U-57 (Imperial German Navy). Her crew survived.
Laila	Norway	World War I: The coaster was sunk in the North Sea 10 nautical miles (19 km) north east of Flamborough Head (54°38′N 0°26′E) by SM U-57 (Imperial German Navy). Her crew survived.
Marguerite	United Kingdom	World War I: The 103-foot (31 m), 151-ton steam trawler was captured, then shelled and sunk in the North Sea 20 nautical miles (37 km) north east of Scarborough, Yorkshire by SM U-57 (Imperial German Navy). Her crew survived.
Nicolo	Italy	World War I: The cargo ship was sunk in the Mediterranean Sea 19 nautical miles (35 km) north of Dragonera by SM U-35 (Imperial German Navy).
Oceanien	France	The fishing vessel was sunk in the North Sea 35 nautical miles (65 km) south of the Eddystone Lighthouse, Northumberland, United Kingdom (49°49′N 4°15′W) by SM UB-37 (Imperial German Navy).
Otter	United Kingdom	World War I: The 97-foot (30 m), 123-ton steam trawler was captured, then shelled and sunk in the North Sea 20 nautical miles (37 km) north east of Scarborough by SM U-57 (Imperial German Navy). Her crew survived.
Otterhound	United Kingdom	World War I: The 101-foot (31 m), 150-ton steam trawler was captured, then shelled and sunk in the North Sea 20 nautical miles (37 km) north east of Scarborough by SM U-57 (Imperial German Navy). Her crew survived.
Sunshine	United Kingdom	World War I: The 108.9-foot (33.2 m), 185-ton steam trawler was captured and then was shelled and sunk in the North Sea 20 nautical miles (37 km) north east of Scarborough by SM U-57 (Imperial German Navy). Her crew survived.
Tarantula	United Kingdom	World War I: The 101-foot (31 m), 155-ton steam trawler was captured and then scuttled by opening her scuppers in the North Sea 20 nautical miles (37 km) north east of Scarborough by SM U-57 (Imperial German Navy). Her crew survived.

== 25 September ==
List of shipwrecks: 25 September 1916
Ship	State	Description
Afrique	France	World War I: The cargo ship was sunk in the Atlantic Ocean 38 nautical miles (70 km) south of the Longships Lighthouse (49°27′N 5°35′W) by SM UB-37 (Imperial German Navy).
Bella	United Kingdom	World War I: The trawler was scuttled in the North Sea off the Tod Head Lighthouse, Aberdeenshire by SM U-64 (Imperial German Navy). Her four crew survived but were taken as prisoners of war.
Benpark	Italy	World War I The cargo ship was sunk in the Mediterranean Sea 40 nautical miles (74 km) south east of Barcelona, Spain by SM U-35 (Imperial German Navy). Her crew survived.
Cynthia	United Kingdom	World War I: The 97.1-foot (29.6 m), 133-ton steam trawler was captured, and then was shelled and sunk in the North Sea 23 nautical miles (43 km) east by south of Flamborough Head, Yorkshire by SM U-57 (Imperial German Navy). Her crew survived.
Fisher Prince	United Kingdom	World War I: The 98.1-foot (29.9 m), 125-ton steam trawler was captured, a prize crew was put aboard and she was used to hold the 125 crewmen of 15 (possibly 19) trawlers captured by SM U-57 (Imperial German Navy) on the night of 24-25, after dawn she transferred the prisoners to a Norwegian ship, and then was shelled and sunk in the North Sea 20 nautical miles (37 km) north east of Scarborough, Yorkshire. Her crew survived.
Game Cock	United Kingdom	World War I: The 104-foot (32 m), 151-ton steam trawler was captured, then was shelled and sunk in the North Sea 20 nautical miles (37 km) north east of Scarborough by SM U-57 (Imperial German Navy). Her crew survived.
Harrier	United Kingdom	World War I: The 105-foot (32 m), 162-ton steam trawler was captured, then shelled and sunk in the North Sea 20 nautical miles (37 km) north east of Scarborough by SM U-57 (Imperial German Navy). Her crew survived.
Loch Ness	United Kingdom	World War I: The 106-foot (32 m), 176-ton steam trawler was captured, and then was shelled and sunk in the North Sea 20 nautical miles (37 km) north east of Scarborough by SM U-57 (Imperial German Navy). Her crew survived.
Nil Desperandum	United Kingdom	World War I: The 101-foot (31 m), 148-ton steam trawler was captured, and then was scuttled with a bomb in the North Sea 20 nautical miles (37 km) north east of Scarborough by SM U-57 (Imperial German Navy). Her crew survived.
Quebec	United Kingdom	World War I: The 95.1-foot (29.0 m), 132-ton steam trawler was captured, and then was shelled and sunk in the North Sea 16 nautical miles (30 km) east by north of Whitby, Yorkshire by SM U-57 (Imperial German Navy). Her crew survived.
Seal	United Kingdom	World War I: The 101-foot (31 m), 135-ton steam trawler was captured, and then was shelled and sunk in the North Sea 33 nautical miles (61 km) east by south of Hartlepool, County Durham by SM U-57 (Imperial German Navy). Her crew survived.
St. Hilda	United Kingdom	World War I: The 98.4-foot (30.0 m), 94(?)-ton steam trawler was captured, and then was shelled and sunk in the North Sea 20 nautical miles (37 km) north east of Scarborough by SM U-57 (Imperial German Navy). Her crew survived.
Trinidad	United Kingdom	World War I: The 91.5-foot (27.9 m), 147-ton steam trawler was captured, and then was shelled and sunk in the North Sea 20 nautical miles (37 km) north east of Scarborough by SM U-57 (Imperial German Navy). Her crew survived.

== 26 September ==
List of shipwrecks: 26 September 1916
Ship	State	Description
American	France	The cargo ship caught fire and sank at Hong Kong.
Benguela	Sweden	World War I: The barque was scuttled in the North Sea 40 nautical miles (74 km) east of the Longstone Lighthouse, Northumberland, United Kingdom by SM U-49 (Imperial German Navy). Her crew survived.
HMY Conqueror II	Royal Navy	World War I: The 188-foot (57 m), 526-ton naval yacht was torpedoed and sunk in the Atlantic Ocean northwest of Fair Isle (59°44′N 1°35′W) by SM U-52 (Imperial German Navy) by the third torpedo of a salvo of three; the first one sank HMT Sarah Alice (Royal Navy). Seventeen crew were rescued the next day by HMS Sylvia (Royal Navy). Seventeen others were lost.
Dania	Norway	World War I: The coaster was sunk in the Barents Sea 7 nautical miles (13 km) north east of Cape Nordkinn, Finnmark by SM U-43 (Imperial German Navy). Her crew survived.
Enrico Millo	Italy	The cargo ship collided with Savoie (France) in the Mediterranean Sea and sank with some loss of life.
Knut Hilde	Norway	World War I: The cargo ship was sunk in the Barents Sea 5 nautical miles (9.3 km) off the Stetnes Lighthouse, Finnmark by SM U-43 (Imperial German Navy). Her crew survived.
HMT Loch Shiel	Royal Navy	World War I: The naval trawler struck a mine placed by SM U-78 (Imperial German Navy) and sank in the Irish Sea 7 nautical miles (13 km) west of the Helwick Lighthouse (51°29′N 4°45′W) with the loss of three of her crew
Newby	United Kingdom	World War I: The cargo ship was shelled and sunk in the Mediterranean Sea 53 nautical miles (98 km) east of Barcelona, Spain (41°30′N 3°20′E) by SM U-35 (Imperial German Navy). Her crew survived.
Reuben Dunbar	United States	The steamer was sunk when she struck a snag in the Ohio River just above Moscow, Ohio in heavy fog. Everyone on board was rescued by Cleo (United States).
Roddam	United Kingdom	World War I: The cargo ship was sunk in the Mediterranean Sea 76 nautical miles (141 km) east south east of Barcelona (40°53′N 3°18′E) by SM U-35 (Imperial German Navy). Her crew survived.
HMT Sarah Alice	Royal Navy	World War I: The 130.6-foot (39.8 m), 299-ton steam naval trawler was torpedoed and sunk in the Atlantic Ocean north west of Fair Isle (59°45′N 1°40′W) by SM U-52 (Imperial German Navy) by the first torpedo of a salvo of three. All sixteen crew were killed.
Stathe	United Kingdom	World War I: The cargo ship was shelled and sunk in the Mediterranean Sea 50 nautical miles (93 km) east by south of Barcelona (41°25′N 3°20′E) by SM U-35 (Imperial German Navy). Her crew survived.
St. Gothard	United Kingdom	World War I: The collier was sunk in the Atlantic Ocean 12 nautical miles (22 km) north by west of Fair Isle (59°41′N 1°45′W) by SM U-52 (Imperial German Navy). Her crew survived.
HMS Stirling Castle	Royal Navy	The auxiliary minesweeper was lost in the Mediterranean Sea on this date.
Thelma	United Kingdom	World War I: The cargo ship was torpedoed and sunk in the North Sea 24 nautical miles (44 km) east of Fair Isle by SM U-20 (Imperial German Navy). Her crew survived.

== 27 September ==
List of shipwrecks: 27 September 1916
Ship	State	Description
Avis	United Kingdom	The schooner was abandoned in the Atlantic Ocean 30 nautical miles (56 km) west of Miquelon.
Exchange	United Kingdom	The cargo ship struck the pier at the mouth of the River Bann. She consequently sank at her moorings in Coleraine, County Antrim.
Kachidate Maru	Japan	The cargo ship foundered in the South China Sea off Quelpart, Korea.
Minnie A. Emmons	United States	The dredge sank off New Haven, Connecticut.
Rallus	United Kingdom	World War I: The cargo ship was shelled and sunk in the Mediterranean Sea 45 nautical miles (83 km) north east by north of Dragonera, Spain by SM U-35 (Imperial German Navy). Her crew survived.
Secondo	United Kingdom	World War I: The cargo ship was torpedoed and sunk in the Mediterranean Sea 40 nautical miles (74 km) north north east of Dragonera by SM U-35 (Imperial German Navy). Her crew survived.
Thurso	United Kingdom	World War I: The cargo ship was sunk in the North Sea 60 nautical miles (110 km) north east by east of Rattray Head, Aberdeenshire by SM U-44 (Imperial German Navy). Her crew survived, but two were taken as prisoners of war.
SM UB-7	Imperial German Navy	World War I: The Type UB I submarine departed Varna, Bulgaria on patrol. Subsequently lost in the Black Sea with the loss of all fifteen crew.
Vindeggen	Norway	World War I: The cargo ship was sunk in the Mediterranean Sea 30 nautical miles (56 km) off Cape Frontera, Spain (40°18′N 3°10′E) by SM U-35 (Imperial German Navy). Her crew survived.

== 28 September ==
List of shipwrecks: 28 September 1916
Ship	State	Description
Emanuel	Norway	World War I: The sailing vessel was sunk south of the Firth of Forth (55°28′N 0°10′E) by SM U-49 (Imperial German Navy). Her crew survived.
Emma	Russia	World War I: The three-masted schooner was sunk in the Atlantic Ocean 75 nautical miles (139 km) west north west of Slyme Head, Shetland Islands, United Kingdom by SM UC-22 (Imperial German Navy).
Fuchsia	United Kingdom	World War I: The trawler was shelled and sunk in the North Sea (56°07′N 0°30′E) by SM U-45 (Imperial German Navy). Her nine crew were taken as prisoners of war.
Marjorie	United Kingdom	World War I: The fishing smack was scuttled in the North Sea off Norfolk by SM UB-12 (Imperial German Navy). Her crew survived.
HMT Orsino	Royal Navy	World War I: The naval trawler was shelled and sunk in the Atlantic Ocean north of Strathie Point, Sutherland (58°40′N 4°05′W) by SM U-55 (Imperial German Navy) with the loss of six crew.
Rolf Jarl	Norway	World War I: The cargo ship was sunk in the Barents Sea 10 nautical miles (19 km) off Alexandrosk, Russia by SM U-43 (Imperial German Navy). Her crew survived.

== 29 September ==
List of shipwrecks: 29 September 1916
Ship	State	Description
Knut Jarl	Norway	World War I: The cargo ship was sunk in the Barents Sea off Vardø, Finnmark (69°38′N 33°16′E) by SM U-43 (Imperial German Navy). Her crew survived.
Nesjar	Norway	World War I: The cargo ship was sunk in the Barents Sea 5 nautical miles (9.3 km) north west of Zyp-Navolok, Russia (69°38′N 33°16′E) by SM U-43 (Imperial German Navy). Her crew survived.
Nornen	Norway	World War I: The sailing vessel was sunk in the North Sea (56°15′N 3°34′E) by SM U-49 (Imperial German Navy). Her crew survived.
Ravn	Norway	World War I: The cargo ship was sunk in the Barents Sea 7 nautical miles (13 km) off Kildin Island, Russia by SM U-46 (Imperial German Navy) with the loss of ten crew.
Sinsen	Norway	World War I: The cargo ship was torpedoed and sunk in the Barents Sea 8 nautical miles (15 km) off the Lineberka Lightship (flag unknown) (69°05′N 34°50′E) by SM U-46 (Imperial German Navy). Her crew survived.
Venus	United Kingdom	World War I: The cargo ship was sunk in the Mediterranean Sea 20 nautical miles (37 km) off Cape San Antonio, Spain by SM U-35 (Imperial German Navy).
Viola	Sweden	The cargo ship was run into by another vessel and sank in the English Channel off St Helen's, Isle of Wight, United Kingdom.

== 30 September ==
List of shipwrecks: 30 September 1916
Ship	State	Description
Fancy	Norway	World War I: The cargo ship was sunk in the Barents Sea 6 nautical miles (11 km) south east of Shipnavalok, Russia by SM U-43 (Imperial German Navy). Her crew survived.
Hafnia	Norway	World War I: The coaster was scuttled in the Barents Sea 5 nautical miles (9.3 km) north of the Rybatchi Peninsula, Russia by SM U-46 (Imperial German Navy). Her crew survived.
Hekla	Norway	World War I: The coaster was sunk in the Barents Sea 30 nautical miles (56 km) off Kilberg, by SM U-46 (Imperial German Navy). Her crew survived.
Irma	France	World War I: The cargo ship was torpedoed and sunk in the Atlantic Ocean off Wolf Rock, Cornwall, United Kingdom (49°29′N 5°42′W) by SM UB-38 (Imperial German Navy).
Maywood	United Kingdom	World War I: The cargo ship struck a mine and sank in the English Channel off Le Havre, Seine-Inférieure, France. Her crew survived.
Pearl	United Kingdom	World War I: The schooner was scuttled in the English Channel 6 nautical miles (11 km) south south east of The Lizard, Cornwall (49°53′N 5°06′W) by SM UB-38 (Imperial German Navy). Her crew survived.
William George	United Kingdom	World War I: The schooner was shelled and sunk in the English Channel 10 nautical miles (19 km) north north east of Cap de la Hague, Manche, France by SM UC-26 (Imperial German Navy). Her crew survived.

== Unknown date ==
List of shipwrecks: Unknown date 1916
Ship	State	Description
Bertha	United States	The 9-gross register ton, 30.7-foot (9.4 m) fishing vessel sank in Klag Bay (57°38′N 136°06′W) in Southeast Alaska. The only person aboard survived.
Bremen	Germany	The merchant submarine departed Bremerhaven in September 1916 for Norfolk, Virginia, United States. No further trace, lost with all hands.
Gustave Vigeland	Norway	The cargo ship ran aground off the Longstone Lighthouse, Northumberland, United Kingdom. She later broke up and sank.
Norden	Russia	The barque was set afire and abandoned in the Atlantic Ocean sometime before 10 September.
Onward	United States	The 13 GRT, 42.6-foot (13.0 m) motor towing vessel sank at Sheep Creek, Territory of Alaska.
USS Stockton	United States Navy	The decommissioned torpedo boat was sunk as a target by battleships and destroyers of the United States Atlantic Fleet (United States Navy).
