= SM UB-122 =

German Imperial Navy U-boat

Coordinates: 50°11′53″N 1°10′09″W

- UB-148 at sea, a U-boat similar to UB-122.

History

German Empire
- Name: UB-122
- Ordered: 6 / 8 February 1917
- Builder: AG Weser, Bremen
- Cost: 3,654,000 German Papiermark
- Yard number: 295
- Laid down: 21 May 1917
- Launched: 2 February 1918
- Commissioned: 4 March 1918
- Fate: Surrendered 24 November 1918; scuttled English channel 1 July 1921

General characteristics
- Class & type: Type UB III submarine
- Displacement: 512 t (504 long tons) surfaced; 643 t (633 long tons) submerged
- Length: 55.85 m (183 ft 3 in) (o/a)
- Beam: 5.80 m (19 ft)
- Draught: 3.72 m (12 ft 2 in)
- Propulsion: 2 × propeller shaft; 2 × Körting four-stroke 6-cylinder diesel engines, 1,050 bhp (780 kW); 2 × Siemens-Schuckert electric motors, 780 shp (580 kW)
- Speed: 13.9 knots (25.7 km/h; 16.0 mph) surfaced; 7.6 knots (14.1 km/h; 8.7 mph) submerged
- Range: 7,280 nmi (13,480 km; 8,380 mi) at 6 knots (11 km/h; 6.9 mph) surfaced; 55 nmi (102 km; 63 mi) at 4 knots (7.4 km/h; 4.6 mph) submerged
- Test depth: 50 m (160 ft)
- Complement: 3 officers, 31 men
- Armament: 5 × 50 cm (19.7 in) torpedo tubes (4 bow, 1 stern); 10 torpedoes; 1 × 8.8 cm (3.46 in) deck gun

Service record
- Part of: III Flotilla; 7 July – 11 November 1918
- Commanders: Oblt.z.S. Alexander Magnus; 4 March – 11 November 1918
- Operations: 2 patrols
- Victories: None

SM UB-122 was a German Type UB III submarine or U-boat in the German Imperial Navy (German: Kaiserliche Marine) during World War I. She was commissioned into the German Imperial Navy on 4 March 1918 as SM UB-122. (Note: "SM" stands for "Seiner Majestät" (English: His Majesty's) and combined with the U for Unterseeboot would be translated as His Majesty's Submarine.)

UB-122 was surrendered to the Allies at Harwich on 20 November 1918 in accordance with the requirements of the Armistice with Germany. Having been exhibited at Southampton in December 1918, she was then laid up at Portsmouth until scuttled in the English Channel on 1 July 1921.

Although contemporary Admiralty documents leave no room for doubt as to UB-122's fate, her name has become widely associated with one of three submarine-wrecks in the Medway, which another Admiralty document makes clear can only be one of UB-144, UB-145 or UB-150.

== Construction ==
She was built by AG Weser of Bremen and following just under a year of construction, launched at Bremen on 4 March 1918. UB-122 was commissioned later the same year under the command of Oblt.z.S. Alexander Magnus. Like all Type UB III submarines, UB-122 carried 10 torpedoes and was armed with a 8.8 cm (3.46 in) deck gun. UB-122 would carry a crew of up to 3 officer and 31 men and had a cruising range of 7,280 nautical miles (13,480 km; 8,380 mi). UB-122 had a displacement of 512 t (504 long tons) while surfaced and 643 t (633 long tons) when submerged. Her engines enabled her to travel at 13.9 knots (25.7 km/h; 16.0 mph) when surfaced and 7.6 knots (14.1 km/h; 8.7 mph) when submerged.

== Bibliography ==
- Bendert, Harald (2000). Die UB-Boote der Kaiserlichen Marine, 1914-1918. Einsätze, Erfolge, Schicksal (in German). Hamburg: Verlag E.S. Mittler & Sohn GmbH. ISBN 3-8132-0713-7.
- Gröner, Erich; Jung, Dieter; Maass, Martin (1991). German Warships 1815–1945, U-boats and Mine Warfare Vessels. Vol. 2. Translated by Thomas, Keith; Magowan, Rachel. London: Conway Maritime Press. ISBN 0-85177-593-4.
- Rössler, Eberhard (1979). Die deutschen U-Boote und ihre Werften: eine Bilddokumentation über den deutschen U-Bootbau; in zwei Bänden (in German). Vol. I. Munich: Bernard & Graefe. ISBN 3-7637-5213-7.
