= German submarine U-143 =

U-143 may refer to one of the following German submarines:

- SM U-143, a Type U 142 submarine laid down during the First World War but unfinished at the end of the war; broken up incomplete 1919–20
  - During the First World War, Germany also had this submarine with a similar name:
    - SM UB-143, a Type UB III submarine launched in 1918 and surrendered on 1 December 1918; served as Japanese submarine O-7, 1920–21; broken up at Yokosuka Navy Yard by June 1921; used as a floating jetty at Yokosuka after February 1924
- German submarine U-143 (1940), a Type IID submarine that served in the Second World War; taken to Loch Ryan on 30 June 1945; sunk on 22 December 1945 as a part of Operation Deadlight
