= SM UB-60 =

Coordinates: 50°19′20″N 3°28′38″W

- UB-148 at sea, a U-boat similar to UB-60.

History

German Empire
- Name: UB-60
- Ordered: 20 May 1916
- Builder: AG Vulcan, Hamburg
- Cost: 3,279,000 German Papiermark
- Yard number: 85
- Launched: 14 April 1917
- Commissioned: 6 June 1917
- Fate: Surrendered 26 November 1918; foundered English Channel 12 July 1919

General characteristics
- Class & type: Type UB III submarine
- Displacement: 508 t (500 long tons) surfaced; 639 t (629 long tons) submerged
- Length: 55.52 m (182 ft 2 in) (o/a)
- Beam: 5.76 m (18 ft 11 in)
- Draught: 3.70 m (12 ft 2 in)
- Propulsion: 2 × propeller shaft; 2 × MAN four-stroke 6-cylinder diesel engines, 1,085 bhp (809 kW); 2 × Siemens-Schuckert electric motors, 780 shp (580 kW)
- Speed: 13.3 knots (24.6 km/h; 15.3 mph) surfaced; 7.8 knots (14.4 km/h; 9.0 mph) submerged
- Range: 8,420 nmi (15,590 km; 9,690 mi) at 6 knots (11 km/h; 6.9 mph) surfaced; 55 nmi (102 km; 63 mi) at 4 knots (7.4 km/h; 4.6 mph) submerged
- Test depth: 50 m (160 ft)
- Complement: 3 officers, 31 men
- Armament: 5 × 50 cm (19.7 in) torpedo tubes (4 bow, 1 stern); 10 torpedoes; 1 × 8.8 cm (3.46 in) deck gun

Service record
- Part of: Training Flotilla; 6 June 1917 – 11 November 1918
- Commanders: Oblt.z.S. Peter Ernst Eiffe; 6 June – 1 July 1917
- Operations: No patrols
- Victories: None

SM UB-60 was a German Type UB III submarine or U-boat in the German Imperial Navy (German: Kaiserliche Marine) during World War I. She was commissioned into the Training Flotilla of the German Imperial Navy on 6 June 1917 as SM UB-60. (Note: "SM" stands for "Seiner Majestät" (English: His Majesty's) and combined with the U for Unterseeboot would be translated as His Majesty's Submarine.)

She operated as part of the Training Flotilla based in Kiel. UB-60 was surrendered to the Allies at Harwich on 26 November 1918 in accordance with the requirements of the Armistice with Germany. She was sold by the British Admiralty to George Cohen on 3 March 1919 for £1,850, but foundered in tow en-route from Chatham to Swansea for breaking-up on 12 June 1919.

== Construction ==
She was built by AG Vulcan of Hamburg and following just under a year of construction, launched at Hamburg on 14 April 1917. UB-60 was commissioned later that same year under the command of Oblt.z.S. Peter Ernst Eiffe. Like all Type UB III submarines, UB-60 carried 10 torpedoes and was armed with a 8.8 cm (3.46 in) deck gun. UB-60 would carry a crew of up to 3 officer and 31 men and had a cruising range of 8,420 nautical miles (15,590 km; 9,690 mi). UB-60 had a displacement of 508 t (500 long tons) while surfaced and 639 t (629 long tons) when submerged. Her engines enabled her to travel at 13.3 knots (24.6 km/h; 15.3 mph) when surfaced and 8 knots (15 km/h; 9.2 mph) when submerged.

== Bibliography ==
- Bendert, Harald (2000). Die UB-Boote der Kaiserlichen Marine, 1914-1918. Einsätze, Erfolge, Schicksal (in German). Hamburg: Verlag E.S. Mittler & Sohn GmbH. ISBN 3-8132-0713-7.
- Gröner, Erich; Jung, Dieter; Maass, Martin (1991). U-boats and Mine Warfare Vessels. German Warships 1815–1945. Vol. 2. Translated by Thomas, Keith; Magowan, Rachel. London: Conway Maritime Press. ISBN 0-85177-593-4.
- Rössler, Eberhard (1979). Die deutschen U-Boote und ihre Werften: eine Bilddokumentation über den deutschen U-Bootbau; in zwei Bänden (in German). Vol. I. Munich: Bernard & Graefe. ISBN 3-7637-5213-7.
