= German submarine U-133 =

U-133 may refer to one of the following German submarines:

- SM U-133, a Type U 127 submarine laid down during the First World War but unfinished at the end of the war; broken up incomplete 1919–20
  - During the First World War, Germany also had this submarine with a similar name:
    - SM UB-133, a Type UB III submarine launched in 1918
- German submarine U-133 (1941), a Type VIIC submarine that served in the Second World War until sunk 14 March 1942
