= SM UB-79 =

- UB-148 at sea, a U-boat similar to UB-79.

History

German Empire
- Name: UB-79
- Ordered: 23 September 1916
- Builder: Blohm & Voss, Hamburg
- Cost: 3,338,000 German Papiermark
- Yard number: 308
- Launched: 3 June 1917
- Commissioned: 27 October 1917
- Fate: Surrendered 26 November 1918.

General characteristics
- Class & type: Type UB III submarine
- Displacement: 516 t (508 long tons) surfaced; 648 t (638 long tons) submerged
- Length: 55.30 m (181 ft 5 in) (o/a)
- Beam: 5.80 m (19 ft)
- Draught: 3.68 m (12 ft 1 in)
- Propulsion: 2 × propeller shaft; 2 × MAN four-stroke 6-cylinder diesel engines, 1,085 bhp (809 kW); 2 × Siemens-Schuckert electric motors, 780 shp (580 kW)
- Speed: 13.6 knots (25.2 km/h; 15.7 mph) surfaced; 7.8 knots (14.4 km/h; 9.0 mph) submerged
- Range: 8,680 nmi (16,080 km; 9,990 mi) at 8 knots (15 km/h; 9.2 mph) surfaced; 55 nmi (102 km; 63 mi) at 4 knots (7.4 km/h; 4.6 mph) submerged
- Test depth: 50 m (160 ft)
- Complement: 3 officers, 31 men
- Armament: 5 × 50 cm (19.7 in) torpedo tubes (4 bow, 1 stern); 10 torpedoes; 1 × 8.8 cm (3.46 in) deck gun

Service record
- Commanders: Kptlt. Woldemar Petri; 27 October – 30 November 1917
- Operations: No patrols
- Victories: None

SM UB-79 was a German Type UB III submarine or U-boat in the German Imperial Navy (German: Kaiserliche Marine) during World War I. She was commissioned into the German Imperial Navy on 27 October 1917 as SM UB-79. (Note: "SM" stands for "Seiner Majestät" (English: His Majesty's) and combined with the U for Unterseeboot would be translated as His Majesty's Submarine.)

UB-79 was surrendered in accordance with the requirements of the Armistice with Germany on 26 November 1918 and broken up at Swansea in 1922.

== Construction ==
She was built by Blohm & Voss of Hamburg and following just under a year of construction, launched at Hamburg on 3 June 1917. UB-79 was commissioned later that same year under the command of Kptlt. Woldemar Petri. Like all Type UB III submarines, UB-79 carried 10 torpedoes and was armed with a 8.8 cm (3.46 in) deck gun. UB-79 would carry a crew of up to 3 officer and 31 men and had a cruising range of 8,680 nautical miles (16,080 km; 9,990 mi). UB-79 had a displacement of 516 t (508 long tons) while surfaced and 648 t (638 long tons) when submerged. Her engines enabled her to travel at 13.6 knots (25.2 km/h; 15.7 mph) when surfaced and 7.8 knots (14.4 km/h; 9.0 mph) when submerged.

== Bibliography ==
- Bendert, Harald (2000). Die UB-Boote der Kaiserlichen Marine, 1914-1918. Einsätze, Erfolge, Schicksal (in German). Hamburg: Verlag E.S. Mittler & Sohn GmbH. ISBN 3-8132-0713-7.
- Gröner, Erich; Jung, Dieter; Maass, Martin (1991). U-boats and Mine Warfare Vessels. German Warships 1815–1945. Vol. 2. Translated by Thomas, Keith; Magowan, Rachel. London: Conway Maritime Press. ISBN 0-85177-593-4.
- Rössler, Eberhard (1979). Die deutschen U-Boote und ihre Werften: eine Bilddokumentation über den deutschen U-Bootbau; in zwei Bänden (in German). Vol. I. Munich: Bernard & Graefe. ISBN 3-7637-5213-7.
