= German submarine U-84 =

U-84 may refer to one of the following German submarines:

- SM U-84, a Type U 81 submarine launched in 1916 and that served in the First World War until sunk on 26 January 1918
  - During the First World War, Germany also had this submarine with a similar name:
    - SM UB-84, a Type UB III submarine launched in 1917 and surrendered on 26 November 1918; broken up at Brest in 1921
- German submarine U-84 (1941), a Type VIIB submarine that served in the Second World War until sunk on 7 August 1943
