= SM UB-71 =

German type UB III U-boat (submarine)

- UB-148 at sea, a U-boat similar to UB-71.

History

German Empire
- Name: UB-71
- Ordered: 20 May 1916
- Builder: Friedrich Krupp Germaniawerft, Kiel
- Cost: 3,276,000 German Papiermark
- Yard number: 289
- Launched: 12 July 1917
- Commissioned: 23 November 1917
- Fate: Sunk 21 April 1918

General characteristics
- Class & type: Type UB III submarine
- Displacement: 513 t (505 long tons) surfaced; 647 t (637 long tons) submerged
- Length: 55.83 m (183 ft 2 in) (o/a)
- Beam: 5.80 m (19 ft)
- Draught: 3.67 m (12 ft 0 in)
- Propulsion: 2 × propeller shaft; 2 × MAN four-stroke 6-cylinder diesel engines, 1,085 bhp (809 kW); 2 × Siemens-Schuckert electric motors, 780 shp (580 kW)
- Speed: 13.2 knots (24.4 km/h; 15.2 mph) surfaced; 7.6 knots (14.1 km/h; 8.7 mph) submerged
- Range: 9,090 nmi (16,830 km; 10,460 mi) at 6 knots (11 km/h; 6.9 mph) surfaced; 55 nmi (102 km; 63 mi) at 4 knots (7.4 km/h; 4.6 mph) submerged
- Test depth: 50 m (160 ft)
- Complement: 3 officers, 31 men
- Armament: 5 × 50 cm (19.7 in) torpedo tubes (4 bow, 1 stern); 10 torpedoes; 1 × 8.8 cm (3.46 in) deck gun

Service record
- Part of: I Flotilla; Unknown – 21 April 1918
- Commanders: Kptlt. Kurt Schapler; 23 November 1917 – 21 April 1918
- Operations: 1 patrol
- Victories: None

SM UB-71 was a German Type UB III submarine or U-boat in the German Imperial Navy (German: Kaiserliche Marine) during World War I. She was commissioned into the German Imperial Navy on 23 November 1917 as SM UB-71. (Note: "SM" stands for "Seiner Majestät" (English: His Majesty's) and combined with the U for Unterseeboot would be translated as His Majesty's Submarine.)

UB-71 was serving in the Mediterranean when she was sunk by depth charges at position 35°58′N 5°18′E from HMS ML413 off Menorca on 21 April 1918.

== Construction ==
She was built by Friedrich Krupp Germaniawerft of Kiel and following just under a year of construction, launched at Kiel on 12 July 1917. UB-71 was commissioned later that same year under the command of Kptlt. Kurt Schapler. Like all Type UB III submarines, UB-71 carried 10 torpedoes and was armed with a 8.8 cm (3.46 in) deck gun. UB-71 would carry a crew of up to 3 officer and 31 men and had a cruising range of 9,090 nautical miles (16,830 km; 10,460 mi). UB-71 had a displacement of 513 t (505 long tons) while surfaced and 647 t (637 long tons) when submerged. Her engines enabled her to travel at 13.2 knots (24.4 km/h; 15.2 mph) when surfaced and 7.6 knots (14.1 km/h; 8.7 mph) when submerged.

== Bibliography ==
- Bendert, Harald (2000). Die UB-Boote der Kaiserlichen Marine, 1914-1918. Einsätze, Erfolge, Schicksal (in German). Hamburg: Verlag E.S. Mittler & Sohn GmbH. ISBN 3-8132-0713-7.
- Gröner, Erich; Jung, Dieter; Maass, Martin (1991). U-boats and Mine Warfare Vessels. German Warships 1815–1945. Vol. 2. Translated by Thomas, Keith; Magowan, Rachel. London: Conway Maritime Press. ISBN 0-85177-593-4.
- Rössler, Eberhard (1979). Die deutschen U-Boote und ihre Werften: eine Bilddokumentation über den deutschen U-Bootbau; in zwei Bänden (in German). Vol. I. Munich: Bernard & Graefe. ISBN 3-7637-5213-7.
