= German submarine U-136 =

U-136 may refer to one of the following German submarines:

- SM U-136, a Type U 127 submarine launched in 1917 and that served in the First World War until surrendered on 23 February 1919; broken up at Cherbourg in 1921
  - During the First World War, Germany also had this submarine with a similar name:
    - SM UB-136, a Type UB III submarine launched in 1918
- German submarine U-136 (1941), a Type VIIC submarine that served in the Second World War until sunk by Léopard on 11 July 1942
