= German submarine U-154 =

U-154 may refer to one of the following German submarines:

- SM U-154, a Type U 151 submarine launched in 1917 and that served in World War I until sunk on 11 May 1918
  - During the First World War, Germany also had this submarine with a similar name:
    - SM UB-154, a Type UB III submarine laid down in 1917
- German submarine U-154 (1941), a Type IXC submarine that served in World War II until sunk on 3 July 1944
