= SM UB-143 =

- UB-148 at sea, a U-boat similar to UB-143.

History

German Empire
- Name: UB-143
- Ordered: 27 June 1917
- Builder: AG Weser, Bremen
- Cost: 4,301,000 German Papiermark
- Yard number: 309
- Laid down: 27 Oct 1917
- Launched: 21 August 1918
- Commissioned: 3 October 1918
- Fate: Surrendered to Japan 1 December 1918

Japan
- Name: O-7
- Commissioned: 1 December 1918
- Decommissioned: 1921
- Fate: Broken up in Yokohama in 1921

General characteristics
- Class & type: Type UB III submarine
- Displacement: 523 t (515 long tons) surfaced; 653 t (643 long tons) submerged
- Length: 55.85 m (183 ft 3 in) (o/a)
- Beam: 5.80 m (19 ft)
- Draught: 3.75 m (12 ft 4 in)
- Propulsion: 2 × propeller shaft; 2 × Benz four-stroke 6-cylinder diesel engines, 1,050 bhp (780 kW); 2 × Schiffsunion electric motors, 780 shp (580 kW)
- Speed: 13.5 knots (25.0 km/h; 15.5 mph) surfaced; 7.5 knots (13.9 km/h; 8.6 mph) submerged
- Range: 7,280 nmi (13,480 km; 8,380 mi) at 6 knots (11 km/h; 6.9 mph) surfaced; 55 nmi (102 km; 63 mi) at 4 knots (7.4 km/h; 4.6 mph) submerged
- Test depth: 50 m (160 ft)
- Complement: 3 officers, 31 men
- Armament: 5 × 50 cm (19.7 in) torpedo tubes (4 bow, 1 stern); 10 torpedoes; 1 × 10.5 cm (4.13 in) deck gun

Service record
- Commanders: Oblt.z.S. Hans Adalbert von der Lühe; 3 October – 11 November 1918
- Operations: No patrols
- Victories: None

SM UB-143 was a German Type UB III submarine or U-boat in the German Imperial Navy (German: Kaiserliche Marine) during World War I. She was commissioned into the German Imperial Navy on 3 October 1918 as SM UB-143. (Note: "SM" stands for "Seiner Majestät" (English: His Majesty's) and combined with the U for Unterseeboot would be translated as His Majesty's Submarine.)

She was surrendered to Japan on 1 December 1918 and served in the Imperial Japanese Navy as O-7 until 1921, when she was broken up in Yokohama.

== Construction ==
Built by AG Weser of Bremen in one year of construction, UB-143 was launched at Bremen on 21 August 1918, carried 10 torpedoes and was armed with a 10.5 cm (4.13 in) deck gun. UB-143 would carry a crew of up to 3 officer and 31 men and had a cruising range of 7,280 nautical miles (13,480 km; 8,380 mi). Displacement was 523 t (515 long tons) while surfaced and 653 t (643 long tons) when submerged. Her engines enabled her to travel at 13.5 knots (25.0 km/h; 15.5 mph) when surfaced and 7.5 knots (13.9 km/h; 8.6 mph) when submerged.

== Bibliography ==
- Bendert, Harald (2000). Die UB-Boote der Kaiserlichen Marine, 1914-1918. Einsätze, Erfolge, Schicksal (in German). Hamburg: Verlag E.S. Mittler & Sohn GmbH. ISBN 3-8132-0713-7.
- Gröner, Erich; Jung, Dieter; Maass, Martin (1991). U-boats and Mine Warfare Vessels. German Warships 1815–1945. Vol. 2. Translated by Thomas, Keith; Magowan, Rachel. London: Conway Maritime Press. ISBN 0-85177-593-4.
- Rössler, Eberhard (1979). Die deutschen U-Boote und ihre Werften: eine Bilddokumentation über den deutschen U-Bootbau; in zwei Bänden (in German). Vol. I. Munich: Bernard & Graefe. ISBN 3-7637-5213-7.
