= SM UB-154 =

- UB-148 at sea, a U-boat similar to UB-154.

History

German Empire
- Name: UB-154
- Ordered: 27 June 1917
- Builder: AG Vulcan, Hamburg
- Cost: 4,301,000 German Papiermark
- Yard number: 119
- Launched: 7 October 1918
- Completed: 14 December 1918
- Fate: Surrendered 9 March 1919, broken up

General characteristics
- Class & type: Type UB III submarine
- Displacement: 539 t (530 long tons) surfaced; 656 t (646 long tons) submerged
- Length: 55.52 m (182 ft 2 in) (o/a)
- Beam: 5.80 m (19 ft)
- Draught: 3.85 m (12 ft 8 in)
- Propulsion: 2 × propeller shaft; 2 × MAN-Vulcan four-stroke 6-cylinder diesel engines, 1,085 bhp (809 kW); 2 × Siemens-Schuckert electric motors, 780 shp (580 kW)
- Speed: 13.5 knots (25.0 km/h; 15.5 mph) surfaced; 7.5 knots (13.9 km/h; 8.6 mph) submerged
- Range: 7,120 nmi (13,190 km; 8,190 mi) at 6 knots (11 km/h; 6.9 mph) surfaced; 50 nmi (93 km; 58 mi) at 4 knots (7.4 km/h; 4.6 mph) submerged
- Test depth: 50 m (160 ft)
- Complement: 3 officers, 31 men
- Armament: 5 × 50 cm (19.7 in) torpedo tubes (4 bow, 1 stern); 10 torpedoes; 1 × 10.5 cm (4.13 in) deck gun

Service record
- Operations: No patrols
- Victories: None

SM UB-154' (Note: "SM" stands for "Seiner Majestät" (English: His Majesty's) and combined with the U for Unterseeboot would be translated as His Majesty's Submarine.) was a German Type UB III submarine or U-boat built for the German Imperial Navy (German: Kaiserliche Marine) during World War I. She was never commissioned into the German Imperial Navy but surrendered to France on 9 March 1919 in accordance with the requirements of the Armistice with Germany and broken up at Brest in July 1921.

== Construction ==
SM UB-154 was built by AG Vulcan of Hamburg and following just under a year of construction, launched at Hamburg on 7 October 1918. UB-154 carried 10 torpedoes and was armed with an 10.5 cm (4.13 in) deck gun. UB-154 would carry a crew of up to three officers and 31 men and had a cruising range of 7,120 nautical miles (13,190 km; 8,190 mi). UB-154 had a displacement of 539 t (530 long tons) while surfaced and 656 t (646 long tons) when submerged. Her engines enabled her to travel at 13.5 knots (25.0 km/h; 15.5 mph) when surfaced and 7.5 knots (13.9 km/h; 8.6 mph) when submerged.

== Bibliography ==
- Bendert, Harald (2000). Die UB-Boote der Kaiserlichen Marine, 1914-1918. Einsätze, Erfolge, Schicksal (in German). Hamburg: Verlag E.S. Mittler & Sohn GmbH. ISBN 3-8132-0713-7.
- Gröner, Erich; Jung, Dieter; Maass, Martin (1991). U-boats and Mine Warfare Vessels. German Warships 1815–1945. Vol. 2. Translated by Thomas, Keith; Magowan, Rachel. London: Conway Maritime Press. ISBN 0-85177-593-4.
- Rössler, Eberhard (1979). Die deutschen U-Boote und ihre Werften: eine Bilddokumentation über den deutschen U-Bootbau; in zwei Bänden (in German). Vol. I. Munich: Bernard & Graefe. ISBN 3-7637-5213-7.
