= Innes McCartney =

British nautical archaeologist

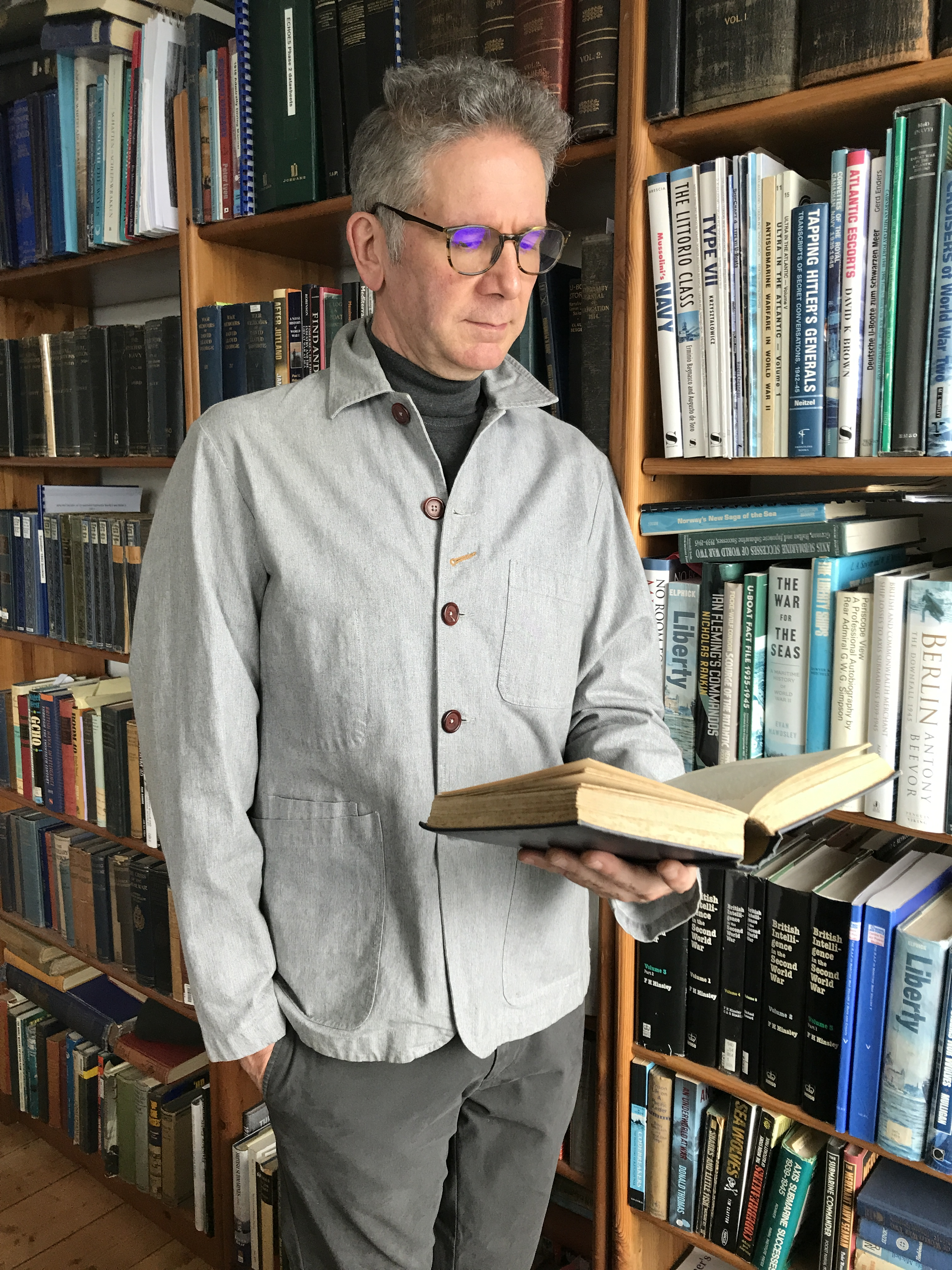
- Born: 24 March 1964 (age 62)
- Education: Keele University; Exeter University; Bournemouth University
- Occupations: Nautical archaeologist, historian

Innes McCartney (born 1964) is a British nautical archaeologist and historian. He is a Visiting Fellow at Bournemouth University in the UK.

== Career ==
McCartney is a nautical archaeologist specializing in the interaction of shipwreck archaeology with the historical record.

In 1999, he discovered the 12-inch-gunned submarine HMS M1 off Start Point in the English Channel.

In 2001, he discovered the wreck of HMS Indefatigable, sunk at the Battle of Jutland. In the same year he led expeditions to identify some of the U-boats sunk during Operation Deadlight. Fourteen U-boats were surveyed and several new sites discovered.

In 2003 he identified the mystery World War I U-boat off Trevose Head, Cornwall, as UB-65 by scraping the propellers to reveal the shipyard stamp. This proved that even at a depth of 60 metres (200 ft), war graves of this type can be identified by divers without the need to scavenge parts from them. This featured in the Channel 4 series Wreck Detectives.

In 2006 he featured in the documentary U-boat Death-Trap which followed his search for the identity of three mystery U-boats off the north coast of Cornwall. In the same year he discovered the German auxiliary raider HSK Komet in the English Channel. At the time, it was the only known example of this type of warship anywhere in the world.

In 2008 he found the White Star Line transport SS Armenian off the Scilly Isles.

In 2012 McCartney worked alongside wreck hunter David Mearns on an archaeological investigation of the wreck of HMS Hood (51), sunk in 1941. This project was supported by philanthropist Paul Allen aboard his yacht Octopus. The expedition findings were featured in the Channel Four documentary, How the Bismarck sank HMS Hood.

2015 saw publication of The Maritime Archaeology of a Modern Conflict: comparing the archaeology of German submarine wrecks to the historical text. It shows the extent to which historical sources relating U-boat losses in UK waters in both world wars differ from the actual distribution of the known and identified wrecks. Over 40% of those investigated had no historical precedent. The accuracy of the historic text fell as low as 36% during 1945.

In 2015 and 2016 McCartney worked as archaeological advisor to the Sea War Museum Jutland on detailed archaeological shipwreck surveys to locate all of the heretofore undiscovered wrecks of the Battle of Jutland. This was published in Jutland 1916: The Archaeology of a Naval Battlefield, for which he was awarded the 2016 Anderson Medal by the Society for Nautical Research.

The British submarine HMS Tarpon (N17) was also located during the North Sea surveys in 2016.

In 2016, McCartney helped Scottish Power identify a World War I UB-III Class U-boat off the Wigtownshire coast which was found during the seabed survey for an undersea power cable between England and Scotland. McCartney has suggested the wreck is UB-82, or possibly UB-85, which were both sunk after attacks by British patrol boats in April 1918.

In 2017 he assisted the Sea War Museum Jutland in a detailed survey of the Scapa Flow naval anchorages. The results were published in May 2019 in SCAPA 1919: The Archaeology of a Scuttled Fleet.

In May 2020 it was announced that the wreck of the landing craft LCT 326 had been found off Bardsey Island during surveys by Bangor University, in collaboration with McCartney. The wreck is located over 100 nautical miles (190 km; 120 mi) from its supposed loss position. In September 2021 as part of the same project, it was announced that the minesweeper HMS Mercury had been found in the Irish Sea. It sank in 1940 during sweeping operations.

In September 2022 it was announced that the wreck of the liner SS Mesaba had been identified by McCartney in the Irish Sea during surveys by Bangor University. The ship is famous for having radioed an ice warning, picked up by RMS Titanic which later struck an iceberg and sank with high loss of life in the North Atlantic Ocean. SS Mesaba was sunk by German submarine UB-118 on 1 September 1918. SS Mesaba, LCT 326 and HMS Mercury are examples of the 273 shipwrecks surveyed by Bangor University and assessed by McCartney in a Leverhulme Trust-funded research project, published as a single-authored monograph, Echoes from the Deep. The project led to the naming of 87% of the wrecks surveyed.

== Honours ==
- The Anderson Medal of the Society for Nautical Research (UK, 2016) awarded for McCartney, Innes (19 May 2016). Jutland 1916: The Archaeology of a Naval Battlefield. Bloomsbury. ISBN 9781844864171.
- D.K. Brown Memorial Lecture of the World Ship Society (UK, 2016)
- Reg Vallintine Achievement Award of the Historical Diving Society (UK, 2014) awarded for "The "Tin Openers" Myth and Reality".

== Selected bibliography ==
- Innes McCartney (2022). ECHOES FROM THE DEEP: Inventorising shipwrecks at the national scale by the application of marine geophysics and the historical text. Sidestone. ISBN 978-9464261165.
- McCartney, Innes (2020). "The Archaeology of Second World War U-boat Losses in the English Channel and its Impact on the Historical Record". Mariner's Mirror. 106 (1): 62–81. doi:10.1080/00253359.2020.1692578.
- Innes McCartney (2019). SCAPA 1919: The Archaeology of a Scuttled Fleet. Osprey. ISBN 978-1472828903.
- McCartney, Innes (2019). "The Archaeology of First World War U-boat Losses in the English Channel and its Impact on the Historical Record". Mariner's Mirror. 105 (2): 183–201. doi:10.1080/00253359.2019.1589114.
- McCartney, Innes (2018). "Scuttled in the Morning: the discoveries and surveys of HMS Warrior and HMS Sparrowhawk, the Battle of Jutland's last missing shipwrecks". The International Journal of Nautical Archaeology. 47 (2): 253–266. Bibcode:2018IJNAr..47..253M. doi:10.1111/1095-9270.12302.
- McCartney, Innes (2018). "Paying the Prize for the German Submarine War: U-boats destroyed and the Admiralty Prize Fund, 1919–1932" (PDF). Mariner's Mirror. 104: 40–57. doi:10.1080/00253359.2018.1411100. S2CID 165637258.
- McCartney, Innes (2017). "The Opening and Closing Sequences of the Battle of Jutland 1916 Re-examined: archaeological investigations of the wrecks of HMS Indefatigable and SMS V4" (PDF). The International Journal of Nautical Archaeology. 46 (2): 317–329. Bibcode:2017IJNAr..46..317M. doi:10.1111/1095-9270.12236. S2CID 164686388.
- McCartney, Innes (2017). "The Battle of Jutland's Heritage under Threat: The extent of commercial salvage on the shipwrecks as observed 2000-2016" (PDF). Mariner's Mirror. doi:10.1080/00253359.2017.1304701. S2CID 165003480.
- Innes McCartney (2016). Jutland 1916: The Archaeology of a Naval Battlefield. Bloomsbury. ISBN 978-1844864164.
- McCartney, Innes (2015). "The "Tin Openers" Myth and Reality: Intelligence from U-boat Wrecks During WW1". Proceedings of the 24th Annual Conference of the Historical Diving Society.
- Innes McCartney (2015). The Maritime Archaeology of a Modern Conflict: comparing the archaeology of German submarine wrecks to the historical text. Routledge. Bibcode:2017IJNAr..46..212G. doi:10.1111/1095-9270.12219. ISBN 978-1138814356. S2CID 233374599.
