= SM UB-136 =

- UB-148 at sea, a U-boat similar to UB-136.

History

German Empire
- Name: UB-136
- Ordered: 27 June 1917
- Builder: Friedrich Krupp Germaniawerft, Kiel
- Cost: 3,485,000 German Papiermark
- Yard number: 313
- Launched: 27 September 1918
- Completed: 16 April 1919
- Fate: Surrendered, broken up in Rochester in 1922

General characteristics
- Class & type: Type UB III submarine
- Displacement: 533 t (525 long tons) surfaced; 656 t (646 long tons) submerged
- Length: 55.83 m (183 ft 2 in) (o/a)
- Beam: 5.80 m (19 ft)
- Draught: 3.77 m (12 ft 4 in)
- Propulsion: 2 × propeller shaft; 2 × MAN four-stroke 6-cylinder diesel engines, 1,085 bhp (809 kW); 2 × Siemens-Schuckert electric motors, 780 shp (580 kW)
- Speed: 13.5 knots (25.0 km/h; 15.5 mph) surfaced; 7.5 knots (13.9 km/h; 8.6 mph) submerged
- Range: 9,090 nmi (16,830 km; 10,460 mi) at 6 knots (11 km/h; 6.9 mph) surfaced; 55 nmi (102 km; 63 mi) at 4 knots (7.4 km/h; 4.6 mph) submerged
- Test depth: 50 m (160 ft)
- Complement: 3 officers, 31 men
- Armament: 5 × 50 cm (19.7 in) torpedo tubes (4 bow, 1 stern); 10 torpedoes; 1 × 10.5 cm (4.13 in) deck gun

Service record
- Operations: No patrols
- Victories: None

SM UB-136 (Note: "SM" stands for "Seiner Majestät" (English: His Majesty's) and combined with the U for Unterseeboot would be translated as His Majesty's Submarine.) was a German Type UB III submarine or U-boat built for the German Imperial Navy (German: Kaiserliche Marine) during World War I. Completed after the end of hostilities, she was not commissioned into the German Imperial Navy but surrendered to Britain in accordance with the requirements of the Armistice with Germany. In 1922 she was broken up in Rochester.

== Construction ==
She was built by Friedrich Krupp Germaniawerft of Kiel and following just under a year of construction, launched at Kiel on 27 September 1918. UB-136 carried 10 torpedoes and was armed with a 10.5 cm (4.13 in) deck gun. UB-136 would carry a crew of up to 3 officer and 31 men and had a cruising range of 9,090 nautical miles (16,830 km; 10,460 mi). UB-136 had a displacement of 533 t (525 long tons) while surfaced and 656 t (646 long tons) when submerged. Her engines enabled her to travel at 13.5 knots (25.0 km/h; 15.5 mph) when surfaced and 7.5 knots (13.9 km/h; 8.6 mph) when submerged.

== Bibliography ==
- Bendert, Harald (2000). Die UB-Boote der Kaiserlichen Marine, 1914-1918. Einsätze, Erfolge, Schicksal (in German). Hamburg: Verlag E.S. Mittler & Sohn GmbH. ISBN 3-8132-0713-7.
- Gröner, Erich; Jung, Dieter; Maass, Martin (1991). U-boats and Mine Warfare Vessels. German Warships 1815–1945. Vol. 2. Translated by Thomas, Keith; Magowan, Rachel. London: Conway Maritime Press. ISBN 0-85177-593-4.
- Rössler, Eberhard (1979). Die deutschen U-Boote und ihre Werften: eine Bilddokumentation über den deutschen U-Bootbau; in zwei Bänden (in German). Vol. I. Munich: Bernard & Graefe. ISBN 3-7637-5213-7.
