= SM UB-145 =

Coordinates: 51.430663°N 0.63201°E

- UB-148 at sea, a U-boat similar to UB-145.

History

German Empire
- Name: UB-145
- Ordered: 27 June 1917
- Builder: AG Weser, Bremen
- Cost: 4,301,000 German Papiermark
- Yard number: 311
- Laid down: 15 April 1918
- Launched: October 1918
- Completed: 27 March 1919
- Fate: Surrendered 27 March 1919; sold for scrap 22 July 1920; hulk dumped in Medway estuary 1922

General characteristics
- Class & type: Type UB III submarine
- Displacement: 523 t (515 long tons) surfaced; 653 t (643 long tons) submerged
- Length: 55.85 m (183 ft 3 in) (o/a)
- Beam: 5.80 m (19 ft)
- Draught: 3.85 m (12 ft 8 in)
- Propulsion: 2 × propeller shaft; 2 × Benz four-stroke 6-cylinder diesel engines, 1,050 bhp (780 kW); 2 × Schiffsunion electric motors, 780 shp (580 kW)
- Speed: 13.5 knots (25.0 km/h; 15.5 mph) surfaced; 7.5 knots (13.9 km/h; 8.6 mph) submerged
- Range: 7,280 nmi (13,480 km; 8,380 mi) at 6 knots (11 km/h; 6.9 mph) surfaced; 55 nmi (102 km; 63 mi) at 4 knots (7.4 km/h; 4.6 mph) submerged
- Test depth: 50 m (160 ft)
- Complement: 3 officers, 31 men
- Armament: 5 × 50 cm (19.7 in) torpedo tubes (4 bow, 1 stern); 10 torpedoes; 1 × 10.5 cm (4.13 in) deck gun

Service record
- Operations: No patrols
- Victories: None

UB-145 was a German Type UB III submarine or U-boat built for the German Imperial Navy (German: Kaiserliche Marine) during World War I. Incomplete at the end of the war, she was surrendered to the Allies at Harwich on 27 March 1919, and then taken to Chatham Dockyard as a potential subject for experimental work, but was never so-employed. She was sold to M. Lynch & Sons on 22 July 1920 for £2,000, and towed to Rochester, Kent. After being stripped of any reusable material, the hulk was dumped in shallow water in the Medway estuary, along with those of UB-144 and UB-150. The remains of all three - partly broken up in-situ during 1939–45, with one significantly better preserved than the other two - remain visible, but it is unclear which wreck is which.

== Construction ==
She was built by AG Weser of Bremen and following just under a year of construction, launched at Kiel in October 1918. UB-145 carried 10 torpedoes and was armed with a 10.5 cm (4.13 in) deck gun. UB-145 would have carried a crew of up to 3 officer and 31 men and had a cruising range of 7,280 nautical miles (13,480 km; 8,380 mi). UB-145 had a displacement of 523 t (515 long tons) while surfaced and 653 t (643 long tons) when submerged. Her engines would have enabled her to travel at 13.5 knots (25.0 km/h; 15.5 mph) when surfaced and 7.5 knots (13.9 km/h; 8.6 mph) when submerged.

== Bibliography ==
- Bendert, Harald (2000). Die UB-Boote der Kaiserlichen Marine, 1914-1918. Einsätze, Erfolge, Schicksal (in German). Hamburg: Verlag E.S. Mittler & Sohn GmbH. ISBN 3-8132-0713-7.
- Gröner, Erich; Jung, Dieter; Maass, Martin (1991). U-boats and Mine Warfare Vessels. German Warships 1815–1945. Vol. 2. Translated by Thomas, Keith; Magowan, Rachel. London: Conway Maritime Press. ISBN 0-85177-593-4.
- Rössler, Eberhard (1979). Die deutschen U-Boote und ihre Werften: eine Bilddokumentation über den deutschen U-Bootbau; in zwei Bänden (in German). Vol. I. Munich: Bernard & Graefe. ISBN 3-7637-5213-7.
