= Type UB III submarine =

Class of U-boat

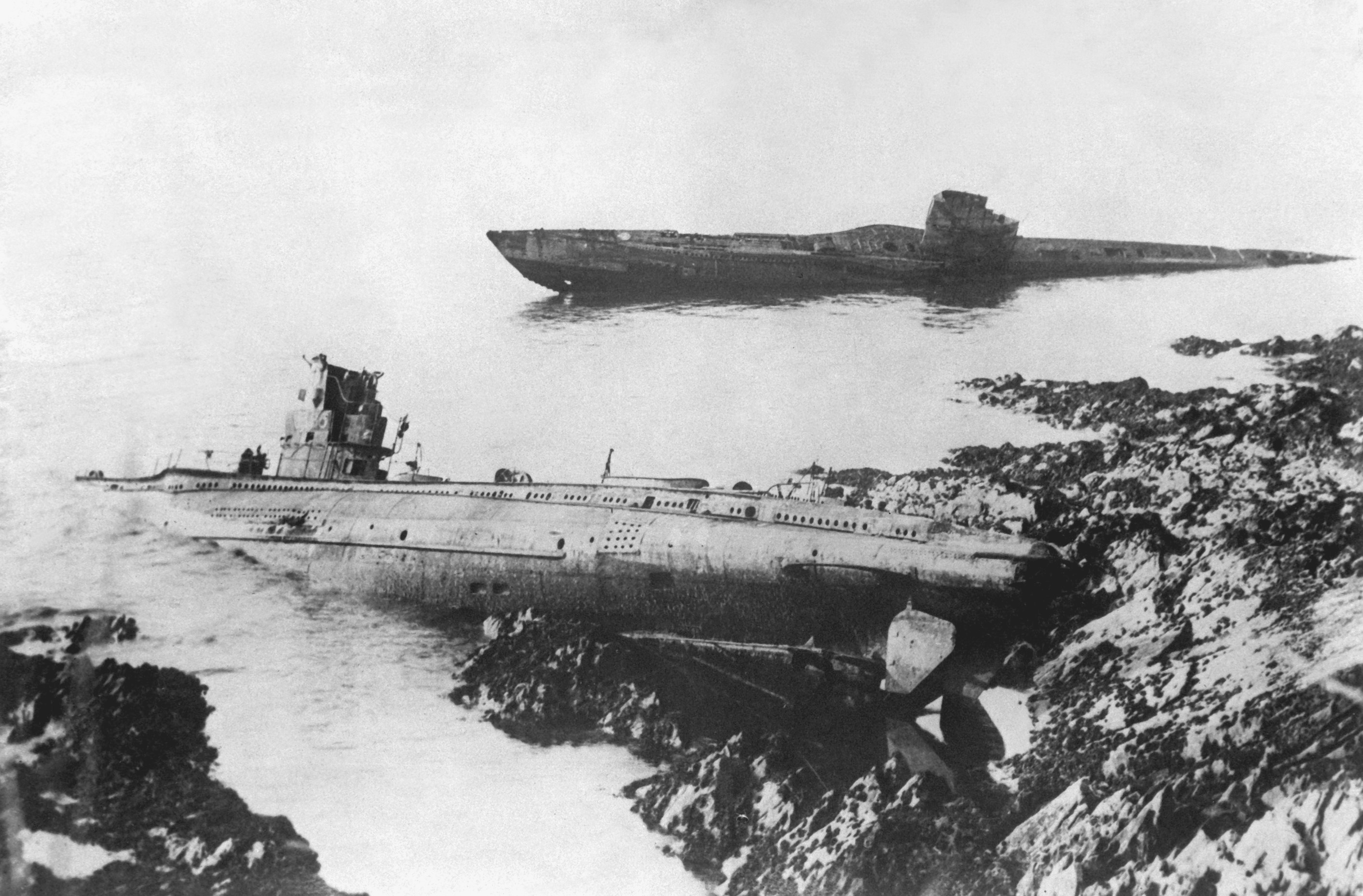
- UB-86 washed ashore, 1921

Class overview
- Builders: AG Weser, Bremen; Blohm & Voss, Hamburg; AG Vulcan, Hamburg; Germaniawerft, Kiel
- Operators: Imperial German Navy; Imperial Japanese Navy; French Navy
- Preceded by: UB II
- Built: 1916–1918
- In commission: 1917–1935
- Planned: 201
- Building: 145
- Completed: 96
- Canceled: 56
- Lost: 37

General characteristics
- Type: Coastal submarine
- Displacement: 508–555 t (500–546 long tons) surfaced; 629–684 t (619–673 long tons) submerged
- Length: 55.30–57.80 m (181 ft 5 in – 189 ft 8 in) (o/a); 40.10 m (131 ft 7 in) (pressure hull)
- Beam: 5.76–5.80 m (18 ft 11 in – 19 ft 0 in)
- Draught: 3.67–3.85 m (12 ft 0 in – 12 ft 8 in)
- Installed power: 6-cylinder diesel engines, 1,060–1,100 PS (780–809 kW; 1,045–1,085 shp); electric motors, 788 PS (580 kW; 777 shp)
- Propulsion: 2 shafts, 2 1.40 m (4 ft 7 in) propellers
- Speed: 13.2–13.9 knots (24.4–25.7 km/h; 15.2–16.0 mph) surfaced; 7.4–8 knots (13.7–14.8 km/h; 8.5–9.2 mph) submerged
- Range: 7,120–9,090 nmi (13,190–16,830 km; 8,190–10,460 mi) at 6 knots (11 km/h; 6.9 mph) surfaced; 50–55 nmi (93–102 km; 58–63 mi) at 4 knots (7.4 km/h; 4.6 mph) submerged
- Test depth: 50 m (160 ft)
- Complement: 3 officers, 31 men
- Armament: 4 × 50 cm (19.7 in) bow torpedo tubes; 1 × stern tube; 10 torpedoes; 1 × 8.8 cm (3.5 in) SK L/30; or 10.5 cm (4.1 in) SK L/45 deck gun

The Type UB III submarine was a class of a U-boat built during World War I by the German Imperial Navy.

== Design ==
When it became clear that unrestricted submarine warfare would be resumed in 1916, the German Navy sought a way to speed up submarine construction. Since large fleet submarines took more than a year to build, and since the actual coastal Type UB II submarine being built at that time was too small, a design was derived from the successful, small minelaying Type UC II submarine for a medium-sized U-boat capable of reaching the Mediterranean or operating around the British Isles. The forward section of the Type UC II with the mine shaft compartment was replaced with a torpedo compartment containing four torpedo tubes and three spare torpedoes whilst the aft compartment with one stern torpedo tube and two reloads was retained. More powerful diesel engines were installed to increase the surface speed and the range was increased by enlarging the saddle tanks. In order to compensate partially the extra weight of the engines and armament, fewer battery cells were installed which reduced submerged speed and range. The conning tower was enlarged so that a second periscope could be installed. The conning tower was now also separated from the control room with a pressure-tight bulkhead.

UB III boats carried 10 torpedoes and were usually armed with either an 8.8 cm (3.5 in) or a 10.5 cm (4.1 in) deck gun. They carried a crew of 34 and had a cruising range of 7,120–9,090 nautical miles (13,190–16,830 km; 8,190–10,460 mi). Between 1916 and 1918, 96 were built.

On 2 May 1916 a total of twenty-four Type UB III were ordered from four yards: UB-48 – UB-53 from Blohm & Voss, UB-48 – UB-53 from AG Weser, UB-48 – UB-53 from AG Vulcan and UB-48 – UB-53 from Germaniawerft.

== Service history ==
The UB IIIs joined the conflict mid-1917, after the United States declared war on Germany and the United States Navy was added to the ranks of their enemies. When the convoy system was introduced, it became more difficult to engage enemy merchant shipping without being spotted by destroyer escorts. Nevertheless, the UB IIIs performed their duties with distinction, sinking 521 ships with a total of 1,123,211 gross register tons (GRT) and 7 warships, including the battleship HMS Britannia, before the end of hostilities.

More than 200 UB III boats were ordered where of these, 96 were completed, and 89 commissioned into the German Imperial Navy. Thirty-seven boats were lost, and four of them in accidents. Surviving boats had to be surrendered to the Allies in accordance with the requirements of the Armistice with Germany, some of these boats served until 1935.

== Legacy ==
In 1917, Swedish officials were impressed by the design's performance. As a result, Kockums bought a license for the design, shortened the hull and removed a rear torpedo tube, and built three submarines for the Swedish Navy. The three submarines, the Hajen-class, was slightly modified to build three Bävern-class submarines, still reminiscent of the Type UB III.

Germany was prohibited from acquiring a new submarine force by the Treaty of Versailles, but German admirals had no intention of allowing their nation to forget how to construct submarines. Germany started to manufacture and export slightly modified versions of UB IIs and UB IIIs through the Dutch front company NV Ingenieurskantoor voor Scheepsbouw (IvS). Having kept the skills of their engineers polished by this means, they eventually ordered the construction of a new coastal submarine. The resulting design was an improved UB-III that had the benefit of new, all-welded construction techniques and an array of electronic and electromechanical gadgets: the Type VII submarine, the most common U-boat of the Kriegsmarine, was born. During the interwar era, IvS continued to modernize the design, which resulted in the two Birinci İnönü-class boats sold to Turkey.

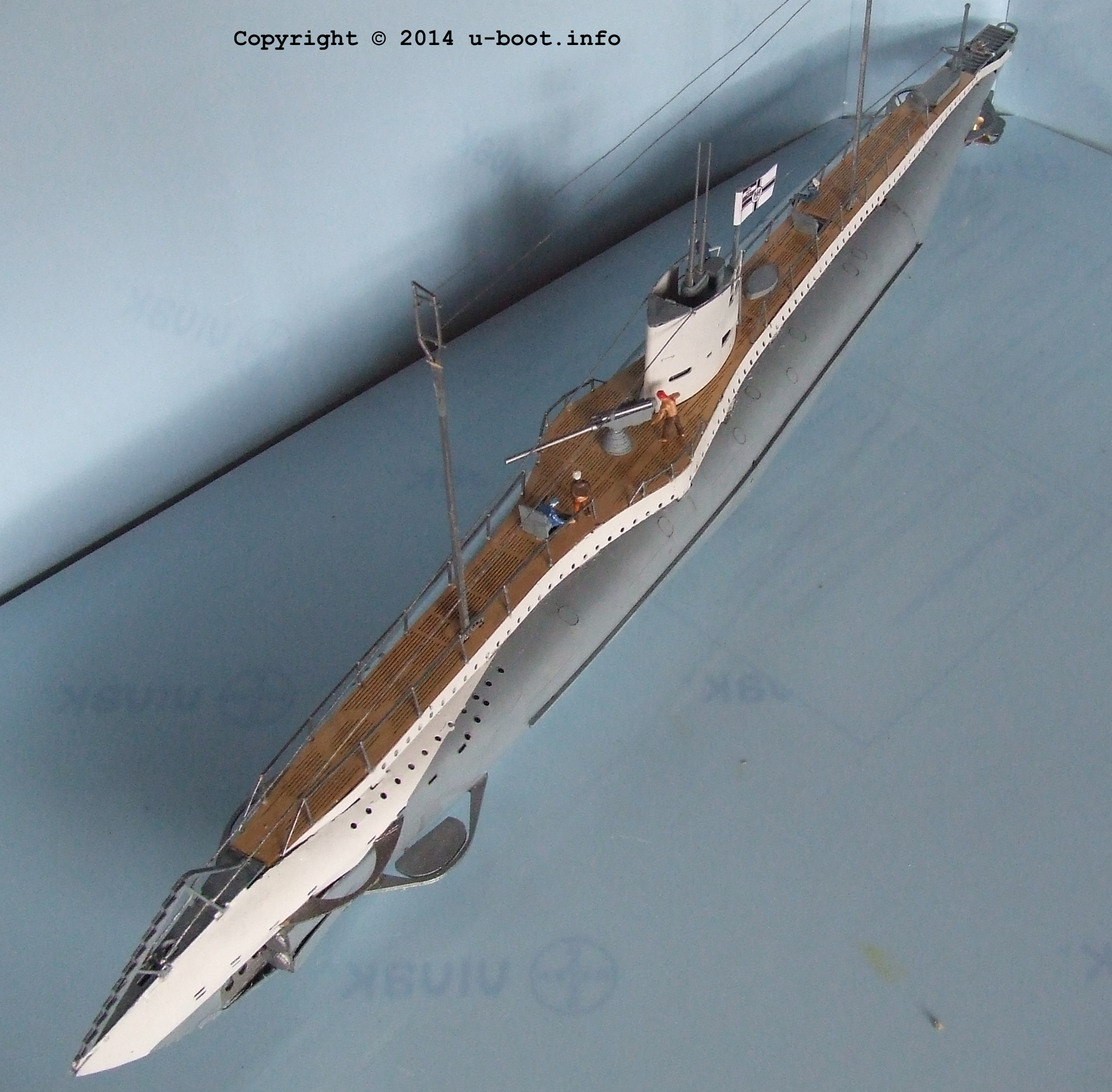

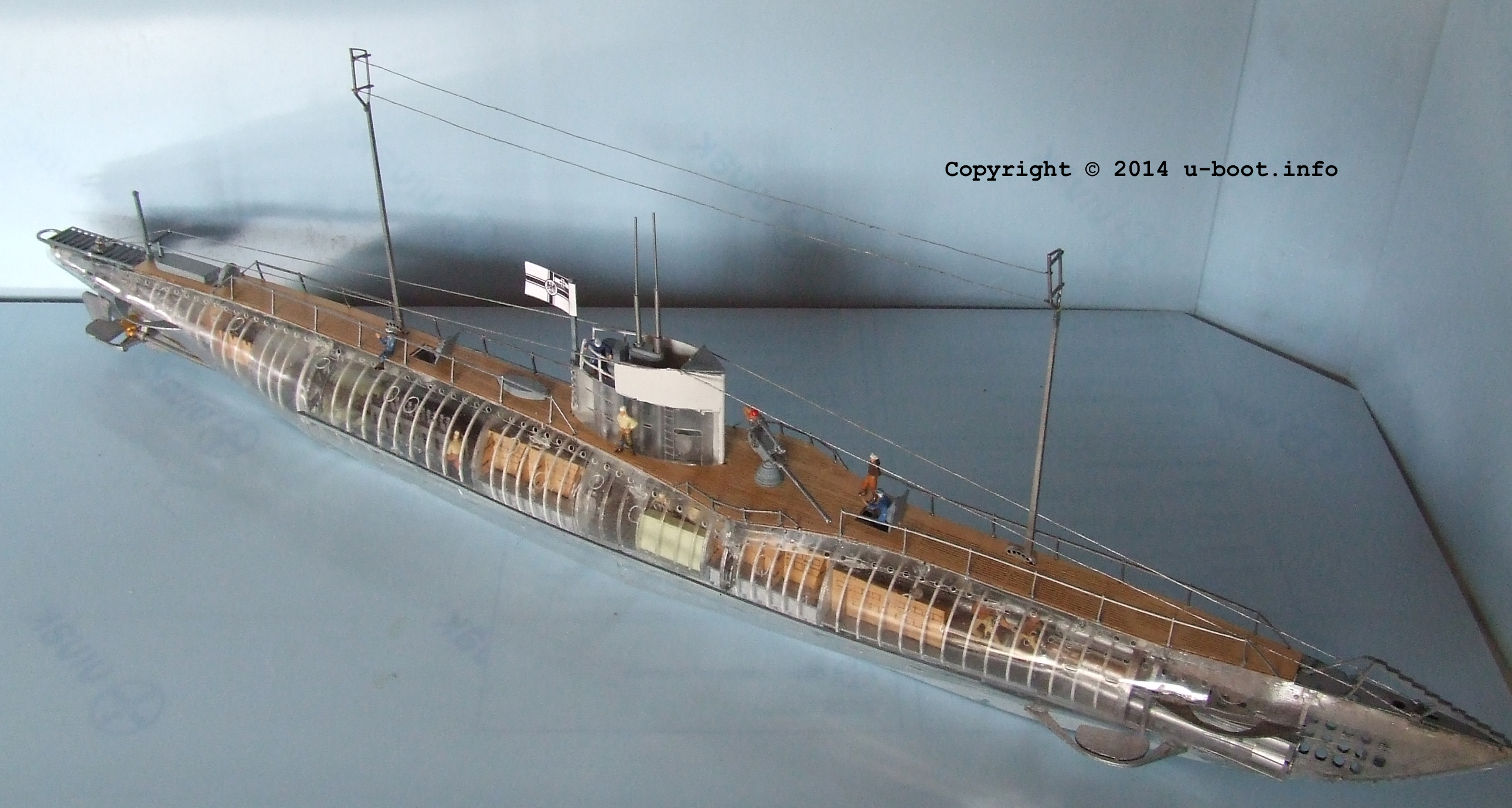

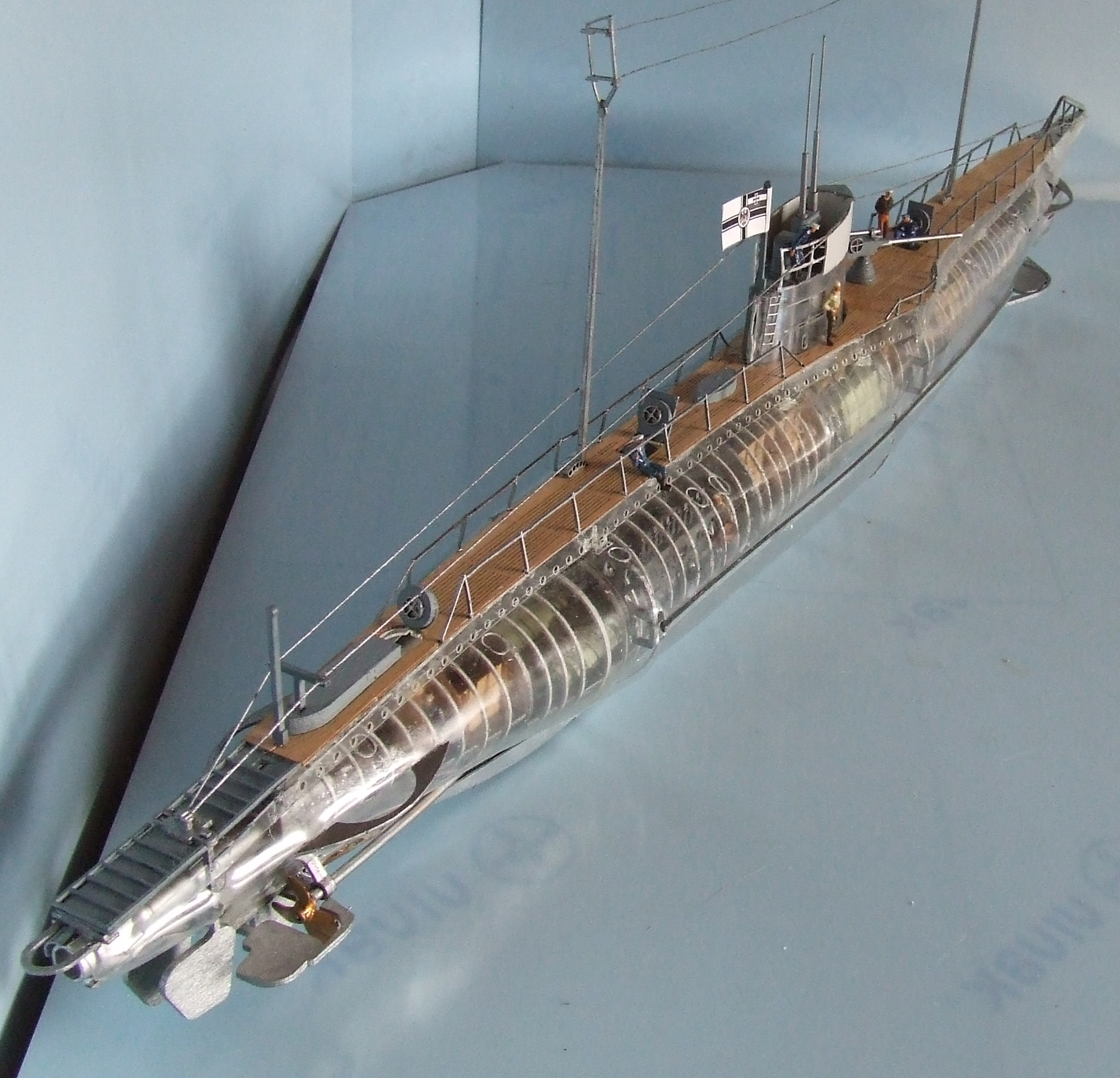

== List of Type UB III submarines ==
There were 96 Type UB III submarines commissioned into the German Imperial Navy.

- SM UB-48
- SM UB-49
- SM UB-50
- SM UB-51
- SM UB-52
- SM UB-53
- SM UB-54
- SM UB-55
- SM UB-56
- SM UB-57
- SM UB-58
- SM UB-59
- SM UB-60
- SM UB-61
- SM UB-62
- SM UB-63
- SM UB-64
- SM UB-65
- SM UB-66
- SM UB-67
- SM UB-68
- SM UB-69
- SM UB-70
- SM UB-71
- SM UB-72
- SM UB-73
- SM UB-74
- SM UB-75
- SM UB-76
- SM UB-77
- SM UB-78
- SM UB-79
- SM UB-80
- SM UB-81
- SM UB-82
- SM UB-83
- SM UB-84
- SM UB-85
- SM UB-86
- SM UB-87
- SM UB-88
- SM UB-89
- SM UB-90
- SM UB-91
- SM UB-92
- SM UB-93
- SM UB-94
- SM UB-95
- SM UB-96
- SM UB-97
- SM UB-98
- SM UB-99
- SM UB-100
- SM UB-101
- SM UB-102
- SM UB-103
- SM UB-104
- SM UB-105
- SM UB-106
- SM UB-107
- SM UB-108
- SM UB-109
- SM UB-110
- SM UB-111
- SM UB-112
- SM UB-113
- SM UB-114
- SM UB-115
- SM UB-116
- SM UB-117
- SM UB-118
- SM UB-119
- SM UB-120
- SM UB-121
- SM UB-122
- SM UB-123
- SM UB-124
- SM UB-125
- SM UB-126
- SM UB-127
- SM UB-128
- SM UB-129
- SM UB-130
- SM UB-131
- SM UB-132
- SM UB-133
- SM UB-136
- SM UB-142
- SM UB-143
- SM UB-144
- SM UB-145
- SM UB-148
- SM UB-149
- SM UB-150
- SM UB-154
- SM UB-155

== Bibliography ==
- Conway's All the World's Fighting Ships 1906–1921
- Bendert, Harald (2000). Die UB-Boote der Kaiserlichen Marine, 1914-1918. Einsätze, Erfolge, Schicksal (in German). Hamburg: Verlag E.S. Mittler & Sohn GmbH. ISBN 3-8132-0713-7.
- Dodson, Aidan; Cant, Serena (2020). Spoils of War: The Fate of Enemy Fleets after the Two World Wars. Barnsley: Seaforth Publishing. ISBN 978-1-5267-4198-1.
- Gröner, Erich; Jung, Dieter; Maass, Martin (1991). U-boats and Mine Warfare Vessels. German Warships 1815–1945. Vol. 2. Translated by Thomas, Keith; Magowan, Rachel. London: Conway Maritime Press. ISBN 0-85177-593-4.
- Rössler, Eberhard (1981). The U-boat: The evolution and technical history of German submarines. London: Cassell & Co. ISBN 0-304-36120-8.
