= E.S. Mittler & Sohn =

German publishing house

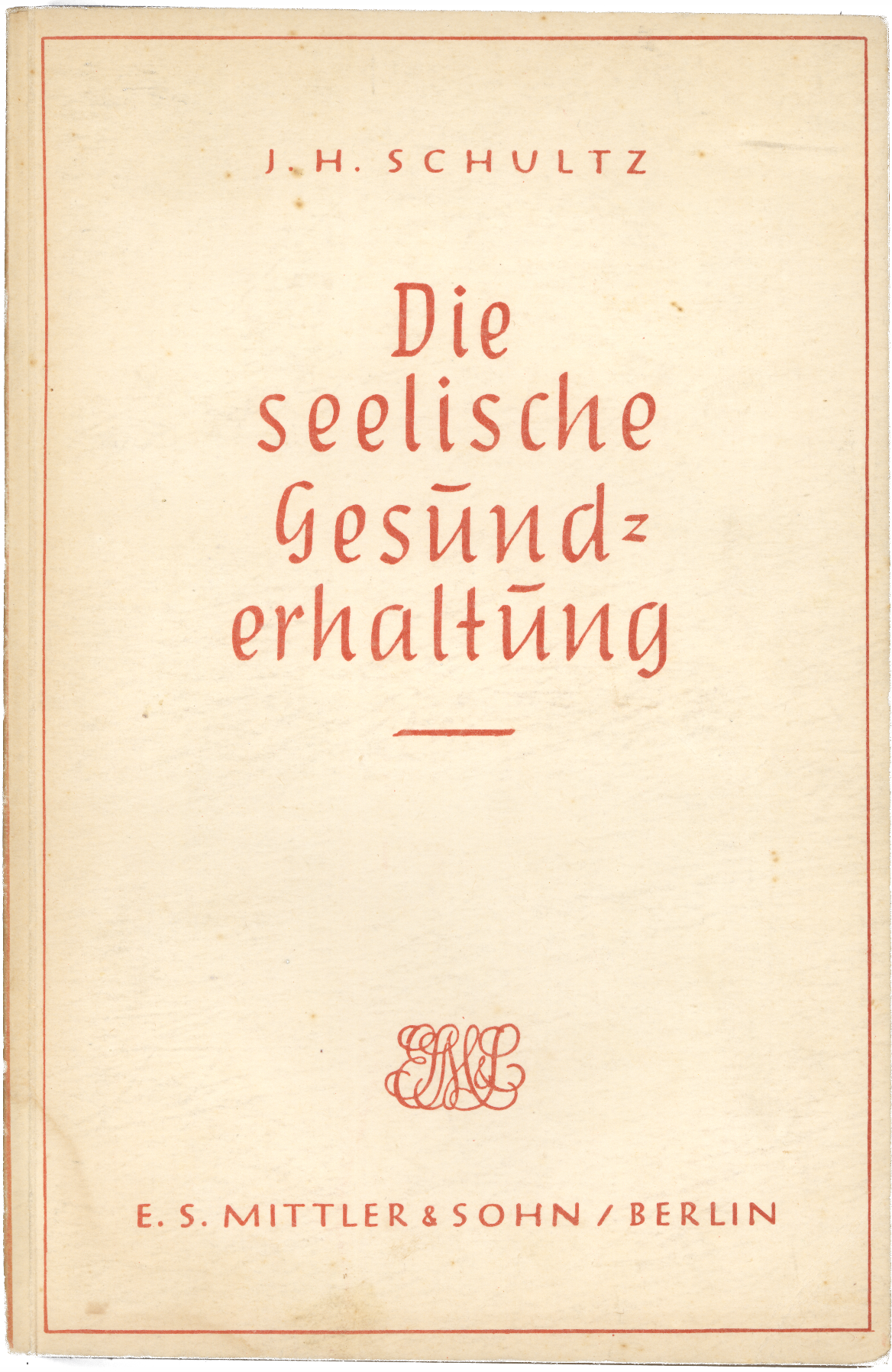
- Cover of the book "Die seelische Gesunderhaltung unter besonderer Berücksichtigung der Kriegsverhältnisse" by J.H. Schultz, E.S. Mittler & Sohn, Berlin, 1941. Schultz is the founder of "Autogenic Training" and one of the founders of psychotherapy in Germany. During the War he was actively involved in discrimination of Homosexuals.
- Founded: 1789
- Founder: Johann Heinrich Wilhelm Dieterici
- Country of origin: Germany
- Headquarters location: Hamburg
- Key people: Ernst Siegfried Mittler
- Nonfiction topics: Military history, national security policy and works of contemporary industrial technology
- Owner(s): Tamm Media
- Official website: www.mittler-books.de

Verlag E.S. Mittler & Sohn GmbH is a German publishing house founded in 1789. Now part of the holdings of Peter Tamm's Tamm Media, it is one of the oldest German publishers still existing.

== History ==
The publishing house was founded in 1789 by Johann Heinrich Wilhelm Dieterici in Berlin. As the business owner he had no male descendant, so the company took the name of his printer's son, Ernst Siegfried Mittler. Later, the family obtained the special privileges of the Prussian royal house. The publishing and printing house became one of the largest publishing houses in Germany and occupied a staff of several hundred people in the nineteenth century.

The catalog of the publisher extended from school books to scientific publications, mainly in the areas of history, philosophy, literature, statistics, directories, atlases and scientific publications. E.S. Mittler und Sohn thus became the main publishing house for military history and literature, and printed the instructions and journals of the armed forces. Although this part of the production of the publisher made less than half of the publications, the company's success was closely tied to the political development of Germany.

The house continues to publish books of military history, national security policy and works of contemporary industrial technology. The house is headquartered in Hamburg, also the current location of the holding company, which is owned by Peter Tamm.

== Sources ==
- Einhundert Jahre des Geschäftshauses Ernst Siegfried Mittler und Sohn. Königliche Hofbuchhandlung und Hofbuchdruckerei in Berlin. Ein Zeitbild. Als Handschrift für Freunde. E. S. Mittler & Sohn Berlin 1889
- E. S. Mittler & Sohn. Königliche Hofbuchhandlung und Hofbuchdruckerei, Berlin. Zum 3. März 1914, dem Gedenktage ihres 125jährigen Bestehens, zugleich ein Rückblick auf ihre Verlagstätigkeit während der letzten 25 Jahre. E. S. Mittler & Sohn, Berlin 1914
- Einhundertfünfzig Jahre E.S. Mittler & Sohn, Verlagsbuchhandlung und Buchdruckerei, 1789–1939. Festschrift zum 3. März 1939 dem Gedenktage des 150 jährigen Bestehens. Verlag E.S. Mittler & Sohn, Berlin 1939
- Gerd Schulz: S. Toeche-Mittler Verlagsbuchhandlung GmbH, vormals E. S. Mittler & Sohn, Berlin: 200 Jahre eines deutschen Verlags, STM Verlag, Darmstadt 1989 ISBN 3-87820-080-3
