= Bernard & Graefe =

German book publisher

Bernard & Graefe is a German book publisher, which since 1991 has been part of the Mönch publishing group. It was founded in 1918 in Königsberg, and publishes a range of non-fiction titles including "the most universally respected books on the German Federal Armed Forces". The parent Monch group specialises in defence and national security topics.
