= German submarine U-121 =

U-121 may refer to one of the following German submarines:

- SM U-121, a Type UE II submarine launched in 1918 and that served in World War I; surrendered 1918; sunk as French gunnery target on 1 July 1921
  - During World War I, Germany also had this submarine with a similar name:
    - SM UB-121, a Type UB III submarine launched in 1918 and surrendered in 1918; wrecked in tow to France 1919
- German submarine U-121 (1940), a Type IIB submarine that served in World War II and was scuttled on 2 May 1945
