= German submarine U-122 =

U-122 may refer to one of the following German submarines:

- SM U-122, a Type UE II submarine launched in 1917 and that served in World War I until surrendered on 26 November 1918; scuttled off the Isle of Wight on 1 July 1921
  - During World War I, Germany also had this submarine with a similar name:
    - SM UB-122, a Type UB III submarine launched in 1918 and surrendered on 24 November 1918; scuttled off the Isle of Wight on 1 July 1921
- German submarine U-122 (1939), a Type IXB submarine that served in World War II until she went missing after 22 June 1940
