= German submarine U-120 (1940) =

German World War II submarine

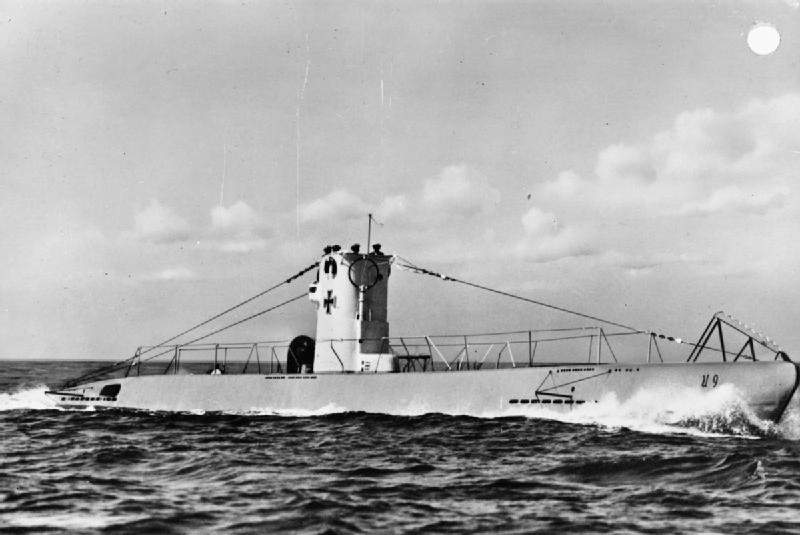
- U-9, a typical Type IIB boat

History

Nazi Germany
- Name: U-120
- Ordered: 28 September 1937
- Builder: Flender Werke, Lübeck
- Yard number: 268
- Laid down: 31 March 1938
- Launched: 16 March 1940
- Commissioned: 20 April 1940
- Fate: Scuttled 5 May 1945 at Bremerhaven. Raised in 1950 and broken up.
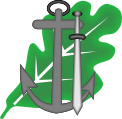
- Badge

General characteristics
- Class & type: Type IIB coastal submarine
- Displacement: 279 t (275 long tons) surfaced; 328 t (323 long tons) submerged
- Length: 42.70 m (140 ft 1 in) o/a; 27.80 m (91 ft 2 in) pressure hull
- Beam: 4.08 m (13 ft 5 in) (o/a); 4.00 m (13 ft 1 in) (pressure hull)
- Height: 8.60 m (28 ft 3 in)
- Draught: 3.90 m (12 ft 10 in)
- Installed power: 700 PS (510 kW; 690 bhp) (diesels); 410 PS (300 kW; 400 shp) (electric)
- Propulsion: 2 shafts; 2 × diesel engines; 2 × electric motors
- Speed: 13 knots (24 km/h; 15 mph) surfaced; 7 knots (13 km/h; 8.1 mph) submerged
- Range: 1,800 nmi (3,300 km; 2,100 mi) at 12 knots (22 km/h; 14 mph) surfaced; 35–43 nmi (65–80 km; 40–49 mi) at 4 knots (7.4 km/h; 4.6 mph) submerged
- Test depth: 80 m (260 ft)
- Complement: 3 officers, 22 men
- Armament: 3 × 53.3 cm (21 in) torpedo tubes; 5 × torpedoes or up to 12 TMA or 18 TMB mines; 1 × 2 cm (0.79 in) anti-aircraft gun

Service record
- Part of: U-boat School Flotilla; 20 April – 30 June 1940; 21st U-boat Flotilla; 1 July 1940 – 16 March 1945; 31st U-boat Flotilla; 17 March – 5 May 1945
- Identification codes: M 03 700
- Commanders: Oblt.z.S. Ernst Bauer; 20 April – 25 November 1940; Kptlt. Wolfgang Heyda; 26 November 1940 – 19 May 1941; Oblt.z.S. Willy-Roderich Körner; 20 May 1941 – 24 February 1942; Oblt.z.S. Hans Fiedler; 25 February – 30 September 1942; Lt.z.S. Alfred Radermacher; 15 September 1942 – 24 May 1943; Lt.z.S. Adolf Gundlach; 24 May 1943 – 26 July 1943; Oblt.z.S. Joachim Sauerbier; 26 July 1943 – 14 September 1944; Lt.z.S. / Oblt.z.S. Rolf Rüdiger Bensel; 15 September 1944 – 2 May 1945
- Operations: No patrols
- Victories: No ships sunk or damaged

German submarine U-120 was a Type IIB U-boat of Nazi Germany's Kriegsmarine during World War II. She was laid down on 31 March 1938 at the Flender Werke, Lübeck as yard number 268. She was launched on 16 March 1940 and commissioned on 20 April under Oberleutnant zur See (Oblt.z.S.) Ernst Bauer.

== Emblem ==
U-120's emblem was an oak leaf, with an anchor, and a dagger. She also shared this emblem with U-3, U-29, U-747, U-1274 and U-1308.

== Built for China ==
The Chinese Nationalist government used 10,000,000 Marks to order two Type IIB U-boats in 1937. They also dispatched 80 men to Germany for training in submarine operations. The Japanese government complained about this transaction, so the Chinese took their money back and these two vessels joined the Kriegsmarine after the outbreak of the Second World War in Europe. They were U-120 and U-121.

== Design ==
German Type IIB submarines were enlarged versions of the original Type IIs. U-120 had a displacement of 279 tonnes (275 long tons) when at the surface and 328 tonnes (323 long tons) while submerged. Officially, the standard tonnage was 250 long tons (254 t), however. The U-boat had a total length of 42.70 m (140 ft 1 in), a pressure hull length of 28.20 m (92 ft 6 in), a beam of 4.08 m (13 ft 5 in), a height of 8.60 m (28 ft 3 in), and a draught of 3.90 m (12 ft 10 in). The submarine was powered by two MWM RS 127 S four-stroke, six-cylinder diesel engines of 700 metric horsepower (510 kW; 690 shp) for cruising, two Siemens-Schuckert PG VV 322/36 double-acting electric motors producing a total of 460 metric horsepower (340 kW; 450 shp) for use while submerged. She had two shafts and two 0.85 m (3 ft) propellers. The boat was capable of operating at depths of up to 80–150 metres (260–490 ft).

The submarine had a maximum surface speed of 12 knots (22 km/h; 14 mph) and a maximum submerged speed of 7 knots (13 km/h; 8.1 mph). When submerged, the boat could operate for 35–42 nautical miles (65–78 km; 40–48 mi) at 4 knots (7.4 km/h; 4.6 mph); when surfaced, she could travel 3,800 nautical miles (7,000 km; 4,400 mi) at 8 knots (15 km/h; 9.2 mph). U-120 was fitted with three 53.3 cm (21 in) torpedo tubes at the bow, five torpedoes or up to twelve Type A torpedo mines, and a 2 cm (0.79 in) anti-aircraft gun. The boat had a complement of twenty five.

== Service history ==
U-120 was active from 1940 until she was scuttled in 1945. She was one of two Type II U-boats built at the Flender Werke in Lübeck. Along with her sister boat U-121, she was originally built for export to China. The advent of World War II and increased training needs, led the German high command to assign U-120 and U-121 to the training command. From 20 April 1940 to 30 June she was part of the U-Bootschulflottille. In July 1940 she became part of the 21st U-boat Flotilla as a training boat until 16 March 1945 when she became part of the 31st U-boat Flotilla (training) until 5 May 1945 when she was scuttled at Bremerhaven. The boat was raised in 1950 and broken up for scrap.

Many sources incorrectly report that U-120 sank due to a malfunctioning toilet. This submarine was actually the much larger U-1206. (Note: Sources asserting incorrectly that U-120 sank because of a malfunctioning toilet include: Justin Heimberg; David Gomberg (2009). Would You Rather...?'s Read It and Wipe: Condensed Comedy for the Can. Seven Footer Press. p. 69. ISBN 978-1-934734-10-0.; David Hatcher Childress (2001). A Hitchhiker's Guide to Armageddon. Adventures Unlimited Press. p. 154. ISBN 978-0-932813-84-8.; James F. Dunnigan; Albert A. Nofi (1994). Dirty little secrets of World War II: military information no one told you about the greatest, most terrible war in history. W. Morrow. p. 273. ISBN 978-0-688-12235-5.; Mark Mirabello (2009). Handbook for Rebels and Outlaws. Mark Mirabello. p. 185. ISBN 978-1-906958-00-8.; Sources reporting U-1206 sank because of a malfunctioning toilet include: Williamson, Gordon (2006). Wolf Pack: The Story of the U-Boat in World War II. Osprey. p. 166. ISBN 978-1-84603-141-0.; Williamson, Gordon; Pavlović, Darko (2001). Grey Wolf: U-Boat Crewman of World War II. Osprey. p. 26. ISBN 978-1-84176-312-5.; Clay Blair (1998). Hitler's U-boat War: The hunted, 1942-1945. Random House. p. 673. ISBN 978-0-679-45742-8.)

== Bibliography ==
- Busch, Rainer; Röll, Hans-Joachim (1999). German U-boat commanders of World War II : a biographical dictionary. Translated by Brooks, Geoffrey. London, Annapolis, Md: Greenhill Books, Naval Institute Press. ISBN 1-55750-186-6.
- Busch, Rainer; Röll, Hans-Joachim (1999). Deutsche U-Boot-Verluste von September 1939 bis Mai 1945 [German U-boat losses from September 1939 to May 1945]. Der U-Boot-Krieg (in German). Vol. IV. Hamburg, Berlin, Bonn: Mittler. ISBN 3-8132-0514-2.
- Gröner, Erich; Jung, Dieter; Maass, Martin (1991). German Warships 1815–1945, U-boats and Mine Warfare Vessels. Vol. 2. Translated by Thomas, Keith; Magowan, Rachel. London: Conway Maritime Press. ISBN 0-85177-593-4.
- Blair, Clay (1996). Hitler's U-Boat War: The Hunters 1939-1942. New York: Random House. ISBN 0-394-58839-8.
