= German submarine U-120 =

U-120 may refer to one of the following German submarines:

- SM U-120, a Type UE II submarine launched in 1918 that served in the First World War and was surrendered in 1918
  - During the First World War, Germany also had this submarine with a similar name:
    - SM UB-120, a Type UB III submarine launched in 1918 and surrendered in 1918
- German submarine U-120 (1940), a Type IIB submarine that served in the Second World War and was scuttled on 2 May 1945
