= SM U-126 =

WW1 German submarine

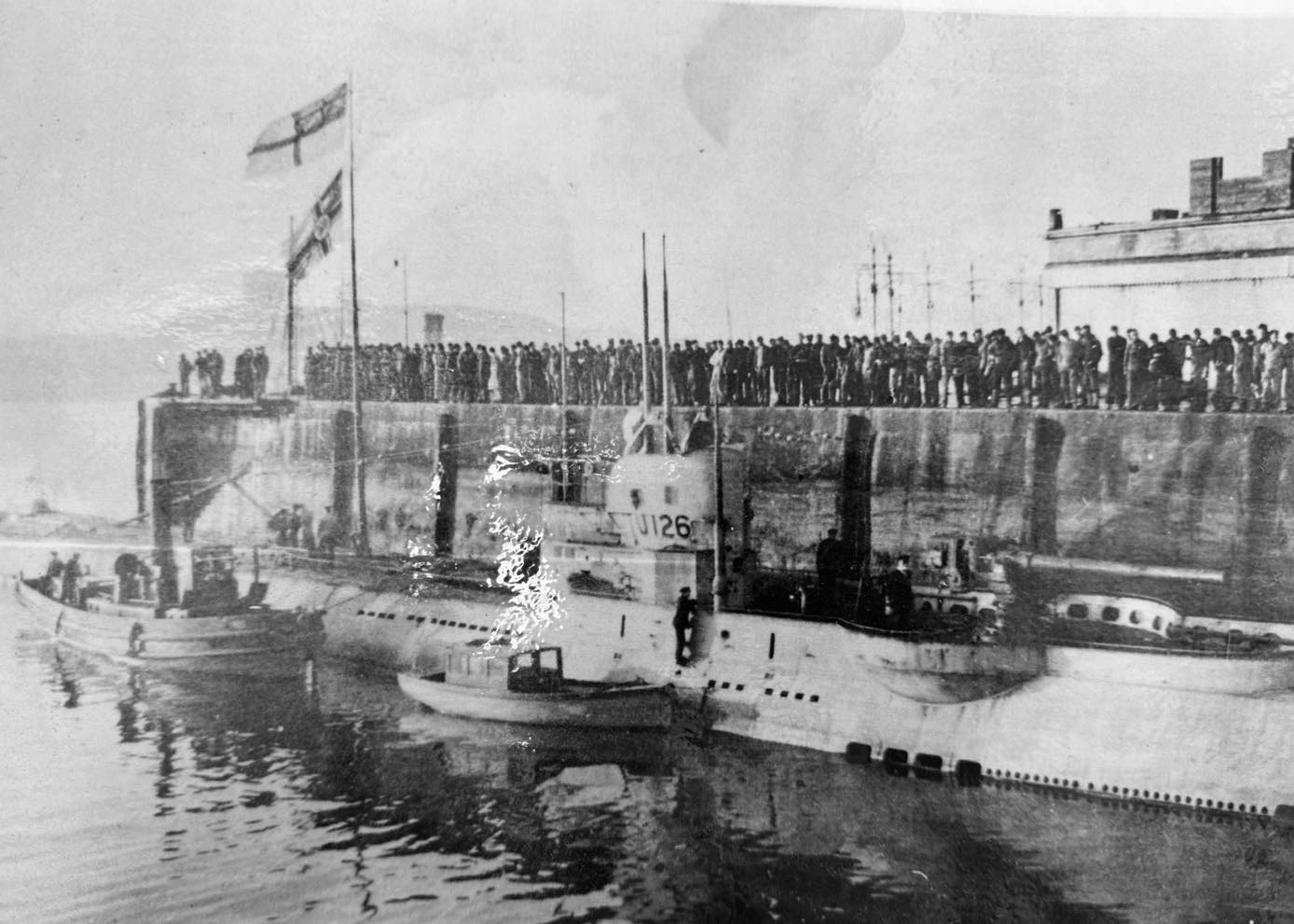
- SM U-126 moored at Victoria Wharf in Plymouth UK

History

German Empire
- Name: U-126
- Ordered: 27 May 1916
- Builder: Blohm & Voss, Hamburg
- Yard number: 303
- Launched: 16 June 1918
- Commissioned: 7 October 1918
- Fate: Surrendered 22 November 1918

General characteristics
- Class & type: Type UE II submarine
- Type: Coastal minelaying submarine
- Displacement: 1,163 t (1,145 long tons) surfaced; 1,468 t (1,445 long tons) submerged
- Length: 82.00 m (269 ft) (o/a); 61.32 m (201 ft 2 in) (pressure hull)
- Beam: 7.42 m (24 ft 4 in)
- Height: 10.16 m (33 ft 4 in)
- Draught: 4.22 m (13 ft 10 in)
- Installed power: 2 × diesel engines, 2,400 PS (1,765 kW; 2,367 shp); 2 × electric motors, 1,235 PS (908 kW; 1,218 shp)
- Propulsion: 2 shafts, 2 × 1.61 m (5 ft 3 in) propellers
- Speed: 14.7 knots (27.2 km/h; 16.9 mph) surfaced; 7.2 knots (13.3 km/h; 8.3 mph) submerged
- Range: 11,470 nmi (21,240 km; 13,200 mi) at 8 knots (15 km/h; 9.2 mph) surfaced; 35 nmi (65 km; 40 mi) at 4.5 knots (8.3 km/h; 5.2 mph) submerged
- Test depth: 75 m (246 ft)
- Complement: 4 officers, 36 enlisted
- Armament: 4 × 50 cm (19.7 in) bow torpedo tubes; 12 torpedoes; 2 × 100 cm (39 in) stern mine chutes; 42 mines; 1 × 15 cm (5.9 in) SK L/45 deck gun; 494 rounds

Service record
- Commanders: Kptlt. Otto Wünsche; 7 October – 11 November 1918
- Operations: None
- Victories: None

SM U-126 (Note: "SM" stands for "Seiner Majestät" (English: His Majesty's) and combined with the U for Unterseeboot would be translated as His Majesty's Submarine.) was one of the 329 submarines serving in the Imperial German Navy in World War I. U-126 was engaged in the naval warfare and took part in the First Battle of the Atlantic.

== Design ==
Type UE II submarines were preceded by the shorter Type UE I submarines. U-126 had a displacement of 1,163 tonnes (1,145 long tons) when at the surface and 1,468 tonnes (1,445 long tons) while submerged. she had a total length of 82 metres (269 ft), a beam of 7.42 m (24 ft 4 in), a height of 10.16 m (33 ft 4 in), and a draught of 4.22 m (13 ft 10 in). The submarine was powered by two 2,400 metric horsepower (1,800 kW; 2,400 shp) engines for use while surfaced, and two 1,235 metric horsepower (908 kW; 1,218 shp) engines for use while submerged. She had two shafts and two 1.61 m (5.3 ft) propellers. She was capable of operating at depths of up to 75 metres (246 ft).

The submarine had a maximum surface speed of 14.7 knots (27.2 km/h; 16.9 mph) and a maximum submerged speed of 7.2 knots (13.3 km/h; 8.3 mph). When submerged, she could operate for 35 nautical miles (65 km; 40 mi) at 4.5 knots (8.3 km/h; 5.2 mph); when surfaced, she could travel 11,470 nautical miles (21,240 km; 13,200 mi) at 8 knots (15 km/h; 9.2 mph). U-126 was fitted with four 50 centimetres (20 in) torpedo tubes (fitted at its bow), twelve torpedoes, two 100 centimetres (39 in) mine chutes (fitted at its stern), forty-two mines, one 15 cm (5.9 in) SK L/45 deck gun, and 494 rounds. She had a complement of forty (thirty-six crew members and four officers).

== Bibliography ==
- Gröner, Erich; Jung, Dieter; Maass, Martin (1991). U-boats and Mine Warfare Vessels. German Warships 1815–1945. Vol. 2. Translated by Thomas, Keith; Magowan, Rachel. London: Conway Maritime Press. ISBN 0-85177-593-4.
