= German submarine U-3 (1935) =

German World War II submarine

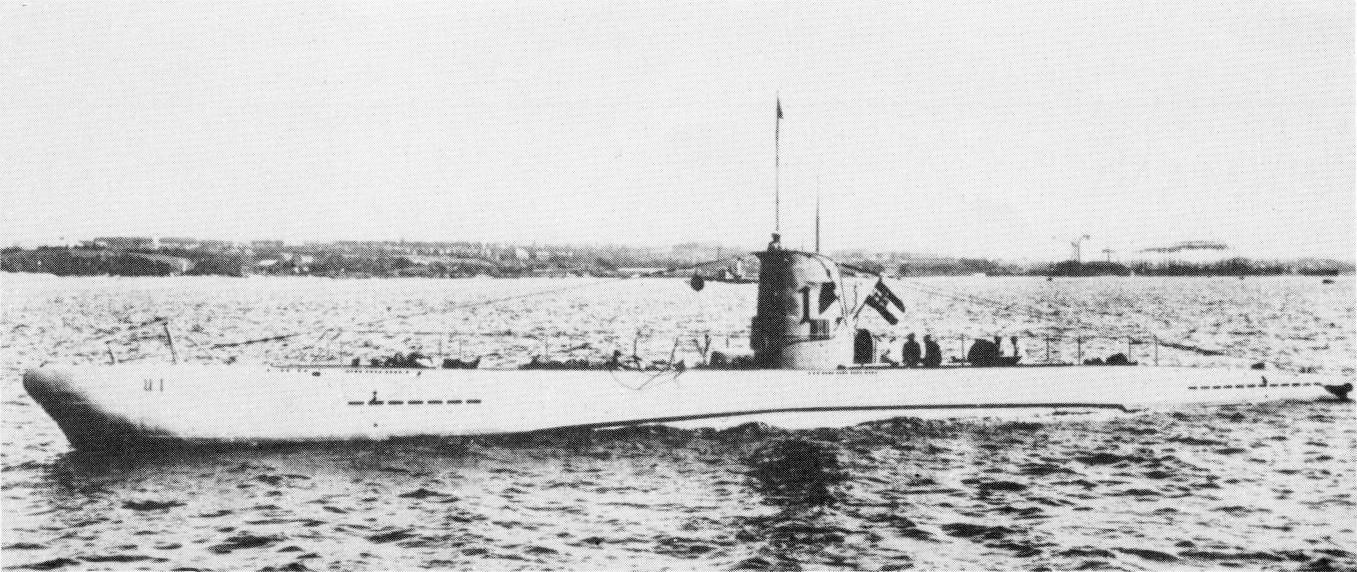
- U-1, the first Type II boat

History

Nazi Germany
- Name: U-3
- Ordered: 2 February 1935
- Builder: Deutsche Werke, Kiel
- Cost: 1,500,000 Reichsmark
- Yard number: 238
- Laid down: 11 February 1935
- Launched: 19 July 1935
- Commissioned: 6 September 1935
- Stricken: 1 August 1944 at Gotenhafen
- Fate: Stricken, 1 August 1944. Scrapped 1945
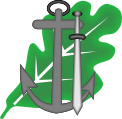
- Badge

General characteristics
- Class & type: Type IIA coastal submarine
- Displacement: 254 t (250 long tons) surfaced; 303 t (298 long tons) submerged; 381 t (375 long tons) total
- Length: 40.90 m (134 ft 2 in) (o/a); 27.80 m (91 ft 2 in) (pressure hull)
- Beam: 4.08 m (13 ft 5 in) (o/a); 4.00 m (13 ft 1 in) (pressure hull)
- Height: 8.60 m (28 ft 3 in)
- Draught: 3.83 m (12 ft 7 in)
- Installed power: 700 PS (510 kW; 690 shp) (diesels); 360 PS (260 kW; 360 shp) (electric)
- Propulsion: 2 × propeller shafts; 2 × 0.85 m (2 ft 9 in) three-bladed propellers; 2 × diesel engines; 2 × double-acting electric motors
- Speed: 13 knots (24 km/h; 15 mph) surfaced; 6.9 knots (12.8 km/h; 7.9 mph) submerged
- Range: 1,050 nmi (1,940 km; 1,210 mi) at 12 knots (22 km/h; 14 mph) surfaced; 35 nmi (65 km; 40 mi) at 4 knots (7.4 km/h; 4.6 mph) submerged
- Test depth: 80 m (260 ft)
- Complement: 3 officers, 22 men
- Armament: 3 × 53.3 cm (21 in) torpedo tubes; 5 × torpedoes or up to 12 TMA or 18 TMB mines; 1 × 2 cm (0.79 in) anti-aircraft gun

Service record
- Part of: U-boat School Flotilla; 1 August 1935 – 1 February 1940; 1 March – 1 April 1940; 1 May – 30 June 1940; 21st U-boat Flotilla; 1 July 1940 – 1 August 1944
- Identification codes: M 01 385
- Commanders: Oblt.z.S. Hans Meckel; 6 August 1935 – 29 September 1937; Kptlt. Ernst-Günter Heinicke; 30 September 1937 – July 1938; Oblt.z.S. / Kptlt. Joachim Schepke; 29 October 1938 – 2 January 1940; Kptlt. Gerd Schreiber; 3 January – 28 July 1940; Kptlt. Helmut Franzke; 29 July – 10 November 1940; Kptlt. Otto von Bülow; 11 November 1940 – 2 July 1941; Oblt.z.S. Hans-Hartwig Trojer; 3 July 1941 – 2 March 1942; Oblt.z.S. Joachim Zander; 3 March – 30 September 1942; Oblt.z.S. Herbert Zoller; 1 October 1942 – 18 May 1943; Oblt.z.S. Ernst Hartmann; 19 May 1943 – 9 June 1944; Lt.z.S. Hermann Neumeister; 10 June – 16 July 1944
- Operations: 5 patrols: 1st patrol: 4 – 8 September 1939; 2nd patrol: 13 – 24 September 1939; 3rd patrol: 27 September – 3 October 1939; 4th patrol: 16 – 29 March 1940; 5th patrol: 12 – 19 April 1940
- Victories: 2 merchant ships sunk (2,348 GRT)

German submarine U-3 was a Type IIA U-boat laid down at the Deutsche Werke in Kiel on 11 February 1935 as yard number 238. She was commissioned into the Kriegsmarine on 6 August 1936 under the command of Oberleutnant zur See (Oblt.z.S.) Hans Meckel.

U-3 carried out a total of five combat patrols; she sank two ships while under the command of Joachim Schepke. During April 1940, she was part of the fleet that supported the German invasion of Norway, Operation Weserübung.

As the Type II submarines were too small for combat duty in the Atlantic Ocean, she was assigned to the Baltic for training duties with the 21st U-boat Flotilla, a training outfit.

== Emblem ==
U-3 is known to have had three emblems; one was an oak leaf, with an anchor and a dagger. She also shared this emblem with U-29, U-120, U-747, U-1274 and U-1308.

== Design ==
German Type II submarines were based on the Finnish submarine Vesikko. U-3 had a displacement of 254 tonnes (250 long tons) when at the surface and 303 tonnes (298 long tons) while submerged. Officially, the standard tonnage was 250 long tons (250 t), however. The U-boat had a total length of 40.90 m (134 ft 2 in), a pressure hull length of 27.80 m (91 ft 2 in), a beam of 4.08 m (13 ft 5 in), a height of 8.60 m (28 ft 3 in), and a draught of 3.83 m (12 ft 7 in). The submarine was powered by two MWM RS 127 S four-stroke, six-cylinder diesel engines of 700 metric horsepower (510 kW; 690 shp) for cruising, two Siemens-Schuckert PG VV 322/36 double-acting electric motors producing a total of 360 metric horsepower (260 kW; 360 shp) for use while submerged. She had two shafts and two 0.85 m (3 ft) propellers. The boat was capable of operating at depths of up to 80–150 metres (260–490 ft).

The submarine had a maximum surface speed of 13 knots (24 km/h; 15 mph) and a maximum submerged speed of 6.9 knots (12.8 km/h; 7.9 mph). When submerged, the boat could operate for 35 nautical miles (65 km; 40 mi) at 4 knots (7.4 km/h; 4.6 mph); when surfaced, she could travel 1,600 nautical miles (3,000 km; 1,800 mi) at 8 knots (15 km/h; 9.2 mph). U-3 was fitted with three 53.3 cm (21 in) torpedo tubes at the bow, five torpedoes or up to twelve Type A torpedo mines, and a 2 cm (0.79 in) anti-aircraft gun. The boat had a complement of 25.

== Operational history ==
=== First and second patrols ===
The boat's first patrol was relatively uneventful.

Her second sortie was toward the British east Anglian coast.

=== Third patrol ===
She sank the Danish ship Vendia and the Swedish vessel Gun for a total of 2,348 gross register tons (GRT) on 30 September 1939.

U-3 closed Vendia and as was common practice in the early days of the war, ordered her to stop after a few warning shots were fired. The ship's fate is disputed. The German submariners said the Danish vessel tried to ram the U-boat. The ship's crew were convinced she swung with the strength of the wind. A torpedo was fired which hit the vessel and sank her.

The Gun was attacked in the Skagerrak 30 nmi (56 km; 35 mi) northwest of Hanstholm. By now wary from the experience with Vendia, the U-boat sent a boarding party to the Swedish ship, but was obliged to dive by the arrival of HMS Thistle. U-3 fired a torpedo at the British submarine, which missed; indeed they were not aware they had been targeted. The Thistle left the area and came across a lifeboat from Gun, telling the Swedes in it to return to their ship as she was still afloat. The German boarding party had left the ship in a lifeboat, but were picked up by the Danish merchant ship Dagmar. U-3 recovered them and put a torpedo into the empty Gun, sinking her.

=== Fourth and fifth patrols ===
Patrol number four was also quiet, but number five was enlivened by another British submarine, HMS Porpoise, firing six torpedoes 10 nmi (19 km; 12 mi) west of Egersund at the U-boat on 16 April 1940. They were originally thought to have been aimed at U-1, but the attack caused no damage.

== Fate ==
U-3 was stricken on 1 August 1944 in Gotenhafen. She was captured by Great Britain on 3 May 1945 and scrapped that same year.

== Summary of raiding history ==
| Date | Name | Nationality | Tonnage (GRT) | Fate |
|---|---|---|---|---|
| 30 September 1939 | Vendia | Denmark | 1,150 | Sunk |
| 1 October 1939 | Gun | Sweden | 1,198 | Sunk |

== Bibliography ==
- Busch, Rainer; Röll, Hans-Joachim (1999). German U-boat commanders of World War II : a biographical dictionary. Translated by Brooks, Geoffrey. London, Annapolis, Md: Greenhill Books, Naval Institute Press. ISBN 1-55750-186-6.
- Gröner, Erich; Jung, Dieter; Maass, Martin (1991). U-boats and Mine Warfare Vessels. German Warships 1815–1945. Vol. 2. Translated by Thomas, Keith; Magowan, Rachel. London: Conway Maritime Press. ISBN 0-85177-593-4.
- Rössler, Eberhard (1979). Die deutschen U-Boote und ihre Werften: eine Bilddokumentation über den deutschen U-Bootbau; in zwei Bänden (in German). Vol. I. Munich: Bernard & Graefe. ISBN 3-7637-5213-7.
