= Otto Schuhart =

German submarine commander

- Born: 4 September 1909; Hamburg, German Empire
- Died: 10 March 1990 (aged 80); Stuttgart, Baden-Württemberg, West Germany
- Military career
- Allegiance: Weimar Republic (to 1933); Nazi Germany (to 1945); West Germany
- Branch: Reichsmarine; Kriegsmarine; German Navy
- Service years: 1929–45, 1955–67
- Rank: Korvettenkapitän (Wehrmacht); Kapitän zur See (Bundeswehr)
- Commands: U-8, U-25, U-29; 21st U-boat Flotilla
- Conflicts: World War II: Battle of the Atlantic
- Awards: Knight's Cross of the Iron Cross; Federal Cross of Merit 1st class

Otto Schuhart (4 September 1909 – 10 March 1990) was a German submarine commander during World War II, who commanded the U-boat U-29 and was credited with the sinking of the aircraft carrier HMS Courageous on 17 September 1939, the first British warship sunk in the war by enemy action. In total, Schuhart claimed thirteen ships sunk on seven war patrols, for a total of 67,277 gross register tons (GRT) of Allied merchant shipping and one warship of 22,500 long tons (22,900 tonnes).

Born in Hamburg, Schuhart joined the Reichsmarine (navy) of the Weimar Republic in 1929. After a period of training on surface vessels he transferred to the U-boat force in 1936. Following the sinking of HMS Courageous the entire crew of U-29 received the Iron Cross 2nd Class while Schuhart as commander received both classes of the Iron Cross, 2nd and 1st Class. After a further six war patrols, Schuhart became commander of the 1. U-Lehr Division ("1st U-boat Training Division") and later of the 21st U-boat Flotilla. He spent the last months of the war at the Naval Academy at Mürwik. After World War II he worked in various civil jobs and in 1955 rejoined military service in the Bundesmarine of the Bundeswehr of the Federal Republic of Germany. He retired in 1967 and died on 10 March 1990 in Stuttgart.

== Early life and pre-war service ==
Schuhart was born on 4 September 1909 in Hamburg, then in the German Empire. He began his naval career with the Reichsmarine on 1 April 1929 as a member of "Crew 29" (the incoming class of 1929). (Note: The German Reichsmarine which was renamed the Kriegsmarine on 1 June 1935.) He underwent basic military training in the 2nd department of the standing ship division of the Baltic Sea in Stralsund (1 April 1929 – 30 June 1929). (Note: 2nd department —II. Abteilung) (Note: standing ship division —Schiffsstammdivision) Schuhart was then transferred to the training ship Niobe (1 July 1929 – 11 October 1929), attaining the rank of Seekadett (midshipman) on 10 October 1929. He then underwent a training course at the Naval Academy at Mürwik (12 October 1929 – 5 January 1930) before serving on the light cruisers Emden (6 January 1930 – 21 May 1930) and Karlsruhe (22 May 1930 – 4 January 1931).

Emden at the time was under the command of Lothar von Arnauld de la Perière, a U-boat commander during World War I. Schuhart sailed on Emden's third training cruise, which started on 13 January 1930 and took him and her crew to Madeira, Saint Thomas, New Orleans, Kingston/Jamaica, San Juan/Puerto Rico, Charlestown and back to Germany via Las Palmas and Santa Cruz. They returned to Wilhelmshaven on 13 May 1930. Karlsruhe's first training cruise left Kiel 24 May 1930 and took its crew through the Suez Canal via the Mediterranean Sea. They then proceeded down Africa's east coast, around the Cape of Good Hope to the Angra Pequena and the Walvis Bay. The cruise continued to Lobito, Angola, where they stopped before heading to South America, from here they headed back to Germany via Vigo, Spain. They arrived back in Kiel on 12 December 1930. While stationed on Karlsruhe, he advanced in rank to Fähnrich zur See (officer cadet) on 1 January 1931.

Schuhart then underwent a number of cadet training courses from 5 January 1931 to 30 September 1932. These courses included a naval infantry course for cadets at Stralsund (5 January 1931 – 2 April 1931), (Note: infantry course for cadets—Infanterielehrgang für Fähnriche) the main cadet course at the Naval Academy in Mürwik (3 April 1931 – 29 March 1932), (Note: main cadet course—Hauptlehrgang für Fähnriche) a torpedo course in Mürwik (30 March – 25 May 1932), (Note: torpedo course for cadets—Torpedolehrgang für Fähnriche) an artillery course for cadets at Kiel-Wik (26 May – 30 July 1932), (Note: artillery course for cadets—Artillerielehrgang für Fähnriche) an anti-aircraft artillery course at Wilhelmshaven (31 July – 15 August 1932), (Note: anti-aircraft artillery course for cadets—Fla-Waffenlehrgang für Fähnriche) a pathfinder course for cadets at Kiel-Wik (16 August – 7 September 1932), (Note: pathfinder course for cadets—Sperrlehrgang für Fähnriche) and lastly a communication course for cadets at Mürwik again (8–30 September 1932). (Note: communication course for cadets—Nachrichtenlehrgang für Fähnriche) On 1 October 1932 Schuhart was assigned to the pre-dreadnought Schleswig-Holstein where he stayed until 25 September 1934. On this assignment he was promoted to Leutnant zur See (second lieutenant) on 1 October 1933. His stay was briefly interrupted by a radio communication course at Mürwik (3 January – 29 March 1934). (Note: radio communication course—Funklehrgang) After service as a company commander in the 3rd Naval Artillery Department (26 September 1934 – 30 September 1937) at Swinemünde where he was promoted to Oberleutnant zur See (first lieutenant) on 1 June 1935, (Note: 3rd Naval Artillery Department—III. Marine-Artillerieabteilung) Schuhart joined Unterseebootsflottille Weddingen as an aide-de-camp on 1 October 1936. (Note: Aide-de-camp—Flaggleutnant) He attended another torpedo training course at Mürwik from 5 October 1937 to 31 October 1937 before being appointed company officer with the Unterseebootsflottille Emsmann and Hundius (1 November 1937 – 29 January 1938). On 12 July 1938 he served as officer of the watch on board of U-25, based in Wilhelmshaven. In 1938 he became commander of U-8 in the U-Bootschule. In December 1938 he was given command of U-25. On 4 April 1939 Schuhart was transferred to U-29 in the Unterseebootsflottille Saltzwedel.

== World War II ==
U-29 left Wilhelmshaven on 19 August 1939, 12 days before the German Invasion of Poland which marked the beginning of World War II. Oberleutnant zur See Georg Lassen, who had joined U-29 four days earlier, was Schuhart's I. Wachoffizier (first officer) on all seven of his combat patrols. U-29 sailed at 08:00 in company with U-28 (Günter Kuhnke), U-33 (Hans-Wilhelm von Dresky), U-34 (Wilhelm Rollmann), U-37 (Heinrich Schuch), U-38 (Heinrich Liebe), U-39 (Gerhard Glattes), U-40 (Werner von Schmidt) and U-41 (Gustav-Adolf Mugler). The last five U-boats belonged to the Unterseebootsflottille Hundius. Schuhart's orders were to patrol the North Atlantic west of Ireland. The approach was largely uneventful and was made mostly submerged up to the Faroe Islands due to the numerous fishing boats in the North Sea. U-29 reached the patrol area on 28 August.

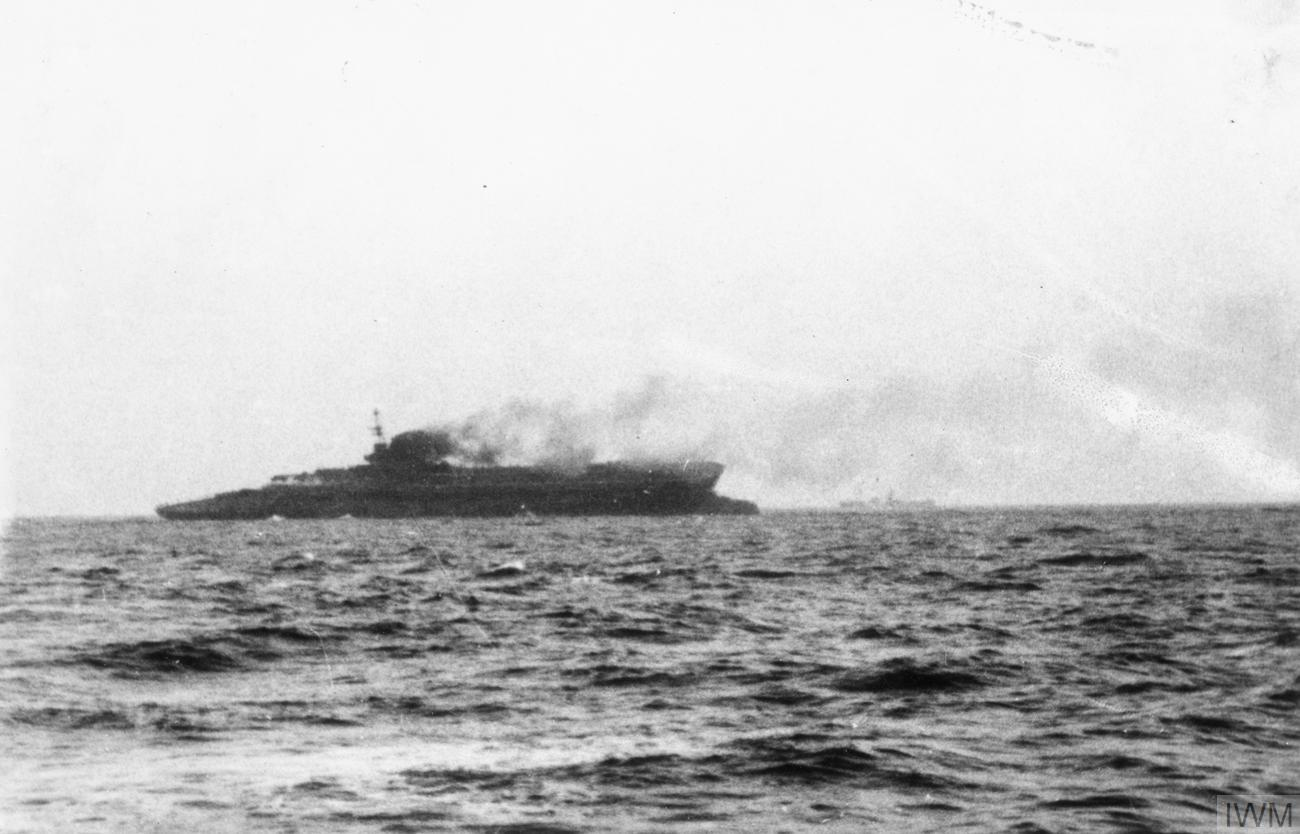
Courageous sinking after being torpedoed by U-29

Immediately after the outbreak of World War II on 17 September 1939, Schuhart encountered the British aircraft carrier HMS Courageous. After stalking her for two hours, Schuhart saw his opportunity when Courageous turned into the wind to launch her aircraft. This manoeuvre put the ship right across the bow of the U-29, which then fired three torpedoes. Two of the torpedoes struck the ship on her port side, and she capsized and sank in 15 minutes with the loss of 518 of her crew, including her captain. During the war Schuhart also sank twelve merchant ships, totalling 67,277 tons. After transferring back to shore-based service, Schuhart became commander of 1. U-Lehr Division ("1st U-boat Training Division") and later of 21st U-boat Flotilla in Pillau. From 1944 to 1945 he was commander of naval college I./Marineschule Flensburg-Mürwik. After the German capitulation he commanded a naval infantry battalion until August 1945. Until December 1945 he served in the German mine clearing service.

== Personal and later life ==
Schuhart married Irmgard Wellner, the widow of his Crew 29 comrade Kapitänleutnant Horst Wellner, commander of U-16. The marriage produced two children. Wellner and the entire crew of U-16 had been killed in action on 25 October 1939; the submarine had been sunk by HMS Puffin and HMS Cayton Wyke.

Following Schuhart's release from military service he worked at a factory in Satrup from January to July 1946. He then underwent training at the Gothaer fire insurance company in Hamburg until July 1947. From August 1947 to September 1948 he worked for a transportation firm in Hamburg before working for the childcare of the Evangelical Relief Fund. (Note: childcare of the Evangelical Relief Fund—Jugendfürsorge des Evangelischen Hilfswerk) He was head of the vocational education department of the H. C. Stülcken Sohn shipbuilding company located in Hamburg from April 1951 until 30 November 1955. On 3 December 1955 Schuhart entered the Bundeswehr where he served in various land based capacities. Upon his retirement on 30 September 1967, he received the Bundesverdienstkreuz I class.

== Summary of career ==
As commander of U-29 Schuhart is credited with the sinking of 12 ships for a total of 67,277 gross register tons (GRT) and one warship, the Courageous, of 22,500 long tons (22,900 tonnes).

=== Awards ===
- Wehrmacht Long Service Award 4th Class (2 October 1936)
- Iron Cross (1939)
  - 2nd Class (26 September 1939)
  - 1st Class (26 September 1939)
- War Merit Cross
  - 2nd Class (30 January 1944)
  - 1st Class (1 September 1944)
- U-boat War Badge (1939) (16 December 1939)
- Knight's Cross of the Iron Cross on 16 May 1940 as Kapitänleutnant and commander of U-29
- Officer's Cross, Order of Merit of the Federal Republic of Germany (30 September 1967)

=== Promotions ===
10 October 1929:	Seekadett (Midshipman)
1 January 1931:	Fähnrich zur See (Officer Cadet)
1 April 1934:	Oberfähnrich zur See (Senior Ensign)
1 October 1933:	Leutnant zur See (Second Lieutenant)
1 June 1935:	Oberleutnant zur See (First Lieutenant)
1 August 1938:	Kapitänleutnant (Captain Lieutenant)
1 April 1943:	Korvettenkapitän (Corvette Captain)
16 June 1956:	Fregattenkapitän (Frigate Captain)
25 February 1959:	Kapitän zur See (Captain at Sea)

== Notes ==
Military offices
Preceded by Korvettenkapitän Paul Büchel	Commander of the 21st U-boat Flotilla; June 1943 – September 1944	Succeeded by Kapitänleutnant Herwig Collmann
Preceded by — Wolfgang Lüth last commander during the Third Reich	Commander of the Naval Academy Mürwik; 2 May 1956 – 28 June 1956	Succeeded by Kapitän zur See Hubert Freiherr von Wangenheim
Preceded by Fregattenkapitän Josef Zacher	Commander of the Marinestützpunktkommando Flensburg-Mürwik; November 1959 – May 1960	Succeeded by Kapitän zur See Bernhardt Biederbick
Preceded by Kapitän zur See Gerd Schreiber	Commander of the Marinestützpunktkommando Kiel; April 1964 – March 1965	Succeeded by Fregattenkapitän Ernst Bauer
