= German submarine U-1274 =

German World War II submarine

- U-995 Type VIIC/41 at the Laboe Naval Memorial. This U-boat is almost identical to U-1274.

History

Nazi Germany
- Name: U-1274
- Ordered: 13 June 1942
- Builder: Vegesacker Werft AG, Bremen
- Yard number: 69
- Laid down: 21 June 1943
- Launched: 25 January 1944
- Commissioned: 1 March 1944
- Fate: Depth charged and sunk by HMS Viceroy on 16 April 1945

General characteristics
- Class & type: Type VIIC/41 submarine
- Displacement: 759 tonnes (747 long tons) surfaced; 860 t (846 long tons) submerged
- Length: 67.23 m (220 ft 7 in) o/a; 50.50 m (165 ft 8 in) pressure hull
- Beam: 6.20 m (20 ft 4 in) o/a; 4.70 m (15 ft 5 in) pressure hull
- Height: 9.60 m (31 ft 6 in)
- Draught: 4.74 m (15 ft 7 in)
- Installed power: 2,800–3,200 PS (2,100–2,400 kW; 2,800–3,200 bhp) (diesels); 750 PS (550 kW; 740 shp) (electric)
- Propulsion: 2 shafts; 2 × diesel engines; 2 × electric motors
- Speed: 17.7 knots (32.8 km/h; 20.4 mph) surfaced; 7.6 knots (14.1 km/h; 8.7 mph) submerged
- Range: 8,500 nmi (15,700 km; 9,800 mi) at 10 knots (19 km/h; 12 mph) surfaced; 80 nmi (150 km; 92 mi) at 4 knots (7.4 km/h; 4.6 mph) submerged
- Test depth: 230 m (750 ft); Calculated crush depth: 250–295 m (820–968 ft)
- Complement: 44-52 officers & ratings
- Armament: 5 × 53.3 cm (21 in) torpedo tubes (4 bow, 1 stern); 14 torpedoes; 1 × 8.8 cm (3.46 in) deck gun (220 rounds); 1 × 3.7 cm (1.5 in) Flak M42 AA gun; 2 × 2 cm (0.79 in) C/30 AA guns

Service record
- Part of: 8th U-boat Flotilla; 1 March 1944 – 1 March 1945; 5th U-boat Flotilla; 1 March – 16 April 1945
- Identification codes: M 50 816
- Commanders: Oblt.z.S. Fedor Kuscher; 1 March – July 1944; Oblt.z.S. Hans-Hermann Fitting; July 1944 – 16 April 1945
- Operations: 1 patrol: 1 – 16 April 1945
- Victories: 1 merchant ship sunk (8,966 GRT)

German submarine U-1274 was a Type VIIC/41 U-boat built for Nazi Germany's Kriegsmarine for service during World War II. She was ordered on 13 June 1942, and was laid down on 21 June 1943 by Vegesacker Werft AG, Bremen as yard number 69, launched on 25 January 1944 and commissioned on 1 March 1944 under Oberleutnant zur See Fedor Kuscher.

== Design ==
German Type VIIC/41 submarines were preceded by the heavier Type VIIC submarines. U-1274 had a displacement of 759 tonnes (747 long tons) when at the surface and 860 tonnes (850 long tons) while submerged. She had a total length of 67.10 m (220 ft 2 in), a pressure hull length of 50.50 m (165 ft 8 in), a beam of 6.20 m (20 ft 4 in), a height of 9.60 m (31 ft 6 in), and a draught of 4.74 m (15 ft 7 in). The submarine was powered by two Germaniawerft F46 four-stroke, six-cylinder supercharged diesel engines producing a total of 2,800 to 3,200 metric horsepower (2,060 to 2,350 kW; 2,760 to 3,160 shp) for use while surfaced, two AEG GU 460/8–27 double-acting electric motors producing a total of 750 metric horsepower (550 kW; 740 shp) for use while submerged. She had two shafts and two 1.23 m (4 ft) propellers. The boat was capable of operating at depths of up to 230 metres (750 ft).

The submarine had a maximum surface speed of 17.7 knots (32.8 km/h; 20.4 mph) and a maximum submerged speed of 7.6 knots (14.1 km/h; 8.7 mph). When submerged, the boat could operate for 80 nautical miles (150 km; 92 mi) at 4 knots (7.4 km/h; 4.6 mph); when surfaced, she could travel 8,500 nautical miles (15,700 km; 9,800 mi) at 10 knots (19 km/h; 12 mph). U-1274 was fitted with five 53.3 cm (21 in) torpedo tubes (four fitted at the bow and one at the stern), fourteen torpedoes, one 8.8 cm (3.46 in) SK C/35 naval gun, (220 rounds), one 3.7 cm (1.5 in) Flak M42 and two 2 cm (0.79 in) C/30 anti-aircraft guns. The boat had a complement of between forty-four and sixty.

== Emblem ==
U-1274's emblem was an oak leaf, with an anchor, and a dagger. She also shared this emblem with U-3, U-29, U-747, U-120 and U-1308.

== Service history ==
The boat's service career began on 1 March 1944 with the 8th Training Flotilla, followed by active service with 5th Flotilla on 1 March 1945. U-1274 took part in no wolfpacks. U-1274 was sunk on 16 April 1945 in the North Sea by depth charges from British destroyer HMS Viceroy, commanded by Lieutenant-Commander John Manners, at 55°36′N 01°24′W.

== Summary of raiding history ==
Date	Ship Name	Nationality	Tonnage (GRT)	Fate
16 April 1945	Athelduke	United Kingdom	8,966	Sunk

== See also ==
- Battle of the Atlantic

== Bibliography ==
- Busch, Rainer; Röll, Hans-Joachim (1999). German U-boat commanders of World War II : a biographical dictionary. Translated by Brooks, Geoffrey. London, Annapolis, Md: Greenhill Books, Naval Institute Press. ISBN 1-55750-186-6.
- Gröner, Erich; Jung, Dieter; Maass, Martin (1991). U-boats and Mine Warfare Vessels. German Warships 1815–1945. Vol. 2. Translated by Thomas, Keith; Magowan, Rachel. London: Conway Maritime Press. ISBN 0-85177-593-4.
