= SM U-118 =

German submarine

Coordinates: 50°51′15.21″N 0°35′8.74″E

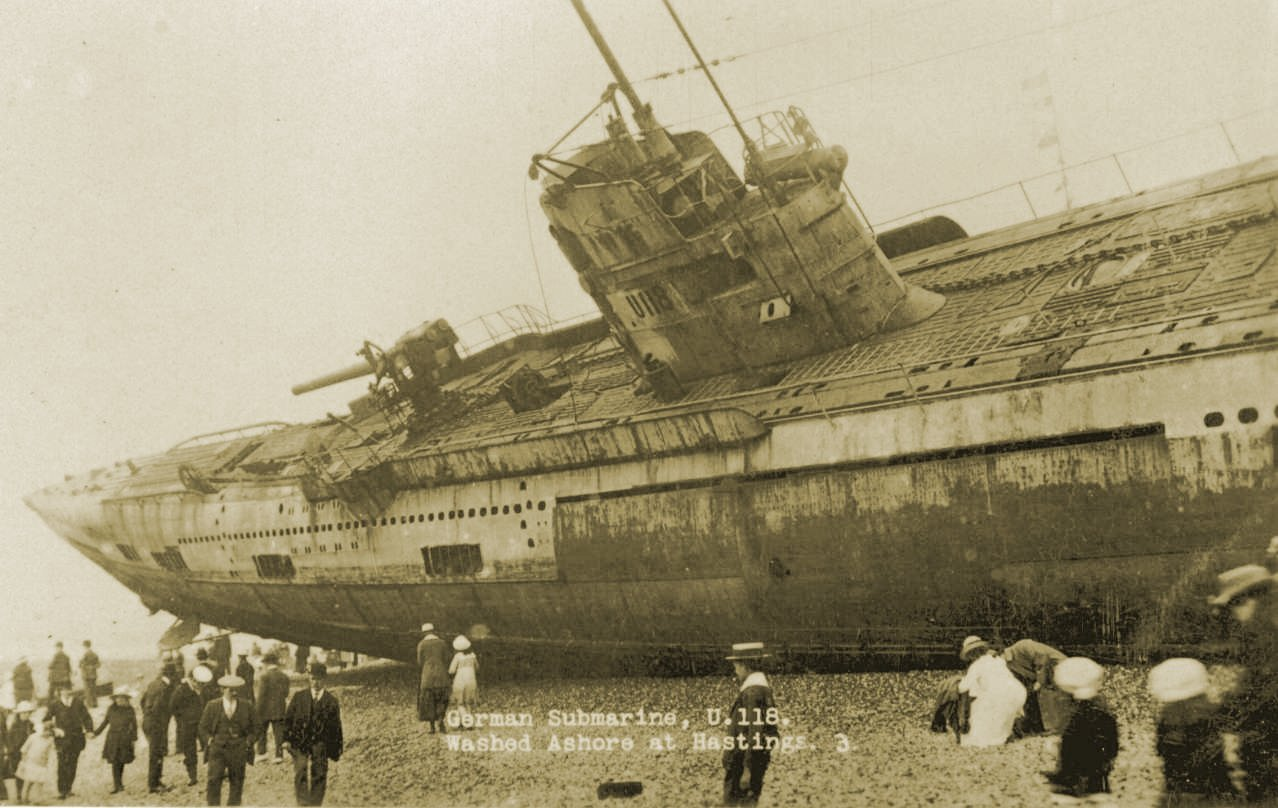
- SM U-118 washed ashore at Hastings, Sussex.

History

German Empire
- Name: U-118
- Ordered: 27 May 1916
- Builder: AG Vulcan Stettin
- Yard number: 92
- Launched: 23 February 1918
- Commissioned: 8 May 1918
- Home port: Hamburg
- Fate: Surrendered on 23 February 1919. Tow cable snapped during her voyage to France and she went aground on Hastings Beach on 15 April 1919. She was later broken up.

General characteristics
- Class & type: Type UE II submarine
- Type: Coastal minelaying submarine
- Displacement: 1,164 t (1,146 long tons) surfaced; 1,512 t (1,488 long tons) submerged
- Length: 81.52 m (267 ft 5 in) (o/a)
- Beam: 7.42 m (24 ft 4 in)
- Height: 10.16 m (33 ft 4 in)
- Draught: 4.22 m (13 ft 10 in)
- Installed power: 2 × diesel engines, 2,400 PS (1,765 kW; 2,367 shp); 2 × electric motors, 1,200 PS (883 kW; 1,184 shp)
- Propulsion: 2 shafts, 2 × 1.61 m (5 ft 3 in) propellers
- Speed: 14.7 knots (27.2 km/h; 16.9 mph) surfaced; 7 knots (13 km/h; 8.1 mph) submerged
- Range: 13,900 nmi (25,700 km; 16,000 mi) at 8 knots (15 km/h; 9.2 mph) surfaced; 35 nmi (65 km; 40 mi) at 4.5 knots (8.3 km/h; 5.2 mph) submerged
- Test depth: 75 m (246 ft)
- Complement: 4 officers, 36 enlisted
- Armament: 4 × 50 cm (19.7 in) bow torpedo tubes; 14 torpedoes; 2 × 100 cm (39 in) stern mine chutes; 42 mines; 1 × 15 cm (5.9 in) SK L/45 deck gun; 494 rounds

Service record
- Part of: I Flotilla; Unknown start – 11 November 1918
- Commanders: Kptlt. Herbert Stohwasser; 8 May 1918 – 11 November 1918
- Operations: 1 patrol
- Victories: 2 merchant ships sunk (10,439 GRT)

SM U-118 (Note: "SM" stands for "Seiner Majestät" (English: His Majesty's) and combined with the U for Unterseeboot would be translated as His Majesty's Submarine.) was a type UE II mine-laying submarine of the Imperial German Navy and one of 329 submarines serving with that navy during World War I.

U-118 engaged in naval warfare and took part in the First Battle of the Atlantic.

== Career ==
SM U-118 was commissioned on 8 May 1918, following her construction at the AG Vulcan Stettin shipyard in Hamburg. She was commanded by Herbert Stohwasser and joined the I Flotilla operating in the eastern Atlantic. After four months without sinking any ships, on 16 September 1918, the U-118 scored her first hit. Some 175 miles (282 km) north-west of Cape Villano, the U-118 torpedoed and sank the British steamer Wellington. The following month, on 2 October 1918, she sank her second and last ship, the British tanker Arca at about 40 miles (64 km) north-west of Tory Island. The ending of hostilities on 11 November 1918 led to the subsequent surrender of the Imperial German Navy. U-118 was surrendered to the Allies at Harwich on 23 February 1919.

== Beaching at Hastings ==
U-118 was to be transferred to France, but while in tow from Harwich to Brest, in company with SM UB-121, in the early hours of 15 April 1919, she broke tow in a storm, and ran aground on the beach at Hastings in Sussex at approximately 00:45, directly in front of the Queens Hotel.

Initially, there were attempts to displace the stricken vessel. Three tractors tried to refloat the submarine, and a French destroyer attempted to break the boat apart using her guns. All were unsuccessful, and the closeness of the submarine to the public beach and the Queens Hotel prevented the use of explosives.

The stranded submarine became a popular tourist attraction, and thousands visited Hastings that Easter to see her. She was under the authority of the local coast guard station, and the Admiralty allowed the town clerk of Hastings to charge a small fee for visitors to climb on the deck. This went on for two weeks, during which the town gained almost £300 (UK£ 14,700 in 2025) to help fund a welcome for the town's soldiers returning from the war.

Two members of the coast guard, chief boatman William Heard and chief officer W. Moore, showed important visitors around the interior of the submarine. The visits were curtailed in late April, when both coast guard men became severely ill. Rotting food on board was thought to be the cause, but the men's condition persisted and got worse. Moore died in December 1919, followed by Heard in February 1920. An inquest decided that a noxious gas, possibly chlorine released from the submarine's damaged batteries, had caused abscesses on the men's lungs and brain.

Although visits inside the submarine had stopped, tourists still came to be photographed alongside or on the U-boat's deck. The wreck was sold by the British Admiralty to James Dredging Co. on 21 May 1919 for £2,200 (£ 98,000 in 2025) and broken up on the beach until 1921. The deck gun was left behind, but was removed in 1921. Some of the ship's keel may yet remain buried in the beach sand.

== Summary of raiding history ==
Date	Name	Nationality	Tonnage (Note: Tonnages are in gross register tons)	Fate
16 September 1918	Wellington	United Kingdom	5,600	Sunk 5 crew members lost
2 October 1918	Arca	United Kingdom	4,839	Sunk 52 crew members lost

== Gallery ==
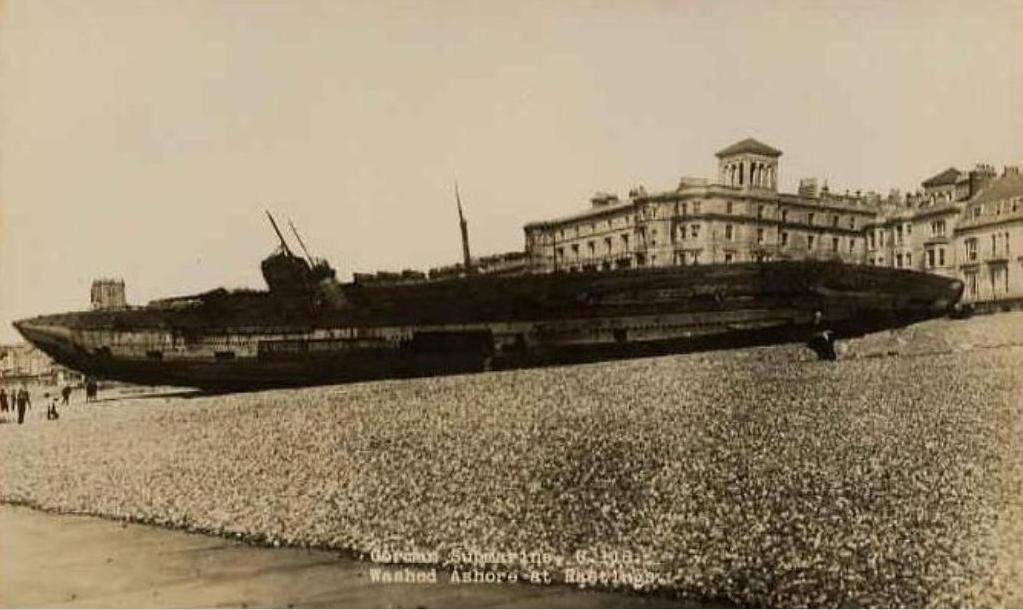
A postcard showing SM U-118 washed ashore.

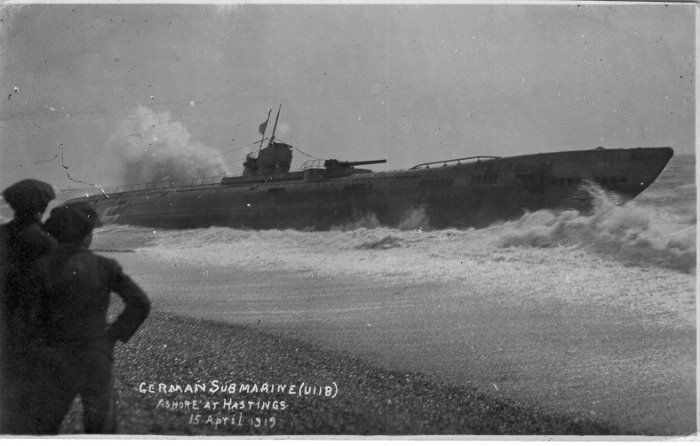
SM U-118 shortly after being beached at Hastings.

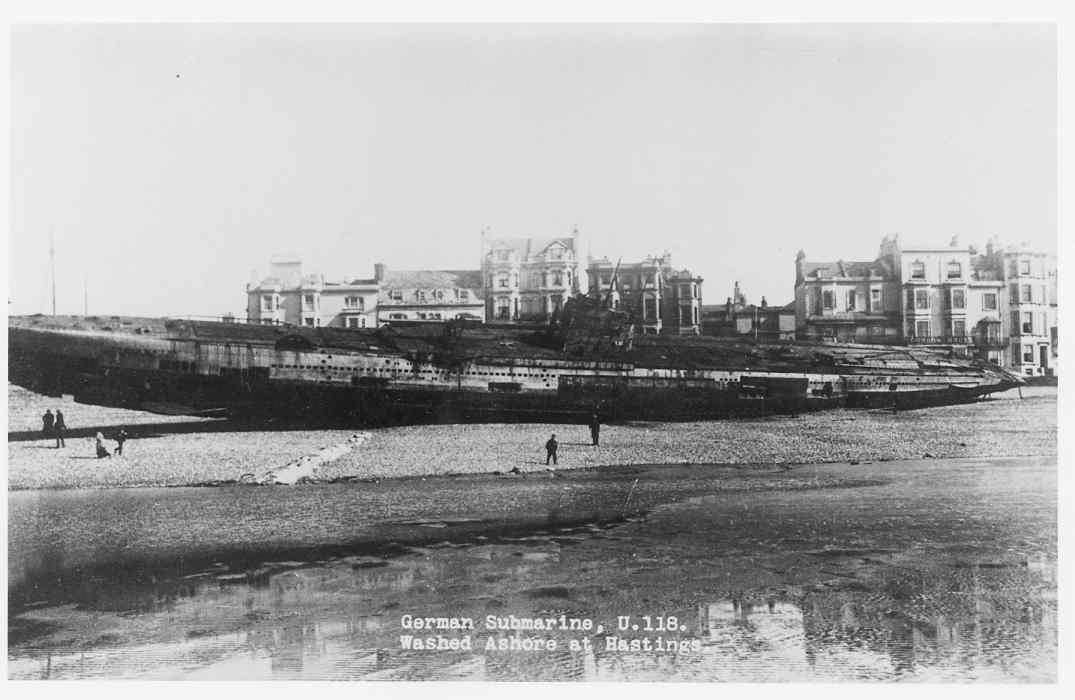
Ground view of SM U-118 in front of the Queen's hotel.

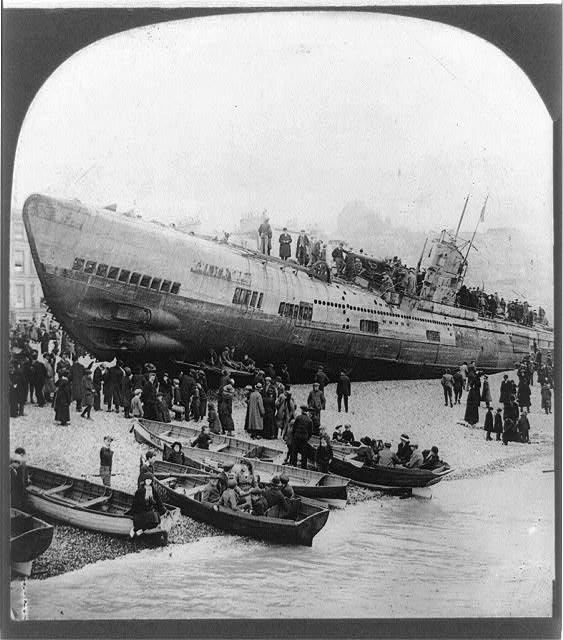
SM U-118 crowded with tourists.

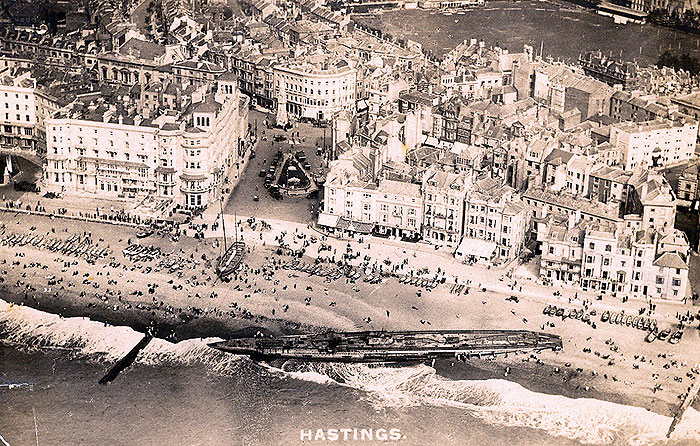
Aerial view of SM U-118 in front of the Queen's hotel.

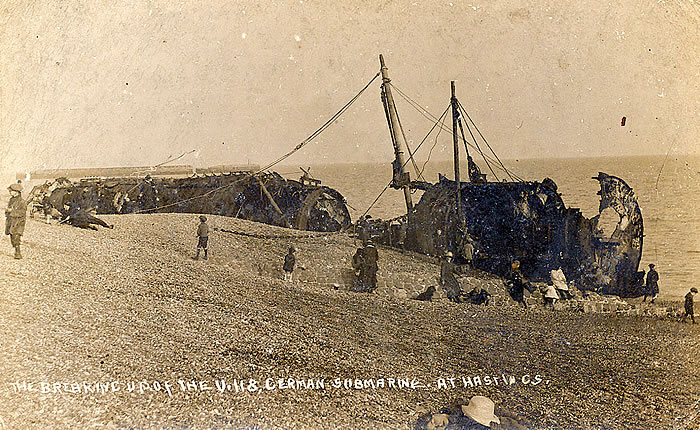
SM U-118 being dismantled.

== Bibliography ==
- Gröner, Erich; Jung, Dieter; Maass, Martin (1991). German Warships 1815–1945, U-boats and Mine Warfare Vessels. Vol. 2. Translated by Thomas, Keith; Magowan, Rachel. London: Conway Maritime Press. ISBN 0-85177-593-4.
