= German submarine U-29 (1936) =

German World War II submarine

Coordinates: 49°57′N 15°34′W

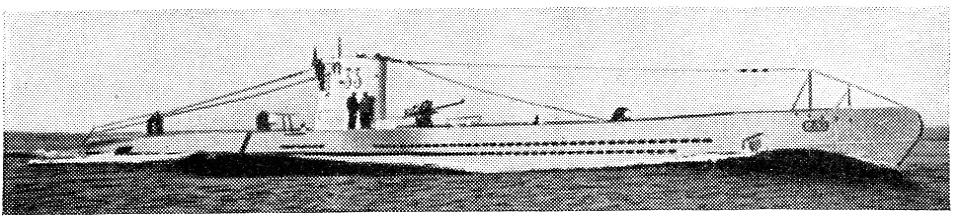
- U-33, a typical Type VIIA boat

History

Nazi Germany
- Name: U-29
- Ordered: 1 April 1935
- Builder: AG Weser, Bremen
- Cost: 4,189,000 Reichsmark
- Yard number: 910
- Laid down: 2 January 1936
- Launched: 29 August 1936
- Commissioned: 16 November 1936
- Decommissioned: 17 April 1944
- Fate: Scuttled in Kupfermühlen Bay on 5 May 1945
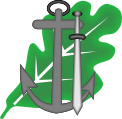
- Badge

General characteristics
- Class & type: Type VIIA submarine
- Displacement: 626 tonnes (616 long tons) surfaced; 745 t (733 long tons) submerged
- Length: 64.51 m (211 ft 8 in) o/a; 45.50 m (149 ft 3 in) pressure hull
- Beam: 5.85 m (19 ft 2 in) o/a; 4.70 m (15 ft 5 in) pressure hull
- Height: 9.50 m (31 ft 2 in)
- Draught: 4.37 m (14 ft 4 in)
- Installed power: 2,100–2,310 PS (1,540–1,700 kW; 2,070–2,280 bhp) (diesels); 750 PS (550 kW; 740 shp) (electric)
- Propulsion: 2 shafts; 2 × diesel engines; 2 × electric motors
- Speed: 17 knots (31 km/h; 20 mph) surfaced; 8 knots (15 km/h; 9.2 mph) submerged
- Range: 6,200 nmi (11,500 km; 7,100 mi) at 10 knots (19 km/h; 12 mph) surfaced; 73–94 nmi (135–174 km; 84–108 mi) at 4 knots (7.4 km/h; 4.6 mph) submerged
- Test depth: 220 m (720 ft); Crush depth: 230–250 m (750–820 ft)
- Complement: 4 officers, 40–56 enlisted
- Sensors & processing systems: Gruppenhorchgerät
- Armament: 5 × 53.3 cm (21 in) torpedo tubes (four bow, one stern); 11 × torpedoes or 26 TMA mines; 1 × 8.8 cm (3.46 in) deck gun (220 rounds); 1 × 2 cm (0.79 in) C/30 anti-aircraft gun

Service record
- Part of: 2nd U-boat Flotilla; 16 November 1936 – 1 January 1941; 24th U-boat Flotilla; 2 January 1941 – 30 June 1942; 1 November 1942 – 31 August 1943; 23rd U-boat Flotilla; 1 September – 30 November 1943; 21st U-boat Flotilla; 1 December 1943 – 17 April 1944
- Identification codes: M 10 220
- Commanders: Kptlt. Heinz Fischer; 16 November 1936 – 31 October 1938; Oblt.z.S. Georg-Heinz Michel; 1 November 1938 – 3 April 1939; Kptlt. Otto Schuhart; 4 April 1939 – 2 January 1941; Oblt.z.S. Georg Lassen; 3 January – 14 September 1941; Oblt.z.S. Heinrich Hasenschar; 15 September 1941 – 5 May 1942; Oblt.z.S. Karl-Heinz Marbach; 6 May – 30 June 1942; Oblt.z.S. Rudolf Zorn; 15 November 1942 – 20 August 1943; Lt.z.S. / Oblt.z.S. Eduard Aust; 21 August – 2 November 1943; Oblt.z.S. Ulrich-Philipp Graf von und zu Arco-Zinneberg; 3 November 1943 – 17 April 1944
- Operations: 7 patrols: 1st patrol: 19 August – 26 September 1939; 2nd patrol: 14 November – 16 December 1939; 3rd patrol: a. 6 – 7 February 1940; b. 11 February – 12 March 1940; c. 17 – 23 April 1940; 4th patrol: 27 April – 4 May 1940; 5th patrol: a. 27 May – 11 July 1940; b. 2 – 5 September 1940; 6th patrol: 11 September – 1 October 1940; 7th patrol: 26 October – 3 December 1940
- Victories: 12 merchant ships sunk (67,277 GRT); 1 warship sunk (22,500 tons)

German submarine U-29 was a Type VIIA U-boat of Nazi Germany's Kriegsmarine during World War II.

She was laid down on 2 January 1936, launched on 29 August and commissioned on 10 November. During her career U-29 was involved in seven war patrols under the command of Kapitänleutnant Otto Schuhart.

== Design ==
As one of the first ten German Type VII submarines later designated as Type VIIA submarines, U-29 had a displacement of 626 tonnes (616 long tons) when at the surface and 745 tonnes (733 long tons) while submerged. She had a total length of 64.51 m (211 ft 8 in), a pressure hull length of 45.50 m (149 ft 3 in), a beam of 5.85 m (19 ft 2 in), a height of 9.50 m (31 ft 2 in), and a draught of 4.37 m (14 ft 4 in). The submarine was powered by two MAN M 6 V 40/46 four-stroke, six-cylinder diesel engines producing a total of 2,100 to 2,310 metric horsepower (1,540 to 1,700 kW; 2,070 to 2,280 shp) for use while surfaced, two BBC GG UB 720/8 double-acting electric motors producing a total of 750 metric horsepower (550 kW; 740 shp) for use while submerged. She had two shafts and two 1.23 m (4 ft) propellers. The boat was capable of operating at depths of up to 230 metres (750 ft).

The submarine had a maximum surface speed of 17 knots (31 km/h; 20 mph) and a maximum submerged speed of 8 knots (15 km/h; 9.2 mph). When submerged, the boat could operate for 73–94 nautical miles (135–174 km; 84–108 mi) at 4 knots (7.4 km/h; 4.6 mph); when surfaced, she could travel 6,200 nautical miles (11,500 km; 7,100 mi) at 10 knots (19 km/h; 12 mph). U-29 was fitted with five 53.3 cm (21 in) torpedo tubes (four fitted at the bow and one at the stern), eleven torpedoes, one 8.8 cm (3.46 in) SK C/35 naval gun, 220 rounds, and an anti-aircraft gun. The boat had a complement of between forty-four and sixty.

== Service history ==
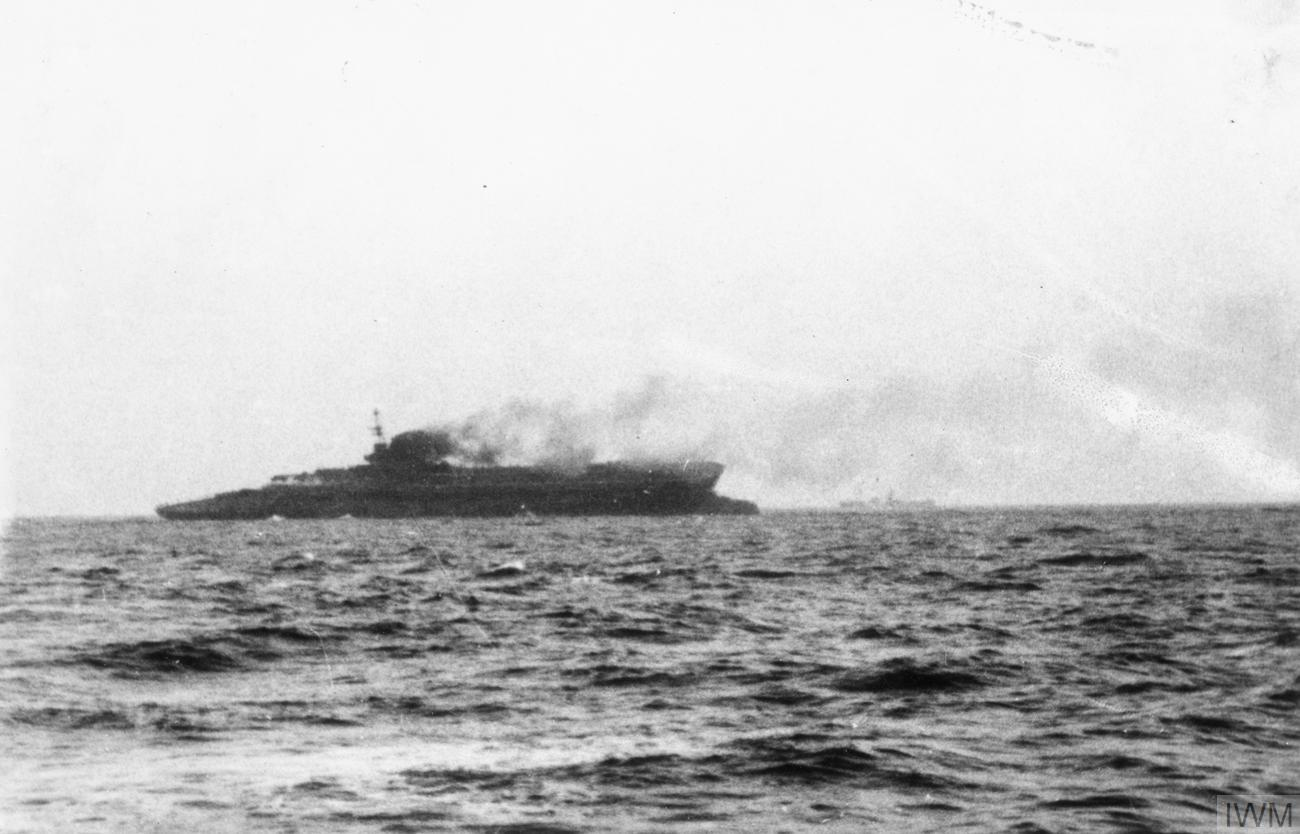
HMS Courageous sinking after being torpedoed by U-29

U-29 was responsible for sinking the aircraft carrier HMS Courageous, on 17 September 1939, the first British warship sunk in the war by enemy action. The commander of the German submarine force, Commodore Karl Dönitz, regarded the sinking of Courageous as "a wonderful success" and Grand Admiral Erich Raeder, commander of the Kriegsmarine (German navy) directed that Schuhart be awarded the Iron Cross First Class and that all other members of the U-29 crew receive the Iron Cross Second Class.

During U-29's career, she sank twelve ships, totaling 67,277 gross register tons (GRT) and one warship of 22,500 tons. At the beginning of 1941, U-29 was removed from front line duty and reassigned to the 24th U-boat Flotilla as a training submarine. The U-boat was used in this role until 17 April 1944 when she was decommissioned and used for instruction.

=== Fate ===
U-29 was scuttled in Kupfermühlen Bay, (east of Flensburg), on 5 May 1945 as part of Operation Regenbogen, to avoid her surrender, at the end of World War II. The wreck was still in situ as of 1993.

=== Wolfpacks ===
U-29 took part in one wolfpack, namely:

- Rösing (12 – 15 June 1940)

== Emblem ==
U-29's emblem was an oak leaf, with an anchor, and a knife or dagger. She also shared this emblem with U-3, U-120, U-747, U-1274 and U-1308.

== Summary of raiding history ==
Date	Name of Ship	Nationality	Tonnage (Note: Merchant ship tonnages are in gross register tons. Military vessels are listed by tons displacement.)	Fate
8 September 1939	Regent Tiger	United Kingdom	10,176	Sunk
13 September 1939	Neptunia	United Kingdom	798	Sunk
14 September 1939	British Influence	United Kingdom	8,431	Sunk
17 September 1939	HMS Courageous	Royal Navy	22,500	Sunk
3 March 1940	Cato	United Kingdom	710	Sunk (mine)
4 March 1940	Pacific Reliance	United Kingdom	6,717	Sunk
4 March 1940	Thurston	United Kingdom	3,072	Sunk
16 March 1940	Slava	Yugoslavia	4,512	Sunk (mine)
26 June 1940	Dimitris	Greece	5,254	Sunk
1 July 1940	Adamastos	Greece	7,466	Sunk
2 July 1940	Athellaird	United Kingdom	8,999	Sunk
2 July 1940	Santa Margarita	Panama	4,919	Sunk
25 September 1940	Eurymedon	United Kingdom	6,223	Sunk

== Bibliography ==
- Busch, Rainer; Röll, Hans-Joachim (1999). German U-boat commanders of World War II : a biographical dictionary. Translated by Brooks, Geoffrey. London, Annapolis, Md: Greenhill Books, Naval Institute Press. ISBN 1-55750-186-6.
- Gröner, Erich; Jung, Dieter; Maass, Martin (1991). U-boats and Mine Warfare Vessels. German Warships 1815–1945. Vol. 2. Translated by Thomas, Keith; Magowan, Rachel. London: Conway Maritime Press. ISBN 0-85177-593-4.
- Neistlé, Axel (2014). German U-Boat Losses during World War II: Details of Destruction (2nd ed.). Havertown: Frontline Books.
