= SM U-125 =

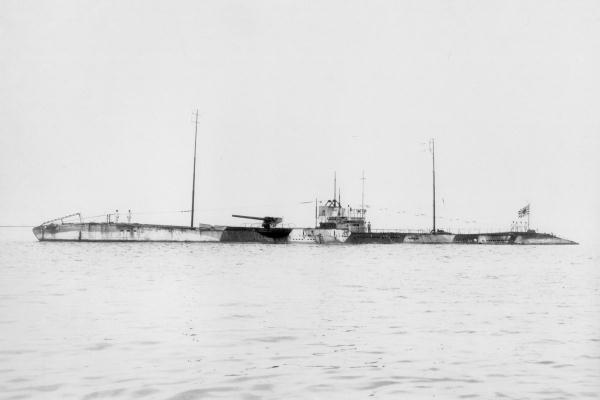
- U-125 As O-1 in 1919

History

German Empire
- Name: U-125
- Ordered: 27 May 1916
- Builder: Blohm & Voss, Hamburg
- Yard number: 302
- Launched: 26 May 1918
- Commissioned: 4 September 1918
- Fate: Surrendered to Japan 26 November 1918, left service in 1935

General characteristics
- Class & type: Type UE II submarine
- Type: Coastal minelaying submarine
- Displacement: 1,163 t (1,145 long tons) surfaced; 1,468 t (1,445 long tons) submerged
- Length: 82.00 m (269 ft) (o/a); 61.32 m (201 ft 2 in) (pressure hull)
- Beam: 7.42 m (24 ft 4 in)
- Height: 10.16 m (33 ft 4 in)
- Draught: 4.22 m (13 ft 10 in)
- Installed power: 2 × diesel engines, 2,400 PS (1,765 kW; 2,367 shp); 2 × electric motors, 1,235 PS (908 kW; 1,218 shp)
- Propulsion: 2 shafts, 2 × 1.61 m (5 ft 3 in) propellers
- Speed: 14.7 knots (27.2 km/h; 16.9 mph) surfaced; 7.2 knots (13.3 km/h; 8.3 mph) submerged
- Range: 11,470 nmi (21,240 km; 13,200 mi) at 8 knots (15 km/h; 9.2 mph) surfaced; 35 nmi (65 km; 40 mi) at 4.5 knots (8.3 km/h; 5.2 mph) submerged
- Test depth: 75 m (246 ft)
- Complement: 4 officers, 36 enlisted
- Armament: 4 × 50 cm (19.7 in) bow torpedo tubes; 12 torpedoes; 2 × 100 cm (39 in) stern mine chutes; 42 mines; 1 × 15 cm (5.9 in) SK L/45 deck gun; 494 rounds

Service record
- Commanders: Kptlt. Hans Scabell; 4 September – 11 November 1918
- Operations: None
- Victories: None

SM U-125 (Note: "SM" stands for "Seiner Majestät" (English: His Majesty's) and combined with the U for Unterseeboot would be translated as His Majesty's Submarine.) was one of the 329 submarines serving in the Imperial German Navy in World War I. U-125 was engaged in the naval warfare and took part in the First Battle of the Atlantic.

== Design ==
Type UE II submarines were preceded by the shorter Type UE I submarines. U-125 had a displacement of 1,163 tonnes (1,145 long tons) when at the surface and 1,468 tonnes (1,445 long tons) while submerged. She had a total length of 82 metres (269 ft), a beam of 7.42 m (24 ft 4 in), a height of 10.16 m (33 ft 4 in), and a draught of 4.22 m (13 ft 10 in). The submarine was powered by two 2,400 metric horsepower (1,800 kW; 2,400 shp) engines for use while surfaced, and two 1,235 metric horsepower (908 kW; 1,218 shp) engines for use while submerged. She had two shafts and two 1.61 m (5.3 ft) propellers. She was capable of operating at depths of up to 75 metres (246 ft).

The submarine had a maximum surface speed of 14.7 knots (27.2 km/h; 16.9 mph) and a maximum submerged speed of 7.2 knots (13.3 km/h; 8.3 mph). When submerged, she could operate for 35 nautical miles (65 km; 40 mi) at 4.5 knots (8.3 km/h; 5.2 mph); when surfaced, she could travel 11,470 nautical miles (21,240 km; 13,200 mi) at 8 knots (15 km/h; 9.2 mph). U-125 was fitted with four 50 centimetres (20 in) torpedo tubes (fitted at its bow), twelve torpedoes, two 100 centimetres (39 in) mine chutes (fitted at its stern), forty-two mines, one 15 cm (5.9 in) SK L/45 deck gun, and 494 rounds. She had a complement of forty (thirty-six crew members and four officers).

== Service ==
=== Post-war ===
U-125 was surrendered to Japan on 26 November 1918 and was renamed O-1 in 1920 or 1921. She was dismantled at the Yokosuka Naval Arsenal between January and March 1921. Between March 1924 and January 1925, she was used as a floating jetty at the Kure KSubmarine School. In 1925, she was rebuilt at Yokosuka as testbed for submarine salvage operations carried out by the submarine tender Asahi. On 19 August 1931, the formerO-1 was recommissioned as Auxiliary Vessel No. 2900 and used as such until 1935.

== Bibliography ==
- Gröner, Erich; Jung, Dieter; Maass, Martin (1991). U-boats and Mine Warfare Vessels. German Warships 1815–1945. Vol. 2. Translated by Thomas, Keith; Magowan, Rachel. London: Conway Maritime Press. ISBN 0-85177-593-4.
