= Georg Lassen =

German U-boat commander

- Born: 12 May 1915; Berlin-Steglitz, German Empire
- Died: 18 January 2012 (aged 96); Mallorca, Spain
- Military career
- Allegiance: Nazi Germany
- Branch: Kriegsmarine
- Rank: Korvettenkapitän
- Commands: U-29; U-160; 1. U-Boot-Lehrdivision
- Conflicts: Battle of the Atlantic
- Awards: Knight's Cross of the Iron Cross with Oak Leaves

Georg Lassen (12 May 1915 – 18 January 2012) was a German U-boat commander during World War II. He was a Watch Officer on U-29 at the outbreak of the war and later the skipper of the U-160 and recipient of the Knight’s Cross.

Whist aboard the U-29 under the command of Kapitänleutnant Otto Schuhart the crew sunk a total of 12 ships, including the British aircraft carrier HMS Courageous. Lassen became commander of U-29 on 3 January 1941 when Otto Schuhart was reassigned as a training instructor. The U-29 was under Lassen's command until from 3 January 1941 to 14 September 1941 during which the submarine was a training boat attached to the 24th (Training) Flotilla.

After his stint aboard the U-29, he was assigned command of U-160. On his first patrol with the crew of U-160 they sank and damaged a total of 6 vessels during the time between March and April 1942. A year later aboard U-160 during a patrol in South African waters Lassen and his crew sank and/or damaged 6 ships in under 5 hours. Lassen received the Oak Leaves for his Iron Cross for his success during the South African patrol.

In June 1943, Lassen was reassigned as a tactics instructor with the 1. U-Boot Lehrdivision, the same training division his former commander Otto Schuhart was reassigned to earlier.

Lassen became a businessman after the war and later worked as a managing director for a large company. In a traffic accident he lost an arm. His wife died after 55 years of marriage. In old age he moved to a retirement home in Mallorca, where he died on 18 January 2012 at the age of 96.

== Awards ==
- Wehrmacht Long Service Award 4th Class (5 April 1939)
- Iron Cross (1939) 2nd Class (26 September 1939) & 1st Class (18 July 1940)
- Memel Medal (26 October 1939)
- U-boat War Badge (1939) (18 July 1940)
- U-boat Front Clasp (22 October 1944)
- Knight's Cross of the Iron Cross with Oak Leaves
  - Knight's Cross on 10 August 1942 as Oberleutnant zur See and commander of U-160
  - Oak Leaves on 7 March 1943 as Kapitänleutnant and commander of U-160
