= SM U-123 =

Coordinates: 50°11′10″N 1°18′50″W

History

German Empire
- Name: U-123
- Ordered: 27 May 1916
- Builder: Blohm & Voss, Hamburg
- Yard number: 300
- Launched: 26 January 1918
- Commissioned: 20 July 1918
- Fate: Surrendered 22 November 1918; scuttled English Channel 28 June 1921.

General characteristics
- Class & type: Type UE II submarine
- Type: Coastal minelaying submarine
- Displacement: 1,163 t (1,145 long tons) surfaced; 1,468 t (1,445 long tons) submerged
- Length: 82.00 m (269 ft) (o/a); 61.32 m (201 ft 2 in) (pressure hull)
- Beam: 7.42 m (24 ft 4 in)
- Height: 10.16 m (33 ft 4 in)
- Draught: 4.22 m (13 ft 10 in)
- Installed power: 2 × diesel engines, 2,400 PS (1,765 kW; 2,367 shp); 2 × electric motors, 1,235 PS (908 kW; 1,218 shp)
- Propulsion: 2 shafts, 2 × 1.61 m (5 ft 3 in) propellers
- Speed: 14.7 knots (27.2 km/h; 16.9 mph) surfaced; 7.2 knots (13.3 km/h; 8.3 mph) submerged
- Range: 11,470 nmi (21,240 km; 13,200 mi) at 8 knots (15 km/h; 9.2 mph) surfaced; 35 nmi (65 km; 40 mi) at 4.5 knots (8.3 km/h; 5.2 mph) submerged
- Test depth: 75 m (246 ft)
- Complement: 4 officers, 36 enlisted
- Armament: 4 × 50 cm (19.7 in) bow torpedo tubes; 12 torpedoes; 2 × 100 cm (39 in) stern mine chutes; 42 mines; 2 × 10.5 cm (4.1 in) SK L/45 deck guns; 600 rounds

Service record
- Commanders: Oblt.z.S. Karl Thouret; 20 July – 11 November 1918
- Operations: None
- Victories: None

SM U-123 (Note: "SM" stands for "Seiner Majestät" (English: His Majesty's) and combined with the U for Unterseeboot would be translated as His Majesty's Submarine.) was one of the 329 submarines serving in the Imperial German Navy in World War I. U-123 was engaged in the naval warfare and took part in the First Battle of the Atlantic.

U-123 was surrendered to the Allies at Harwich on 22 November 1918 in accordance with the requirements of the Armistice with Germany. Initially earmarked for experiments, she was laid up at Portsmouth until towed out into the middle of the English Channel and scuttled on 28 June 1921.

== Design ==
Type UE II submarines were preceded by the shorter Type UE I submarines. U-123 had a displacement of 1,163 tonnes (1,145 long tons) when at the surface and 1,468 tonnes (1,445 long tons) while submerged. She had a total length of 82 m (269 ft), a beam of 7.42 m (24 ft 4 in), a height of 10.16 m (33 ft 4 in), and a draught of 4.22 m (13 ft 10 in). The submarine was powered by two 2,400 metric horsepower (1,800 kW; 2,400 shp) engines for use while surfaced, and two 1,235 metric horsepower (908 kW; 1,218 shp) engines for use while submerged. She had two shafts and two 1.61 m (5.3 ft) propellers. She was capable of operating at depths of up to 75 metres (246 ft).

The submarine had a maximum surface speed of 14.7 knots (27.2 km/h; 16.9 mph) and a maximum submerged speed of 7.2 knots (13.3 km/h; 8.3 mph). When submerged, she could operate for 35 nautical miles (65 km; 40 mi) at 4.5 knots (8.3 km/h; 5.2 mph); when surfaced, she could travel 11,470 nautical miles (21,240 km; 13,200 mi) at 8 knots (15 km/h; 9.2 mph). U-123 was fitted with four 50 centimetres (20 in) torpedo tubes (fitted at the bow), twelve torpedoes, two 100 centimetres (39 in) mine chutes (fitted at the stern), forty-two mines, two 10.5 cm (4.1 in) SK L/45 deck guns, and 600 rounds. She had a complement of forty (thirty-six crew members and four officers).

== Bibliography ==
- Gröner, Erich; Jung, Dieter; Maass, Martin (1991). U-boats and Mine Warfare Vessels. German Warships 1815–1945. Vol. 2. Translated by Thomas, Keith; Magowan, Rachel. London: Conway Maritime Press. ISBN 0-85177-593-4.
