= Japanese battleship Asahi =

Battleship of the Imperial Japanese Navy

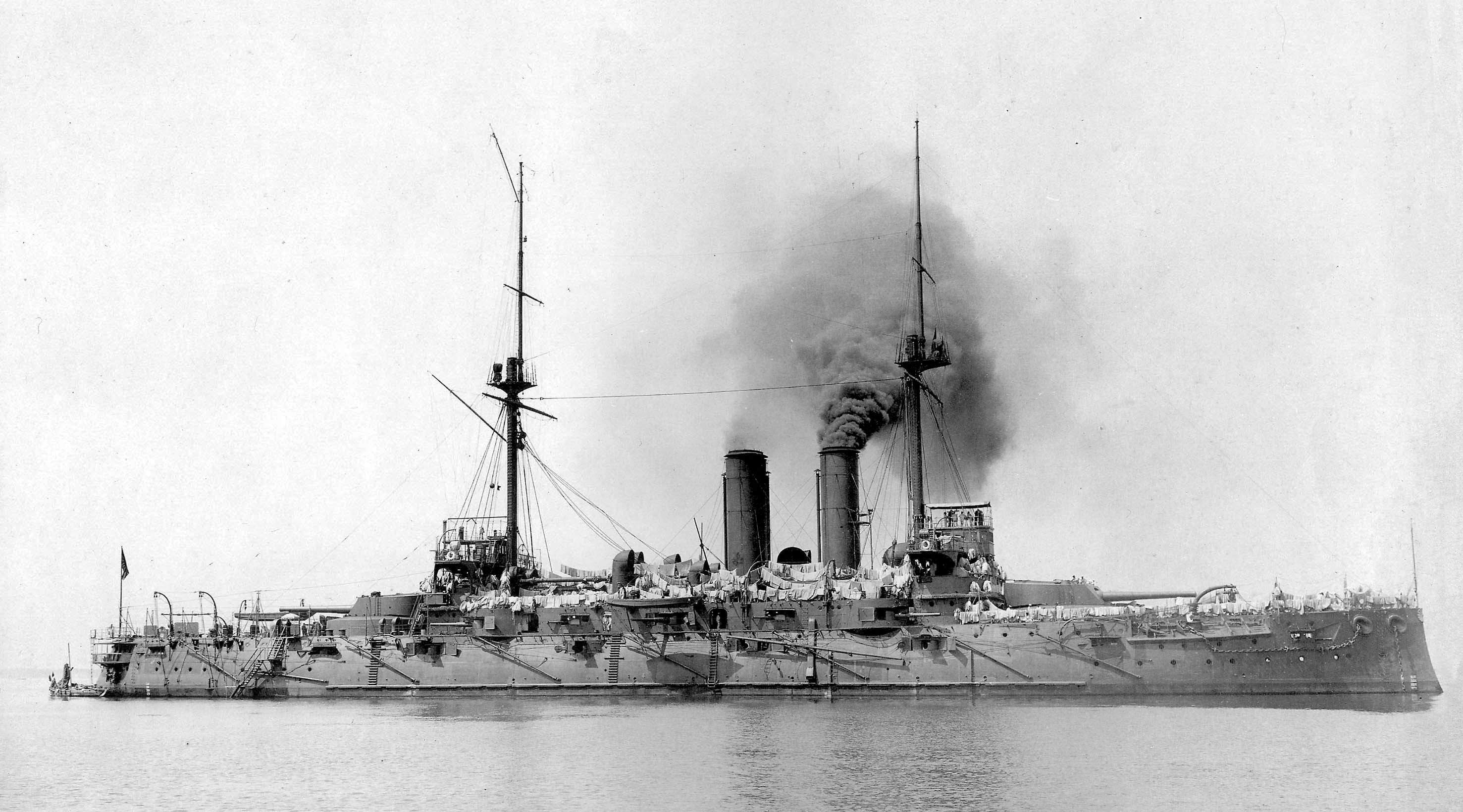
- Asahi at anchor about 1906

Class overview
- Operators: Imperial Japanese Navy
- Preceded by: Shikishima class
- Succeeded by: Mikasa
- Built: 1897–1900
- In commission: 1900–1942
- Completed: 1
- Lost: 1

History
- Name: Asahi
- Namesake: A stanza of waka
- Ordered: 1897 Naval Programme
- Builder: John Brown & Company, Clydebank
- Laid down: 1 August 1898
- Launched: 13 March 1899
- Commissioned: 28 April 1900
- Reclassified: As 1st-class coastal defence ship, September 1921; as submarine depot ship, 1 April 1923; as repair ship, 16 August 1937
- Stricken: 15 June 1942
- Fate: Torpedoed and sunk, 25/26 May 1942

General characteristics (as built)
- Type: Pre-dreadnought battleship
- Displacement: 15,200 long tons (15,400 t) (normal)
- Length: 425 ft 3 in (129.6 m)
- Beam: 75 ft (22.9 m)
- Draught: 27 ft 3 in (8.3 m)
- Installed power: 25 Belleville boilers; 15,000 ihp (11,000 kW)
- Propulsion: 2 shafts, 2 triple-expansion steam engines
- Speed: 18 knots (33 km/h; 21 mph)
- Range: 9,000 nmi (17,000 km; 10,000 mi) at 10 knots (19 km/h; 12 mph)
- Complement: 773
- Armament: 2 × twin 12 in (305 mm) guns; 14 × single 6 in (152 mm) QF guns; 20 × single 12-pdr (3 in (76 mm)) guns; 6 × single 3-pdr (1.9 in (47 mm)) guns; 6 × single 2.5-pdr (1.9 in (47 mm)) Hotchkiss guns; 4 × 18 in (450 mm) torpedo tubes
- Armour: Harvey armour; Belt: 4–9 in (102–229 mm); Deck: 2.5–4 in (64–102 mm); Gun turrets: 6 in (152 mm); Barbettes: 10–14 in (254–356 mm); Conning tower: 14 in (356 mm); Casemates: 2–6 in (51–152 mm)

Asahi (朝日, Morning Sun) was a pre-dreadnought battleship built for the Imperial Japanese Navy (IJN) in the late 1890s. As Japan lacked the industrial capacity to build such warships itself, the ship was designed and built in the United Kingdom. Shortly after her arrival in Japan, she became flagship of the Standing Fleet, the IJN's primary combat fleet. She participated in every major naval battle of the Russo-Japanese War of 1904–1905 and was lightly damaged during the Battle of the Yellow Sea and the Battle of Tsushima. Asahi saw no combat during World War I, although the ship participated in the Siberian Intervention in 1918.

Reclassified as a coastal defence ship in 1921, Asahi was disarmed two years later to meet the terms of the Washington Naval Treaty, after which she served as a training and submarine depot ship. She was modified into a submarine salvage and rescue ship before being placed in reserve in 1928. Asahi was recommissioned in late 1937, after the start of the Second Sino-Japanese War, and used to transport Japanese troops. In 1938, she was converted into a repair ship and based first at Japanese-occupied Shanghai, China, and then Cam Ranh Bay, French Indochina, from late 1938 to 1941. The ship was transferred to occupied Singapore in early 1942 to repair a damaged light cruiser and ordered to return home in May. She was sunk en route by the American submarine USS Salmon, although most of her crew survived.

== Background ==
Combat experience in the First Sino-Japanese War of 1894–95 convinced the Imperial Japanese Navy of weaknesses in the Jeune École naval philosophy, which emphasized torpedo boats and commerce raiding to offset expensive heavily armoured ships. Therefore, Japan promulgated a ten-year naval build-up in early 1896, to modernize and expand its fleet in preparation for further confrontations, with the construction of six battleships and six armoured cruisers at its core. These ships were paid for from the £30,000,000 indemnity paid by China after losing the First Sino-Japanese War. As with the earlier Fuji and Shikishima classes, Japan lacked the technology and capability to construct its own battleships, and turned again to the United Kingdom for the four remaining battleships of the programme. Asahi, the fifth Japanese battleship to be built in Britain, was ordered from the Clydebank Engineering & Shipbuilding Company shipyard in Clydebank, Scotland in the 1897 annual naval programme.

== Design and description ==
=== General characteristics ===
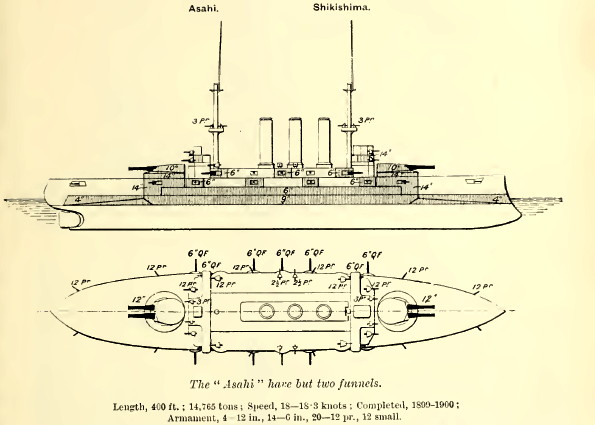
Right elevation and plan of the Shikishima-class battleships and the battleship Asahi from Brassey's Naval Annual 1915. Unlike the drawing, Asahi had only two funnels.

Asahi's design was a modified version of the Formidable-class battleships of the Royal Navy, with two additional 6-inch (152 mm) guns. The ship had an overall length of 425 feet 3 inches (129.6 m), a beam of 75 feet (22.9 m), and a normal draught of 27 feet 3 inches (8.3 m). She displaced 15,200 long tons (15,400 t) at normal load. Asahi had a complete double bottom with 55 watertight compartments. Her hull was also subdivided into 223 watertight compartments. She was fitted as a flagship and her crew numbered about 773 officers and enlisted men, including the admiral's staff.

The ship was powered by two vertical triple-expansion steam engines built by Humphrys, Tennant, each driving one propeller, using steam generated by 25 Belleville boilers at a working pressure of 1,703 kPa; 247 psi (17.03 bar). The engines were rated at 15,000 indicated horsepower (11,000 kW), using forced draught, and designed to reach a top speed of 18 knots (33 km/h; 21 mph) although Asahi reached 18.3 knots (33.9 km/h; 21.1 mph) from 16,335 ihp (12,181 kW) during her sea trials on 23 March 1900. She carried a maximum of 2,000 long tons (2,032 t) of coal which allowed her to steam for 9,000 nautical miles (17,000 km; 10,000 mi) at a speed of 10 knots (19 km/h; 12 mph). The ship was fitted with three steam-driven 4.8-kilowatt (6.4 hp) dynamos.

=== Armament ===
Asahi's main battery consisted of the same four Elswick Ordnance Company 40-calibre twelve-inch guns used in all of Japan's preceding battleships. They were mounted in twin-gun turrets fore and aft of the superstructure. The hydraulically powered mountings allowed the guns to be loaded at all angles of traverse, at a fixed elevation of +13.5°. Each mount could traverse a total of 240 degrees. They fired 850-pound (386 kg) projectiles at a muzzle velocity of 2,400 ft/s (730 m/s).

The ship's secondary armament consisted of fourteen 40-calibre 6-inch (152 mm) quick-firing (QF) guns mounted in casemates. Eight of these guns were positioned on the main deck and the other six guns were placed above them in the superstructure. They fired 100-pound (45 kg) shells at a muzzle velocity of 2,300 ft/s (700 m/s). Protection against torpedo-boat attacks was provided by twenty QF 12-pounder 12 cwt (Note: "Cwt" is the abbreviation for hundredweight, 12 cwt referring to the weight of the gun.) guns. The 12-pounders fired 3-inch (76 mm), 12.5-pound (5.7 kg) projectiles at a muzzle velocity of 2,359 ft/s (719 m/s). Lighter guns consisted of eight 47-millimetre (1.9 in) three-pounder Hotchkiss guns and four 47-millimetre 2.5-pounder Hotchkiss guns. The former were mounted in the superstructure and the latter in the fighting tops. The three-pounder gun fired 3.19-pound (1.45 kg) projectiles at a muzzle velocity of 1,927 ft/s (587 m/s), while the 2.5-pounder fired 2.5-pound (1.1 kg) shells at a muzzle velocity of 1,420 ft/s (430 m/s). The ship was also equipped with four submerged 18-inch torpedo tubes, two on each broadside.

Asahi, like all the other Japanese battleships of the time, was fitted with four Barr and Stroud FA3 coincidence rangefinders that had an effective range of 8,000 yards (7,300 m). The ships were also fitted with 24-power magnification telescopic gunsights.

=== Armour ===
The waterline main belt of Asahi consisted of Harvey armour 8 feet (2.44 m) high, of which 3 feet 8 inches (1.11 m) was above the waterline at normal load, and had a maximum thickness of 9 inches (229 mm) for the middle 224 feet (68.28 m) of the ship. It was only 4 inches (102 mm) thick at the ends of the ship and was surmounted by a six-inch strake of armour that ran between the barbettes. The barbettes were 14 inches (356 mm) thick, but only 10 inches (254 mm) behind the upper armour strake. The barbette hoods were protected by 10 inches of armour on their face while their sides were 6 inches thick and the roof was 1.5 inches (38 mm) thick. Diagonal bulkheads connecting the barbettes to the side armour were 12–14 inches thick, but only 6 inches thick at the lower deck level. The frontal armour of the casemates protecting the secondary armament was also 6 inches thick with the rear protected by 2-inch (51 mm) armour plates. The flat portion of the deck armour was 2.5 inches (64 mm) thick and 4 inches (102 mm) thick where it sloped down to the sides of the ship. The conning tower was protected by 14 inches of armour.

== Construction and career ==
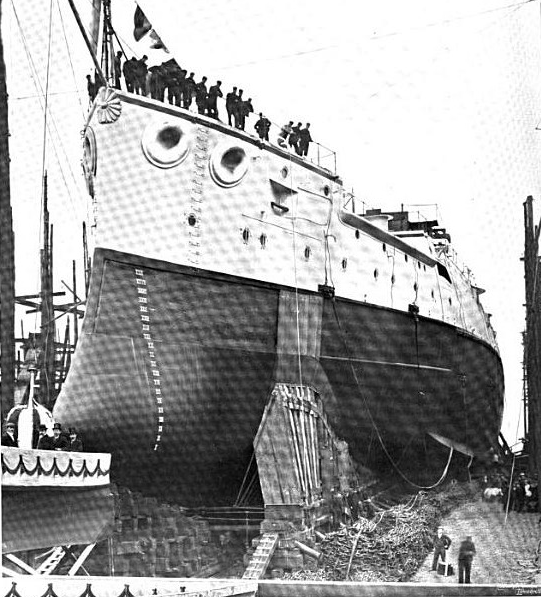
Asahi shortly before her launch

Asahi, meaning "rising sun", a poetic name for Japan from a stanza of waka poetry, (Note: 敷島の やまと心を 人問わば 朝日ににほう 山ざくら花 Shikishima-no Yamatogokoro-wo Hito-Towaba Asahi-ni-niwou Yamazakurabana by Motoori Norinaga.) was laid down on 1 August 1898 in Clydebank, Scotland, by the Clydebank Engineering & Shipbuilding Co. and completed by John Brown & Company, which purchased the firm before Asahi was completed. She was launched on 13 March 1899 and completed on 31 July 1900. Her completion was delayed by about three months when her bottom plating required repairs after running aground off Southsea following sea trials. The ship departed England, after repairs in Portsmouth, on the day of her completion, and arrived at Yokosuka, Japan, on 23 October 1900. Asahi became flagship of the Standing Fleet on 22 May 1901 and was assigned to the 1st Battleship Division of the 1st Fleet when the Combined Fleet was re-formed on 28 December 1903.

At the start of the Russo-Japanese War, Asahi, commanded by Captain Hikohachi Yamada, was assigned to the 1st Division of the 1st Fleet. She participated in the Battle of Port Arthur on 9 February 1904, when Vice Admiral Tōgō Heihachirō led the 1st Fleet in an attack on the Russian ships of the Pacific Squadron anchored just outside Port Arthur. Tōgō had expected the surprise night attack by his destroyers to be much more successful than it was, anticipating that the Russians would be badly disorganized and weakened, but they had recovered from their surprise and were ready for his attack. The Japanese ships were spotted by the protected cruiser Boyarin, which was patrolling offshore and alerted the Russian defences. Tōgō chose to attack the Russian coastal defences with his main armament and engage the ships with his secondary guns. Splitting his fire proved to be a poor decision as the Japanese eight-inch (203 mm) and six-inch guns inflicted little damage on the Russian ships, which concentrated all their fire on the Japanese ships with some effect. Although many ships on both sides were hit, Russian casualties numbered only 17, while the Japanese suffered 60 killed and wounded before Tōgō disengaged. Asahi was not hit during the engagement.

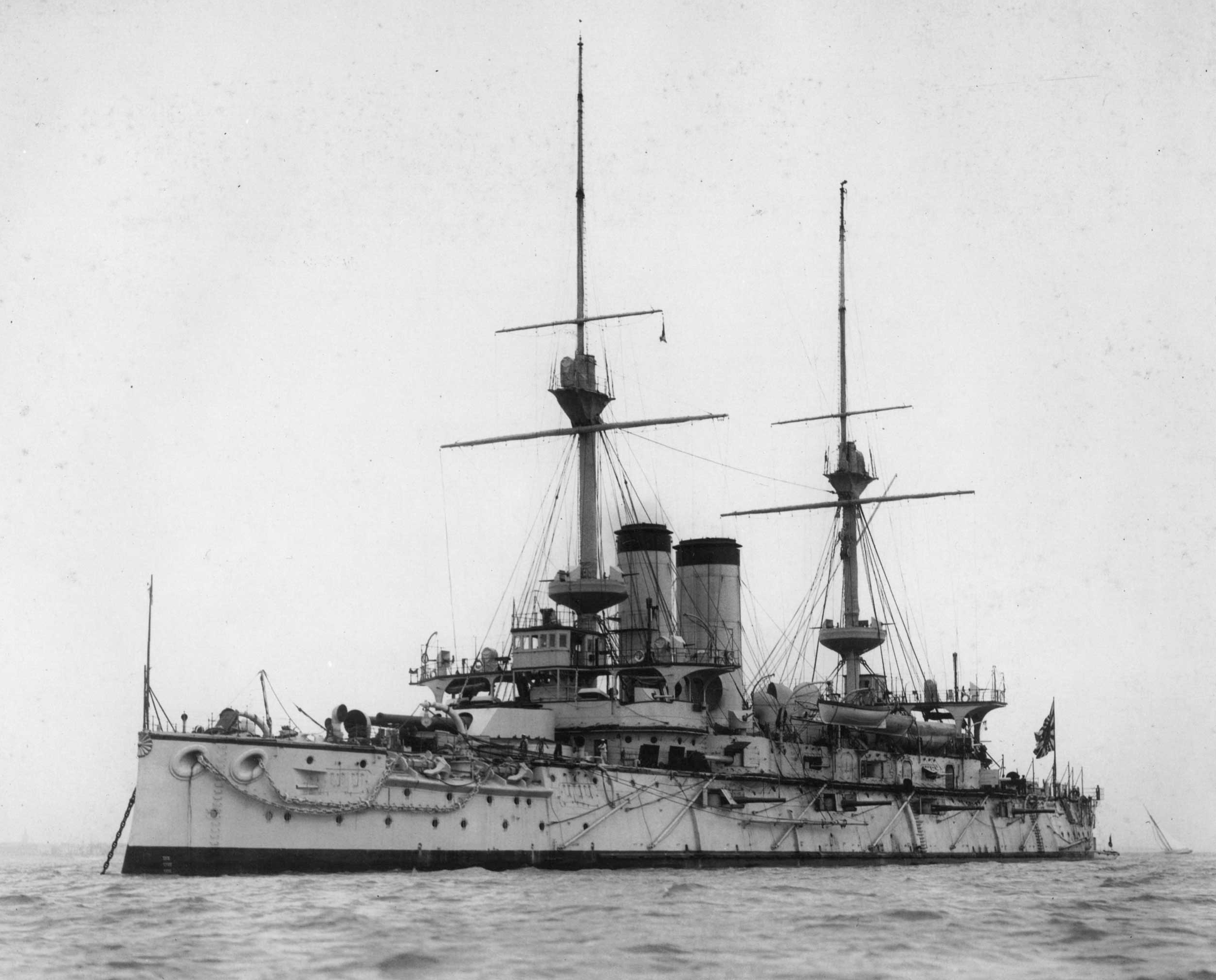
Asahi on completion in 1900

The ship participated in the action of 13 April, when Tōgō successfully lured out a portion of the Pacific Squadron, including Vice Admiral Stepan Makarov's flagship, the battleship Petropavlovsk. When Makarov spotted the five battleships of the 1st Division, he turned back for Port Arthur and Petropavlovsk struck a minefield laid by the Japanese the previous night. The Russian battleship sank in less than two minutes after one of her magazines exploded, and Makarov was one of the 677 killed. Emboldened by his success, Tōgō resumed long-range bombardment missions, prompting the Russians to lay more minefields, which sank two Japanese battleships the following month.

During the Battle of the Yellow Sea on 10 August, Asahi, now commanded by Captain Tsunaakira Nomoto, was second in line of the column of Japanese battleships, behind Mikasa, and was one of the primary targets of the Russian ships. She was only hit by a single 12-inch shell that wounded two crewmen. Both guns in her aft 12-inch gun turret, however, were disabled by shells that detonated prematurely in their barrels. In turn she concentrated most of her fire upon the battleships Poltava and Tsesarevich although both ships were only lightly damaged by the Japanese shells, which generally failed to penetrate any armour and detonated on impact. The ship made the critical hits of the battle, however, when two of her 12-inch shells struck the bridge of Tsesarevich, killing the Russian squadron commander, Vice Admiral Wilgelm Vitgeft, two of his staff officers and the ship's quartermaster. The ship's wheel was jammed to port by wreckage and then slowed to a halt which threw the rest of the Russian ships into total confusion. The second-in-command, Rear Admiral Prince Pavel Ukhtomsky, eventually gained control of the remainder of the squadron and headed back to Port Arthur. Slightly more than two months later, on 26 October, Asahi struck a mine off Port Arthur while on blockade duty. Severely damaged, she was under repair at Sasebo Naval Arsenal from November 1904 to April 1905. Russian naval forces in the Far East had been destroyed or neutralized by this time and the Russians were forced to transfer ships from the Baltic Fleet that did not arrive until May.

=== Battle of Tsushima ===
At the Battle of Tsushima on 27 May 1905, Asahi again followed the battleship Mikasa into combat, this time against the Second and Third Pacific Squadrons. Mikasa opened fire at the battleship Knyaz Suvorov, the Russian flagship, at 14:10, and was joined by Asahi and the armoured cruiser Azuma shortly afterwards. Within an hour the Japanese ships had started a serious fire aboard the Russian ship, badly wounded the fleet commander, Vice Admiral Zinovy Rozhestvensky, knocked out her rear 12-inch gun turret, and jammed Knyaz Suvorov's steering so that she fell out of formation. The Russian ships were concentrating their fire on Mikasa during the early part of the battle and Asahi was not damaged during this time. Tōgō was able to cross the T of the Russian squadrons. Knyaz Suvorov's steering was later repaired, but she blundered between the Japanese and Russian fleets several times later in the battle and was heavily damaged. Asahi seems to have mostly engaged the battleships Borodino and Oryol in the late stages of the battle, although Fuji fired the shots that caused the Borodino's magazines to explode and sink her. Asahi fired more twelve-inch shells, 142, than any other ship during the battle. In total, the ship was hit six times during the battle, but none of them damaged her significantly. Asahi lost 1 officer and 6 men, 5 men seriously wounded, 1 officer and 18 men lightly wounded. In total, the Japanese only lost 110 men killed and 590 wounded to all causes during the battle. The battle was a total Japanese victory with four Russian battleships captured and incorporated into the IJN.

Captain W. C. Pakenham, the Royal Navy's official military observer under the Anglo-Japanese Alliance, took notes of the battle's progress from a deck chair on Asahi's exposed quarterdeck. His report confirmed the superiority of Japanese training and tactics and publicized the victory in the West.

=== Later career ===
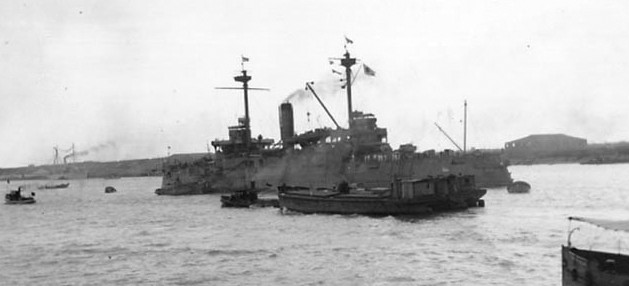
Asahi off Shanghai in the late 1930s

In 1908, Asahi was part of the Japanese fleet that escorted the American Great White Fleet through Japanese waters during its round-the-globe voyage. The ship was assigned to the 1st Fleet in 1908 and 1910–11. Asahi became a gunnery training ship in 1914, and was re-armed in 1917 with Japanese guns replacing her original British-made guns. The same year, she was assigned to the 5th Division of the 3rd Fleet. In 1918, Asahi became flagship of her division and participated in the Japanese intervention in the Russian Civil War. She escorted troop convoys to the Russian Far East and was guard ship at Kamchatka from January to August 1918. Asahi was reclassified as a first-class coastal defence ship on 1 September 1921, and began disarmament in 1922 at Yokosuka in compliance with the terms of the Washington Naval Treaty. She was reclassified as a training and submarine depot ship on 1 April 1923 and her disarmament was completed in July of that same year. Her displacement dropped to 11,441 long tons (11,625 t) with the loss of her armour and guns, and her speed was limited to 12 knots (22 km/h; 14 mph).

The navy decided to convert Asahi into a submarine salvage ship and she began the first stage of her conversion with the installation of specialized salvage equipment from February to August 1925. From 1926 to October 1927, the ship's 25 Belleville boilers were replaced with four Kanpon Type RO boilers at Kure Naval Arsenal. One of her two funnels was also removed, and two large lifting frames were installed as part of the second stage of her conversion. The ship conducted experiments in submarine rescue using the old German submarine 0-1 (ex-U-125). In May 1928, Asahi was fitted with a 62-foot-4-inch (19 m) compressed-air aircraft catapult on her forecastle and successfully launched an E2N1 Type 15 seaplane. After repeated accidents, the catapult was replaced by one powered by gunpowder. On the completion of testing in 1928, Asahi was placed in reserve.

Reclassified as a repair ship on 16 August 1937, Asahi was taken out of reserve in November, after the Marco Polo Bridge Incident that started the Second Sino-Japanese War, and was used as a transport to land troops in an amphibious landing at Hangzhou Bay. Afterwards she began conversion at Kure, Japan, into a repair ship; this was completed on 18 December 1938. Asahi was fitted with a dummy wooden main battery fore and aft to resemble an old battleship after her arrival in Shanghai on 29 December. In May 1939 she was modified to act as a torpedo depot ship and carried out patrols between 29 May and 7 November 1940. She was transferred to Camranh Bay, French Indochina, on 15 November 1940 and later transported the 11th Base Unit from Kure to Camranh Bay 19 November – 7 December 1941.

From 13 March 1942, Asahi was stationed at Singapore, and in April her crew performed repairs on the light cruiser Naka, which had been torpedoed by the submarine USS Seawolf off Christmas Island. Departing Singapore for Kure on 22 May, escorted by the subchaser CH-9, Asahi was sighted by the submarine USS Salmon on the night of 25/26 May 1942, 100 miles (160 km) southeast of Cape Padaran, Indochina. (Note: Now Mũi Dinh 11°22′0″N 109°1′0″E, Vietnam) Of Salmon's four torpedoes, two hit the ship in her port central boiler room and aft spaces. At 01:03, moments after being hit, Asahi sank at 10°00′N 110°00′E. Sixteen men were killed in the attack; the ship's captain and 582 crewmen were rescued by CH-9.
