= SM U-122 =

Coordinates: 50°30′00″N 01°24′00″W

History

German Empire
- Name: U-122
- Ordered: 27 May 1916
- Builder: AG Vulcan, Hamburg
- Yard number: 299
- Launched: 9 December 1917
- Commissioned: 4 May 1918
- Fate: Surrendered 26 November 1918; scuttled English Channel 1 July 1921.

General characteristics
- Class & type: Type UE II submarine
- Type: Coastal minelaying submarine
- Displacement: 1,163 t (1,145 long tons) surfaced; 1,468 t (1,445 long tons) submerged
- Length: 82.00 m (269 ft) (o/a)
- Beam: 7.42 m (24 ft 4 in)
- Height: 10.16 m (33 ft 4 in)
- Draught: 4.22 m (13 ft 10 in)
- Installed power: 2 × diesel engines, 2,400 PS (1,765 kW; 2,367 shp); 2 × electric motors, 1,235 PS (908 kW; 1,218 shp)
- Propulsion: 2 shafts, 2 × 1.61 m (5 ft 3 in) propellers
- Speed: 14.7 knots (27.2 km/h; 16.9 mph) surfaced; 7.2 knots (13.3 km/h; 8.3 mph) submerged
- Range: 11,470 nmi (21,240 km; 13,200 mi) at 8 knots (15 km/h; 9.2 mph) surfaced; 35 nmi (65 km; 40 mi) at 4.5 knots (8.3 km/h; 5.2 mph) submerged
- Test depth: 75 m (246 ft)
- Complement: 4 officers, 36 enlisted
- Armament: 4 × 50 cm (19.7 in) bow torpedo tubes; 12 torpedoes; 2 × 100 cm (39 in) stern mine chutes; 42 mines; 1 × 15 cm (5.9 in) SK L/45 deck gun; 494 rounds

Service record
- Part of: I Flotilla; Unknown start – 11 November 1918
- Commanders: Kptlt. Alfred Korte; 4 May – 11 November 1918
- Operations: 1 patrol
- Victories: 1 merchant ship sunk (278 GRT)

SM U-122 (Note: "SM" stands for "Seiner Majestät" (English: His Majesty's) and combined with the U for Unterseeboot would be translated as His Majesty's Submarine.) was a Type UE II long-range minelayer submarine of the Imperial German Navy during World War I. U-122 was engaged in naval warfare and took part in the First Battle of the Atlantic. U-122 succeeded in sinking one ship during her career for a total of 278 gross register tons (GRT).

U-122 was surrendered to the Allies at Harwich on 26 November 1918 in accordance with the requirements of the Armistice with Germany. She was later laid up at Chatham until towed out round into the English Channel and scuttled off the Isle of Wight on 1 July 1921.

== Design ==
Type UE II submarines were preceded by the shorter Type UE I submarines. U-122 had a displacement of 1,163 tonnes (1,145 long tons) when at the surface and 1,468 tonnes (1,445 long tons) while submerged. She had a total length of 82 metres (269 ft), a beam of 7.42 m (24 ft 4 in), a height of 10.12 m (33 ft 2 in), and a draught of 4.22 m (13 ft 10 in). The submarine was powered by two 2,400 metric horsepower (1,800 kW; 2,400 shp) engines for use while surfaced, and two 1,235 metric horsepower (908 kW; 1,218 shp) engines for use while submerged. She had two shafts and two 1.61 m (5.3 ft) propellers. She was capable of operating at depths of up to 75 metres (246 ft).

The submarine had a maximum surface speed of 14.7 knots (27.2 km/h; 16.9 mph) and a maximum submerged speed of 7.2 knots (13.3 km/h; 8.3 mph). When submerged, she could operate for 35 nautical miles (65 km; 40 mi) at 4.5 knots (8.3 km/h; 5.2 mph); when surfaced, she could travel 11,470 nautical miles (21,240 km; 13,200 mi) at 8 knots (15 km/h; 9.2 mph). U-122 was fitted with four 50 centimetres (20 in) torpedo tubes (fitted at the bow), twelve torpedoes, two 100 centimetres (39 in) mine chutes (fitted at the stern), forty-two mines, one 15 cm (5.9 in) SK L/45 deck gun, and 494 rounds. She had a complement of forty (thirty-six crew members and four officers).

== Summary of raiding history ==
Date	Name	Nationality	Tonnage (Note: Tonnages are in gross register tons)	Fate
18 October 1918	Njordur	Iceland	278	Sunk

== Bibliography ==
- Gröner, Erich; Jung, Dieter; Maass, Martin (1991). U-boats and Mine Warfare Vessels. German Warships 1815–1945. Vol. 2. Translated by Thomas, Keith; Magowan, Rachel. London: Conway Maritime Press. ISBN 0-85177-593-4.
