= SM U-121 =

German mine laying submarine

History

German Empire
- Name: U-121
- Builder: AG Vulcan, Hamburg
- Cost: 6,177,000 Goldmark
- Yard number: 95
- Launched: 20 September 1918
- In service: 9 March 1919
- Fate: Surrendered on 9 March 1919 to France; Sunk as target off Cherbourg, 1 July 1921

General characteristics
- Class & type: Type UE II submarine
- Type: Coastal minelaying submarine
- Displacement: 1,164 t (1,146 long tons) surfaced; 1,512 t (1,488 long tons) submerged
- Length: 81.52 m (267 ft 5 in) (o/a)
- Beam: 7.42 m (24 ft 4 in)
- Height: 10.16 m (33 ft 4 in)
- Draught: 4.22 m (13 ft 10 in)
- Installed power: 2 × diesel engines, 2,400 PS (1,765 kW; 2,367 shp); 2 × electric motors, 1,200 PS (883 kW; 1,184 shp)
- Propulsion: 2 shafts, 2 × 1.61 m (5 ft 3 in) propellers
- Speed: 14.7 knots (27.2 km/h; 16.9 mph) surfaced; 7 knots (13 km/h; 8.1 mph) submerged
- Range: 13,900 nmi (25,700 km; 16,000 mi) at 8 knots (15 km/h; 9.2 mph) surfaced; 35 nmi (65 km; 40 mi) at 4.5 knots (8.3 km/h; 5.2 mph) submerged
- Test depth: 75 m (246 ft)
- Complement: 4 officers, 36 enlisted
- Armament: 4 × 50 cm (19.7 in) bow torpedo tubes; 14 torpedoes; 2 × 100 cm (39 in) stern mine chutes; 42 mines; 1 × 15 cm (5.9 in) SK L/45 deck gun; 494 rounds

SM U-121 (Note: "SM" stands for "Seiner Majestät" (English: His Majesty's) and combined with the U for Unterseeboot would be translated as His Majesty's Submarine.) was a Type UE II long-range minelaying U-boat of the Imperial German Navy intended for service in the Mediterranean. The Austro-Hungarian Navy allocated her the number SM U-84. She was built at Hamburg, Germany, by Aktiengesellschaft Vulcan and launched on 20 September 1918. Incomplete at the Armistice she was never commissioned in the Imperial German Navy but surrendered to the Allies at Harwich on 9 March 1919. Handed over to France, she was sunk as a gunnery target off Cherbourg on 1 July 1921.

== Bibliography ==
- Gröner, Erich; Jung, Dieter; Maass, Martin (1991). U-boats and Mine Warfare Vessels. German Warships 1815–1945. Vol. 2. Translated by Thomas, Keith; Magowan, Rachel. London: Conway Maritime Press. ISBN 0-85177-593-4.
