= SM UB-121 =

Coordinates: 50°44′32.42″N 0°12′5.69″E

- UB-148 at sea, a U-boat similar to UB-121.

History

German Empire
- Name: UB-121
- Ordered: 6 / 8 February 1917
- Builder: AG Weser, Bremen
- Cost: 3,654,000 German Papiermark
- Yard number: 294
- Laid down: 12 May 1917
- Launched: 6 January 1918
- Commissioned: 10 February 1918
- Fate: Surrendered 20 November 1918; wrecked in tow 15 April 1919

General characteristics
- Class & type: Type UB III submarine
- Displacement: 512 t (504 long tons) surfaced; 643 t (633 long tons) submerged
- Length: 55.85 m (183 ft 3 in) (o/a)
- Beam: 5.80 m (19 ft)
- Draught: 3.72 m (12 ft 2 in)
- Propulsion: 2 × propeller shaft; 2 × Körting four-stroke 6-cylinder diesel engines, 1,050 bhp (780 kW); 2 × Siemens-Schuckert electric motors, 780 shp (580 kW)
- Speed: 13.9 knots (25.7 km/h; 16.0 mph) surfaced; 7.6 knots (14.1 km/h; 8.7 mph) submerged
- Range: 7,280 nmi (13,480 km; 8,380 mi) at 6 knots (11 km/h; 6.9 mph) surfaced; 55 nmi (102 km; 63 mi) at 4 knots (7.4 km/h; 4.6 mph) submerged
- Test depth: 50 m (160 ft)
- Complement: 3 officers, 31 men
- Armament: 5 × 50 cm (19.7 in) torpedo tubes (4 bow, 1 stern); 10 torpedoes; 1 × 8.8 cm (3.46 in) deck gun

Service record
- Part of: III Flotilla; 19 May – 11 November 1918
- Commanders: Oblt.z.S. Albrecht Schmidt; 10 February – 11 November 1918
- Operations: 3 patrols
- Victories: None

SM UB-121 was a German Type UB III submarine or U-boat in the German Imperial Navy (German: Kaiserliche Marine) during World War I. She was commissioned into the German Imperial Navy on 10 February 1918 as SM UB-121. (Note: "SM" stands for "Seiner Majestät" (English: His Majesty's) and combined with the U for Unterseeboot would be translated as His Majesty's Submarine.)

UB-121 was surrendered to the Allies at Harwich on 20 November 1918 in accordance with the requirements of the Armistice with Germany. She was transferred to France in 1919, but while in tow to Brest in company with U-118 she ran aground at Birling Gap on 15 April 1919. The wreck was sold by the British Admiralty to R. Longmate for £500 on 3 May 1919, and broken up in situ, although a few pieces remain in situ.

== Construction ==
She was built by AG Weser of Bremen and following just under a year of construction, launched at Bremen on 6 January 1918. UB-121 was commissioned later the same year under the command of Oblt.z.S. Albrecht Schmidt. Like all Type UB III submarines, UB-121 carried 10 torpedoes and was armed with a 8.8 cm (3.46 in) deck gun. UB-121 would carry a crew of up to 3 officer and 31 men and had a cruising range of 7,280 nautical miles (13,480 km; 8,380 mi). UB-121 had a displacement of 512 t (504 long tons) while surfaced and 643 t (633 long tons) when submerged. Her engines enabled her to travel at 13.9 knots (25.7 km/h; 16.0 mph) when surfaced and 7.6 knots (14.1 km/h; 8.7 mph) when submerged.

== Bibliography ==
- Bendert, Harald (2000). Die UB-Boote der Kaiserlichen Marine, 1914-1918. Einsätze, Erfolge, Schicksal (in German). Hamburg: Verlag E.S. Mittler & Sohn GmbH. ISBN 3-8132-0713-7.
- Gröner, Erich; Jung, Dieter; Maass, Martin (1991). U-boats and Mine Warfare Vessels. German Warships 1815–1945. Vol. 2. Translated by Thomas, Keith; Magowan, Rachel. London: Conway Maritime Press. ISBN 0-85177-593-4.
- Rössler, Eberhard (1979). Die deutschen U-Boote und ihre Werften: eine Bilddokumentation über den deutschen U-Bootbau; in zwei Bänden (in German). Vol. I. Munich: Bernard & Graefe. ISBN 3-7637-5213-7.
