= SM U-120 =

History

German Empire
- Name: U-120
- Ordered: 27 May 1916
- Builder: AG Vulcan, Hamburg
- Yard number: 94
- Launched: 20 June 1918
- Commissioned: 31 August 1918
- Fate: Surrendered on 22 November 1918; Broken up in April 1919

General characteristics
- Class & type: Type UE II submarine
- Type: Coastal minelaying submarine
- Displacement: 1,164 t (1,146 long tons) surfaced; 1,512 t (1,488 long tons) submerged
- Length: 81.52 m (267 ft 5 in) (o/a); 61.20 m (200 ft 9 in) (pressure hull)
- Beam: 7.42 m (24 ft 4 in)
- Height: 10.16 m (33 ft 4 in)
- Draught: 4.22 m (13 ft 10 in)
- Installed power: 2 × diesel engines, 2,400 PS (1,765 kW; 2,367 shp); 2 × electric motors, 1,200 PS (883 kW; 1,184 shp)
- Propulsion: 2 shafts, 2 × 1.61 m (5 ft 3 in) propellers
- Speed: 14.7 knots (27.2 km/h; 16.9 mph) surfaced; 7 knots (13 km/h; 8.1 mph) submerged
- Range: 13,900 nmi (25,700 km; 16,000 mi) at 8 knots (15 km/h; 9.2 mph) surfaced; 35 nmi (65 km; 40 mi) at 4.5 knots (8.3 km/h; 5.2 mph) submerged
- Test depth: 75 m (246 ft)
- Complement: 4 officers, 36 enlisted
- Armament: 4 × 50 cm (19.7 in) bow torpedo tubes; 14 torpedoes; 2 × 100 cm (39 in) stern mine chutes; 42 mines; 1 × 15 cm (5.9 in) SK L/45 deck gun; 494 rounds

Service record
- Commanders: Kptlt. Hans von Mellenthin; 31 August – 11 November 1918
- Operations: None
- Victories: None

SM U-120 (Note: "SM" stands for "Seiner Majestät" (English: His Majesty's) and combined with the U for Unterseeboot would be translated as His Majesty's Submarine.) was a Type UE II long-range minelayer submarine of the Imperial German Navy. She was built at Hamburg, Germany, by Aktiengesellschaft Vulcan and launched on 20 June 1918. She was commissioned in the Imperial German Navy on 31 August 1918 with Kapitänleutnant Hans von Mellenthin in command. She had a short-lived career, not being assigned to any flotillas, nor achieving any successful attacks on enemy shipping, before the end of the First World War. She was surrendered to Italy on 22 November 1918, and was broken up in April 1919 at La Spezia.

== Design ==
Type UE II submarines were preceded by the shorter Type UE I submarines. U-120 had a displacement of 1,164 tonnes (1,146 long tons) when at the surface and 1,512 tonnes (1,488 long tons) while submerged. She had a total length of 81.52 metres (267 ft 5 in), a beam of 7.42 m (24 ft 4 in), a height of 10.16 m (33 ft 4 in), and a draught of 4.22 m (13 ft 10 in). The submarine was powered by two 2,400 metric horsepower (1,800 kW; 2,400 shp) engines for use while surfaced, and two 1,200 metric horsepower (880 kW; 1,200 shp) engines for use while submerged. She had two shafts and two 1.61 m (5 ft 3 in) propellers. She was capable of operating at depths of up to 75 metres (246 ft).

The submarine had a maximum surface speed of 14.7 knots (27.2 km/h; 16.9 mph) and a maximum submerged speed of 7 knots (13 km/h; 8.1 mph). When submerged, she could operate for 35 nautical miles (65 km; 40 mi) at 4.5 knots (8.3 km/h; 5.2 mph); when surfaced, she could travel 13,900 nautical miles (25,700 km; 16,000 mi) at 8 knots (15 km/h; 9.2 mph). U-120 was fitted with four 50 centimetres (20 in) torpedo tubes (fitted at its bow), fourteen torpedoes, two 100 centimetres (39 in) mine chutes (fitted at its stern), forty-two mines, one 15 cm (5.9 in) SK L/45 deck gun, and 494 rounds. She had a complement of forty (thirty-six crew members and four officers).

== Bibliography ==
- Gröner, Erich; Jung, Dieter; Maass, Martin (1991). U-boats and Mine Warfare Vessels. German Warships 1815–1945. Vol. 2. Translated by Thomas, Keith; Magowan, Rachel. London: Conway Maritime Press. ISBN 0-85177-593-4.
