= Type UE II submarine =

Class of German mine laying submarines

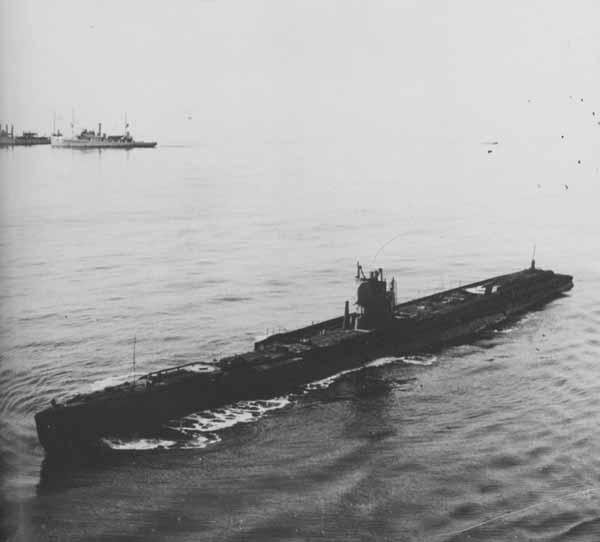
- SM U-117 at Cape Charles

Class overview
- Builders: AG Vulkan, Hamburg; Blohm & Voss, Hamburg
- Operators: Imperial German Navy; French Navy; Imperial Japanese Navy
- Subclasses: U-122
- Built: 1917–1918
- In commission: 1917–1918
- Completed: 10
- Lost: 4
- Scrapped: 6

General characteristics
- Type: Ocean-going mine-laying submarine
- Displacement: 1,164 t (1,146 long tons) surfaced; 1,512 t (1,488 long tons) submerged
- Length: 81.52 or 82 m (267 ft 5 in or 269 ft 0 in)
- Beam: 7.42 m (24 ft 4 in)
- Draft: 4.22 m (13 ft 10 in)
- Installed power: Diesel engines 2,400 PS (1,765 kW; 2,367 shp); Electric motors 1,200 PS (883 kW; 1,184 shp)
- Propulsion: 2 shafts; 2 diesel engines, 2 electric motors
- Speed: 14.7 knots (27.2 km/h; 16.9 mph) surfaced; 7 knots (13 km/h; 8.1 mph) submerged
- Range: 11,470 and 13,900 nmi (21,240 and 25,740 km; 13,200 and 16,000 mi) at 8 knots (15 km/h; 9.2 mph) surfaced; 35 nmi (65 km; 40 mi) at 4.5 knots (8.3 km/h; 5.2 mph) submerged
- Test depth: 75 m (246 ft)
- Complement: 4 officers, 36 enlisted men
- Sensors & processing systems: 2 periscopes
- Armament: 4 × 50 cm (19.7 in) torpedo tubes, 14 torpedoes; 2 × 100 cm (39.4 in) minelaying tubes, 42 mines; 1 × 15-centimeter (5.9 in) SK L/45 deck gun; or 2 × 10.5-centimeter (4.1 in) SK L/45 (SM U 123)

The Type UE II submarines were a class of submarines built by the German Empire during World War I as long-range mine-layers.

UE II boats carried 14 torpedoes and were armed with one 150 mm deck gun. They carried a crew of 40 and had a cruising range of about 9,400 miles. Nine were built between 1917 and 1918.

The UE IIs joined the conflict in the middle of 1917, at a time when the tide of the war was turning against Germany. In the months beforehand, the United States Navy was added to the ranks of their enemies; and the convoy system was introduced, making it difficult to engage enemy merchant shipping without being spotted by destroyer escorts. Because they entered service late in the war, the UE IIs only sank 23 ships and damaged 4 others before the end of hostilities. SM U-117 was by far the most successful U-boat, taking credit for 20 ships sunk out of the total of 23 for the entire type. The UE II's were the last of the UE class U-boats built by the German Imperial Navy; the last of the class, U-126, was commissioned on 3 October 1918, a little over a month before the armistice at Compiègne.

== Post-war years ==
Following the end of the war, all of the Type UE II submarines were handed over to the allies as part of the Treaty of Versailles. SM U-117 was handed over to the United States where she remained in the Philadelphia Navy Yard along with other U-boats. In June 1921 she was taken out to sea and sunk as a target for aerial bombing tests conducted by the Navy and Army. SM U-118 was turned over to France but broke her tow and was washed ashore at Hastings in Sussex where she remained until being finally broken up in December 1919. SM U-119 was surrendered to France in November 1918. She was renamed the René Audry and saw service in the French Navy and was eventually broken up in October 1937. SM U-120 was transferred to Italy in November 1918. She was broken up soon after in April 1919. SM U-122 was surrendered to England on 26 November 1918. She later ran aground on the English east coast while on her journey to Scapa Flow. Like SM U-122, SM U-123 also ran aground on the English coast where she was broken up. SM U-124 was surrendered in December 1918 and was later broken up in Swansea in 1921. SM U-125 surrendered to Japan in late November 1918. She served in the Japanese Navy as the O1 in 1920-21. between January and March 1921, U-125 was dismantled at Yokosuka Navy Yard. SM U-126 was handed over to the allies in November 1918 and later broken up at Upnor in 1923.

== Ships sunk or damaged by Type UE II submarines ==
Ships sunk or damaged by Type UE II submarines
Date	Name	Nationality	Tonnage (Note: Merchant ship tonnages are in gross register tons. Military vessels are listed by tons displacement.)	Fate	U-boat credited with loss
10 August 1918	Aleda May	United States	31	Sunk	U-117
10 August 1918	Cruiser	United States	28	Sunk	U-117
10 August 1918	Earl & Nettie	United States	24	Sunk	U-117
10 August 1918	Katie L. Palmer	United States	31	Sunk	U-117
10 August 1918	Mary E. Sennett	United States	26	Sunk	U-117
10 August 1918	Progress	United States	34	Sunk	U-117
10 August 1918	Reliance	United States	19	Sunk	U-117
10 August 1918	William H. Starbuck	United States	53	Sunk	U-117
12 August 1918	Sommerstad	Norway	3,875	Sunk	U-117
13 August 1918	Frederic R. Kellogg	United States	7,127	Damaged	U-117
14 August 1918	Dorothy B. Barrett	United States	2,088	Sunk	U-117
15 August 1918	Madrugada	United States	1,613	Sunk	U-117
16 August 1918	Mirlo	United Kingdom	6,978	Sunk	U-117
17 August 1918	Nordhav	Norway	2,846	Sunk	U-117
20 August 1918	Ansaldo III	Kingdom of Italy	5,310	Damaged	U-117
24 August 1918	Bianca	United Kingdom	408	Damaged	U-117
26 August 1918	Rush	United States	145	Sunk	U-117
27 August 1918	Bergsdalen	Norway	2,555	Sunk	U-117
30 August 1918	Elsie Porter	United Kingdom	136	Sunk	U-117
30 August 1918	Potentate	United Kingdom	136	Sunk	U-117
16 September 1918	Wellington	United Kingdom	5,600	Sunk	U-118
29 September 1918	USS Minnesota	United States Navy	18,000	Damaged	U-117
2 October 1918	Arca	United Kingdom	4,839	Sunk	U-118
4 October 1918	San Saba	United States	2,458	Sunk	U-117
18 October 1918	Njordur	(Denmark) Iceland	278	Sunk	U-122
27 October 1918	Chaparra	Cuba	1,510	Sunk	U-117
9 November 1918	Saetia	United States	2,873	Sunk	U-117

== Ships in class ==
There were 9 Type UE II submarines commissioned into the Kaiserliche Marine.

- SM U-117
- SM U-118
- SM U-119
- SM U-120
- SM U-122
- SM U-123
- SM U-124
- SM U-125
- SM U-126

One submarine was not completed before the armistice.

- SM U-121

== Bibliography ==
- Gardiner, Robert; Gray, Randal, eds. (1985). Conway's All the World's Fighting Ships 1906–1921. Annapolis: Naval Institute Press. ISBN 0-85177-245-5.
- Gröner, Erich; Jung, Dieter; Maass, Martin (1991). German Warships 1815–1945, U-boats and Mine Warfare Vessels. Vol. 2. Translated by Thomas, Keith; Magowan, Rachel. London: Conway Maritime Press. ISBN 0-85177-593-4.
