= German submarine U-111 =

U-111 may refer to one of the following German submarines:

- SM U-111, a Type U 93 submarine launched in 1917 that served in the First World War and was surrendered in 1918
  - During the First World War, Germany also had this submarine with a similar name:
    - SM UB-111, a Type UB III submarine launched in 1917 and was surrendered in 1918
- German submarine U-111 (1940), a Type IXB submarine that served in the Second World War and sank in 1941

== See also ==
- U-111 (disambiguation)
