= Jack Cohen (businessman) =

English grocer, Tesco founder (1898–1979)

Sir Jack Cohen
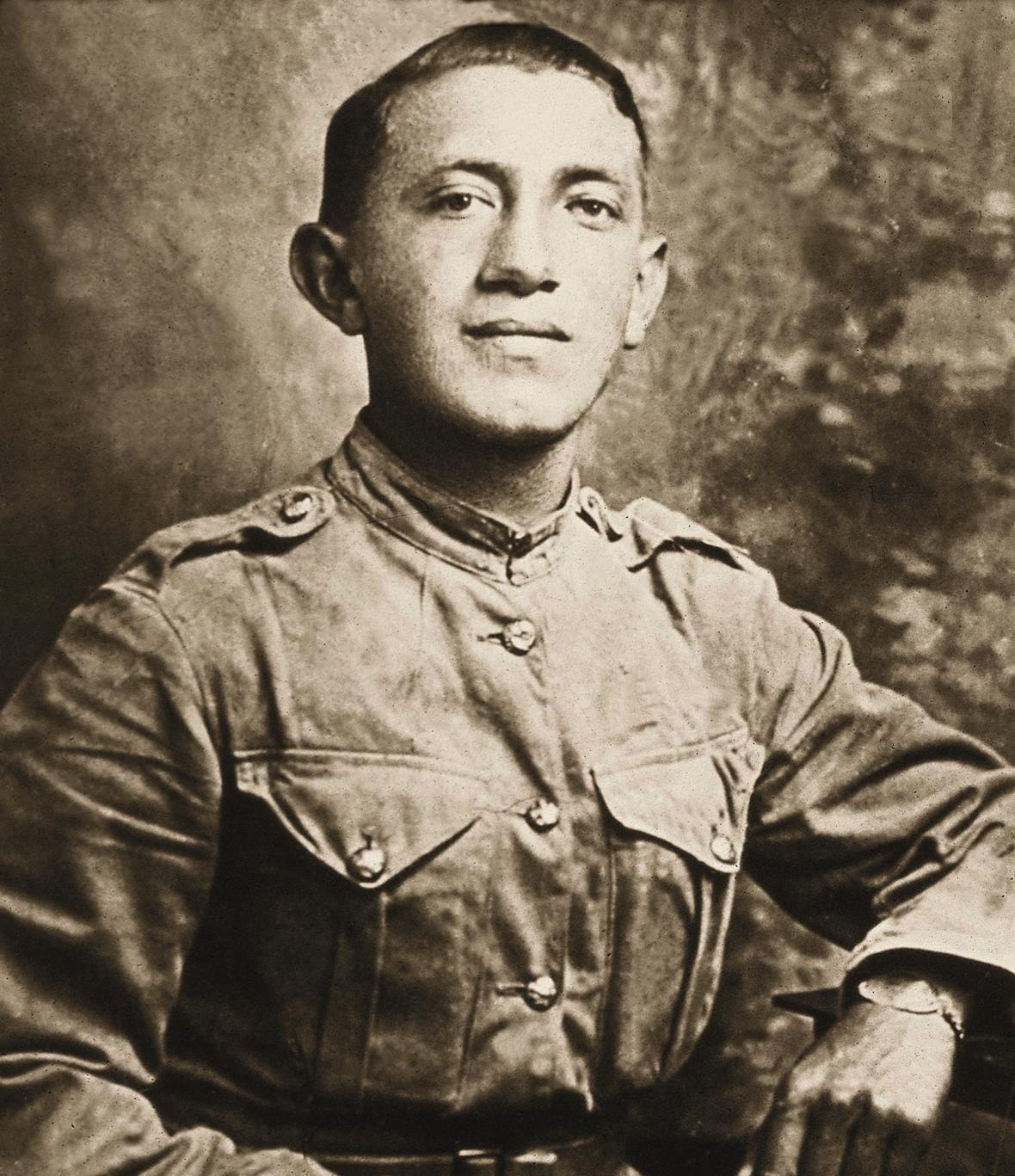
- Cohen in 1919
- Born: Jacob Kohen; 6 October 1898; Whitechapel, London, England
- Died: 24 March 1979 (aged 80); Westminster, London, England
- Resting place: Willesden Jewish Cemetery
- Occupation: Grocer
- Spouse: Sarah (Cissie) Fox (m. 1924)
- Children: 2, including Shirley Porter
- Relatives: Hyman Kreitman (son-in-law)
- Military career
- Allegiance: United Kingdom
- Branch: British Army
- Service years: 1917–1919
- Unit: Royal Flying Corps
- Conflicts: World War I

Sir John Edward Cohen (born Jacob Kohen; 6 October 1898 – 24 March 1979) was an English businessman who founded the supermarket chain Tesco. His company is the market leader of groceries in the UK, and was the third-largest retailer in the world measured by gross revenues in 2011.

After serving in the Royal Flying Corps in the First World War, Cohen opened a market stall in Hackney in the East End of London in 1919. The first Tesco store opened in Edgware, north London, and by 1939 he had more than 100 stores, including the first stores outside London. He then floated the company onto the London Stock Exchange in 1947. As chairman of Tesco Stores (Holdings) Ltd. Cohen was knighted by Queen Elizabeth II in 1969.

== Early and private life ==
Cohen was born in Whitechapel in the East End of London and grew up at 91 Ashfield Street. His family were Jewish: his father, Avroam Kohen, was a Polish immigrant from Łódź who worked as a tailor, and his mother was Sime Zaremba. He was named Jacob but was known as Jack from an early age. He was educated at Rutland Street School until he was aged 14 and then began his working life as an apprentice tailor to his father. His mother died in 1915 and his father remarried.

In 1917, he volunteered to join the Royal Flying Corps where he used his tailoring skills as a canvas maker for balloons and other aircraft. He served in France, and also in Egypt and Palestine. In December 1917, he was on board HMS Osmanieh, a passenger and cargo ship that had been taken over by the Royal Navy as a supply ship and troopship. The vessel had sailed from Southampton carrying soldiers and medical personnel. But just as she reached her destination, Alexandria on the 31st, she struck a naval mine, laid at the harbour entrance a few days earlier by the German submarine SM UC-34. The ship sank in less than seven minutes with the loss of 209 people, including soldiers, nurses, ship's crew and the ship's captain. Cohen survived, thanks to a nurse who helped him stay afloat in the water. He returned to England after contracting malaria, and was demobilised in 1919.

He married Sarah (Cissie) Fox, daughter of an immigrant Russian-Jewish tailor, in 1924. Cissie was a great supporter of her husband's business interests, so much so that the money they received as wedding gifts was invested in a wholesale venture. They had two daughters, Sybil Irene (1926–2005) and Shirley (1930-2026). Irene married Hyman Kreitman (1914–2001) and Shirley married Leslie Porter (1920–2005).

Cohen formally changed his name from Jacob Kohen to John Edward Cohen by deed poll in July 1937.

He continued to work after a colostomy operation in 1958, standing down as chairman of Tesco in 1969. He died on 24 March 1979 at the age of 80 in Westminster and is buried in Willesden Jewish Cemetery.

== Career ==
Cohen was reluctant to return to tailoring after the First World War, and he established himself as a market stall holder in Hackney, in London's East End, by purchasing surplus NAAFI stock with his £30 demob money. At each market the traders would gather and, at a signal, they would race to their favoured pitch. Cohen could not run fast so he simply threw his cap at the spot and this could beat anyone. He soon became the owner of a number of market stalls, and started a wholesale business. Initially the other stalls were run by members of the family, but gradually non-family members were added. Cohen and his wife Elizabeth worked seven days a week, starting at dawn and counting money until late.

In 1924, he created the Tesco brand name from the initials of a partner tea supplier, T. E. Stockwell (formerly Messrs Torring and Stockwell of Mincing Lane), and the first two letters of his surname. The market trading business became difficult to expand because partners tended to be unreliable, so eventually he changed to high street shops without doors, looking and sounding as far as possible like market stalls. The first two Tesco stores opened at Becontree and Burnt Oak in 1931. By 1939, Cohen owned a hundred Tesco stores. His expansion was helped by the growth of new shopping centres. Retailers are often reluctant to be the first to sign a contract in a new centre lest they become the only ones. With his market experience and courage, Cohen was often the one to take that risk and he had ways of drawing a crowd. Developers became keen to help him with his start-up costs because of his ability to get people into a new centre, benefiting the other shops.

The first Tesco bank account was opened at the Midland Bank in the Narroway, Mare Street, Hackney. A plaque in the branch later marked this event. On 2 July 1937 he changed his name by deed poll to John Edward Cohen at the suggestion of his bank manager, whose staff had trouble distinguishing between the many Jacob Cohens banking at the branch in Hackney.

In 1932, having opened his first Tesco-branded shops, Cohen travelled to the United States to review US self-service supermarkets. At the time he was not impressed and felt they would never be accepted in the UK. After the war he took another look and listened to his son-in-law Hyman Kreitman, who was very keen. He opened one of the first British supermarkets. The new strategy was led by Kreitman, who understood how to manage this new style of shop and the crucial tasks of mass buying, selling and logistics. Tesco grew strongly. It gradually drew ahead of its rivals and took over many of them.

He expanded the company by takeovers and mergers, making it the fourth largest chain in the United Kingdom by 1968 (behind Co-op, Fine Fare, and Allied Suppliers). He campaigned against retail price maintenance, tackled in the second half of the 1960s by the Resale Prices Act 1964, and was a leading instigator of the Green Shield trading stamps scheme in 1963.

== Honours ==
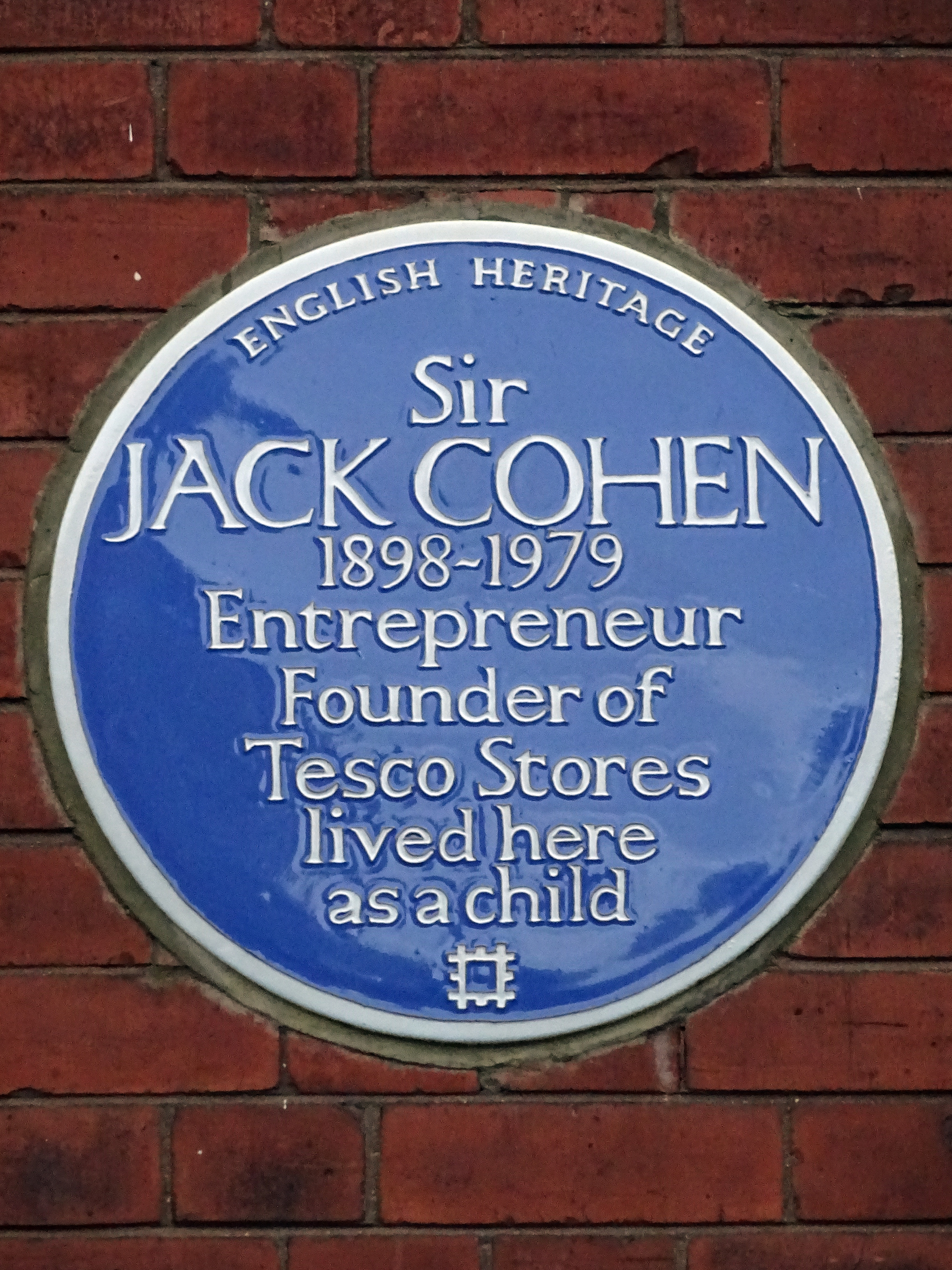
Blue plaque in Whitechapel

Cohen was appointed Knight Bachelor in the 1969 New Year Honours. He was master of the Worshipful Company of Carmen in 1976–77. Sir John and Lady Cohen supported a range of charities in Britain and in Israel, giving their name to the Jewish Care facility, Lady Sarah Cohen House, at Friern Barnet, north London.

In 2009, an English Heritage blue plaque was placed at 91 Ashfield Street, Whitechapel, London, where Cohen lived as a child.

In 2018, Tesco founded a new discount chain named after Cohen, called Jack's. In addition, the name T.E. Stockwell was introduced the same year for use on selected food products, replacing the Tesco Value brand on these goods.
