= List of shipwrecks in August 1918 =

The list of shipwrecks in August 1918 includes ships sunk, foundered, grounded, or otherwise lost during August 1918.

== 1 August ==
List of shipwrecks: 1 August 1918
| Ship | State | Description |
|---|---|---|
| Columbia | Denmark | World War I: The cargo ship was torpedoed and sunk in the Mediterranean Sea off Port Said, Egypt by SM UC-34 (Imperial German Navy) with the loss of a crew member. |
| J. B. Finley | United States | The tow steamer was destroyed by fire on the ways at the Howard Shipyard, Paducah, Kentucky. The fire spread burning down most of the plant. |
| Mikula Selyaninovich | Soviet Navy | Russian Civil War: Allied Intervention in the Russian Civil War; The icebreaker was scuttled at Arkhangelsk to prevent capture by British forces. |
| Svyatogor | Soviet Navy | Russian Civil War: Allied Intervention in the Russian Civil War; The icebreaker was scuttled at Arkhangelsk to prevent capture by British forces. |

== 2 August ==
List of shipwrecks: 2 August 1918
| Ship | State | Description |
|---|---|---|
| Anneliese | Imperial German Navy | World War I: The Anneliese-class Vorpostenboot was sunk by mines in the North Sea. |
| HMS Ariel | Royal Navy | World War I: The Acheron-class destroyer struck a mine at the western end of the Heligoland Bight and sank with the loss of 49 of her 70 crew. |
| Defender | New Zealand | The steamer caught fire at King's Wharf, Wellington, New Zealand. Due to her cargo of benzine she was towed out into the harbour, eventually drifting on to rocks at the north end of Somes Island where she burned furiously for a half hour before exploding, a total loss. |
| Dornfontein | Canada | World War I: The four-masted auxiliary schooner was set afire in the Atlantic Ocean 25 nautical miles (46 km) west north west of Brier Island, Nova Scotia by SM U-156 (Imperial German Navy). She was towed in to port but was a total loss. |
| Flevo X | Netherlands | World War I: The sailing vessel was sunk in the North Sea 40 nautical miles (74 km) east of the Shipwash Lightship (United Kingdom) by SM UB-104 (Imperial German Navy). |
| Floréal | French Navy | The Pluviose-class submarine collided with the armed boarding steamer HMS Hazel (Royal Navy) and sank in the Aegean Sea. |
| Kohler | Imperial German Navy | World War I: The Kabeljau-class Vorpostenboot was sunk by mines in the North Sea. |
| Malvina | United Kingdom | The cargo ship sank in the North Sea 1 nautical mile (1.9 km) north north east of Flamborough Head, Yorkshire with the loss of fourteen of her crew. |
| Portugal | Belgium | World War I: The cargo ship was sunk in the Atlantic Ocean 4 nautical miles (7.4 km) west north west of Trevose Head, Cornwall, United Kingdom (50°32′N 5°07′W) by SM U-113 (Imperial German Navy). |
| Reliance | United States | The tug sank 34 miles (55 km) north east of Colon, Panama. Five crew were killed. |
| Remke | Netherlands | World War I: The sailing vessel was shelled and sunk in the North Sea 55 nautical miles (102 km) west north west of the Hook of Holland, South Holland by SM UB-104 (Imperial German Navy). |
| HMT Scania | Royal Navy | The naval trawler was lost on this date. |
| T-15 | Soviet Navy | Russian Civil War: The T-13-class minesweeper was shelled and sunk at Arkhangelsk by Prince Pozharsky (Russian Navy) White Movement. Salvaged by the Whites, repaired and returned to service. |
| Tokuyama Maru | Japan | World War I: The cargo ship was sunk in the Atlantic Ocean off the east coast of the United States (39°12′N 70°23′W) by SM U-140 (Imperial German Navy). |
| HMS Vehement | Royal Navy | World War I: The V and W-class destroyer struck a mine in the Heligoland Bight and was consequently scuttled. |

== 3 August ==
List of shipwrecks: 3 August 1918
| Ship | State | Description |
|---|---|---|
| Annie Perry | United States | World War I: The schooner was sunk in the Atlantic Ocean 40 nautical miles (74 km) off Seal Island, Nova Scotia, Canada by SM U-156 (Imperial German Navy). Her crew survived. |
| Berwind | United States | World War I: The cargo ship was sunk in the English Channel off Audierne, Manche, France (47°55′N 4°28′W) by SM UB-88 (Imperial German Navy) with the loss of six of her crew. |
| Cambrai | France | World War I: The coaster was torpedoed and sunk in the North Sea 2 nautical miles (3.7 km) east of Flamborough Head, Yorkshire, United Kingdom by SM UB-104 (Imperial German Navy) with the loss of 25 of her crew. |
| Chrysolite | United Kingdom | The cargo ship collided with Geraint (United Kingdom) in the Bristol Channel off Morte Point, Devon and sank. |
| Lake Portage | United States | World War I: The cargo ship was sunk in the English Channel 4.5 nautical miles (8.3 km) south of Audierne (47°56′N 4°44′W) by SM UB-88 (Imperial German Navy) with the loss of three of her crew. |
| Ludvig | Denmark | World War I: The schooner was shelled and sunk in the North Sea east of the Shetland Islands, United Kingdom (60°35′N 3°41′E) by SM UB-120 (Imperial German Navy). Her crew survived. |
| Maceio | Brazil | World War I: The cargo ship was sunk in the Atlantic Ocean off Cape Ortegal, Spain (45°02′N 10°27′W) by SM U-43 (Imperial German Navy). Her crew survived. |
| Muriel | United States | World War I: The fishing vessel was scuttled in the Atlantic Ocean 45 nautical miles (83 km) west by north of Seal Island by SM U-156 (Imperial German Navy). Her crew survived. |
| Rob Roy | United States | World War I: The fishing vessel was sunk in the Atlantic Ocean 35 nautical miles (65 km) east of Seal Island by SM U-156 (Imperial German Navy). Her crew survived. |
| Skjold | Denmark | World War I: The three-masted schooner was shelled and damaged in the North Sea off Lindesnes, Rogaland, Norway by SM UC-40 (Imperial German Navy) and was abandoned by her crew. The derelict vessel was sunk on 12 September by SM UB-125 (Imperial German Navy). |
| Sydney B. Atwood | United States | World War I: The ship was sunk in the Atlantic Ocean 30 nautical miles (56 km) off Seal Island by SM U-156 (Imperial German Navy). |
| SM UB-53 | Imperial German Navy | World War I: The Type UB III submarine struck two mines and sank in the Strait of Otranto (39°40′N 18°40′E) with the loss of ten of her crew. |
| Vouga | Portugal | World War I: The schooner was scuttled in the Atlantic Ocean north west of Spain (45°40′N 10°28′W by SM U-43 (Imperial German Navy). |
| HMAT Warilda | Royal Australian Navy | ( Red Cross): World War I: The hospital ship was torpedoed and sunk in the English Channel 32 nautical miles (59 km) south south west of the Owers Lightship (United Kingdom) (50°10′N 0°13′W) by SM UC-49 (Imperial German Navy) with the loss of 123 of the 801 people on board. |

== 4 August ==
List of shipwrecks: 4 August 1918
| Ship | State | Description |
|---|---|---|
| Clan Macnab | United Kingdom | World War I: The cargo ship was torpedoed and sunk in the Irish Sea 14 nautical miles (26 km) north north west of the Pendeen Lighthouse, Cornwall (50°20′N 5°55′W) by SM U-113 (Imperial German Navy) with the loss of 22 crew. |
| Don | Norway | World War I: The barque was sunk in the Atlantic Ocean 350 nautical miles (650 km) west of the Skellig Islands (50°44′N 16°21′W) by SM U-157 (Imperial German Navy). Her crew survived. |
| Hundvaagø | Norway | World War I: The cargo ship was torpedoed and sunk in the Bay of Biscay 2 nautical miles (3.7 km) off Groix, Finistère by SM UB-88 (Imperial German Navy) with the loss of three of her crew. |
| Nelson A. | United Kingdom | World War I: The schooner was scuttled in the Atlantic Ocean 25 nautical miles (46 km) south of Shelburne, Nova Scotia, Canada by SM U-156 (Imperial German Navy). Her crew survived. |
| O. B. Jennings | United States | World War I: The tanker was sunk in the Atlantic Ocean 100 nautical miles (190 km) off the coast of Virginia (36°40′N 73°58′W) by SM U-140 (Imperial German Navy) with the loss of two crew. One of the survivors was taken as a prisoner of war. |
| Reinhard | Russia | World War I: The schooner was shelled and sunk in the Irish Sea north east of Ireland (55°27′N 6°45′W) by SM U-96 (Imperial German Navy). |
| Remonstrant | Norway | World War I: The barque was sunk in the Atlantic Ocean 280 nautical miles (520 km) west of the Fastnet Rock (50°30′N 18°00′W) by SM U-157 (Imperial German Navy). Her crew survived. |
| USS SC-187 | United States Navy | The SC-1-class submarine chaser sank In a collision with Capto (Norway) 11 miles (18 km) northeast of Cape Charles Light Vessel. |

== 5 August ==
List of shipwrecks: 5 August 1918
| Ship | State | Description |
|---|---|---|
| Agnes G. Holland | United States | World War I: The trawler was sunk in the Atlantic Ocean by SM U-156 (Imperial German Navy). |
| Belaya Akatsiya | Soviet Navy Red Movement | Russian Civil War: The armed boat was run aground and abandoned on the Volga River during a battle with Czechoslovak Legion gunboats. |
| Burtak | Soviet Navy Red Movement | Russian Civil War: The armed boat was run aground and abandoned on the Volga River during a battle with Czechoslovak Legion gunboats. |
| Cornelia | United States | The lighter was beached on Deer Island, in the harbor at Boston, Massachusetts after a collision with USS Bell (United States Navy). Wreck sold and salvaged by new owners. |
| Freshfield | Canada | World War I: The cargo ship was torpedoed and sunk in the Mediterranean Sea 4 nautical miles (7.4 km) north east by north of Capo Colonna, Calabria, Italy by SM UC-25 (Imperial German Navy) with the loss of three of her crew. |
| Luz Blanca | Canada | World War I: The tanker was torpedoed and sunk in the Atlantic Ocean 35 nautical miles (65 km) off Halifax, Nova Scotia by SM U-156 (Imperial German Navy) with the loss of two of her crew. |
| Stanley M. Seaman | United States | World War I: The sailing vessel was scuttled in the Atlantic Ocean 110 nautical miles (200 km) east of Cape Hatteras, Virginia by SM U-140 (Imperial German Navy). Her crew survived. |

== 6 August ==
List of shipwrecks: 6 August 1918
| Ship | State | Description |
|---|---|---|
| Biruta | United Kingdom | World War I: The cargo ship was torpedoed and sunk in the English Channel 8 nautical miles (15 km) north west of Calais, France by an Imperial German Navy submarine with the loss of twelve of her crew. |
| Carpe | French Navy | The naval trawler was lost on this date. |
| Clan Macneil | United Kingdom | World War I: The cargo ship was torpedoed and sunk in the Mediterranean Sea 10 nautical miles (19 km) north of Alexandria, Egypt (31°21′N 29°47′E) by SM UC-34 (Imperial German Navy). Her crew survived. |
| HMS Comet | Royal Navy | The Acorn-class destroyer collided with another vessel and sank in the Mediterranean Sea. |
| Diamond Shoals Lightship | United States Lighthouse Service | World War I: The lightship was shelled and sunk in the Atlantic Ocean at Diamond Shoals by SM U-140 (Imperial German Navy). |
| Merak | United States | World War I: The cargo ship was shelled and sunk in the Atlantic Ocean at Diamond Shoals by SM U-140 (Imperial German Navy), or was wrecked on Diamond Shoals trying to avoid the attack. |
| Niagara Scow | Canada | An iron scow used in sand dredging grounded on a rock shoal above the Horseshoe Falls section of Niagara Falls. |
| Reliance | United States | The cargo ship sank off Colon, Panama. |

== 7 August ==
List of shipwrecks: 7 August 1918
| Ship | State | Description |
|---|---|---|
| Dupetit-Thouars | French Navy | World War I: The Gueydon-class cruiser was torpedoed and sunk in the Atlantic Ocean 400 nautical miles (740 km) west of Brest, Finistère by SM U-62 (Imperial German Navy). Her crew survived. |
| Highland Harry | United Kingdom | World War I: The cargo liner was torpedoed and sunk in the Atlantic Ocean 83 nautical miles (154 km) north by west of Eagle Island, County Mayo (55°28′N 11°15′W) by SM U-96 (Imperial German Navy) with the loss of 24 lives. |
| Lorna | Norway | World War I: The cargo ship was sunk in the Atlantic Ocean 300 nautical miles (560 km) west of Ouessant, Finistère (47°00′N 12°00′W) by SM U-62 (Imperial German Navy). Her crew survived. |

== 8 August ==
List of shipwrecks: 8 August 1918
| Ship | State | Description |
|---|---|---|
| Clan Macvey | United Kingdom | World War I: The cargo ship was torpedoed and sunk in the English Channel 0.5 nautical miles (930 m) off Anvil Point, Dorset by SM UB-57 (Imperial German Navy) with the loss of seven of her crew. |
| HMT Michael Clements | Royal Navy | The naval trawler was rammed and sunk in the English Channel off St. Catherine's Point, Isle of Wight by HMT John Cattling (Royal Navy). Her crew survived. |
| Sydland | Sweden | World War I: The cargo ship was sunk in the Atlantic Ocean 100 nautical miles (190 km) off the Nantucket Lightship (United States Coast Guard), (43°30′N 65°23′W), by SM U-156 (Imperial German Navy). Her crew survived. |
| SM UC-49 | Imperial German Navy | World War I: The Type UC II submarine was depth charged and sunk in the English Channel off Start Point, Cornwall, (50°20′N 3°30′W) United Kingdom by HMS Opossom (Royal Navy) with the loss of all 31 crew. |
| SMS V68 | Imperial German Navy | World War I: The V25-class destroyer struck a mine and sank in the North Sea off the coast of Belgium with the loss of eighteen of her crew. |

== 9 August ==
List of shipwrecks: 9 August 1918
| Ship | State | Description |
|---|---|---|
| Emma | Russia | World War I: The three-masted schooner was sunk in the Skagerrak 37 nautical miles (69 km) off Ryvingen, Rogaland, Norway (57°29′N 8°09′E) by SM UB-89 (Imperial German Navy). |
| Girola Ciolino | Italy | World War I: The sailing vessel was sunk in the Malta Channel (36°18′N 13°34′E) by SM UC-22 (Imperial German Navy). |
| Glenlee | United Kingdom | World War I: The cargo ship was torpedoed and sunk in the English Channel 4 nautical miles (7.4 km) east of the Owers Lightship (United Kingdom) by SM UB-57 (Imperial German Navy) with the loss of a crew member. |
| SMS M62 | Imperial German Navy | World War I: The Type 1916 minesweeper struck a mine and sank in the North Sea. |
| Orkney | Denmark | World War I: The barque was scuttled in the Atlantic Ocean west of Gibraltar (39°50′N 17°47′W) by SM U-157 (Imperial German Navy) with the loss of five crew. |

== 10 August ==
List of shipwrecks: 10 August 1918
| Ship | State | Description |
|---|---|---|
| Aleda May | United States | World War I: The fishing vessel was sunk in the Atlantic Ocean (41°45′N 67°10′W) by SM U-117 (Imperial German Navy). Her crew survived. |
| Cruiser | United States | World War I: The fishing vessel was sunk in the Atlantic Ocean (41°45′N 67°10′W) by SM U-117 (Imperial German Navy). Her crew survived. |
| Earl & Nettie | United States | World War I: The fishing vessel was sunk in the Atlantic Ocean (41°45′N 67°10′W) by SM U-117 (Imperial German Navy). Her crew survived. |
| Katie L. Palmer | United States | World War I: The fishing vessel was sunk in the Atlantic Ocean (41°45′N 67°10′W) by SM U-117 (Imperial German Navy). Her crew survived. |
| Madame Renee | United Kingdom | World War I: The coaster was torpedoed and sunk in the North Sea 1 nautical mile (1.9 km) north north east of Scarborough, Yorkshire by SM UB-30 (Imperial German Navy) with the loss of ten of her crew. |
| Mary E. Sennett | United States | World War I: The fishing vessel was sunk in the Atlantic Ocean (41°45′N 67°10′W) by SM U-117 (Imperial German Navy). Her crew survived. |
| Old Time | United States | The vessel was sunk in the Atlantic Ocean by SM U-117 (Imperial German Navy). |
| Patra | France | World War I: The sailing vessel was sunk in the Mediterranean Sea off the Egyptian coast by SM UC-34 (Imperial German Navy). |
| Polynesien | France | World War I: The troopship was torpedoed and sunk in the Mediterranean Sea 7 nautical miles (13 km) off Valletta, Malta by SM UC-22 (Imperial German Navy) with the loss of nineteen lives. |
| Progress | United States | World War I: The fishing vessel was sunk in the Atlantic Ocean (41°45′N 67°10′W) by SM U-117 (Imperial German Navy). Her crew survived. |
| Reliance | United States | World War I: The fishing vessel was sunk in the Atlantic Ocean (41°45′N 67°10′W) by SM U-117 (Imperial German Navy). Her crew survived. |
| Tatarrax | United Kingdom | World War I: The tanker was torpedoed and sunk in the Mediterranean Sea off Rosetta, Egypt (32°00′N 30°45′E) by SM UC-34 (Imperial German Navy) with the loss of 61 lives. |
| William H. Starbuck | United States | World War I: The fishing vessel was sunk in the Atlantic Ocean (41°45′N 67°10′W) by SM U-117 (Imperial German Navy). Her crew survived. |

== 11 August ==
List of shipwrecks: 11 August 1918
| Ship | State | Description |
|---|---|---|
| City of Adelaide | United Kingdom | World War I: The cargo ship was torpedoed and sunk in the Mediterranean Sea 60 nautical miles (110 km) east north east of Malta (36°26′N 15°37′E) by SM U-63 (Imperial German Navy) with the loss of four crew. |
| HM CMB-40 | Royal Navy | The Coastal Motor Boat was lost on this date. |
| HM CMB-42 | Royal Navy | The Coastal Motor Boat was lost on this date. |
| HM CMB-47 | Royal Navy | The Coastal Motor Boat was lost on this date. |
| Penistone | United Kingdom | World War I: The cargo ship was torpedoed and sunk in the Atlantic Ocean 145 nautical miles (269 km) south west of Nantucket, Massachusetts, United States (39°50′N 67°30′W) by SM U-156 (Imperial German Navy) with the loss of a crew member. |

== 12 August ==
List of shipwrecks: 12 August 1918
| Ship | State | Description |
|---|---|---|
| G6 | Regia Marina | World War I: The naval trawler was torpedoed and sunk in the Mediterranean Sea south east of Sicily by SM U-63 (Imperial German Navy). |
| Sommerstad | Norway | World War I: The cargo ship was sunk in the Atlantic Ocean 30 nautical miles (56 km) south east of the Fire Island Lightship (United States Coast Guard) (40°00′N 69°00′W) by SM U-117 (Imperial German Navy). Her crew survived. |

== 13 August ==
List of shipwrecks: 13 August 1918
| Ship | State | Description |
|---|---|---|
| Anhui | United Kingdom | World War I: The cargo ship was torpedoed and sunk in the Mediterranean Sea 2 nautical miles (3.7 km) south east of Capo Greco, Cyprus (35°04′N 34°08′E) by SM U-27 (Austro-Hungarian Navy) with the loss of four of her crew. |
| City of Brisbane | United Kingdom | World War I: The cargo ship was torpedoed and sunk in the English Channel 1.5 nautical miles (2.8 km) south of Newhaven, Sussex by SM UC-49 (Imperial German Navy). Her crew survived. |
| Etruria | Regia Marina | The Regioni-class cruiser was destroyed at Livorno by the explosion of an ammunition barge moored alongside her. |
| Frederic R. Kellogg | United States | World War I: The steamer was torpedoed and sunk in shallow water 12 miles (19 km) off Barnegat Light. Salvaged by the end of the Month. Seven crewmen were killed. |
| Frida | Denmark | World War I: The barque was shelled and sunk in the North Sea 40 nautical miles (74 km) east of the mouth of the River Tyne by SM UB-104 (Imperial German Navy) with the loss of seven of her crew. |
| Jönköping I | Sweden | World War I: The cargo ship was sunk in the North Sea off Robin Hood's Bay, Yorkshire, United Kingdom by SM UB-104 (Imperial German Navy). The ship broke in two, with the bow section sinking and the stern section being beached at South Shields, County Durham where it was scrapped in 1919. Five of her crew perished |
| La Chaussade | France | World War I: The cargo ship was sunk in the Mediterranean Sea off La Galite, Tunisia by SM UC-27 (Imperial German Navy) with the loss of four of her crew. |
| SMS T67 | Imperial German Navy | World War I: The S66-class torpedo boat struck a mine and sank in the North Sea with the loss of two of her crew. |
| SM UB-30 | Imperial German Navy | World War I: The Type UB II submarine was depth charged and sunk in the North Sea 3 nautical miles (5.6 km) north north east of Whitby, Yorkshire, United Kingdom (54°32′N 0°36′E) with the loss of all 26 crew. |

== 14 August ==
List of shipwrecks: 14 August 1918
| Ship | State | Description |
|---|---|---|
| Dorothy B. Barrett | United States | World War I: The five-masted schooner was shelled and sunk in the Atlantic Ocean 6.5 nautical miles (12.0 km) off the North East End Lightship (United States Coast Guard) (38°54′N 74°34′W) by SM U-117 (Imperial German Navy). Her crew survived. |
| SM UB-57 | Imperial German Navy | World War I: The Type UB III submarine struck a mine and sank in the North Sea off the Belgian coast and sank with the loss of all 34 crew. |
| SM UB-103 | Imperial German Navy | World War I: The Type UB III submarine departed Zeebrugge, West Flanders, Belgium on patrol. She subsequently struck a mine and sank with the loss of all 37 crew. |
| Wallsend | United Kingdom | World War I: The cargo ship was torpedoed and sunk in the North Sea 1 nautical mile (1.9 km) south east of Robin Hood's Bay, Yorkshire by SM UB-104 (Imperial German Navy). Her crew survived. |

== 15 August ==
List of shipwrecks: 15 August 1918
| Ship | State | Description |
|---|---|---|
| Balkan | France | World War I: The ship was torpedoed and sunk in the Mediterranean Sea. There were at least 102 survivors. |
| Cubore | United States | World War I: The cargo ship was torpedoed and sunk in the Atlantic Ocean 250 nautical miles (460 km) north west of Cape Finisterre, Spain (46°52′N 12°00′W) by SM U-107 (Imperial German Navy) with the loss of nine crew. |
| J. M. J. | France | World War I: The fishing vessel was sunk in the Atlantic Ocean west of Ouessant, Finistère by SM U-90 (Imperial German Navy). |
| Kalps | Russia | World War I: The sailing vessel was scuttled in the Atlantic Ocean off Lisbon, Portugal (37°57′N 18°27′W) by SM U-157 (Imperial German Navy). |
| Madrugada | United States | World War I: The four-masted auxiliary schooner was sunk in the Atlantic Ocean 35 nautical miles (65 km) off Norfolk, Virginia (37°50′N 74°55′W) by SM U-117 (Imperial German Navy). Her crew survived. |
| USAT Montanan | United States Army | World War I: The transport was torpedoed and sunk in the Atlantic Ocean 500 miles (800 km) off the coast of France by SM U-90 (Imperial German Navy) with the loss of five crew. |
| HMS Scott | Royal Navy | World War I: The Admiralty type destroyer leader struck a mine, from SM UC-71 (Imperial German Navy), and sank in the North Sea off IJmuiden, North Holland, Netherlands (52°24′N 3°51′E) with the loss of 22 of her crew. |
| HMS Ulleswater | Royal Navy | HMS Ulleswater World War I: The R-class destroyer struck a mine, from SM U-71 (Imperial German Navy), and sank in the North Sea off IJmuiden (52°24′N 3°51′E) with the loss of five of her crew. |

== 16 August ==
List of shipwrecks: 16 August 1918
| Ship | State | Description |
|---|---|---|
| SMS A58 | Imperial German Navy | World War I: The A56-class torpedo boat struck a mine and sank in the North Sea off the coast of Belgium with the loss of three of her crew. |
| Baikal | Soviet Navy | Russian Civil War: Battle of Lake Baikal: The auxiliary ferry/Icebreaker/gunboat was shelled and sunk by Czechoslovak Legion ships Sibirjak and Fedosia in Mysova Harbor on Lake Baikal. |
| Balkan | France | World War I: The troopship was torpedoed and sunk in the Mediterranean Sea 7 nautical miles (13 km) north west of Île Rousse, Corsica (42°40′N 8°39′E) by SM UB-48 (Imperial German Navy) with the loss of approximately 400 lives. |
| SMS Frigg | Imperial German Navy | The Vorpostenboot was lost on this date. |
| Mirlo | United Kingdom | World War I: The tanker was torpedoed and sunk in the Atlantic Ocean off Cape Hatteras, North Carolina, United States by SM U-117 (Imperial German Navy) with the loss of nine crew. |
| USS West Bridge | United States Navy | World War I: The cargo ship was torpedoed and severely damaged in the Bay of Biscay by SM U-90 (Imperial German Navy) with the loss of four of her crew. She was abandoned by the survivors but was later towed into Brest, Finistère, France. |

== 17 August ==
List of shipwrecks: 17 August 1918
| Ship | State | Description |
|---|---|---|
| Denebola | United Kingdom | World War I: The cargo ship was torpedoed and sunk in the Celtic Sea, 2 nautical miles (3.7 km) north west of Gurnard's Head, Cornwall (50°13′N 5°37′W) by SM UB-86 (Imperial German Navy) with the loss of two of her crew. |
| Eros | United Kingdom | World War I: The cargo ship was torpedoed and sunk in the North Sea 9 nautical miles (17 km) south east of Scarborough, Yorkshire by SM UB-113 (Imperial German Navy) with the loss of seven of her crew. |
| Escrick | United Kingdom | World War I: The cargo ship was torpedoed and sunk in the Atlantic Ocean 360 nautical miles (670 km) north west by north of Cape Finisterre, Spain (46°24′N 16°10′W) by SM U-90 (Imperial German Navy) with the loss of a crew member. Her captain was taken as a prisoner of war. |
| Helene | Denmark | World War I: The cargo ship was torpedoed and sunk in the Atlantic Ocean 6 nautical miles (11 km) north west by north of St Ives, Cornwall, United Kingdom (50°17′N 5°36′W) by SM UB-86 (Imperial German Navy) with the loss of a crew member. |
| Joseph Cudahy | United States | World War I: The tanker was sunk in the Atlantic Ocean 370 nautical miles (690 km) north west by north of Cape Finisterre (46°35′N 13°54′W) by SM U-90 (Imperial German Navy) with the loss of a crew member. |
| Moghrab | Belgium | The tanker was wrecked in Poro Bay, Crete by the explosion of petrol from Monastir (France), which she was involved in salvaging. |
| Nordhav | Norway | World War I: The four-masted barque was sunk in the Atlantic Ocean 120 nautical miles (220 km) north east of Cape Henry, Virginia, United States by SM U-117 (Imperial German Navy). Her crew survived. |
| San Jose | Norway | World War I: The cargo ship was sunk in the Atlantic Ocean (42°10′N 64°42′W) by SM U-156 (Imperial German Navy). Her crew survived. |

== 18 August ==
List of shipwrecks: 18 August 1918
| Ship | State | Description |
|---|---|---|
| Idaho | United Kingdom | World War I: The cargo ship was torpedoed and sunk in the Atlantic Ocean 120 nautical miles (220 km) north by west of Cape Villano, Spain by SM U-107 (Imperial German Navy) with the loss of eleven crew. |
| USAT Montanan | United States Army | USAT Montanan World War I: The cargo ship was torpedoed and sunk in the Atlantic Ocean 500 nautical miles (930 km) west of Le Verdon-sur-Mer, Gironde, France (46°47′N 13°42′W) by SM U-90 (Imperial German Navy) with the loss of five of the 86 people on board. Survivors were rescued by USS Moma (United States Navy). |
| Nordboen | Denmark | World War I: The cargo ship was scuttled in the Mediterranean Sea 30 nautical miles (56 km) off Palamos, Spain (41°20′N 3°48′E) by SM UB-48 (Imperial German Navy). Her crew survived. |

== 19 August ==
List of shipwrecks: 19 August 1918
| Ship | State | Description |
|---|---|---|
| Buoni Amici | Kingdom of Italy | World War I: The sailing vessel was scuttled in the Atlantic Ocean 45 nautical miles (83 km) off Viana do Castelo by SM U-22 (Imperial German Navy). |
| Marie Suzanne | United Kingdom | World War I: The collier was torpedoed and sunk in the Aegean Sea 47 nautical miles (87 km) south west of Mudros, Greece by SM UC-37 (Imperial German Navy). Her crew survived. |
| Proteus | United States | The cargo-Liner was sunk in a collision with Tanker Cushing (United States) in dense fog 34 miles south west of Diamond Shoals. 1 crew drowned when he jumped overboard at time of the collision. 94 rescued by Cushing. |
| SM UB-12 | Imperial German Navy | World War I: The Type UB I submarine departed from Zeebrugge, West Flanders, Belgium on patrol. No further trace, lost with all fourteen crew. |
| Zinal | United Kingdom | World War I: The cargo ship was torpedoed and sunk in the Atlantic Ocean 360 nautical miles (670 km) north by east of Terceira, Azores, Portugal by SM UB-109 (Imperial German Navy) with the loss of two of her crew. |

== 20 August ==
List of shipwrecks: 20 August 1918
| Ship | State | Description |
|---|---|---|
| A. Piatt Andrew | United States | World War I: The schooner was sunk in the Atlantic Ocean 60 nautical miles (110 km) off the coast of Nova Scotia, Canada by Triumph (Imperial German Navy). Her crew survived. |
| Boltonhall | United Kingdom | World War I: The cargo ship was torpedoed and sunk in the Irish Sea 34 nautical miles (63 km) south west by west of Bardsey Island, Pembrokeshire by SM UB-92 (Imperial German Navy) with the loss of fiver of her crew. |
| Frances J. O'Hara Jr. | United States | World War I: The schooner was sunk in the Atlantic Ocean 60 nautical miles (110 km) off the coast of Nova Scotia by Triumph (Imperial German Navy). Her crew survived. |
| Gasconier | Belgium | World War I: The cargo ship struck a mine in the North Sea off Udsire, Rogaland, Norway and sank. |
| Kite | United Kingdom | The cargo ship came ashore at Cape Rosie, Newfoundland and was a total loss. |
| Lucille M. Schnare | Canada | World War I: The schooner was scuttled in the Atlantic Ocean 52 nautical miles (96 km) south of Cape Canso, Nova Scotia by Triumph (Imperial German Navy). Her crew survived. |
| Magalhaes Lima | Portugal | World War I: The trawler was scuttled in the Atlantic Ocean 13 nautical miles (24 km) off Nazaré by SM U-22 (Imperial German Navy). |
| Otis Tetrax | United Kingdom | World War I: The cargo ship was torpedoed and sunk in the North Sea 28 nautical miles (52 km) south of Flamborough Head, Yorkshire by a Kaiserliche Marine submarine. |
| Pasadena | Canada | World War I: The schooner was scuttled in the Atlantic Ocean 70 nautical miles (130 km) south south east of Cape Canso by SM U-156 (Imperial German Navy). Her crew survived. |
| HMT Strathmore | Royal Navy | The naval trawler was lost on this date. |
| Uda A. Saunders | Canada | World War I: The schooner was scuttled in the Atlantic Ocean 60 nautical miles (110 km) south of Cape Canso by Triumph (Imperial German Navy). Her crew survived. |

== 21 August ==
List of shipwrecks: 21 August 1918
| Ship | State | Description |
|---|---|---|
| Boscawen | United Kingdom | World War I: The collier was shelled and sunk in the Irish Sea 23 nautical miles (43 km) west north west of Bardsey Island, Pembrokeshire (52°46′N 5°24′W) by SM UB-92 (Imperial German Navy) with the loss of a crew member. |
| Champlain | France | World War I: The cargo liner was torpedoed and sunk in the Atlantic Ocean 124 nautical miles (230 km) west of Cape Mondego, Portugal (40°10′N 11°42′W) by SM UB-128 (Imperial German Navy). Her crew survived, but her captain was taken as a prisoner of war. |
| Diomed | United Kingdom | World War I: The cargo ship was shelled and sunk in the Atlantic Ocean 195 nautical miles (361 km) east south east of Nantucket, Massachusetts, United States by SM U-140 (Imperial German Navy) with the loss of two crew. |
| Hecla | Norway | World War I: The barge was shelled and sunk in the North Sea 102 nautical miles (189 km) east north east of Coquet Island, Northumberland, United Kingdom by SM UC-59 (Imperial German Navy). Her crew survived. |
| Lake Edon | United States | World War I: The cargo ship was torpedoed and sunk in the Atlantic Ocean 4 nautical miles (7.4 km) north by east of Newquay, Cornwall, United Kingdom (50°27′33″N 5°07′34″W) by SM U-107 (Imperial German Navy) with the loss of sixteen crew. |
| Loeke | Norway | World War I: The tug was shelled and sunk in the North Sea 102 nautical miles (189 km) east north east of Coquet Island by SM UC-59 (Imperial German Navy). Her crew survived. |
| Maggie Todd | United States | The schooner sank 150 miles (240 km) north west of Tampa, Florida. |
| USS Montauk | United States Navy | The naval trawler was driven ashore in a gale and sunk off Cumberland Island, Georgia, about 20 miles (32 km) from Fernandina, Florida. Nine crew killed. |
| Sylvania | United States | World War I: The schooner was scuttled in the Atlantic Ocean 90 nautical miles (170 km) south east of Cape Canso, Nova Scotia, Canada by Triumph (Imperial German Navy). Her crew survived. |
| The Stewart's Court | United Kingdom | World War I: The coaster was torpedoed and sunk in the North Sea 4 nautical miles (7.4 km) south south east of Seaham, County Durham by SM UB-112 (Imperial German Navy) with the loss of a crew member. |

== 22 August ==
List of shipwrecks: 22 August 1918
| Ship | State | Description |
|---|---|---|
| Abbasieh | Egypt | World War I: The sailing vessel was shelled and sunk in the Mediterranean Sea by an enemy submarine. |
| Maria Luisa | Portugal | World War I: The schooner was sunk in the Atlantic Ocean off the coast of Portugal by SM U-22 (Imperial German Navy). |
| HMML 403 | Royal Navy | World War I: The motor launch was sunk off the coast of Whitby, whilst recovering a German torpedo that had been fired the previous day at a steamer and had failed to detonate. The torpedo was brought on board when it exploded, killing 11 of the 12 crew. |
| Notre Dame de la Garde | France | World War I: The topsail schooner was scuttled in the Atlantic Ocean 90 nautical miles (170 km) off Sydney, Nova Scotia, Canada (45°32′N 58°57′W) by Triumph and SM U-156 (both Imperial German Navy). Her crew survived. |
| Nurnberg | Imperial German Navy | The Vorpostenboot was lost on this date. |
| Palmella | United Kingdom | World War I: The cargo ship was torpedoed and sunk in the Irish Sea 25 nautical miles (46 km) north west of South Stack (53°28′N 5°20′W) by SM UB-92 (Imperial German Navy) with the loss of 28 of her crew. |
| Prunelle | United Kingdom | World War I: The coaster was torpedoed and sunk in the North Sea 2 nautical miles (3.7 km) south east of Blyth, Northumberland by SM UB-112 (Imperial German Navy) with the loss of twelve of her crew. |

== 23 August ==
List of shipwrecks: 23 August 1918
| Ship | State | Description |
|---|---|---|
| SMS A19 | Imperial German Navy | World War I: The A1-class torpedo boat was shelled and sunk in the North Sea off the coast of Belgium by Royal Navy destroyers with the loss of nineteen of her crew. |
| Australian Transport | United Kingdom | World War I: The cargo ship was torpedoed and sunk in the Strait of Sicily (40 nautical miles (74 km)) west north west of Maritimo Island, Italy (38°08′N 11°10′E) by SM UC-27 (Imperial German Navy) with the loss of a crew member. |
| Heros | Sweden | World War I: The coaster was sunk in the North Sea 6 nautical miles (11 km) south of Warkworth, Northumberland, United Kingdom by SM UB-112 (Imperial German Navy) with the loss of two of her crew. |
| HMT Tulip II or Tulip II | Royal Navy or United Kingdom | The 85-foot (26 m), 88-ton steam drifter or naval drifter was lost in a collision off Falmouth, Cornwall. |

== 24 August ==
List of shipwrecks: 24 August 1918
| Ship | State | Description |
|---|---|---|
| Auckland Castle | United Kingdom | World War I: The cargo ship was torpedoed and sunk in the North Sea 5 nautical miles (9.3 km) east by south of the Farne Islands, Northumberland by SM UC-59 (Imperial German Navy) with the loss of twelve of her crew. |
| Flavia | United Kingdom | World War I: The passenger ship was torpedoed and sunk in the Atlantic Ocean 30 nautical miles (56 km) north west by west of Tory Island, County Donegal (55°23′N 9°40′W) by SM U-107 (Imperial German Navy) with the loss of one life. |
| George Hudson | United States | The fishing steamer sank after going ashore in fog on Watch Hill Reef, Watch Hill, Rhode Island. The wreck was later removed. |
| Graciosa | Portugal | World War I: The four-masted barque was shelled and sunk in the Atlantic Ocean north west of Scotland (59°06′N 5°00′W) by SM U-67 and SM U-90 (both Imperial German Navy). Her crew survived. |
| Hollandia | Netherlands | World War I: The fishing vessel was scuttled in the North Sea off the coast of Norfolk, United Kingdom by SM UB-111 (Imperial German Navy). Her crew survived. |
| Lisbonense | Portugal | The cargo ship struck a floating object and sank in the Mediterranean Sea 40 nautical miles (74 km) off the Sisargas Islands, Spain. Fourteen crew were rescued. |
| Majoor Thompson | Netherlands | World War I: The fishing vessel was scuttled in the North Sea off the coast of Norfolk by SM UB-111 (Imperial German Navy). Her crew survived. |
| Maria Johanna | Netherlands | World War I: The fishing vessel was scuttled in the North Sea off the coast of Norfolk by SM UB-111 (Imperial German Navy). Her crew survived. |
| Neerlandia II | Netherlands | World War I: The fishing vessel was scuttled in the North Sea off the coast of Norfolk by SM UB-111 (Imperial German Navy). Her crew survived. |
| Neerlandia III | Netherlands | World War I: The fishing vessel was scuttled in the North Sea off the coast of Norfolk by SM UB-111 (Imperial German Navy). Her crew survived. |
| Secunda | Netherlands | World War I: The fishing vessel was sunk in the North Sea off the coast of Norfolk by SM UB-111 (Imperial German Navy). |
| Stella | Netherlands | World War I: The fishing vessel was scuttled in the North Sea off the coast of Norfolk by SM UB-111 (Imperial German Navy). Her crew survived. |
| Virent | United Kingdom | World War I: The cargo ship was torpedoed and sunk in the Atlantic Ocean 38 nautical miles (70 km) off the Smalls Lighthouse by SM UB-92 (Imperial German Navy). Her crew survived. |

== 25 August ==
List of shipwrecks: 25 August 1918
| Ship | State | Description |
|---|---|---|
| Carasa | Spain | World War I: The cargo ship was torpedoed and sunk in the Atlantic Ocean 4 nautical miles (7.4 km) north of Towan Head, Cornwall, United Kingdom (50°29′N 5°07′W) by SM UB-92 (Imperial German Navy) with the loss of six of her crew. |
| Clayton W. Walters | Canada | World War I: The schooner was scuttled in the Atlantic Ocean 35 nautical miles (65 km) west south west of Saint-Pierre and Miquelon by SM U-156 (Imperial German Navy). Her crew survived. |
| C. M. Walters | Canada | World War I: The schooner was scuttled in the Atlantic Ocean 35 nautical miles (65 km) west of Langlade Island, Saint-Pierre and Miquelon by SM U-156 (Imperial German Navy). Her crew survived. |
| E. B. Walters | Canada | World War I: The schooner was scuttled in the Atlantic Ocean 35 nautical miles (65 km) west of Langlade Island by SM U-156 (Imperial German Navy). Her crew survived. |
| Erik | United Kingdom | World War I: The coaster was scuttled in the Atlantic Ocean 70 nautical miles (130 km) north west by west of Saint-Pierre and Miquelon by SM U-156 (Imperial German Navy). Her crew survived. |
| J. J. Flaherty | United States | World War I: The schooner was sunk in the Atlantic Ocean 35 nautical miles (65 km) west south west of Saint-Pierre and Miquelon by SM U-156 (Imperial German Navy). Her crew survived. |
| Marion Adams | Canada | World War I: The fishing vessel was scuttled in the Atlantic Ocean off Saint-Pierre and Miquelon by SM U-156 (Imperial German Navy). Her crew survived. |
| Pontet Canet | France | World War I: The cargo ship was sunk in the English Channel 12 nautical miles (22 km) north north west of the Héaux de Bréhat Lighthouse, Côtes-du-Nord (49°07′N 3°05′W) by SM UB-109 (Imperial German Navy). |
| Triumph | Imperial German Navy | The captured trawler was scuttled on or after this date. |
| Verna D. Adams | Canada | World War I: The schooner was scuttled in the Atlantic Ocean 35 nautical miles (65 km) west south west of Saint-Pierre and Miquelon by Triumph (Imperial German Navy). Her crew survived. |
| Willingtonia | United Kingdom | World War I: The cargo ship was torpedoed and sunk in the Strait of Sicily 13 nautical miles (24 km) south west by west of Maritimo Island, Italy (37°49′N 11°10′E) by SM UC-27 (Imperial German Navy) with the loss of four of her crew. |

== 26 August ==
List of shipwrecks: 26 August 1918
| Ship | State | Description |
|---|---|---|
| Evangtelistria | Greece | World War I: The sailing vessel was sunk in the Aegean Sea (39°11′N 25°15′E) by SM UC-37 (Imperial German Navy). |
| Gloaming | Canada | World War I: The schooner was scuttled in the Atlantic Ocean 70 nautical miles (130 km) south south west of Saint-Pierre and Miquelon by SM U-156 (Imperial German Navy). Her crew survived. |
| Helge | Sweden | World War I: The cargo ship was torpedoed and sunk in the English Channel off Saint-Brieuc, Côtes du Nord, France (48°49′N 2°45′W by SM UB-109 (Imperial German Navy) with the loss of thirteen of her crew. |
| Rush | United States | World War I: The steam trawler was scuttled in the Atlantic Ocean 135 nautical miles (250 km) south east of Cape Canso, Nova Scotia, Canada (44°30′N 58°02′W) by SM U-117 (Imperial German Navy). Her crew survived. |

== 27 August ==
List of shipwrecks: 27 August 1918
| Ship | State | Description |
|---|---|---|
| Ant Cassar | United Kingdom | World War I: The cargo ship was torpedoed and sunk in the Atlantic Ocean 30 nautical miles (56 km) north north west of Strumble Head, Cornwall (52°25′N 5°45′W) by SM UB-118 (Imperial German Navy). Her crew survived. |
| Bergsdalen | Norway | World War I: The cargo ship was sunk in the Atlantic Ocean (45°10′N 55°10′W) by SM U-117 (Imperial German Navy) with the loss of a crew member. |
| Gloria | Portugal | World War I: The schooner was scuttled in the Atlantic Ocean 30 nautical miles (56 km) off Porto Santo Island, Madeira (33°24′N 16°28′W) by SM U-157 (Imperial German Navy). Her crew survived. |
| Pampa | France | World War I: The troopship was sunk in the Mediterranean Sea 84 nautical miles (156 km) east of Valletta, Malta by SM UC-22 (Imperial German Navy) with the loss of 117 lives. |
| USS SC-209 | United States Navy | World War I: The SC-1-class submarine chaser was sunk by gunfire by the American steam cargo ship Felix Taussig (United States), in the Atlantic Ocean south of Long Island, New York, and east of New Jersey after Felix Taussig mistook her for an Imperial German Navy submarine. Two 3-inch (76.2 mm) shells hit SC-209, setting her on fire and sinking her in three minutes at 40°08′N 073°12′W. Eighteen members of SC-209′s crew died. The submarine chaser USS SC-188 (United States Navy) rescued her five survivors, four of whom were wounded. It was the deadliest friendly fire incident involving the U.S. Navy during World War I. |

== 28 August ==
List of shipwrecks: 28 August 1918
| Ship | State | Description |
|---|---|---|
| Emilia G. | Italy | World War I: The sailing vessel was scuttled in the Mediterranean Sea off Cape Palos, Spain (37°30′N 0°35′W) by SM U-34 (Imperial German Navy). |
| Giralda | United Kingdom | World War I: The cargo ship was torpedoed and damaged in the North Sea 5 nautical miles (9.3 km) north north west of Whitby, Yorkshire by SM UC-70 (Imperial German Navy) with the loss of six of her crew. She was beached but was consequently declared a total loss. |
| Johanne | Denmark | World War I: The schooner was scuttled in the Mediterranean Sea off Cartagena, Spain (37°13′N 0°55′W) by SM U-34 (Imperial German Navy). Her crew survived. |
| Mount Carmel | United Kingdom | The cargo ship struck a submerged wreck and sank. Her crew were rescued. |
| Pauline | Russia | World War I: The schooner was shelled and sunk in the Atlantic Ocean (47°50′N 9°55′W) by SM U-53 (Imperial German Navy). |
| SM UC-70 | Imperial German Navy | World War I: The Type UC II submarine was depth charged and sunk in the North Sea (54°32′N 0°40′W) by HMS Ouse (Royal Navy) with the loss of all 31 crew. |

== 29 August ==
List of shipwrecks: 29 August 1918
| Ship | State | Description |
|---|---|---|
| Atxeri Mendi | Spain | World War I: The cargo ship was sunk in the Atlantic Ocean 4 nautical miles (7.4 km) south east of the Tuskar Rock, Ireland by SM UB-125 (Imperial German Navy). |
| Gilbert | Sweden | World War I: The 100.5-foot (30.6 m), 149-ton steam trawler struck a mine off Marstrand in Kattegat and sank with the loss of all ten crew. |
| HMT Guide Me II | Royal Navy | The naval trawler collided with another vessel and sank in the Irish Sea off Dún Laoghaire, County Dublin. |
| HMT Puruni | Royal Navy | The naval trawler sank in the Caribbean Sea off Mayreau, St. Vincent and the Grenadines. |
| SM UB-109 | Imperial German Navy | World War I: The Type UB III submarine struck a mine and sank in the Strait of Dover (51°03′N 1°44′E) with the loss of 28 of her 36 crew. |

== 30 August ==
List of shipwrecks: 30 August 1918
| Ship | State | Description |
|---|---|---|
| Elsie Porter | United Kingdom | World War I: The schooner was scuttled in the Atlantic Ocean 290 nautical miles (540 km) east of St. John's, Newfoundland by SM U-117 (Imperial German Navy). Her crew survived. |
| HMS Endymion | Royal Navy | World War I: The Edgar-class cruiser was damaged at Stavros, Greece by SM UC-37 (Imperial German Navy). Her crew survived. |
| Onega | United States | World War I: The cargo ship was torpedoed and sunk in the Atlantic Ocean off the Godrevy Lighthouse, Cornwall, United Kingdom (50°17′N 5°22′W) by SM UB-125 (Imperial German Navy) with the loss of 26 of her crew. |
| Potentate | United Kingdom | World War I: The sailing vessel was scuttled in the Atlantic Ocean 290 nautical miles (540 km) east of St. John's, Newfoundland by SM U-117 (Imperial German Navy). |

== 31 August ==
List of shipwrecks: 31 August 1918
| Ship | State | Description |
|---|---|---|
| Gamo | Portugal | World War I: The schooner was scuttled in the Atlantic Ocean 370 nautical miles (690 km) off Flores Islands, Azores by SM U-155 (Imperial German Navy). |
| Milwaukee | United Kingdom | World War I: The cargo ship was torpedoed and sunk in the Atlantic Ocean 260 nautical miles (480 km) south west of the Fastnet Rock (47°22′N 12°14′W) by SM U-105 (Imperial German Navy) with the loss of a crew member. |
| Norte | Portugal | World War I: The trawler was scuttled in the Atlantic Ocean 30 nautical miles (56 km) off Safi, Morocco by SM U-22 (Imperial German Navy). |

== Unknown date ==
List of shipwrecks: Unknown date 1918
| Ship | State | Description |
|---|---|---|
| Bansei Maru No.2 | Japan | The cargo ship was lost on or after 28 August, She was on a voyage from Moji to Hong Kong. |
| Seguranca | United States | The steamer sprung a leak and was beached between 1 and 3 August on the south east coast of Sardinia but sank. |
