= SMS Triumph =

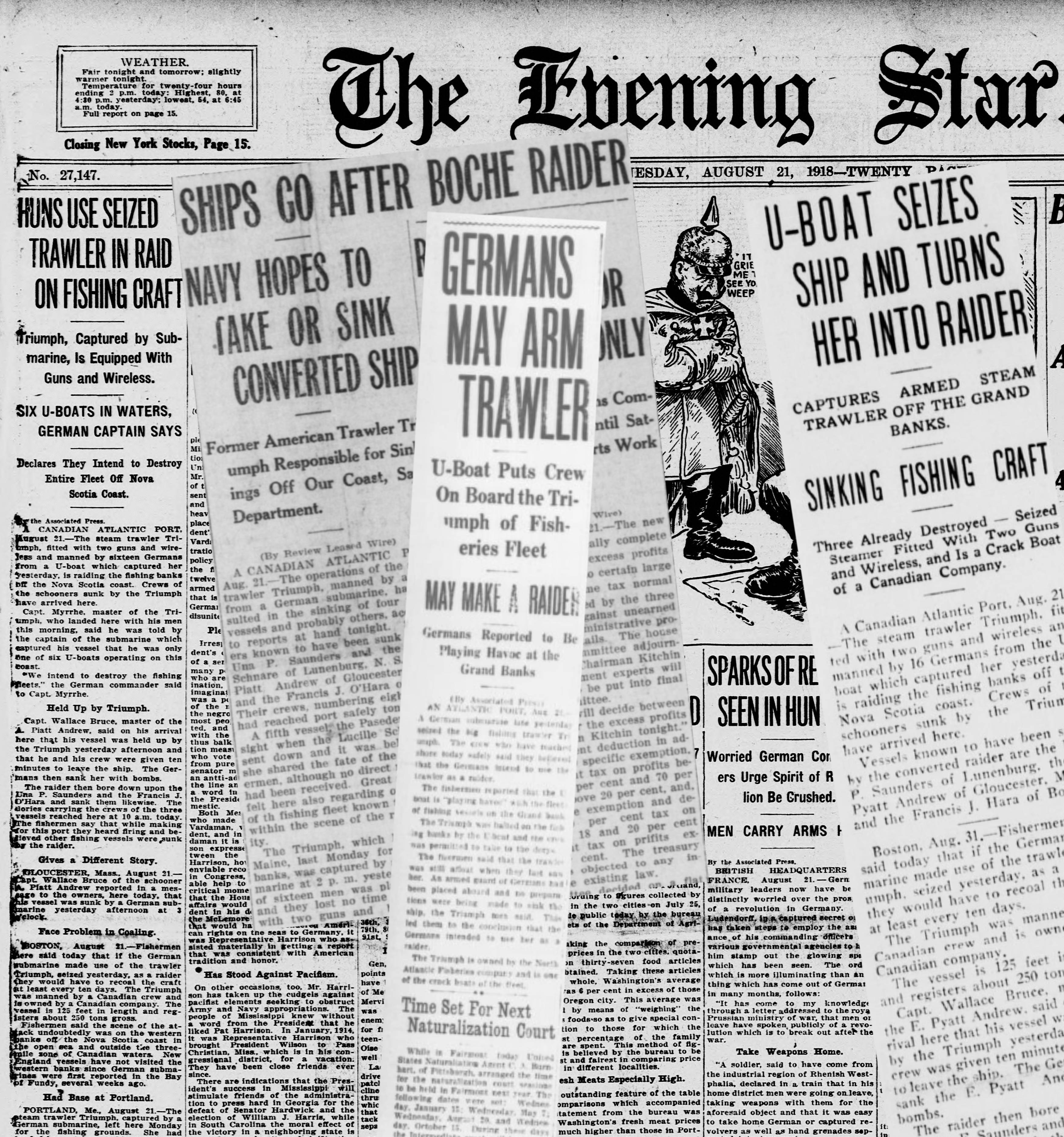
- August 1918, American media coverage of the German raider Triumph

History

Canada
- Name: Triumph
- Owner: E. Kendall, Halifax
- Builder: Charlton & Doughty, Grimsby
- Launched: 1907
- In service: 1907
- Out of service: 1918
- Fate: Seized by SM U-156 on 20 August 1918

German Empire
- Name: SMS Triumph
- Acquired: 20 August 1918
- Commissioned: 20 August 1918
- Fate: Scuttled 25 August 1918

General characteristics
- Displacement: 239 tons
- Complement: 11 Canadian crew; 15 German prize crew
- Armament: 2 × rapid-fire three-pounder deck guns, 25 x explosive demolition bombs equipped with timers, 2 x crates of three-pounder shells, and assorted small arms for the German boarding party.

SMS Triumph was a Canadian motorized stern trawler that was captured by the Imperial German Navy U-boat U-156 in 1918. The Nova Scotia newspaper The Sydney Record called the German-crewed Triumph a "Hun Sea Wolf!" Over the course of a few days it sank several fishing vessels before itself being scuttled on 25 August 1918.

== German raider ==
Under Captain Myrrhe the trawler left Portland, Maine on 17 August 1918 to fish the Middle Bank about 30 miles (48 km) south southeast of Canso, Nova Scotia. On 20 August 1918 she had her nets out making it difficult to maneuver when the Imperial German Navy U-boat U-156 surfaced next to and captured the Canadian vessel. It took only 25 minutes after the sub surfaced to seize the ship, arm it and man it with a 15-person German prize crew.

The Canadian crew was made prisoner and forced into confinement aboard U-156. The Triumph's steward later recounted for the Kennebec Journal, "The Germans were so polite that it started getting on our nerves. They offered us brandy and cigarettes while they used our trawler to blow up fishing boats all around the Bay of Fundy." The trawler then spent the next few days raiding off the Canadian coast sinking six ships in the Grand Banks area. Triumph was a familiar sight on the coast so when it approached the fishing vessels they were not alarmed and did not try to run.

The captain of Francis J. O'Hara Jr. told U.S. Navy officials that when Triumph initially told his ship to prepare to be boarded he thought it was a joke and ignored it. The perception was shattered when machine guns on Triumph fired in front of the American's bow. The Canadian crew were eventually forced from U-156 onto another captured fishing vessel and ordered to return to land.

== Summary of raiding history ==
Date	Name	Nationality	Tonnage (Note: Merchant ship tonnages are in gross register tons. Military vessels are listed by tons displacement.)	Fate
20 August 1918	A. Piatt Andrew	United States	141	Sunk
20 August 1918	Francis J. O'hara, Jr.	United States	117	Sunk
20 August 1918	Lucille M. Schnare	Canada	121	Sunk
20 August 1918	Pasadena	Canada	119	Sunk
21 August 1918	Sylvania	United States	136	Sunk
22 August 1918	Notre Dame De La Garde	France	147	Sunk
