= SM U-156 =

WW1 German submarine

History

German Empire
- Name: U-156
- Ordered: 29 November 1916
- Builder: Atlas Werke, Bremen
- Yard number: 382
- Launched: 17 April 1917
- Commissioned: 22 August 1917
- Fate: Sunk in the Northern Barrage minefield on 25 September 1918. 77 dead.

General characteristics
- Class & type: Type U 151 submarine
- Displacement: 1,512 tonnes (1,488 long tons) (surfaced); 1,875 tonnes (1,845 long tons) (submerged); 2,272 tonnes (2,236 long tons) (total)
- Length: 65.00 m (213 ft 3 in) (o/a); 57.00 m (187 ft) (pressure hull)
- Beam: 8.90 m (29 ft 2 in) (o/a); 5.80 m (19 ft) (pressure hull)
- Height: 9.25 m (30 ft 4 in)
- Draught: 5.30 m (17 ft 5 in)
- Installed power: 800 PS (590 kW; 790 bhp) (surfaced); 800 PS (590 kW; 790 bhp) (submerged)
- Propulsion: 2 × shafts, 2 × 1.60 m (5 ft 3 in) propellers
- Speed: 12.4 knots (23.0 km/h; 14.3 mph) surfaced; 5.2 knots (9.6 km/h; 6.0 mph) submerged
- Range: 25,000 nmi (46,000 km; 29,000 mi) at 5.5 knots (10.2 km/h; 6.3 mph) surfaced, 65 nmi (120 km; 75 mi) at 3 knots (5.6 km/h; 3.5 mph) submerged
- Test depth: 50 metres (160 ft)
- Complement: 6 officers, 50 enlisted, 20 prize crew, 1 additional officer in training on 2nd cruise
- Armament: 2 50 cm (20 in) bow torpedo tubes; 18 torpedoes; 2 × 15 cm (5.9 in) SK L/45 deck guns with 1672 rounds; 2 × 8.8 cm (3.5 in) SK L/30 deck guns with 764 rounds

Service record
- Part of: U-Kreuzer Flotilla; 28 August 1917 – 25 September 1918
- Commanders: Kptlt. Konrad Gansser; 22 August 1917 – 15 June 1918; Kptlt. Richard Feldt; 16 June – 25 September 1918
- Operations: 2 patrols
- Victories: 44 merchant ships sunk (50,471 GRT); 1 warship sunk (13,680 tons); 2 merchant ships damaged (638 GRT)

SM U-156 (Note: "SM" stands for "Seiner Majestät" (English: His Majesty's) and combined with the U for Unterseeboot would be translated as His Majesty's Submarine.) was a German Type U 151 U-boat commissioned in 1917 for the Imperial German Navy. From 1917 until her disappearance in September 1918 she was part of the U-Kreuzer Flotilla, and was responsible for sinking 45 ships and damaging two others. She is best known for her attack on Orleans, Massachusetts, the only time during the war that the American mainland was hit by enemy fire.

== Background ==
U-156, built by the Atlas Werke in Bremen, was originally one of seven Deutschland class U-boats designed to carry cargo between the United States and Germany in 1916. Five of the submarine freighters were converted into long-range cruiser U-boats (U-kreuzers) equipped with two 15 cm (5.9 in) SK L/45 deck guns, including U-156. They were the largest U-boats of World War I.

== Service history ==
U-156 was launched on 17 April 1917 and commissioned on 22 August 1917 under the experienced U-boat ace Konrad Gansser, who commanded her until June 1918, following which Richard Feldt took command until the U-156 was lost in September 1918.

On 17 January 1918, U-156 entered isolated Naos Bay in the Spanish Canary Islands. She was scheduled to meet with sister U-157 and a small Spanish flagged merchant vessel in an attempt to transit prohibited materials past the British blockade to Germany. The British learned of the meeting through decoded signals and ambushed the U-156 in a failed attempt to sink her. The British submarine HMS E48 actually hit the U-156 with a torpedo but the torpedo had failed to explode.

On 15 June 1918, U-156 sailed with 77 crew. She passed through the North Sea, negotiated the Northern Passage around the northern end of the British Isles, and out into the Atlantic Ocean where she sailed for Long Island. She then proceeded to New York Harbor, where she had been ordered to lay mines. Records show that she was to lay a field of mines in the shipping lane along the south shore of Long Island, just east of the Fire Island lightship.

On 8 July 1918 U-156 stopped and scuttled the Norwegian owned Manx King at 40°05′N 52°00′W, which was traveling between New York and Rio de Janeiro. Captain Rasmus Emil Halvorsen and her crew were rescued from the lifeboats after 27 hours by DS Anchites of Liverpool, England.

A mine laid by U-156 is often credited with the loss of the cruiser USS San Diego on 19 July 1918, ten miles southeast of Fire Island, New York.

On 21 July 1918 U-156 opened fire on a beach and marsh within the boundaries of the American town of Orleans, Massachusetts, and several nearby merchant vessels. The bombardment of the beach may have been a case of overshooting the targeted maritime vessels. In the end, U-156 severely damaged a tugboat and sank four barges. HS-1L flying boats and R-9 seaplanes were dispatched from the Chatham Naval Air Station and bombed the enemy raider with bombs that failed to explode, through either mechanical failure or lack of experience on their bombardiers. U-156 returned fire with her deck guns in an unsuccessful attempt to down the aircraft. It was the first time in history that American aviators engaged an enemy vessel in the western Atlantic. The Attack on Orleans was the only Central Powers raid mounted against the United States mainland during World War I and the first time the Continental United States was shelled by a foreign power's artillery since the Siege of Fort Texas in 1846.

U-156 had meanwhile headed north to attack the US fishing fleet. She sank 21 fishing boats in the Gulf of Maine area, from Cape Cod to the Bay of Fundy, ranging from the 72 GRT ton schooner Nelson A. (4 August) to the 766 GRT Dornfontein (2 August).

U-156 was credited with the sinking of the tanker Luz Blanca, just off the headlands of Halifax on August 5/1918. On 20 August, U-156 captured the Canadian trawler Triumph southwest of Canso, Nova Scotia. They manned and armed the vessel, and used it in conjunction with the submarine to capture and sink seven other fishing boats in the Grand Banks area, before eventually scuttling her.

On 21 August, U-156 was about to attack some fishing boats off Nova Scotia when HMCS Hochelaga which escorted 4 ships intervened. However, Hochelaga 's skipper, Lieutenant R.D. Legate, ordered his ship to turn around towards the ships escorted, instead of attacking the submarine. Back in port he was arrested, court marshaled and dishonorable discharged from the navy.

== Fate ==
On 25 September 1918 and in the following days, U-156 failed to report that she had cleared the Northern barrage minefield between the United Kingdom and Norway on her return voyage to Germany. U-156 is presumed to have struck a mine of the Northern Barrage during the last leg of her cruise. Prior to her arrival at the northern end of the barrage she had radioed the estimated time and exact route she planned to take through the mines. The British intercepted this message, decoded it, and sent a submarine to ambush U-156. U-156 escaped the trap by diving but likely attempted to transit the barrage while underwater. The 77 crew on board were never heard from again.

== Summary of raiding history ==
Date	Name	Nationality	Tonnage (Note: Merchant ship tonnages are in gross register tons. Military vessels are listed by tons displacement.)	Fate
7 December 1917	W.c. Mc Kay	Canada	147	Sunk
15 December 1917	Ioannina	Greece	4,567	Sunk
17 December 1917	Acoriano	Portugal	312	Sunk
30 December 1917	Joaquin Mumbru	Spain	2,703	Sunk
10 January 1918	Atlas	Netherlands	1,813	Sunk
8 February 1918	Artesia	United Kingdom	2,762	Sunk
8 February 1918	Chariton	Greece	3,023	Sunk
8 February 1918	Nuzza	Kingdom of Italy	1,102	Sunk
9 February 1918	Atlantide	Kingdom of Italy	5,431	Sunk
26 June 1918	Tortuguero	United Kingdom	4,175	Sunk
7 July 1918	Marosa	Norway	1,987	Sunk
8 July 1918	Manx King	Norway	1,729	Sunk
19 July 1918	USS San Diego	United States Navy	13,680	Sunk
21 July 1918	703	United States	934	Sunk
21 July 1918	740	United States	680	Sunk
21 July 1918	766	United States	527	Sunk
21 July 1918	Lansford	United States	830	Sunk
21 July 1918	Perth Amboy	United States	435	Damaged
22 July 1918	Robert & Richard	United States	140	Sunk
2 August 1918	Dornfontein	Canada	766	Sunk
3 August 1918	Annie Perry	United States	116	Sunk
3 August 1918	Muriel	United States	120	Sunk
3 August 1918	Rob Roy	United States	111	Sunk
3 August 1918	Sydney B. Atwood	United States	100	Sunk
4 August 1918	Nelson A.	United Kingdom	72	Sunk
5 August 1918	Agnes G. Holland	United States	100	Sunk
5 August 1918	Gladys M. Hollett	United Kingdom	203	Damaged
5 August 1918	Luz Blanca	Canada	4,868	Sunk
8 August 1918	Sydland	Sweden	3,031	Sunk
11 August 1918	Penistone	United Kingdom	4,139	Sunk
17 August 1918	San Jose	Norway	1,586	Sunk
20 August 1918	A. Piatt Andrew	United States	141	Sunk
20 August 1918	Francis J. O'hara, Jr.	United States	117	Sunk
20 August 1918	Lucille M. Schnare	Canada	121	Sunk
20 August 1918	Pasadena	Canada	119	Sunk
20 August 1918	Triumph	Canada	239	Sunk
20 August 1918	Uda A. Saunders	Canada	125	Sunk
21 August 1918	Sylvania	United States	136	Sunk
22 August 1918	Notre Dame De La Garde	France	147	Sunk
25 August 1918	C. M. Walters	Canada	107	Sunk
25 August 1918	E. B. Walters	Canada	126	Sunk
25 August 1918	Erik	United Kingdom	583	Sunk
25 August 1918	J. J. Flaherty	United States	162	Sunk
25 August 1918	Marion Adams	Canada	99	Sunk
25 August 1918	Verna D. Adams	Canada	132	Sunk
25 August 1918	Clayton W. Walters	Canada	116	Sunk
26 August 1918	Gloaming	Canada	130	Sunk

== Bibliography ==
- Gibson, R.H.; Maurice Prendergast (2002). The German Submarine War 1914-1918. Periscope Publishing Ltd. ISBN 1-904381-08-1.
- Halpern, Paul G. (1995). A Naval History of World War I. UCL Press. ISBN 9781857284980. - Total pages: 591
- Gröner, Erich; Jung, Dieter; Maass, Martin (1991). U-boats and Mine Warfare Vessels. German Warships 1815–1945. Vol. 2. Translated by Thomas, Keith; Magowan, Rachel. London: Conway Maritime Press. ISBN 0-85177-593-4.
- Jung, Dieter (2004). Die Schiffe der Kaiserlichen Marine 1914-1918 und ihr Verbleib [German Imperial Navy ships 1914-1918 and their fate] (in German). Bonn: Bernard & Graefe. ISBN 3-7637-6247-7.
- Sheard, Bradley (1997). Lost Voyages: Two Centuries of Shipwrecks in the Approaches to New York. Aqua Quest Publications, Inc. ISBN 1-881652-17-3.
- Hodos, Paul (2017). The Kaiser's Lost Kreuzer: A History of U-156 and Germany's Long-Range Submarine Campaign Against North America, 1918. McFarland Publishing. ISBN 978-1476671628.
