= SM UC-22 =

German minelaying submarine

History

German Empire
- Name: UC-22
- Ordered: 29 August 1915
- Builder: Blohm & Voss, Hamburg
- Yard number: 272
- Launched: 1 February 1916
- Commissioned: 30 June 1916
- Fate: Surrendered, 3 February 1919; broken up, July 1921

General characteristics
- Class & type: Type UC II submarine
- Displacement: 417 t (410 long tons), surfaced; 493 t (485 long tons), submerged
- Length: 49.35 m (161 ft 11 in) o/a; 39.30 m (128 ft 11 in) pressure hull
- Beam: 5.22 m (17 ft 2 in) o/a; 3.65 m (12 ft) pressure hull
- Draught: 3.68 m (12 ft 1 in)
- Propulsion: 2 × propeller shafts; 2 × 6-cylinder, 4-stroke diesel engines, 500 PS (370 kW; 490 bhp); 2 × electric motors, 460 PS (340 kW; 450 shp)
- Speed: 11.6 knots (21.5 km/h; 13.3 mph), surfaced; 7.0 knots (13.0 km/h; 8.1 mph), submerged
- Range: 9,430 nmi (17,460 km; 10,850 mi) at 7 knots (13 km/h; 8.1 mph) surfaced; 55 nmi (102 km; 63 mi) at 4 knots (7.4 km/h; 4.6 mph) submerged
- Test depth: 50 m (160 ft)
- Complement: 26
- Armament: 6 × 100 cm (39.4 in) mine tubes; 18 × UC 200 mines; 3 × 50 cm (19.7 in) torpedo tubes (2 bow/external; one stern); 7 × torpedoes; 1 × 8.8 cm (3.5 in) Uk L/30 deck gun
- Notes: 35-second diving time

Service record
- Part of: Pola / Mittelmeer / Mittelmeer II Flotilla; 12 October 1916 – 11 November 1918
- Commanders: Oblt.z.S. Heino von Heimburg; 1 July 1916 – 13 July 1917; Oblt.z.S. Erich Wiesenbach; 14 July – 16 October 1917; Oblt.z.S. Carl Bünte; 1 January – 16 May 1918; Oblt.z.S. Eberhard Weichold; 17 May – 29 November 1918
- Operations: 15 patrols
- Victories: 20 merchant ships sunk (38,141 GRT); 1 warship sunk (414 tons); 2 auxiliary warships sunk (3,210 GRT); 3 merchant ships damaged (14,012 GRT)

SM UC-22 was a German Type UC II minelaying submarine or U-boat in the German Imperial Navy (German: Kaiserliche Marine) during World War I. The U-boat was ordered on 29 August 1915 and was launched on 1 February 1916. She was commissioned into the German Imperial Navy on 30 June 1916 as SM UC-22. (Note: "SM" stands for "Seiner Majestät" (English: His Majesty's) and combined with the U for Unterseeboot would be translated as His Majesty's Submarine.) In 15 patrols UC-22 was credited with sinking 23 ships, either by torpedo or by mines laid. UC-22 was surrendered to France on 3 February 1919 and was broken up at Landerneau in July 1921.

== Design ==
Like all pre-UC-25 Type UC II submarines, UC-22 had a displacement of 417 tonnes (410 long tons) when at the surface and 493 tonnes (485 long tons) while submerged. She had a length overall of 49.35 m (161 ft 11 in), a beam of 5.22 m (17 ft 2 in), and a draught of 3.65 m (12 ft). The submarine was powered by two six-cylinder four-stroke diesel engines each producing 250 metric horsepower (180 kW; 250 shp) (a total of 500 metric horsepower (370 kW; 490 shp)), two electric motors producing 460 metric horsepower (340 kW; 450 shp), and two propeller shafts. She had a dive time of 35 seconds and was capable of operating at a depth of 50 metres (160 ft).

The submarine had a maximum surface speed of 11.6 knots (21.5 km/h; 13.3 mph) and a submerged speed of 7 knots (13 km/h; 8.1 mph). When submerged, she could operate for 55 nautical miles (102 km; 63 mi) at 4 knots (7.4 km/h; 4.6 mph); when surfaced, she could travel 9,430 nautical miles (17,460 km; 10,850 mi) at 7 knots (13 km/h; 8.1 mph). UC-22 was fitted with six 100 centimetres (39 in) mine tubes, eighteen UC 200 mines, three 50 centimetres (20 in) torpedo tubes (one on the stern and two on the bow), seven torpedoes, and one 8.8 cm (3.5 in) Uk L/30 deck gun. Her complement was twenty-six crew members.

== Summary of raiding history ==
Date	Name	Nationality	Tonnage (Note: Merchant ship tonnages are in gross register tons. Military vessels are listed by tons displacement.)	Fate
28 September 1916	Emma	Russian Empire	279	Sunk
29 November 1916	Luciston	United Kingdom	2,948	Sunk
1 December 1916	Burcombe	United Kingdom	3,516	Sunk
4 December 1916	Algerie	France	4,035	Sunk
28 December 1916	Oronsay	United Kingdom	3,761	Sunk
30 December 1916	Apsleyhall	United Kingdom	3,882	Sunk
1 January 1917	Baycraig	United Kingdom	3,761	Sunk
27 February 1917	Bellorado	United Kingdom	4,649	Damaged
3 April 1917	Cloughton	United Kingdom	4,221	Damaged
3 April 1917	Oberon	United Kingdom	5,142	Damaged
5 April 1917	Agia	Greece	20	Sunk
5 April 1917	Evangelistria	Greece	29	Sunk
5 April 1917	Kyriotis	Greece	19	Sunk
17 June 1917	Aghios Georgios	Greece	16	Sunk
20 June 1917	Ariane	French Navy	414	Sunk
31 July 1917	Regina	Greece	70	Sunk
3 August 1917	San Nicola	Kingdom of Italy	30	Sunk
14 August 1917	Julita	Spain	641	Sunk
22 August 1917	Golo II	French Navy	1,380	Sunk
20 January 1918	HMS Louvain	Royal Navy	1,830	Sunk, 224 killed
25 January 1918	Aghios Dimitrios	Greece	50	Sunk
16 April 1918	Romania	Kingdom of Italy	2,562	Sunk
13 June 1918	Octo	Norway	1,620	Sunk
9 August 1918	Girolamo Ciolino	Kingdom of Italy	58	Sunk
10 August 1918	Polynesien	France	6,373	Sunk
27 August 1918	Pampa	France	4,471	Sunk, 117 killed
