= SS Dresden (1896) =

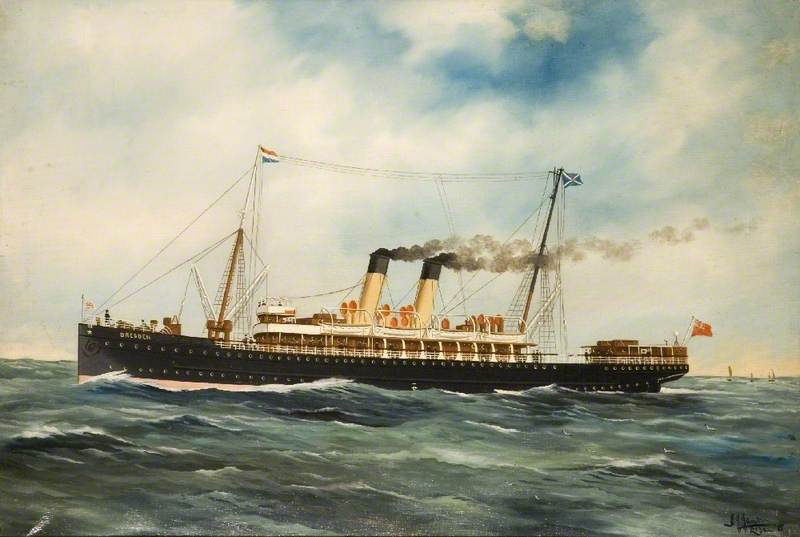
- Dresden in 1915, painting by A. J. Jansen

History

United Kingdom
- Name: Dresden (1897–1915); HMS Louvain (1915–18)
- Owner: Great Eastern Railway (1897–1915); Royal Navy (1915–18)
- Port of registry: (United Kingdom of Great Britain and Ireland) Harwich (1897–1915); (United Kingdom of Great Britain and Ireland) Royal Navy (1915–18)
- Route: Harwich - Hook of Holland (1897–1915)
- Builder: Earle Company
- Launched: 17 November 1896
- Fate: Sunk on January 21, 1918

General characteristics
- Tonnage: 1,830 GRT

SS Dresden was a British passenger ship which operated, as such, from 1897 to 1915. She is known as the place of the 1913 disappearance of German engineer Rudolf Diesel, inventor of the diesel engine. The ship was built in 1897 by the Earle Company at Hull for the Great Eastern Railway. She operated on the North Sea route between Harwich and the Hook of Holland. She was renamed HMS Louvain in 1915 and was used by the Royal Navy in World War I. until her loss in 1918.

== Diesel's disappearance ==
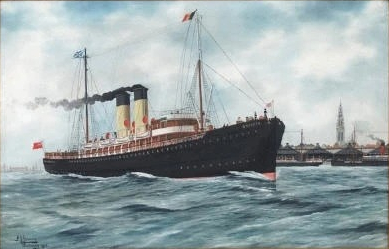
Dresden in Antwerp Harbour, 1913

On 29 September 1913 Rudolf Diesel, German engineer who invented the diesel engine, boarded Dresden at Antwerp, Belgium on his way to a meeting in London. He retired to his cabin about 22:00 with a request to be called at 06:15 in the morning, but he was not seen alive again. Later a Dutch ship found a body floating in the sea and from the items and clothes recovered the remains were identified as Diesel's.

== Royal Navy ==
In 1915 Dresden was taken over by the British Admiralty as an armed boarding steamer and renamed HMS Louvain. On 21 January 1918, she was torpedoed by the Imperial German Navy submarine SM UC-22 in the Aegean Sea with the loss of seven officers and 217 men. There were only 16 survivors.

The dead included 70 Maltese naval ratings, which made the loss of the ship Malta's largest incident of loss of life during the war. A Naval and Dockyard Families Help Society was set up to help the families of the Maltese victims of the sinking.
