= HMS Osmanieh (1906) =

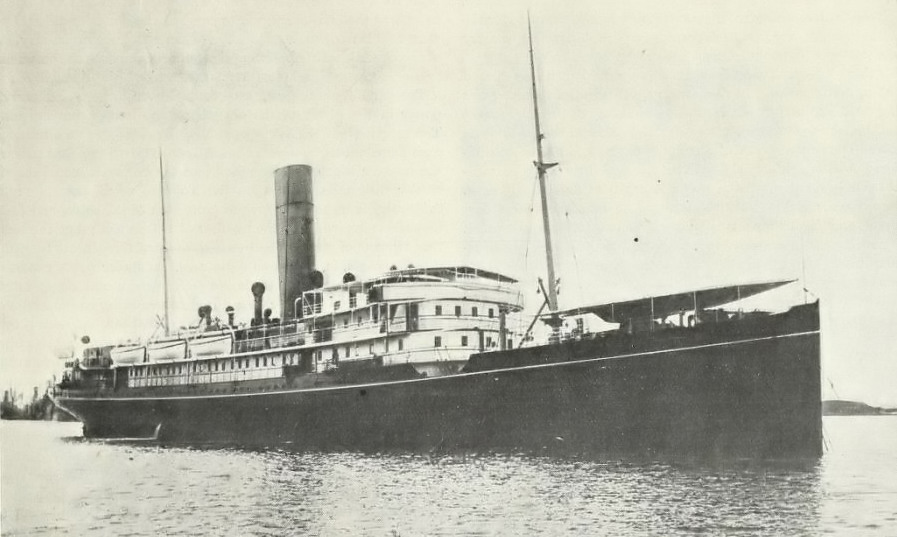
- Osmanieh

History

United Kingdom
- Name: SS Osmanieh (1906–16); HMS Osmanieh (1916–17)
- Owner: Khedivial Mail Steamship & Graving Dock Co., Ltd
- Port of registry: (United Kingdom) Southampton
- Builder: Swan, Hunter & Wigham Richardson
- Yard number: 761
- Launched: 9 May 1906
- Completed: August 1906
- Identification: Registration number: 123690
- Fate: Sunk by mine 31 December 1917

General characteristics
- Type: passenger liner
- Tonnage: 4,041 GRT
- Length: 109.79 m (360.2 ft)
- Beam: 13.77 m (45.2 ft)
- Installed power: 650 NHP
- Propulsion: quadruple expansion steam engines
- Speed: 17 knots (31 km/h)

HMS Osmanieh was a passenger and cargo ship that entered service in 1906. In 1916, the ship was requisitioned as a troopship and supply ship for the British Royal Navy in the First World War. On 31 December 1917, Osmanieh struck a mine laid by the Imperial German Naval U-boat SM UC-34 and sank at Alexandria, Egypt with the loss of 209 lives.

== The ship ==
The 4,041-ton steamship Osmanieh was built at the shipyard Swan, Hunter & Wigham Richardson in Wallsend. She was launched on 9 May 1906 and completed in August of that year. The 109.79-metre (360.2 ft)-long and 13.77 metres (45.2 ft)-wide ship had a maximum draught of 7.40 meters (24.3 ft) and was equipped with quadruple expansion steam engines, which acted on two propellers and had a maximum speed of 17 knots (31 km/h) enabled. The engines were rated at 650 nominal horsepower.

Osmanieh was ordered for the British-Egyptian shipping company, Khedivial Mail Steamship & Graving Dock Co., Ltd., which had offices in London and Alexandria and the ship was designed as a combined passenger and cargo ship. The company was founded in 1898 to keep ships and ports in service for the Egyptian government. However, the ships sailed under the British flag and ran between Alexandria, Constantinople, Syria and other Mediterranean ports.

In September 1915 she was used to transport the 22nd Battalion from the Greek island of Lemnos to Anzac Cove on the Gallipoli Peninsula.

On 12 May 1916, Osmanieh was hired by the British Royal Navy as a Hired Transport (HT) for World War I military service and henceforth carried supplies and personnel. The ship was registered as Fleet Messenger No. 61 and received the Admiralty No. Y4.61. On 23 June 1917 the ship evaded two torpedoes when it was attacked by a German submarine.

== Sinking ==
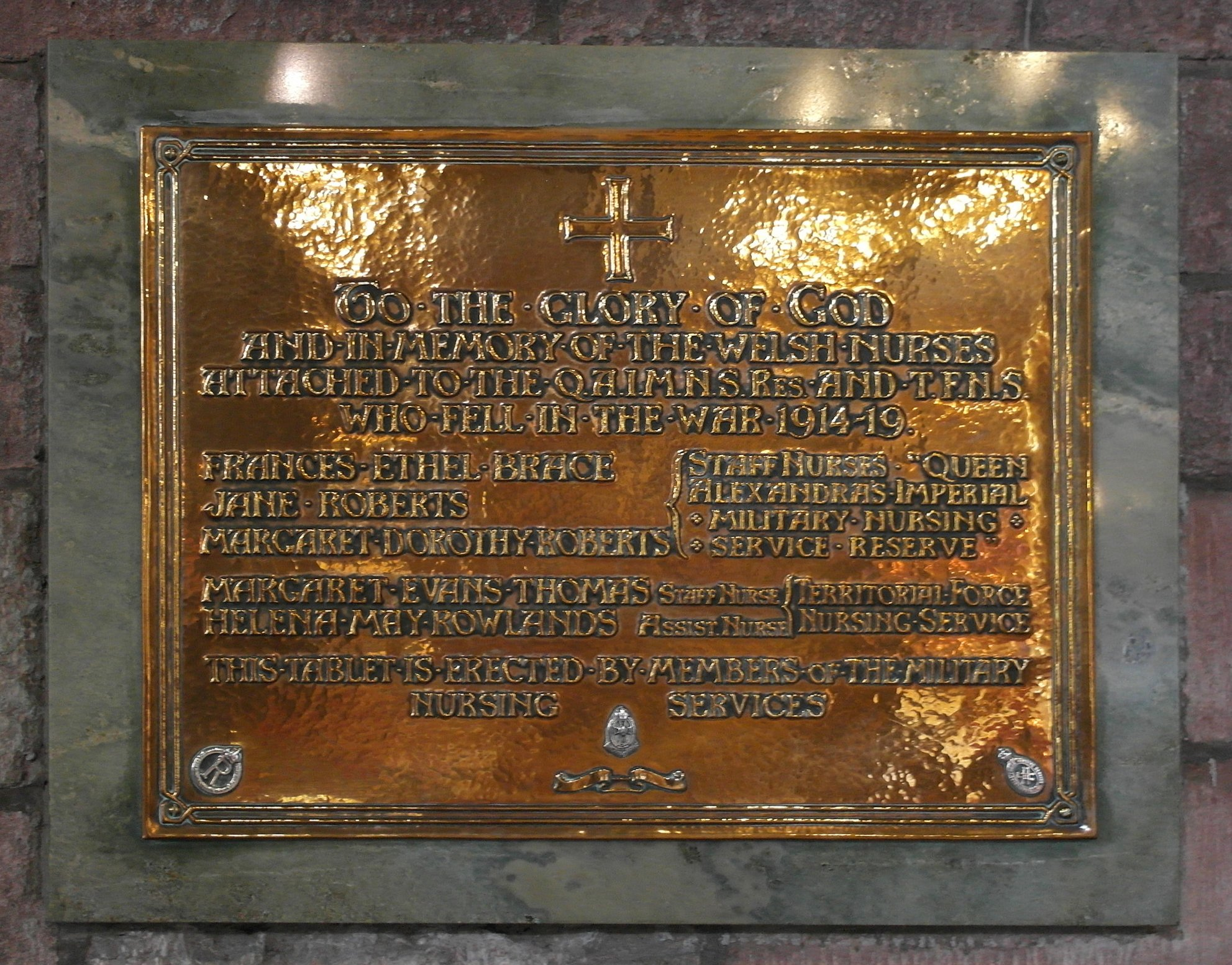
Commemorative plaque for the nurses who died in the sinking

On 17 December 1917, Osmanieh carrying soldiers and medical personnel left Southampton and set a course for Alexandria with a stopover in the southern Italian port city of Taranto. Taranto was reached on 28 December and Alexandria on 31 December. Even before the harbour entrance, the steamer was struck amidships on the starboard side at the position 31°10′8″N 29°48′3″E by a naval mine from a minefield left a few days earlier by the German submarine SM UC-34.

The ship sank in five to seven minutes, killing 209 people including eight nurses.

One of the survivors of the sinking of Osmanieh was Jack Cohen, then a member of the Royal Flying Corps. After the War he founded the British multinational retail chain Tesco.
