= Hyman Kreitman =

British businessman (1914–2001)

- Born: 3 June 1914
- Died: 8 May 2001 (aged 86)
- Education: Cordwainers College
- Occupations: Businessman, philanthropist
- Spouse: Irene Cohen
- Children: 2 sons, 1 daughter
- Relatives: Jack Cohen (father-in-law); Shirley Porter (sister-in-law)

Hyman Kreitman (3 June 1914 – 8 May 2001) was a British businessman, philanthropist and art collector. He served as the chairman of Tesco from 1970 to 1974. He was a donor to Tate and the Ben-Gurion University of the Negev.

== Early life ==
Hyman Kreitman was born on 3 June 1914. He had four older brothers. His father was Abraham Kreitman, who owned A. Kreitman & Sons, Boot and Shoe Manufacturers, of 28 Cambridge Road, Mile End, London. The business was "one of London's largest and most successful shoe manufacturers".

He was educated at Cordwainers College, now part of the London College of Fashion. He served in the Royal Artillery during World War II.

== Career ==
Kreitman became an executive at Tesco, the supermarket chain. He served as its managing director from 1968 to 1970, and as its chairman from 1970 to 1974.

== Philanthropy ==
With his wife, Kreitman endowed the Kreitman Foundation. They donated to Wigmore Hall and the Royal National Theatre. They also donated GBP£2.2 million to Tate Britain, where the Hyman Kreitman Reading Rooms are named in his honour. Meanwhile, they supported the establishment of Tate Modern.

Kreitman and his wife were donors to the Ben-Gurion University of the Negev in Israel, where the Kreitman Plaza is named in their honour, as is the Irene and Hyman Kreitman Annual Memorial Lecture. Kreitman received an honorary doctorate in philosophy from BGU in 1979.

== Art collection ==
With his wife, Kreitman collected sculptures by Kenneth Armitage, Michael Ayrton, Henry Moore, Barbara Hepworth, Elisabeth Frink, Anthony Caro and Lynn Chadwick. They also collected paintings by John Piper and Ben Nicholson.

== Personal life and death ==
Kreitman married Irene Cohen, the daughter of Tesco founder Jack Cohen. They had two sons and one daughter. He died on 8 May 2001 at the age of 86. His widow, Irene, died in 2005. Their art collection was auctioned by Sotheby's in October 2005.
