= SM U-107 =

Submarine serving in the Imperial German Navy in World War I

History

German Empire
- Name: U-107
- Ordered: 5 May 1916
- Builder: Germaniawerft, Kiel
- Yard number: 276
- Launched: 28 June 1917
- Commissioned: 18 August 1917
- Fate: Surrendered 20 November 1918; scrapped Swansea 1919

General characteristics
- Class & type: Type U 93 submarine
- Displacement: 798 t (785 long tons) surfaced; 1,000 t (980 long tons) submerged
- Length: 71.55 m (234 ft 9 in) (o/a); 56.05 m (183 ft 11 in) (pressure hull)
- Beam: 6.30 m (20 ft 8 in) (o/a); 4.15 m (13 ft 7 in) (pressure hull)
- Height: 8.25 m (27 ft 1 in)
- Draught: 3.90 m (12 ft 10 in)
- Installed power: 2 × 2,400 PS (1,765 kW; 2,367 shp) surfaced; 2 × 1,200 PS (883 kW; 1,184 shp) submerged
- Propulsion: 2 shafts, 2 × 1.70 m (5 ft 7 in) propellers
- Speed: 16.4 knots (30.4 km/h; 18.9 mph) surfaced; 8.4 knots (15.6 km/h; 9.7 mph) submerged
- Range: 9,280 nmi (17,190 km; 10,680 mi) at 8 knots (15 km/h; 9.2 mph) surfaced; 50 nmi (93 km; 58 mi) at 5 knots (9.3 km/h; 5.8 mph) submerged
- Test depth: 50 m (160 ft)
- Complement: 4 officers, 32 enlisted
- Armament: 6 × 50 cm (19.7 in) torpedo tubes (four bow, two stern); 12-16 torpedoes; 1 × 10.5 cm (4.1 in) SK L/45 deck gun; 1 × 8.8 cm (3.5 in) SK L/30 deck gun

Service record
- Part of: IV Flotilla; 21 September 1917 – 11 November 1918
- Commanders: Kptlt. Wilhelm-Friedrich Starke; 18 August – 31 December 1917; Oblt.z.S. Kurt Slevogt; 1 January – 31 July 1918; Kptlt. Kurt Siewert; 1 August – 11 November 1918
- Operations: 5 patrols
- Victories: 6 merchant ships sunk (24,663 GRT); 1 merchant ship damaged (1,084 GRT)

SM U-107 (Note: "SM" stands for "Seiner Majestät" (English: His Majesty's) and combined with the U for Unterseeboot would be translated as His Majesty's Submarine.) was one of the 329 submarines serving in the Imperial German Navy in World War I. U-107 was engaged in the naval warfare and took part in the First Battle of the Atlantic.

U-107 was surrendered to the Allies at Harwich on 20 November 1918 in accordance with the requirements of the Armistice with Germany. She was sold by the British Admiralty to George Cohen on 3 March 1919 for £2,425 (excluding her engines), and was broken up at Swansea.

== Design ==
Type U 93 submarines were preceded by the shorter Type U 87 submarines. U-107 had a displacement of 798 tonnes (785 long tons) when at the surface and 1,000 tonnes (980 long tons) while submerged. She had a total length of 71.55 m (234 ft 9 in), a pressure hull length of 56.05 m (183 ft 11 in), a beam of 6.30 m (20 ft 8 in), a height of 8.25 m (27 ft 1 in), and a draught of 3.90 m (12 ft 10 in). The submarine was powered by two 2,400 metric horsepower (1,800 kW; 2,400 shp) engines for use while surfaced, and two 1,200 metric horsepower (880 kW; 1,200 shp) engines for use while submerged. She had two propeller shafts and two 1.70 m (5 ft 7 in) propellers. She was capable of operating at depths of up to 50 metres (160 ft).

The submarine had a maximum surface speed of 16.4 knots (30.4 km/h; 18.9 mph) and a maximum submerged speed of 8.4 knots (15.6 km/h; 9.7 mph). When submerged, she could operate for 50 nautical miles (93 km; 58 mi) at 5 knots (9.3 km/h; 5.8 mph); when surfaced, she could travel 9,280 nautical miles (17,190 km; 10,680 mi) at 8 knots (15 km/h; 9.2 mph). U-107 was fitted with six 50 centimetres (20 in) torpedo tubes (four at the bow and two at the stern), twelve to sixteen torpedoes, one 10.5 cm (4.1 in) SK L/45, and one 8.8 cm (3.5 in) SK L/30 deck gun. She had a complement of thirty-six (thirty-two crew members and four officers).

== Summary of raiding history ==
Date	Name	Nationality	Tonnage (Note: Tonnages are in gross register tons)	Fate
21 October 1917	Epiros	Greece	1,084	Damaged
14 April 1918	Marstonmoor	United Kingdom	2,744	Sunk
29 June 1918	Castor I	Norway	117	Sunk
15 August 1918	Cubore	United States	7,117	Sunk
18 August 1918	Idaho	United Kingdom	3,023	Sunk
21 August 1918	Lake Edon	United States	2,371	Sunk
24 August 1918	Flavia	United Kingdom	9,291	Sunk

== Bibliography ==
- Gröner, Erich; Jung, Dieter; Maass, Martin (1991). U-boats and Mine Warfare Vessels. German Warships 1815–1945. Vol. 2. Translated by Thomas, Keith; Magowan, Rachel. London: Conway Maritime Press. ISBN 0-85177-593-4.
