= USS Saetia =

Cargo ship of the United States Navy

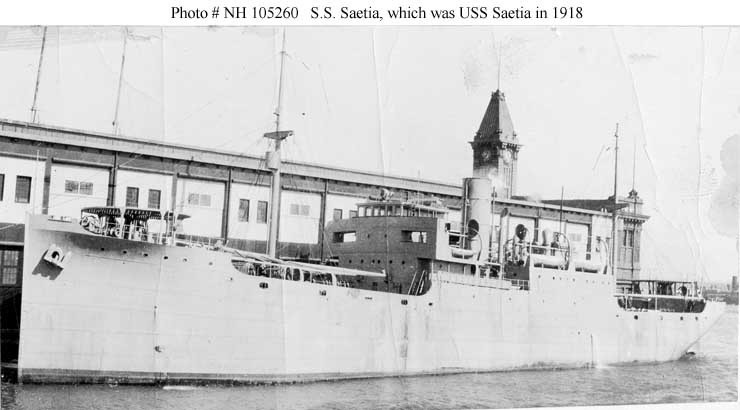
- SS Saetia in 1918, prior to her commissioning as USS Saetia (ID-2317).

History

United States
- Name: USS Saetia
- Builder: Harlan and Hollingsworth, Wilmington, Delaware
- Launched: 19 December 1917
- Completed: 1918
- Commissioned: 1 March 1918
- Fate: Sunk 9 November 1918

General characteristics
- Type: Cargo ship
- Displacement: 6,376 long tons (6,478 t)
- Length: 322 ft (98 m)
- Beam: 48 ft 3 in (14.71 m)
- Draft: 19 ft (5.8 m)
- Propulsion: Steam engine(s)
- Speed: 11 kn (13 mph; 20 km/h)
- Complement: 81
- Armament: 1 × 5-inch (127-mm) mount, 1 × 6-pounder gun

USS Saetia (ID-2317) was a United States Navy cargo ship in commission in 1918 that was sunk during World War I.

== Construction and commissioning ==
Saetia was laid down as the commercial steel-hulled cargo ship SS Colorado at Wilmington, Delaware, by Harlan and Hollingsworth for the Mallory Steamship Line. While she was under construction, the United States Shipping Board's Emergency Fleet Corporation requisitioned her. The U.S. Navy inspected her for possible World War I service on 8 February 1918 and earmarked her for service as a depot collier. After renaming her SS Saetia to avoid confusion with the battleship USS Colorado (BB-45), then under construction, the Navy assigned her Identification No. 2317 and commissioned her as USS Saetia (ID-2317) on 1 March 1918 at Philadelphia, Pennsylvania.

== Service history ==
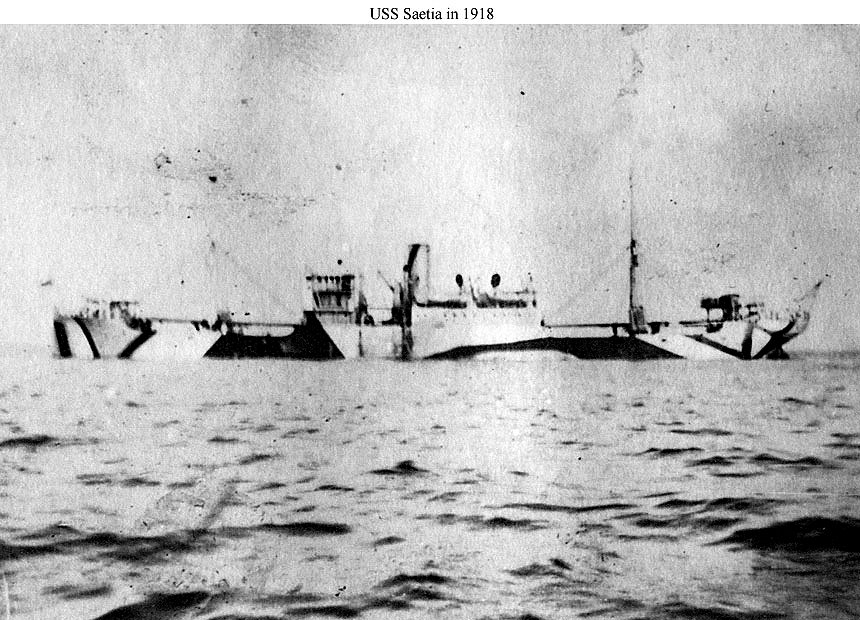
USS Saetia in 1918, painted in dazzle camouflage.

Upon her commissioning, Saetia was assigned to the Naval Overseas Transportation Service (NOTS). Following a period of repairs that included the installation of her gun battery, Saetia took on a full load of supplies for the United States Army Quartermaster Corps and departed Philadelphia for New York City on 14 March 1918. At New York, she joined a convoy that departed for France on 16 March 1918. After the convoy arrived at Brest on 31 March 1918, Saetia steamed on to Rochefort, unloaded her cargo, and then joined a convoy for Philadelphia. Arriving at Philadelphia in ballast on 3 May 1918, she underwent minor repairs and then moved to New York City join her second France-bound convoy, which got underway on 17 May 1918 and arrived at Quiberon to discharge cargo and load ballast on 1 June 1918. Saetia returned to Philadelphia on 2 July 1918 and, after repairs at Cramp Shipbuilding Company, during which she also loaded general cargo and ammunition, she steamed to New York on 15 July 1918. Joining a France-bound convoy on 24 July 1918, she delivered her goods at Gironde on 11 August 1918 and sailed for Philadelphia at the end of August 1918.

Saetia, with U.S. Army supplies in her holds, again joined a France-bound convoy at New York on 22 September 1918, bound for Brest. Arriving at Brest on 7 October 1918, she steamed on to Bordeaux, discharged her cargo, and then sailed for Philadelphia in ballast on 24 October 1918. She never reached Philadelphia. At 0830 on 9 November 1918, just two days before the Armistice of 11 November 1918, Saetia struck a mine – most likely laid by the Imperial German Navy submarine SM U-117 sometime between 8 August and 1 September 1918 – abreast her number 3 hold and sank in the Atlantic Ocean off Fenwick Island, Delaware, 10 nautical miles south-southeast of Fenwick Island Lightship in about 120 feet (37 meters) of water. All hands survived, although 13 men suffered injuries. Sixty-six men abandoned ship in four lifeboats, and the other 19 took to two life rafts. The men in lifeboats landed at United States Coast Guard Station No. 146 at Ocean City, Maryland, while the steamship Kennebec picked up those in the life rafts and put them ashore safely at Cape May, New Jersey.
