= SM UB-92 =

Submarine of the German Imperial Navy

- UB-148 at sea, a U-boat similar to UB-92.

History

German Empire
- Name: UB-92
- Ordered: 6 / 8 February 1917
- Builder: AG Vulcan, Hamburg
- Cost: 3,654,000 German Papiermark
- Yard number: 108
- Launched: 25 March 1918
- Commissioned: 27 April 1918
- Fate: Surrendered 21 November 1918, broken up in 1919-20

General characteristics
- Class & type: Type UB III submarine
- Displacement: 510 t (500 long tons) surfaced; 640 t (630 long tons) submerged
- Length: 55.52 m (182 ft 2 in) (o/a)
- Beam: 5.76 m (18 ft 11 in)
- Draught: 3.73 m (12 ft 3 in)
- Propulsion: 2 × propeller shaft; 2 × MAN-Vulcan four-stroke 6-cylinder diesel engines, 1,085 bhp (809 kW); 2 × Siemens-Schuckert electric motors, 780 shp (580 kW)
- Speed: 13 knots (24 km/h; 15 mph) surfaced; 7.4 knots (13.7 km/h; 8.5 mph) submerged
- Range: 7,120 nmi (13,190 km; 8,190 mi) at 6 knots (11 km/h; 6.9 mph) surfaced; 55 nmi (102 km; 63 mi) at 4 knots (7.4 km/h; 4.6 mph) submerged
- Test depth: 50 m (160 ft)
- Complement: 3 officers, 31 men
- Armament: 5 × 50 cm (19.7 in) torpedo tubes (4 bow, 1 stern); 10 torpedoes; 1 × 10.5 cm (4.13 in) deck gun

Service record
- Part of: II Flotilla; 12 July – 11 November 1918
- Commanders: Kptlt.d.R. Franz Krapohl; 27 April – 30 June 1918; Oblt.z.S. Johannes Paul Müller; 1 July – 11 November 1918
- Operations: 2 patrols
- Victories: 8 merchant ships sunk (17,189 GRT)

SM UB-92 was a German Type UB III submarine or U-boat in the German Imperial Navy (German: Kaiserliche Marine) during World War I. She was commissioned into the German Imperial Navy on 27 April 1918 as SM UB-92. (Note: "SM" stands for "Seiner Majestät" (English: His Majesty's) and combined with the U for Unterseeboot would be translated as His Majesty's Submarine.)

UB-92 was surrendered to Britain on 21 November 1918 and broken up in Bo'ness in 1919/20.

== Construction ==
She was built by AG Vulcan of Hamburg and following just under a year of construction, launched at Hamburg on 25 March 1918. UB-92 was commissioned later the same year. Like all Type UB III submarines, UB-92 carried 10 torpedoes and was armed with a 10.5 cm (4.13 in) deck gun. UB-92 would carry a crew of up to 3 officer and 31 men and had a cruising range of 7,120 nautical miles (13,190 km; 8,190 mi). UB-92 had a displacement of 510 t (500 long tons) while surfaced and 640 t (630 long tons) when submerged. Her engines enabled her to travel at 13 knots (24 km/h; 15 mph) when surfaced and 7.4 knots (13.7 km/h; 8.5 mph) when submerged.

== Summary of raiding history ==
Date	Name	Nationality	Tonnage (Note: Tonnages are in gross register tons)	Fate
20 August 1918	Boltonhall	United Kingdom	3,595	Sunk
21 August 1918	Boscawen	United Kingdom	1,936	Sunk
22 August 1918	Palmella	United Kingdom	1,352	Sunk
24 August 1918	Virent	United Kingdom	3,771	Sunk
25 August 1918	Carasa	Spain	2,099	Sunk
17 October 1918	Bonvilston	United Kingdom	2,865	Sunk
18 October 1918	Industry	United Kingdom	1,460	Sunk
20 October 1918	Emily Millington	United Kingdom	111	Sunk

== Bibliography ==
- Bendert, Harald (2000). Die UB-Boote der Kaiserlichen Marine, 1914-1918. Einsätze, Erfolge, Schicksal (in German). Hamburg: Verlag E.S. Mittler & Sohn GmbH. ISBN 3-8132-0713-7.
- Gröner, Erich; Jung, Dieter; Maass, Martin (1991). U-boats and Mine Warfare Vessels. German Warships 1815–1945. Vol. 2. Translated by Thomas, Keith; Magowan, Rachel. London: Conway Maritime Press. ISBN 0-85177-593-4.
- Rössler, Eberhard (1979). Die deutschen U-Boote und ihre Werften: eine Bilddokumentation über den deutschen U-Bootbau; in zwei Bänden (in German). Vol. I. Munich: Bernard & Graefe. ISBN 3-7637-5213-7.
