= U111 =

U111 or U-111 may refer to:

- German submarine U-111, one of several U-boats with the number 111
- Utah State Route 111, a highway that straddles the western portion of the Salt Lake City metropolitan area
