= SM U-117 =

German Type UE II submarine

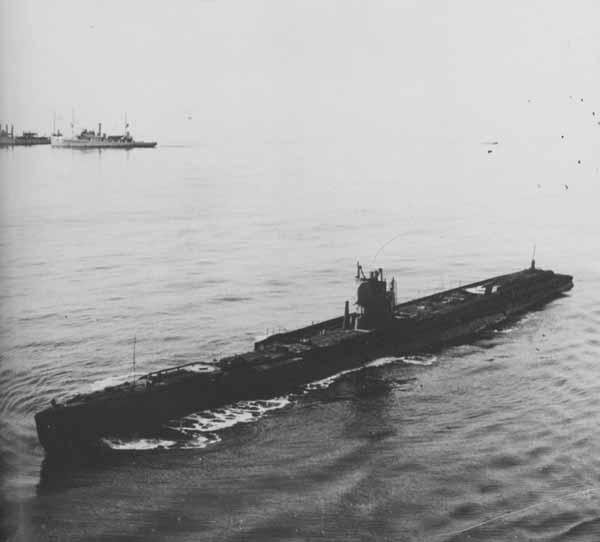
- SM U-117 at Cape Charles

History

German Empire
- Name: U-117
- Builder: AG Vulcan Stettin
- Yard number: 91
- Laid down: 1917
- Launched: 10 December 1917
- Commissioned: 28 March 1918
- Home port: Kiel
- Fate: Surrendered, 21 November 1918; Taken over by the US Navy, 1919

United States
- Name: U-117
- Acquired: March 1919
- Fate: Sunk as a target, 22 June 1921

General characteristics
- Class & type: Type UE II submarine
- Type: Coastal minelaying submarine
- Displacement: 1,164 t (1,146 long tons) surfaced; 1,512 t (1,488 long tons) submerged
- Length: 81.52 m (267 ft 5 in) (o/a)
- Beam: 7.42 m (24 ft 4 in)
- Height: 10.16 m (33 ft 4 in)
- Draught: 4.22 m (13 ft 10 in)
- Installed power: 2 × diesel engines, 2,400 PS (1,765 kW; 2,367 shp); 2 × electric motors, 1,200 PS (883 kW; 1,184 shp)
- Propulsion: 2 shafts, 2 × 1.61 m (5 ft 3 in) propellers
- Speed: 14.7 knots (27.2 km/h; 16.9 mph) surfaced; 7 knots (13 km/h; 8.1 mph) submerged
- Range: 13,900 nmi (25,700 km; 16,000 mi) at 8 knots (15 km/h; 9.2 mph) surfaced; 35 nmi (65 km; 40 mi) at 4.5 knots (8.3 km/h; 5.2 mph) submerged
- Test depth: 75 m (246 ft)
- Complement: 4 officers, 36 enlisted
- Armament: 4 × 50 cm (19.7 in) bow torpedo tubes; 14 torpedoes; 2 × 100 cm (39 in) stern mine chutes; 42 mines; 1 × 15 cm (5.9 in) SK L/45 deck gun; 494 rounds; 1 × 8.8 cm (3.5 in) SK L/30 deck gun; 310 rounds

Service record
- Commanders: Kptlt. Otto Dröscher; 28 March – 11 November 1918
- Operations: 1 patrol
- Victories: 20 merchant ships sunk (27,459 GRT); 3 merchant ships damaged (12,845 GRT); 1 warship damaged (18,000 tons)

SM U-117 was a Type UE II long-range minelayer submarine of the Imperial German Navy. She was laid down in 1917, at Hamburg, Germany, by Aktiengesellschaft Vulcan and launched on 10 December 1917. She was commissioned in the Imperial German Navy on 28 March 1918, with Kapitänleutnant Otto Dröscher in command. After shakedown, U-117 was posted to the U-Kreuzer Verband (submarine cruiser unit) on 1 June 1918. Over the next five weeks, she completed fitting out at Kiel. In her short career, she became the most successful submarine of her class, sinking 20 vessels.

== Service history ==
=== Operations off North America ===
On 11 July, U-117 departed Kiel and took the eastern route through the Baltic Sea around Denmark and out into the North Sea by way of the Skagerrak. After rounding the Shetland Islands, she set a course for the coast of North America to lay minefields off the coast of the United States and to conduct cruiser warfare. During the voyage across the Atlantic, heavy weather foiled her attempts to attack two lone steamers, two convoys, and a small cruiser.

U-117 reached the American coastal zone on 8 August 1918, and her fortunes improved soon thereafter. On 10 August, she encountered a fleet of fishing craft and went on a spree, sinking eight of the vessels with explosives and gunfire. On 12 August, she sighted the ballast-laden steamer Sommerstadt and, after observing that the Norwegian steamer was armed, made a submerged attack that sank her with a single torpedo. The following day, the U-boat made another submerged torpedo attack and hit the 7,127 gross register tons (GRT) American tanker Frederic R. Kellogg, bound from Tampico, Mexico, to Boston, Massachusetts, with 7,500 barrels of crude oil. The action occurred only 12 mi (19 km) north of Barnegat Light, New Jersey; however, Frederic R. Kellogg was disabled in such shallow water that the Americans were able to salvage her.

Later that same day, the minelayer submarine began the other half of her duty by laying mines near Barnegat Light. The effort subsequently bore fruit when the Mallory Line steamship San Saba struck a mine and sank on 4 October 1918 and the Cuban cargo ship Chaparra struck another mine and sank on 27 October. On 14 August, U-117 took a break from mining operations to resume cruiser warfare when she encountered the American schooner Dorothy B. Barrett. The U-boat brought her deck guns to bear on the sailing vessel and sank her. Shortly thereafter, however, the hunter became the hunted when an American seaplane forced the submarine to seek refuge beneath the surface. The aircraft and submarine chaser SC-71 subjected U-117 to a brief barrage of bombs, and SC-71 attacked the submarine with depth charges before losing track of her.

The next day, 15 August 1918, U-117 resumed her mine laying operations off Fenwick Island Light. That field later claimed two victims, one damaged and the other sunk. On 29 September 1918, Minnesota struck one of those mines and suffered extensive damage. The Naval Overseas Transportation Service cargo ship Saetia entered the same field on 9 November, struck a mine, and sank. Later that day – still 14 August – the submarine moved farther south and, after laying a third minefield near Winter Quarter Shoals Lightship, halted an American sailing vessel, the 1,613 GRT Madrugada, and sank her with gunfire. A patrolling American seaplane foiled a subsequent attempt by the U-boat that day to stop another sailing ship.

On 16 August 1918, U-117 resumed her mining operations, this time off Cape Hatteras, North Carolina, but the approach of the 6,978 GRT British steamer Mirlo interrupted her labors. Approaching the target submerged, U-117 fired a single torpedo that sent the merchantman to the bottom. Following that attack, the submarine again began laying mines, sowing her fourth and final field. At that point, a severe shortage of fuel forced the U-boat to head for Germany.

=== Return journey ===
The return voyage proved to be both more eventful and more successful than the outward-bound cruise. On 17 August 1918, she stopped a Norwegian sailing ship, the 2,846 GRT Nordhav, out of Buenos Aires, Argentina, bound for New York laden with linseed. U-117 sailors placed bombs on board the cargo carrier that sank the prize. Three days later, the U-boat engaged in an unsuccessful surface gun duel with an unidentified, strongly armed steamer. On 26 August, she stopped the 145 GRT Rush and sank that American trawler with bombs placed on board. The next day, U-117 caught sight of the Norwegian freighter Bergsdalen, steaming in ballast from La Pallice, France, to Baltimore, Maryland, and sank her quarry with a single torpedo. Three days later, on 30 August, she encountered her final two victims, when she stopped the 136 GRT British fishing trawlers Elsie Porter and Potentate and sank both with explosive charges.

After an unsuccessful attempt at a torpedo attack on a lone British steamer, War Ranee, on 5 September 1918, U-117 concentrated on making the final run-in toward the Skagerrak and safety. Her critical fuel shortage forced the submarine to make wireless contact with U-140 on 8 September, to set up a fuel replenishment rendezvous. The two U-boats met on 12 and 13 September, near the Faroe Islands, and U-117 took on about 6,000 US gal (23,000 L; 5,000 imp gal) of diesel oil before continuing on toward Kiel. On 20 September, U-117's fuel bunkers again ran dry in the Kattegat. Two torpedo boats were dispatched to tow the powerless U-boat only to have one of the tow lines break. After transferring another 660 US gal (2,500 L) from one of the torpedo boats to U-117, the submarine continued on its way, pulling alongside the pre-Dreadnought SMS Hannover in the Danish Straits on the 21st where more fuel was transferred to the U-boat. U-117 eventually reached base on her own power on 22 September.

For the rest of the war, U-117 remained inactive. On 23 October 1918, she was reassigned to the U-Flotille, Hochseeflotte (1st Submarine Flotilla, High Seas Fleet); but remained in a shipyard for the duration.

=== Turned over to US Navy ===
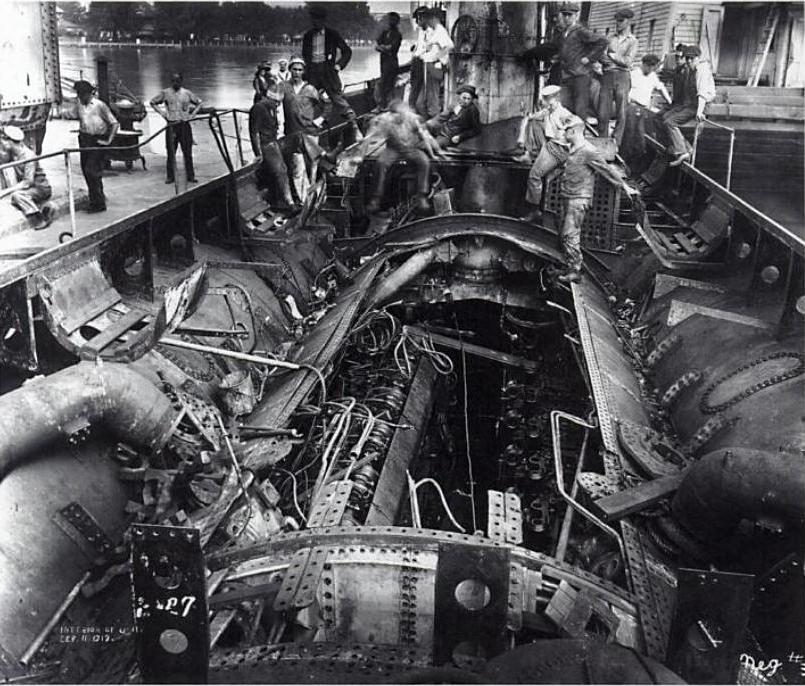
U-117, partially dismantled, at the Philadelphia Navy Yard, 1920

The armistice of 11 November 1918, ended hostilities, and required Germany to turn over her submarines to the Allies. U-117 surrendered at Harwich, England, ten days later. Over the ensuing weeks, the United States Navy expressed an interest in acquiring several former German submarines to serve as exhibits during a Victory Bond campaign. U-117 became one of the six boats set aside for that purpose. In March 1919, her American crew took over the submarine and placed her in special commission, Lieutenant Commander Aquilla G. Dibrell in command.

After a hectic time preparing for sea, U-117 stood down the English Channel from Harwich on 3 April, in company with the submarine tender Sumner, and UB-88, UB-148, and UC-97. This unlikely American task organization, dubbed the Ex-German Submarine Expeditionary Force, called at the Azores and Bermuda before reaching New York City on 27 April 1919, where the submarines were soon opened to the public. Tourists, photographers, reporters, Navy Department technicians, and civilian submarine manufacturers all flocked in to see the six war trophies. Then orders came for her to begin a series of port visits to sell Victory Bonds. U-117 drew one of the east coast itineraries during the course of which she stopped at Washington, D.C., and spent a significant period of time at the Washington Navy Yard there. At the conclusion of the bond drive late that summer, the U-boat was laid up at the Philadelphia Navy Yard along with U-140 and UB-148. There, she remained – partially dismantled – until taken out to sea in June 1921, to serve as a target for aerial bombing tests conducted by the Navy and Army.

=== Sinking ===
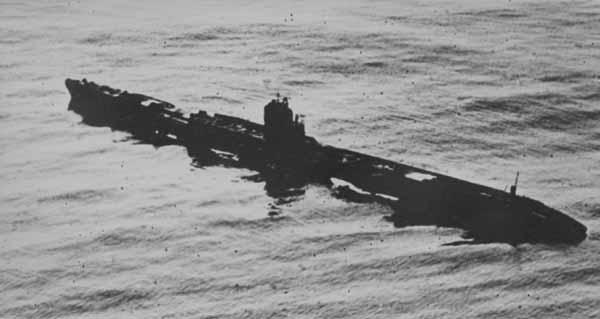
U-117 as a target ship

On 21 June 1921, three Navy Felixstowe F5L flying boats flying at an altitude of 1,200 ft (370 m) bombed and sank U-117 at anchor in smooth water 50 nautical miles (93 km; 58 mi) East of Cape Charles Light Vessel, with twelve 163 lb (74 kg) bombs, each loaded with 117 lb (53 kg) of TNT.

The bombs were dropped in two salvos, one of three bombs and one of nine bombs. Both salvos straddled and fell close to the target, all within 150 ft (46 m) of it, all bombs functioned as designed. The submarine sank within seven minutes after the second salvo. The Board of Observers did not inspect her.

== Summary of raiding history ==
Date	Name	Nationality	Tonnage (Note: Merchant ship tonnages are in gross register tons. Military vessels are listed by tons displacement.)	Fate
10 August 1918	Aleda May	United States	31	Sunk
10 August 1918	Cruiser	United States	28	Sunk
10 August 1918	Earl & Nettie	United States	24	Sunk
10 August 1918	Katie L. Palmer	United States	31	Sunk
10 August 1918	Mary E. Sennett	United States	26	Sunk
10 August 1918	Progress	United States	34	Sunk
10 August 1918	Reliance	United States	19	Sunk
10 August 1918	William H. Starbuck	United States	53	Sunk
12 August 1918	Sommerstad	Norway	3,875	Sunk
13 August 1918	Frederic R. Kellogg	United States	7,127	Damaged
14 August 1918	Dorothy B. Barrett	United States	2,088	Sunk
15 August 1918	Madrugada	United States	1,613	Sunk
16 August 1918	Mirlo	United Kingdom	6,978	Sunk
17 August 1918	Nordhav	Norway	2,846	Sunk
20 August 1918	Ansaldo III	Kingdom of Italy	5,310	Damaged
24 August 1918	Bianca	United Kingdom	408	Damaged
26 August 1918	Rush	United States	145	Sunk
27 August 1918	Bergsdalen	Norway	2,555	Sunk
30 August 1918	Elsie Porter	United Kingdom	136	Sunk
30 August 1918	Potentate	United Kingdom	136	Sunk
29 September 1918	USS Minnesota	United States Navy	18,000	Damaged
4 October 1918	San Saba	United States	2,458	Sunk
27 October 1918	Chaparra	Cuba	1,510	Sunk
9 November 1918	Saetia	United States	2,873	Sunk

== Bibliography ==
- Etzold, Dominic (2023). Reaping the Whirlwind: The U-Boat War off North America During WWI. Atglen: Schiffer Military History. ISBN 978-0-7643-6704-5
- Gröner, Erich; Jung, Dieter; Maass, Martin (1991). U-boats and Mine Warfare Vessels. German Warships 1815–1945. Vol. 2. Translated by Thomas, Keith; Magowan, Rachel. London: Conway Maritime Press. ISBN 0-85177-593-4.
- New York Times Report of U-117 sinking the SS Sommerstadt
- Gibson, Holbrook C. (1920). "The Diesel Engine of the German Submarine U-117". Pre-1964 SAE Technical Papers. doi:10.4271/200020 – via JSTOR.
