= SM UC-34 =

German Type UC II minelaying U-boat

History

German Empire
- Name: UC-34
- Ordered: 20 November 1915
- Builder: Blohm & Voss, Hamburg
- Yard number: 275
- Launched: 6 May 1916
- Commissioned: 25 September 1916
- Fate: Scuttled at Pola, 30 October 1918

General characteristics
- Class & type: Type UC II submarine
- Displacement: 427 t (420 long tons), surfaced; 509 t (501 long tons), submerged
- Length: 50.35 m (165 ft 2 in) o/a; 40.30 m (132 ft 3 in) pressure hull
- Draught: 3.65 m (12 ft)
- Propulsion: 2 × propeller shafts; 2 × 6-cylinder, 4-stroke diesel engines, 500 bhp (370 kW); 2 × electric motors, 460 shp (340 kW)
- Speed: 11.6 knots (21.5 km/h; 13.3 mph), surfaced; 6.8 knots (12.6 km/h; 7.8 mph), submerged
- Range: 10,180 nmi (18,850 km; 11,710 mi) at 7 knots (13 km/h; 8.1 mph) surfaced; 54 nmi (100 km; 62 mi) at 4 knots (7.4 km/h; 4.6 mph) submerged
- Test depth: 50 m (160 ft)
- Complement: 26
- Armament: 6 × 100 cm (39.4 in) mine tubes; 18 × UC 200 mines; 3 × 50 cm (19.7 in) torpedo tubes (2 bow/external; one stern); 7 × torpedoes; 1 × 8.8 cm (3.5 in) Uk L/30 deck gun
- Notes: 35-second diving time

Service record
- Part of: Pola / Mittelmeer / Mittelmeer II Flotilla; 8 January 1917 – 30 October 1918
- Commanders: Oblt.z.S. Robert Sprenger; 26 September 1916 – 15 July 1917; Oblt.z.S. Horst Obermüller; 16 July 1917 – 14 July 1918; Oblt.z.S. Hans Schüler; 15 July – 30 October 1918
- Operations: 9 patrols
- Victories: 17 merchant ships sunk (51,527 GRT); 1 warship sunk (785 tons); 3 auxiliary warships sunk (13,808 GRT); 3 merchant ships damaged (14,001 GRT)

SM UC-34 was a German Type UC II minelaying submarine or U-boat in the German Imperial Navy (German: Kaiserliche Marine) during World War I. The U-boat was ordered on 20 November 1915 and was launched on 6 May 1916. She was commissioned into the German Imperial Navy on 25 September 1916 as SM UC-34. (Note: "SM" stands for "Seiner Majestät" (English: His Majesty's) and combined with the U for Unterseeboot would be translated as His Majesty's Submarine.) In nine patrols UC-34 was credited with sinking 21 ships, either by torpedo or by mines laid.

On 30 December 1917 under the command of Oberleutnant zur See Horst Obermüller, UC-34 torpedoed the British troop ship HMT Aragon off the Port of Alexandria. Aragon's escort, the destroyer HMS Attack, rescued 300 to 400 survivors but then UC-34 torpedoed and sank her as well. Of 2,500 personnel who had been aboard Aragon, 610 were killed.

UC-34 was scuttled at Pola on 28 October 1918 on the surrender of Austria-Hungary.

== Design ==
A Type UC II submarine, UC-34 had a displacement of 427 tonnes (420 long tons) when at the surface and 509 tonnes (501 long tons) while submerged. She had a length overall of 50.35 m (165 ft 2 in) o/a, a beam of 5.22 m (17 ft 2 in), and a draught of 3.65 m (12 ft). The submarine was powered by two six-cylinder four-stroke diesel engines each producing 300 metric horsepower (220 kW; 300 shp) (a total of 600 metric horsepower (440 kW; 590 shp)), two electric motors producing 460 metric horsepower (340 kW; 450 shp), and two propeller shafts. She had a dive time of 35 seconds and was capable of operating at a depth of 50 metres (160 ft).

The submarine had a maximum surface speed of 11.6 knots (21.5 km/h; 13.3 mph) and a submerged speed of 6.8 knots (12.6 km/h; 7.8 mph). When submerged, she could operate for 54 nautical miles (100 km; 62 mi) at 4 knots (7.4 km/h; 4.6 mph); when surfaced, she could travel 10,180 nautical miles (18,850 km; 11,710 mi) at 7 knots (13 km/h; 8.1 mph). UC-34 was fitted with six 100 centimetres (39 in) mine tubes, eighteen UC 200 mines, three 50 centimetres (20 in) torpedo tubes (one on the stern and two on the bow), seven torpedoes, and one 8.8 cm (3.5 in) Uk L/30 deck gun. Her complement was twenty-six crew members.

== Summary of raiding history ==
Date	Name	Nationality	Tonnage (Note: Merchant ship tonnages are in gross register tons. Military vessels are listed by tons displacement.)	Fate
27 December 1916	Maud	France	176	Sunk
28 December 1916	Seedonis	Russian Empire	284	Sunk
6 April 1917	Rahmanich	Egypt	100	Sunk
6 April 1917	Spithead	United Kingdom	4,697	Sunk
8 April 1917	Geilan Bahri	United Kingdom	19	Sunk
10 April 1917	Fotis	Greece	3,526	Damaged
11 April 1917	Imperial Transport	United Kingdom	4,648	Sunk
4 May 1917	Cameleon	French Navy	179	Sunk
31 May 1917	Ozarda	United Kingdom	4,791	Damaged
2 June 1917	Cameronian	United Kingdom	5,861	Sunk
7 June 1917	Liliana	Kingdom of Italy	70	Sunk
30 June 1917	Caledonien	France	4,140	Sunk
13 September 1917	Bengali	United Kingdom	5,684	Damaged
25 October 1917	Euston	United Kingdom	2,841	Sunk
12 November 1917	Barbary	United Kingdom	4,185	Sunk
30 December 1917	HMT Aragon	Royal Navy	9,588	Sunk
30 December 1917	HMS Attack	Royal Navy	785	Sunk
31 December 1917	HMS Osmanieh	Royal Navy	4,041	Sunk
8 April 1918	Bengali	United Kingdom	5,684	Sunk
9 April 1918	Vasconia	Norway	3,052	Sunk
1 August 1918	Columbia	Denmark	5,570	Sunk
6 August 1918	Clan Macneil	United Kingdom	3,939	Sunk
10 August 1918	Patra	France	45	Sunk
10 August 1918	Tatarrax	United Kingdom	6,216	Sunk
