= SS City of Adelaide (1916) =

Coordinates: 36°23′N 15°33′E

History

United Kingdom
- Name: City of Adelaide
- Namesake: Adelaide
- Owner: Ellerman Lines
- Builder: William Gray & Co., West Hartlepool
- Yard number: 869
- Launched: 26 October 1916
- Commissioned: April 1917
- Home port: Liverpool
- Identification: UK Official Number 137546; Call sign JPGB
- Fate: Sunk, 11 August 1918

General characteristics
- Type: Cargo ship
- Tonnage: 8,389 GRT; 5,457 NRT
- Length: 475 ft 0 in (144.78 m)
- Beam: 58 ft 2 in (17.73 m)
- Depth: 31 ft 7 in (9.63 m)
- Installed power: 758 Nhp
- Propulsion: Central Marine Engineering Works 4-cylinder quadruple expansion
- Speed: 12.0 knots (13.8 mph; 22.2 km/h)

City of Adelaide was a steam cargo ship built in 1916–1917 by the William Gray & Company of West Hartlepool for Ellerman Lines of Liverpool. The ship served in World War I and was torpedoed at 12.10am on Sunday 11 August 1918. Her position was 3623n 1533e and the sinking took place five days after leaving Port Said for Liverpool in a convoy of 20 ships. The crew was saved.
