= SS Pampa =

History

France
- Name: SS Pampa
- Owner: Société Générale de Transport Maritimes
- Builder: London and Glasgow Shipbuilding Company
- Launched: 16 August 1906
- Completed: 1906
- Fate: Torpedoed and sunk on 27 August 1918

General characteristics
- Type: Ocean liner
- Tonnage: 4,471 GRT
- Length: 124.4 m
- Beam: 14.4 m
- Height: 9 m
- Installed power: 531 n.h.p.
- Speed: max. 16 knots
- Capacity: 1st Class : 280 passengers; 2nd Class: 130 passengers; 3rd Class : 900 passengers

SS Pampa was a French ocean liner converted into a troopship in world War I, which was torpedoed and sunk in the Mediterranean Sea 84 nautical miles (156 km) east of Valletta, Malta by SM UC-22 (Imperial German Navy) with the loss of 117 lives.

The Pampa was built as an ocean liner for service between Marseille and South-America. The ship was requisitioned by the Army and converted into a troop ship for use in World War I.

On 27 August 1918, she was sailing with French soldiers on board from Marseille via Bizerte to Thessaloniki in a convoy consisting of 5 other transport ships and 4 destroyers. She was torpedoed at 03:30 by German U-boat SM UC-22, commanded by Eberhard Weichold. She sank at 04:20, 84 nautical miles (156 km) east of Malta, causing the death of 117 soldiers.

== Sources ==
- Pages 14-18 discussions
- Wreck site
- U-boat.net
- The Pampa in the Clydebuilt Ships Database (with image)
