= SM UB-111 =

German submarine

- UB-148 at sea, a U-boat similar to UB-111.

History

German Empire
- Name: UB-111
- Ordered: 6 / 8 February 1917
- Builder: Blohm & Voss, Hamburg
- Cost: 3,714,000 German Papiermark
- Yard number: 317
- Launched: 1 September 1917
- Commissioned: 5 April 1918
- Fate: Surrendered 21 November 1918, broken up

General characteristics
- Class & type: Type UB III submarine
- Displacement: 519 t (511 long tons) surfaced; 649 t (639 long tons) submerged
- Length: 55.30 m (181 ft 5 in) (o/a)
- Beam: 5.80 m (19 ft)
- Draught: 3.70 m (12 ft 2 in)
- Propulsion: 2 × propeller shaft; 2 × MAN-Vulcan four-stroke 6-cylinder diesel engines, 1,085 bhp (809 kW); 2 × Maffei electric motors, 780 shp (580 kW)
- Speed: 13.3 knots (24.6 km/h; 15.3 mph) surfaced; 7.5 knots (13.9 km/h; 8.6 mph) submerged
- Range: 7,420 nmi (13,740 km; 8,540 mi) at 6 knots (11 km/h; 6.9 mph) surfaced; 55 nmi (102 km; 63 mi) at 4 knots (7.4 km/h; 4.6 mph) submerged
- Test depth: 50 m (160 ft)
- Complement: 3 officers, 31 men
- Armament: 5 × 50 cm (19.7 in) torpedo tubes (4 bow, 1 stern); 10 torpedoes; 1 × 8.8 cm (3.46 in) deck gun

Service record
- Part of: Flandern II Flotilla; 27 July – 14 October 1918; II Flotilla; 14 October – 11 November 1918
- Commanders: Oblt.z.S. / Kptlt. Egon von Werner; 5 April – 11 November 1918
- Operations: 3 patrols
- Victories: 7 merchant ships sunk (694 GRT)

SM UB-111 was a German Type UB III submarine or U-boat in the German Imperial Navy (German: Kaiserliche Marine) during World War I. She was commissionedd into the German Imperial Navy on 5 April 1918 as SM UB-111. (Note: "SM" stands for "Seiner Majestät" (English: His Majesty's) and combined with the U for Unterseeboot would be translated as His Majesty's Submarine.)

UB-111 was surrendered to Britain on 21 November 1918 in accordance with the requirements of the Armistice with Germany and broken up in Bo'ness in 1919-20.

== Construction ==
She was built by Blohm & Voss of Hamburg and following just under a year of construction, launched at Hamburg on 1 September 1917. UB-111 was commissioned in the spring the next year under the command of Kptlt. Egon von Werner. Like all Type UB III submarines, UB-111 carried 10 torpedoes and was armed with a 8.8 cm (3.46 in) deck gun. UB-111 would carry a crew of up to 3 officer and 31 men and had a cruising range of 7,420 nautical miles (13,740 km; 8,540 mi). UB-111 had a displacement of 519 t (511 long tons) while surfaced and 649 t (639 long tons) when submerged. Her engines enabled her to travel at 13.3 knots (24.6 km/h; 15.3 mph) when surfaced and 7.4 knots (13.7 km/h; 8.5 mph) when submerged.

== Summary of raiding history ==
Date	Name	Nationality	Tonnage (Note: Tonnages are in gross register tons)	Fate
24 August 1918	Hollandia	Netherlands	103	Sunk
24 August 1918	Majoor Thomson	Netherlands	113	Sunk
24 August 1918	Maria Johanna	Netherlands	126	Sunk
24 August 1918	Neerlandia II	Netherlands	100	Sunk
24 August 1918	Neerlandia III	Netherlands	117	Sunk
24 August 1918	Secunda	Netherlands	30	Sunk
24 August 1918	Stella	Netherlands	105	Sunk

== Bibliography ==
- Bendert, Harald (2000). Die UB-Boote der Kaiserlichen Marine, 1914-1918. Einsätze, Erfolge, Schicksal (in German). Hamburg: Verlag E.S. Mittler & Sohn GmbH. ISBN 3-8132-0713-7.
- Gröner, Erich; Jung, Dieter; Maass, Martin (1991). U-boats and Mine Warfare Vessels. German Warships 1815–1945. Vol. 2. Translated by Thomas, Keith; Magowan, Rachel. London: Conway Maritime Press. ISBN 0-85177-593-4.
- Rössler, Eberhard (1979). U-Bootbau bis Ende des 1. Weltkrieges, Konstruktionen für das Ausland und die Jahre 1935 - 1945 | Die deutschen U-Boote und ihre Werften (in German). Vol. I. Munich: Bernard & Graefe. ISBN 3-7637-5213-7.
