= SM UB-118 =

Coordinates: 50°12′30″N 04°36′00″W

- UB-148 at sea, a U-boat similar to UB-118.

History

German Empire
- Name: UB-118
- Ordered: 6 / 8 February 1917
- Builder: AG Weser, Bremen
- Cost: 3,654,000 German Papiermark
- Yard number: 291
- Laid down: 4 April 1917
- Launched: 13 December 1917
- Commissioned: 22 January 1918
- Fate: Surrendered 20 November 1918, broken up in 1919 / 20

General characteristics
- Class & type: Type UB III submarine
- Displacement: 512 t (504 long tons) surfaced; 643 t (633 long tons) submerged
- Length: 55.85 m (183 ft 3 in) (o/a)
- Beam: 5.80 m (19 ft)
- Draught: 3.72 m (12 ft 2 in)
- Propulsion: 2 × propeller shaft; 2 × Daimler four-stroke 6-cylinder diesel engines, 1,050 bhp (780 kW); 2 × Siemens-Schuckert electric motors, 780 shp (580 kW)
- Speed: 13.9 knots (25.7 km/h; 16.0 mph) surfaced; 7.6 knots (14.1 km/h; 8.7 mph) submerged
- Range: 7,280 nmi (13,480 km; 8,380 mi) at 6 knots (11 km/h; 6.9 mph) surfaced; 55 nmi (102 km; 63 mi) at 4 knots (7.4 km/h; 4.6 mph) submerged
- Test depth: 50 m (160 ft)
- Complement: 3 officers, 31 men
- Armament: 5 × 50 cm (19.7 in) torpedo tubes (4 bow, 1 stern); 10 torpedoes; 1 × 8.8 cm (3.46 in) deck gun

Service record
- Part of: III Flotilla; 26 March – 11 November 1918
- Commanders: Kptlt. Hermann Arthur Krauß; 22 January – 11 November 1918
- Operations: 5 patrols
- Victories: 5 merchant ships sunk (19,902 GRT)

SM UB-118 was a German Type UB III submarine or U-boat in the German Imperial Navy (German: Kaiserliche Marine) during World War I. She was commissioned into the German Imperial Navy on 22 January 1918 as SM UB-118. (Note: "SM" stands for "Seiner Majestät" (English: His Majesty's) and combined with the U for Unterseeboot would be translated as His Majesty's Submarine.)

UB-118 was surrendered to the Allies at Harwich on 21 November 1918 in accordance with the requirements of the Armistice with Germany. She was allocated to British explosive trials at Falmouth (see UB-86, UB-97, UC-92, UB-106, UB-112 and UB-128), but began to take water while in tow from Devonport to Falmouth, and was therefore sunk by her escort on 21 November 1920.

== Construction ==
She was built by AG Weser of Bremen and following just under a year of construction, launched at Bremen on 13 December 1917. UB-118 was commissioned early the next year under the command of Kptlt. Hermann Arthur Krauß. Like all Type UB III submarines, UB-118 carried 10 torpedoes and was armed with a 8.8 cm (3.46 in) deck gun. UB-118 would carry a crew of up to 3 officers and 31 men and had a cruising range of 7,280 nautical miles (13,480 km; 8,380 mi). UB-118 had a displacement of 512 t (504 long tons) while surfaced and 643 t (633 long tons) when submerged. Her engines enabled her to travel at 13.9 knots (25.7 km/h; 16.0 mph) when surfaced and 7.6 knots (14.1 km/h; 8.7 mph) when submerged.

== Summary of raiding history ==
Date	Name	Nationality	Tonnage (Note: Tonnages are in gross register tons)	Fate
16 May 1918	Yturri Bide	Spain	582	Sunk
7 July 1918	Carl	Denmark	2,486	Sunk
27 August 1918	Ant Cassar	United Kingdom	3,544	Sunk
1 September 1918	City of Glasgow	United Kingdom	6,457	Sunk
1 September 1918	Mesaba	United Kingdom	6,833	Sunk

== Bibliography ==
- Bendert, Harald (2000). Die UB-Boote der Kaiserlichen Marine, 1914-1918. Einsätze, Erfolge, Schicksal (in German). Hamburg: Verlag E.S. Mittler & Sohn GmbH. ISBN 3-8132-0713-7.
- Gröner, Erich; Jung, Dieter; Maass, Martin (1991). U-boats and Mine Warfare Vessels. German Warships 1815–1945. Vol. 2. Translated by Thomas, Keith; Magowan, Rachel. London: Conway Maritime Press. ISBN 0-85177-593-4.
- Rössler, Eberhard (1979). Die deutschen U-Boote und ihre Werften: eine Bilddokumentation über den deutschen U-Bootbau; in zwei Bänden (in German). Vol. I. Munich: Bernard & Graefe. ISBN 3-7637-5213-7.
