= List of shipwrecks in October 1918 =

The list of shipwrecks in October 1918 includes ships sunk, foundered, grounded, or otherwise lost during October 1918.

== 1 October ==
List of shipwrecks: 1 October 1918
Ship	State	Description
Aldebaran	Sweden	World War I: The cargo ship was torpedoed and sunk in the Atlantic Ocean 7 nautical miles (13 km) off the Wolf Rock, Cornwall, United Kingdom (49°54′N 5°59′W) by SM UB-112 (Imperial German Navy) with the loss of all nineteen crew.
Bylands	United Kingdom	World War I: The cargo ship was shelled and sunk in the Atlantic Ocean 150 nautical miles (280 km) north-northwest of Cape Villano, Spain by SM U-139 (Imperial German Navy). Her crew survived.
Francoli	Spain	World War I: The cargo ship was shelled and sunk in the Mediterranean Sea 14 nautical miles (26 km) east of Cape Palos, Murcia by SM UB-49 (Imperial German Navy). Her fourteen crew were rescued by a French merchant vessel.
Giuseppino M.	Italy	World War I: The sailing vessel was sunk in the Gulf of Salerno by SM UC-53 (Imperial German Navy).
Gjertrud	Norway	World War I: The coaster was sunk in the Atlantic Ocean 2 nautical miles (3.7 km) west of The Lizard, Cornwall by SM UB-112 (Imperial German Navy) with the loss of eleven of her crew.
Manin	Italy	World War I: The cargo ship was sunk in the Atlantic Ocean 150 nautical miles (280 km) north north west of Cape Villano by SM U-139 (Imperial German Navy).
Montfort	United Kingdom	World War I: Convoy OD 128: The cargo ship was torpedoed and damaged in the Atlantic Ocean 170 nautical miles (310 km) west south west of the Bishop Rock, Isles of Scilly (48°00′N 10°20′W) by SM U-55 (Imperial German Navy) with the loss of five crew. She sank the next day.
S. Giuseppe A.	Italy	World War I: The sailing vessel was sunk in the Gulf of Salerno by SM UC-53 (Imperial German Navy).
USS SC-60	United States Navy	The submarine chaser sank in 45 feet (14 m) of water after colliding with the tanker Fred W. Waller (United States) off New York City. Two members of her crew were killed.
Thèrese et Marthe	France	World War I: The fishing vessel was sunk in the Bay of Biscay (46°36′N 2°38′W) by SM U-91 (Imperial German Navy).
Vanya	Soviet Navy Red Movement	Russian Civil War: The gunboat was shelled by artillery and White ships, plus fired on by infantry, and sunk on the Kama River. 30 crewman were killed including her commanding officer, 48 were rescued.

== 2 October ==
List of shipwrecks: 2 October 1918
Ship	State	Description
HMS Arca	Royal Navy	World War I: The tanker was torpedoed and sunk in the Atlantic Ocean 40 nautical miles (74 km) north west by west of Tory Island, County Donegal (55°45′N 7°35′W) by SM U-118 (Imperial German Navy) with the loss of 52 crew.
Avé Marie Stella	France	World War I: The fishing vessel was shelled and sunk in the Bay of Biscay (45°59′N 2°14′W) by SM U-91 (Imperial German Navy).
Bamse	United Kingdom	World War I: The cargo ship was torpedoed and sunk in the English Channel 5 nautical miles (9.3 km) east of The Lizard, Cornwall by SM UB-112 (Imperial German Navy) with the loss of eleven of her crew.
Keltier	Belgium	World War I: The cargo ship was torpedoed and sunk in the Atlantic Ocean (46°16′N 9°52′W) by U-55 (Imperial German Navy). The crew took to the lifeboats but were not recovered.
Maia	France	World War I: The schooner was shelled and sunk in the Bay of Biscay (45°25′N 1°48′W) by SM U-91 (Imperial German Navy) with the loss of two of her crew.
Marie Emmanuel	France	World War I: The fishing vessel was shelled and sunk in the Bay of Biscay south of the Île d'Yeu, Finistère (46°33′N 2°23′W) by SM U-91 (Imperial German Navy) with the loss of five of her crew.
Pioneer	United States	With no one on board, the 12-gross register ton, 45.9-foot (14.0 m) motor vessel was wrecked on Katalla Bar, a shoal off Katalla, Territory of Alaska. The wreck was not reported until 1926.
Poljames	United Kingdom	World War I: The coaster was torpedoed and sunk in the English Channel 6 nautical miles (11 km) south of The Lizard by SM UB-112 (Imperial German Navy) with the loss of thirteen of her crew.
Rio Cávado	Portugal	World War I: The sailing vessel was sunk in the Atlantic Ocean 290 nautical miles (540 km) off Cape Prior, Spain by SM U-139 (Imperial German Navy).
SMS Z	Imperial German Navy	World War I: The barracks ship was scuttled at Bruges, West Flanders, Belgium.

== 3 October ==
List of shipwrecks: 3 October 1918
Ship	State	Description
Alberto Treves	Italy	World War I: The cargo ship was sunk in the Atlantic Ocean 300 nautical miles (560 km) off the coast of the United States by SM U-155 (Imperial German Navy).
Ariel	United Kingdom	World War I: Convoy BG 68: The cargo ship was torpedoed and sunk in the Mediterranean Sea 54 nautical miles (100 km) north of Cape Ténès, Algeria (37°36′N 1°08′E) by SM UB-105 (Imperial German Navy). Her crew survived.
Atlantis	Norway	World War I: The cargo ship was sunk in the English Channel 6 nautical miles (11 km) south east of The Lizard, Cornwall, United Kingdom by SM UB-112 (Imperial German Navy) with the loss of two of her crew.
Blasios	Greece	World War I: The sailing vessel was sunk in the Aegean Sea by SM UC-23 (Imperial German Navy).
Burutu	United Kingdom	The ocean liner collided with another vessel and sank with heavy loss of life, at least 170 people were killed.
Eupion	United Kingdom	World War I: The tanker was torpedoed and sunk in the River Shannon by SM UB-90 (Imperial German Navy) with the loss of eleven of her crew.
SMS G41	Imperial German Navy	World War I: The V25-class torpedo boat was scuttled at Bruges, West Flanders, Belgium.
USS Herman Frasch	United States Navy	The collier collided with USS George G. Henry (United States Navy) in the Atlantic Ocean 110 nautical miles (200 km) east of Cape Sable Island, Nova Scotia, Canada and sank with the loss of 24 of her 89 crew.
Lake City	United States	The steamer was sunk in a collision with James McGee (United States) off American Shoal Light. Her master and 29 crewmen killed.
HMT Lustring	Royal Navy	The naval trawler was lost on this date.
SMS M	Imperial German Navy	World War I: The barracks ship was scuttled at Bruges.
SMS S33	Imperial German Navy	World War I: The V25-class torpedo boat was torpedoed and sunk in the North Sea by HMS L10 (Royal Navy).
SMS S34	Imperial German Navy	World War I: The V25-class torpedo boat struck a mine and sank in the North Sea with the loss of 70 of her crew.
Saint Luc	France	World War I: Convoy BG 68: The cargo ship was torpedoed and sunk in the Mediterranean Sea 48 nautical miles (89 km) north of Cape Ténès (37°43′N 1°35′E) by SM UB-105 (Imperial German Navy) with the loss of 29 of her crew.
SMS V74	Imperial German Navy	World War I: The V25-class destroyer was scuttled at Bruges.
Westwood	United Kingdom	World War I: The collier was torpedoed and sunk in the Atlantic Ocean 5 nautical miles (9.3 km) south west of The Lizard by SM UB-112 (Imperial German Navy) with the loss of a crew member.

== 4 October ==
List of shipwrecks: 4 October 1918
Ship	State	Description
HMT Coleus	Royal Navy	The naval trawler was lost on this date.
USS Herman Frasch	United States Navy	The collier was sunk in a collision with the United States Navy chartered tanker George D. Henry (United States) 150 miles (240 km) south east of Nova Scotia. 24 people were killed and 36 rescued.
Hirano Maru	Japan	World War I: The passenger ship was sunk in the Atlantic Ocean 200 nautical miles (370 km) south of Ireland by SM UB-91 (Imperial German Navy) with the loss of 292 of the 320 people on board. Some of the deceased were buried at Angle, Pembrokeshire, Wales. Many of the deceased were children.
Industrial	United Kingdom	World War I: The schooner was scuttled in the Atlantic Ocean 250 nautical miles (460 km) south east of Nantucket Island, Massachusetts, United States (37°57′N 66°41′W) by SM U-155 (Imperial German Navy). Her crew survived.
SMS Johs. Thode	Imperial German Navy	The Vorpostenboot was lost on this date.
Kassid Karim	Egypt	World War I: The sailing vessel was shelled and sunk in the Mediterranean Sea 75 nautical miles (139 km) north of Alexandria by an enemy submarine.
HMS L10	Royal Navy	World War I: The L-class submarine was sunk in the Heligoland Bight by SMS V28 and SMS V79 (both Imperial German Navy) with the loss of all 38 crew.
Mercedes	Spain	World War I: The cargo ship was sunk in the Atlantic Ocean off San Sebastián, Gipuzkoa (43°25′N 1°59′W) by SM U-91 (Imperial German Navy). Her crew survived.
HMS M. J. Hedley	Royal Navy	The Q-ship capsized and sank on this date.
Nanna	Norway	World War I: The cargo ship was sunk in the Atlantic Ocean 10 nautical miles (19 km) west north west of The Lizard, Cornwall, United Kingdom by SM UB-112 (Imperial German Navy) with the loss of nine of her crew.
Oceania	Austria-Hungary	The ship struck a mine in the Adriatic Sea off Cape Rodoni, Albania and was abandoned. The wreck was torpedoed and sunk by 16 (Austro-Hungarian Navy).
Oopack	United Kingdom	World War I: The cargo ship was torpedoed and sunk in the Mediterranean Sea 110 nautical miles (200 km) east of Malta (35°56′N 16°20′E) by SM UB-68 (Imperial German Navy). Her crew survived.
San Saba	United States	World War I: The cargo ship struck a mine and sank in the Atlantic Ocean off the Barnegat Lighthouse, New Jersey (39°40′N 73°55′W) with the loss of 30 crew.
SM UB-68	Imperial German Navy	World War I: The Type UB III submarine was shelled and sunk in the Mediterranean Sea (33°56′N 16°20′E) with the loss of one of her 34 crew.
Uranus	Russia	World War I: The brigantine was scuttled in the Atlantic Ocean south west of the Isles of Scilly, United Kingdom (46°42′N 12°23′W by SM U-55 (Imperial German Navy). Her crew took to the lifeboats, but were not recovered.

== 5 October ==
List of shipwrecks: 5 October 1918
Ship	State	Description
Bremerhaven	Imperial German Navy	World War I: The Greta-class Vorpostenboot was sunk by four Royal Navy torpedo boats 119 nautical miles (220 km; 137 mi) off Helgoland.
Erindring	United Kingdom	World War I: The cargo ship was sunk in the Bay of Biscay (43°27′N 2°24′W) by SM U-91 (Imperial German Navy) with the loss of all 22 crew.
Gelderland	Germany	World War I: The cargo ship was scuttled at Bruges, West Flanders, Belgium.
Hagios Marcos	Greece	World War I: The sailing vessel was sunk in the Gulf of Salonica by SM UC-23 (Imperial German Navy).
Heathpark	United Kingdom	World War I: The cargo ship was sunk in the Bay of Biscay (43°27′N 2°18′W) by SM U-91 (Imperial German Navy) with the loss of all eighteen crew.
Maria	Spain	World War I: The schooner was torpedoed and sunk in the Gulf of Salonica.
Maria	Spain	World War I: The cargo ship was sunk in the Gulf of Salonica (39°58′N 23°07′E) by SM UC-23 (Imperial German Navy). Her crew survived.
Marigo	France	World War I: The sailing vessel was sunk in the Gulf of Salonica by SM UC-23 (Imperial German Navy).
USS Mary Alice	United States Navy	The patrol vessel was rammed and sunk in the long Island Sound off Bridgeport, Connecticut by USS O-13 (United States Navy). Her crew were rescued by USS O-13.
Reventazon	United Kingdom	World War I: The cargo ship was torpedoed and sunk in the Gulf of Salonica 14 nautical miles (26 km) west by south of Kassandra Point, Greece by SM UC-23 (Imperial German Navy) with the loss of fifteen of her crew.
Rio Pardo	Germany	World War I: The cargo ship was scuttled at Bruges.
SMS T122	Imperial German Navy	World War I: The S90-class torpedo boat struck a mine and sank in the North Sea with the loss of twelve of her crew.
SM UB-10	Imperial German Navy	World War I: The Type UB I submarine was scuttled in the North Sea off Zeebrugge, West Flanders, Belgium (51°21′N 3°12′E).
SM UB-40	Imperial German Navy	World War I: The Type UB II submarine was scuttled in the North Sea off Ostend, West Flanders, Belgium.
SM UB-59	Imperial German Navy	World War I: The Type UB III submarine was scuttled in the North Sea off Zeebrugge (51°19′N 3°12′E).
SM UC-4	Imperial German Navy	World War I: The Type UC I submarine was scuttled in the North Sea off the coast of West Flanders (51°22′N 3°12′E).

== 6 October ==
List of shipwrecks: 6 October 1918
Ship	State	Description
HMS C12	Royal Navy	The C-class submarine collided with a destroyer in the Humber Estuary and sank. She was subsequently raised, repaired and returned to service.
HMS Otranto	Royal Navy	The armed merchant cruiser collided with HMS Kashmir (Royal Navy) in the Atlantic Ocean northeast of Ireland and was holed. She was driven ashore and wrecked with the loss of 431 lives.

== 7 October ==
List of shipwrecks: 7 October 1918
Ship	State	Description
HMT Kalmia	Royal Navy	The naval trawler was lost in the Mediterranean Sea on this date.
Madeira	Portugal	World War I: The cargo ship was sunk in the Mediterranean Sea off San Pietro Island, Italy by SM UB-105 (Imperial German Navy). Her crew survived.
HMT Ocean Foam	Royal Navy	The naval trawler was lost on this date.
Saint Barnabe	France	World War I: The cargo ship was sunk in the Mediterranean Sea 38 nautical miles (70 km) east of San Pietro Island by SM UB-105 (Imperial German Navy).
Trud	Russian Navy White Movement	Russian Civil War: The gunboat was sunk on the Kama River by mines.
USS West Gate	United States Navy	The cargo ship collided with USS American (United States Navy) in the Atlantic Ocean 250 nautical miles (460 km) south east of Halifax, Nova Scotia, Canada and sank with the loss of seven crew.

== 8 October ==
List of shipwrecks: 8 October 1918
Ship	State	Description
Cazengo	Portugal	World War I: The cargo ship was sunk in the Bay of Biscay off Saint-Jean-de-Luz, Basses-Pyrénées, France (44°16′N 1°20′W) by SM U-91 (Imperial German Navy). Her crew survived.
Hawanee	United Kingdom	World War I: The schooner was scuttled in the Atlantic Ocean 350 nautical miles (650 km) off Cape Finisterre, Spain (42°55′N 7°41′W) by SM U-157 (Imperial German Navy). Her crew survived.
Thalia	United Kingdom	World War I: The cargo ship was torpedoed and sunk in the North Sea 4 nautical miles (7.4 km) east south east of Filey, Yorkshire by SM UC-17 (Imperial German Navy) with the loss of three of her crew.

== 9 October ==
List of shipwrecks: 9 October 1918
Ship	State	Description
Pierre	France	World War I: The three-masted schooner was shelled and sunk in the Bay of Biscay (43°49′N 1°34′W) by SM U-91 (Imperial German Navy). Her crew survived.
USS SC-219	United States Navy	The SC-1-class submarine chaser sank in the mid-Atlantic Ocean between Bermuda and the Azores due to an explosion and fire while refueling alongside USS Chestnut Hill. 4 people were killed, and 8 wounded.

== 10 October ==
List of shipwrecks: 10 October 1918
Ship	State	Description
André	France	World War I: The sailing vessel was shelled and sunk in the Atlantic Ocean west of the Isles of Scilly, United Kingdom by SM U-55 (Imperial German Navy).
Leinster	United Kingdom	World War I: The troopship was torpedoed and sunk in the Irish Sea (53°19′N 5°47′W) by SM UB-123 (Imperial German Navy) with the loss of 523 lives. Survivors were rescued by HMY Helga, HMS Lively, HMS Mallard, HMS Seal (all Royal Navy).
SMS Senator Schroder	Imperial German Navy	World War I: The Vorpostenboot was scuttled at Ostend, West Flanders, Belgium.

== 11 October ==
List of shipwrecks: 11 October 1918
Ship	State	Description
Luksefjell	Norway	World War I: The cargo ship was sunk in the Bay of Biscay 8 nautical miles (15 km) west north west of Capbreton, Landes, France (43°41′N 1°37′W) by SM U-91 (Imperial German Navy) with the loss of seven of her crew.
Maja	Sweden	World War I: The cargo ship was sunk in the Irish Sea 15 nautical miles (28 km) east of Ardglass, County Down, United Kingdom by SM UB-126 (Imperial German Navy) with the loss of nine of her crew.

== 12 October ==
List of shipwrecks: 12 October 1918
Ship	State	Description
USAT Amphion	United States Army	World War I: The troopship was shelled and damaged in the Atlantic Ocean (36°06′N 62°59′W) by SM U-155 (Imperial German Navy). with the loss of two of her crew.
Laila	Norway	World War I: The cargo ship was torpedoed and sunk in the Irish Sea 6.5 nautical miles (12.0 km) north of the Mull of Galloway, Wigtownshire, United Kingdom by SM UB-126 (Imperial German Navy) with the loss of seventeen of her crew
Ohio	Sweden	World War I: The cargo ship collided with another vessel and sank in the English Channel while in convoy. All 21 people on board were rescued by a Royal Navy destroyer, but one of the crew later died in hospital.
Tripoli II	Italy	World War I: The cargo ship was sunk in the Mediterranean Sea 20 nautical miles (37 km) off Cape Passero, Sicily by SM UB-105 (Imperial German Navy).

== 13 October ==
List of shipwrecks: 13 October 1918
Ship	State	Description
Aghion Spiridon	Greece	World War I: The sailing vessel was sunk in the Gulf of Salonica by SM UC-23 (Imperial German Navy).
Aghios Georgios	Greece	World War I: The sailing vessel was sunk in the Gulf of Salonica by SM UC-23 (Imperial German Navy).
Bioletta	Greece	World War I: The sailing vessel was sunk in the Gulf of Salonica by SM UC-23 (Imperial German Navy).
Evangelistria	Greece	World War I: The sailing vessel was sunk in the Gulf of Salonica by SM UC-23 (Imperial German Navy).
Evangelistrios	Greece	World War I: The sailing vessel was sunk in the Gulf of Salonica by SM UC-23 (Imperial German Navy).
Glaros	Greece	World War I: The sailing vessel was sunk in the Gulf of Salonica by SM UC-23 (Imperial German Navy).
Hamidieh	Egypt	World War I: the sailing vessel was shelled and sunk in the Mediterranean Sea 50 nautical miles (93 km) north west of Alexandria by an enemy submarine.
Iphigenia	Greece	World War I: The sailing vessel was sunk in the Gulf of Salonica by SM UC-23 (Imperial German Navy). Her crew survived.
Panaghia	Greece	World War I: The sailing vessel was sunk in the Gulf of Salonica by SM UC-23 (Imperial German Navy). Her crew survived.
Urania	Greece	World War I: The sailing vessel was sunk in the Gulf of Salonica by SM UC-23 (Imperial German Navy).

== 14 October ==
List of shipwrecks: 14 October 1918
Ship	State	Description
NRP Augusto de Castilho	Portuguese Navy	World War I: The naval trawler was sunk in the Atlantic Ocean 100 nautical miles (190 km) south west of the Azores by SM U-139 (Imperial German Navy).
Bayard	France	World War I: The fishing vessel was sunk in the Bay of Biscay (47°30′N 4°00′W) by SM U-91 (Imperial German Navy).
Dundalk	United Kingdom	World War I: The passenger ship was torpedoed and sunk in the Irish Sea 5 nautical miles (9.3 km) north north west of The Skerries, Isle of Anglesey by SM U-90 (Imperial German Navy) with the loss of 21 lives.
SMS M22	Imperial German Navy	World War I: The M1-class minesweeper was sunk by mines in the North Sea.
Stifinder	Norway	Stifinder World War I: The barque was scuttled in the Atlantic Ocean (37°42′N 53°41′W) by SM U-152 (Imperial German Navy). Her crew survived.

== 15 October ==
List of shipwrecks: 15 October 1918
Ship	State	Description
USS America	United States Navy	The cargo liner/troop ship sank at Hoboken, New Jersey. Raised, repaired and returned to service.
Bretagne	France	World War I: The sailing vessel was sunk in the Atlantic Ocean by SM U-43 (Imperial German Navy). Her crew survived.
HM CMB-71A	Royal Navy	The Coastal Motor Boat was lost on this date.
Evangelistria	Greece	World War I: The sailing vessel was sunk in the Gulf of Salonica (38°39′N 25°13′E) by SM UC-23 (Imperial German Navy).
Georgios	Greece	World War I: The sailing vessel was sunk in the Gulf of Salonica (38°42′N 25°21′E) by SM UC-23 (Imperial German Navy).
HMS J6	Royal Navy	World War I: The J-class submarine was shelled and sunk in the North Sea off the coast of Northumberland by the Q-ship HMS Cymric (Royal Navy), which mistook her pennant number J6 for U6 and assumed she was a U-boat. Fifteen of her 45 crew were lost.
Maria	Greece	World War I: The sailing vessel was sunk in the Gulf of Salonica (38°42′N 25°21′E) by SM UC-23 (Imperial German Navy). Her crew survived.

== 16 October ==
List of shipwrecks: 16 October 1918
Ship	State	Description
Dumaru	United States	The cargo ship was struck by lightning, caught fire and sank in the Pacific Ocean 22 miles (35 km) west of Guam whilst on her maiden voyage. 19 crewmen killed. Her captain and four crew were rescued.
Pentwyn	United Kingdom	World War I: The cargo ship was torpedoed and sunk in the Irish Sea 20 nautical miles (37 km) north east by north of the Smalls Lighthouse by SM U-90 (Imperial German Navy) with the loss of a crew member.
SM UB-90	Imperial German Navy	World War I: The Type UB III submarine was torpedoed and sunk in the Skagerrak (57°55′N 10°27′E) by HMS L12 (Royal Navy) with the loss of all 38 crew.
War Council	United Kingdom	World War I: The cargo ship was torpedoed and sunk in the Mediterranean Sea 85 nautical miles (157 km) west south west of Cape Matapan, Greece (35°44′N 20°16′E) by SM U-63 (Imperial German Navy). Her crew survived.

== 17 October ==
List of shipwrecks: 17 October 1918
Ship	State	Description
Bonvilston	United Kingdom	World War I: The cargo ship was torpedoed and sunk in the Irish Sea 9.5 nautical miles (17.6 km) north west by west of Corsewall Point, Wigtownshire by SM UB-92 (Imperial German Navy). Her crew survived.
Lucia	United States	World War I: The cargo ship was torpedoed and sunk in the Atlantic Ocean 1,200 nautical miles (2,200 km) off the coast of the United States (38°50′N 50°50′W) by SM U-155 (Imperial German Navy) with the loss of four of her crew. USS Fairfax (United States Navy) rescued 86 survivors.

== 18 October ==
List of shipwrecks: 18 October 1918
Ship	State	Description
Hunsdon	United Kingdom	World War I: The cargo ship was torpedoed and sunk in the Irish Sea (54°19′N 5°27′W) by SM UB-94 (Imperial German Navy) with the loss of a crew member.
RFA Industry	Royal Navy	World War I: The cargo ship was sunk in the Irish Sea by SM UB-92 (Imperial German Navy) with the loss of 21 of her crew.
Linz	Austria-Hungary	World War I: The passenger ship struck a mine and sank off Cape Rodoni, Albania. Around 600 people were killed in the sinking.
Njordur	(Denmark) Iceland	World War I: The 133.5-foot (40.7 m), 286-ton steam trawler was shelled and sunk in the Atlantic Ocean 25 miles (40 km) southwest of St Kilda (57°02′N 10°58′W) by SM U-122 (Imperial German Navy). The crew escaped in two lifeboats and were picked up by HM trawler Lord Lister (Royal Navy) 61 hours later off Tory Island.
Oceana	United Kingdom	The Admiralty tug was run into and sunk in Scapa Flow, Orkney Islands by Stobo Castle (United Kingdom).
SM U-34	Imperial German Navy	World War I: The Type U 31 submarine departed on patrol. Subsequently sunk off Gibraltar on or before 9 November with the loss of all 38 crew.
Voltaire	French Navy	World War I: The Danton-class battleship was torpedoed and damaged in the Aegean Sea of Milos, Greece by SM UB-48 (Imperial German Navy).
West Oil	United States	The tanker burned at Genoa, Italy. Later salvaged.

== 19 October ==
List of shipwrecks: 19 October 1918
Ship	State	Description
Aida	Portugal	World War I: The sailing vessel was sunk in the Atlantic Ocean off Brest, Finistère, France by SM U-43 (Imperial German Navy). Her crew survived.
Almerian	United Kingdom	World War I: The cargo ship struck a mine and sank in the Mediterranean Sea 13 nautical miles (24 km) off Licata, Sicily (37°11′N 13°39′E). Her crew survived.
John B. Astell	United States	The tug sank at the Quartermasters Pier, South Boston, Massachusetts.
HMS Plumpton	Royal Navy	World War I: The Racecourse-class minesweeper struck a mine and was damaged in the North Sea off Ostend, West Flanders, Belgium. She was beached but was declared a total loss.
USS Simplicity	United States Navy	The motor boat was crushed by Barge No. 78 (United States) while tied up alongside an Army dock at Fort Wadsworth, New York.
SM UB-123	Imperial German Navy	World War I: The Type UB III submarine struck a mine and sank in the North Sea with the loss of all 36 crew.

== 20 October ==
List of shipwrecks: 20 October 1918
Ship	State	Description
Emily Millington	United Kingdom	World War I: The schooner was shelled and sunk in the Atlantic Ocean 13 nautical miles (24 km) north north east of the Bishop Rock, Isles of Scilly by SM UB-92 (Imperial German Navy). Her crew survived.
HMS M21	Royal Navy	World War I: The M15-class monitor struck a mine in the North Sea off Ostend, West Flanders, Belgium. She was taken in tow but sank in the English Channel off Dover, Kent.
Yenrut	United States	The freighter foundered in a severe storm in the Atlantic Ocean east of Watlings Island (25°00′N 72°15′W). Five crewmen were killed.

== 21 October ==
List of shipwrecks: 21 October 1918
Ship	State	Description
USS Cero	United States Navy	The patrol vessel was destroyed by fire in Narragansett Bay 50 feet (15 m) west of Bishop's Rock and about 500 yards (460 m) west of Coasters Harbor Island. Her crew were rescued.
USS Lake Borgne	United States Navy	The cargo ship struck a rock and sank near Mathieu Point, France.
HMML 561	Royal Navy	The motor launch was lost on this date.
Moscow	United Kingdom	Russian Revolution: The cargo ship was scuttled at Petrograd to prevent her capture by Bolshevik forces.
Saint Barchan	United Kingdom	World War I: The coaster was torpedoed and sunk in the Irish Sea 4 nautical miles (7.4 km) off St John's Point, County Down by SM UB-94 (Imperial German Navy) with the loss of eight of her crew.
SM UB-89	Imperial German Navy	The Type UB III submarine collided with SMS Frankfurt (Imperial German Navy) at Kiel, Schleswig-Holstein (54°21′N 10°10′E) and sank with the loss of seven lives. She was raised on 30 October.

== 23 October ==
List of shipwrecks: 23 October 1918
Ship	State	Description
Aghios Gerasimos	Greece	World War I: The sailing vessel was sunk in the Mediterranean Sea south of Crete (34°00′N 25°31′E) by SM UC-74 (Imperial German Navy).
HMS D1	Royal Navy	The decommissioned D-class submarine was sunk as a target.
J. H. Rutter	United States	The sail barge was sunk in a collision with USS Texan (United States Navy) in the North River.

== 25 October ==
List of shipwrecks: 25 October 1918
Ship	State	Description
Princess Sophia	Canada	Princess Sophia on the reef on 24 October. She sank the next day. After grounding on Vanderbilt Reef in Lynn Canal near Juneau, Territory of Alaska, in a heavy snowstorm on 24 October, the passenger ship sank with loss of all 343 people on board.

== 26 October ==
List of shipwrecks: 26 October 1918
Ship	State	Description
Scow No. 2	United States	The scow sank in Chelsea Creek at Charlestown, Massachusetts.

== 27 October ==
List of shipwrecks: 27 October 1918
Ship	State	Description
HMT Calceolaria	Royal Navy	World War I: The naval trawler struck a mine and sank in the North Sea off the Elbow Lightship (United Kingdom) (51°26′N 1°36′E) with the loss of five of her crew.
Chaparra	Cuba	World War I: Carrying a cargo of 2,000 tons of sugar, the 1,510-gross register ton cargo ship struck a mine laid by the submarine SM U-117 (Imperial German Navy) in 80 feet (24 m) of water in the Atlantic Ocean of the coast of New Jersey, United States, 70 nautical miles (130 km; 81 mi) southeast of the Barnegat Lighthouse and 10 nautical miles (19 km; 12 mi) off Barnegat. She sank in five minutes with the loss of six of her crew. Her 23 survivors reached Barnegat in her boats.
HMS George R. Gray	Royal Navy	The tug was lost on this date.
Maria Emilia	Portugal	The barque sprang a leak in the Atlantic Ocean (30°20′N 66°12′W) and was abandoned by her crew. They were rescued by Themistocles ( Greece).
HMT Neptunian	Royal Navy	The 135.2-foot (41.2 m), 315-ton steam minesweeping naval trawler collided with naval trawler HMT Lord Lister (Royal Navy) and sank in the Atlantic Ocean 5 miles (8.0 km) north northwest of Altacarry lighthouse, Rathlin Island, County Donegal, Ireland. Eight survivors were rescued by Lord Lister.
SM U-78	Imperial German Navy	World War I: The Type UE I submarine was torpedoed and sunk in the Skagerrak (56°02′N 5°08′E) by HMS G2 (Royal Navy) with the loss of all 40 crew.

== 28 October ==
List of shipwrecks: 28 October 1918
Ship	State	Description
Maj	Sweden	The cargo ship ran aground at Haar-om-Jaederen. She was declared a total loss on 2 November.
USS Tarantula	United States Navy	The naval yacht/patrol boat collided with the steamer Frisia (Netherlands) in the Atlantic Ocean 8 nautical miles (15 km; 9.2 mi) off the Fire Island Lightship ( United States Coast Guard) and sank in 115 feet (35 m) of water.
SM U-47	Imperial German Navy	World War I: The Type U 43 submarine was scuttled at Pula, Austria-Hungary (44°52′N 13°50′E).
SM U-65	Imperial German Navy	World War I: The Type U 63 submarine was scuttled at Pula (44°52′N 13°50′E).
SM UB-48	Imperial German Navy	World War I: The Type UB II submarine was scuttled at Pula (44°52′N 13°50′E).
SM UB-116	Imperial German Navy	World War I: The Type UB III submarine struck a mine and was then depth charged and sunk off Scapa Flow, the Orkney Islands, United Kingdom with the loss of all 36 crew. Wreck blown up 1975.
SM UC-25	Imperial German Navy	World War I: The Type UC II submarine was scuttled at Pula (44°52′N 13°50′E).
SM UC-53	Imperial German Navy	World War I: The Type UC II submarine was scuttled at Pula (44°52′N 13°50′E).
SM UC-54	Imperial German Navy	World War I: The Type UC II submarine was scuttled at Trieste, Italy (45°39′N 13°45′E).

== 29 October ==
List of shipwrecks: 29 October 1918
Ship	State	Description
SMS A51	Imperial German Navy	World War I: The A26-class torpedo boat was scuttled at Rijeka, Kingdom of Serbs, Croats, and Slovenes.
SMS A82	Imperial German Navy	World War I: The A56-class torpedo boat was scuttled at Rijeka.
HMT Falkirk	Royal Navy	The naval trawler was lost on this date.
HMT Thomas Cornwall	Royal Navy	The Mersey-class trawler collided with another vessel and sank in the North Sea off Filey, Yorkshire with the loss of twenty of her crew.
HMS Ulysses	Royal Navy	The R-class destroyer collided with Ellerie (United Kingdom) and sank in the Firth of Clyde.

== 30 October ==
List of shipwrecks: 30 October 1918
Ship	State	Description
HMCS Galiano	Royal Canadian Navy	World War I: The Canadian patrol vessel was lost in a storm in Barkley Sound, British Columbia.
Neptune	United States	While under tow from Seattle, Washington, to Tyee, Territory of Alaska, with a cargo of 27,500 pounds (12,500 kg) of salted herring, salt, and barrels, the 365-ton barge drifted onto rocks, was stranded, and then sank 4 nautical miles (7.4 km; 4.6 mi) north of Gambier Island (57°26′30″N 133°51′00″W) in Southeast Alaska after her towline parted in a gale. Her crew of nine survived.
SM U-73	Imperial German Navy	World War I: The Type UE I submarine was scuttled at Kotor, State of Slovenes, Croats and Serbs (44°52′N 13°50′E).
SM UC-34	Imperial German Navy	World War I: The Type UC II submarine was scuttled at Pula, Austria-Hungary (44°52′N 13°50′E).

== 31 October ==
List of shipwrecks: 31 October 1918
Ship	State	Description
A. J. Fuller	United States	The full-rigged sailing ship was rammed and sunk at anchor in Elliott Bay in 41 fathoms (246 ft; 75 m) of water by Mexico Maru (Japan). Both crewmen on board survived.
Fredelia IV	United States	While towing the barge Neptune (United States) during a gale, the 21-gross register ton seiner was wrecked in Seymour Canal on the coast of Admiralty Island in the Alexander Archipelago in Southeast Alaska 1 nautical mile (1.9 km; 1.2 mi) south of Pleasant Bay (57°38′40″N 133°59′15″W) after the towline broke and she collided with Neptune. Fredelia IV was a total loss, but the two men on board survived and were rescued by the motorboat Baltic (United States).
SM UB-129	Imperial German Navy	World War I: The Type UB III submarine was scuttled at Rijeka, State of Slovenes, Croats and Serbs (45°19′N 14°26′E).

== Unknown date ==
List of shipwrecks: Unknown date 1918
Ship	State	Description
SMS Brugge	Imperial German Navy	SMS Brugge. Inset - Charles Fryatt. World War I: The depôt ship was scuttled at Zeebrugge, West Flanders, Belgium.
HMS G7	Royal Navy	World War I: The G-class submarine was lost in the North Sea on or after 23 October. She was declared lost on 1 November.
Prinz Heinrich	Imperial German Navy	World War I: The incomplete Neuwerk-class Vorpostenboot was scuttled sometime in October.
