= U94 =

U94 may refer to:

- German submarine U-94, various vessels
- Small nucleolar RNA SNORD94
- Udar revolver, a police weapon
