= UC-92 =

UC-92 may refer to:

- SM UC-92, a World War I German coastal minelaying submarine
- Funk B, an airplane with a United States military designation of "UC-92"
