= SM UB-86 =

Coordinates: 50°8′49.75″N 5°3′9.20″W

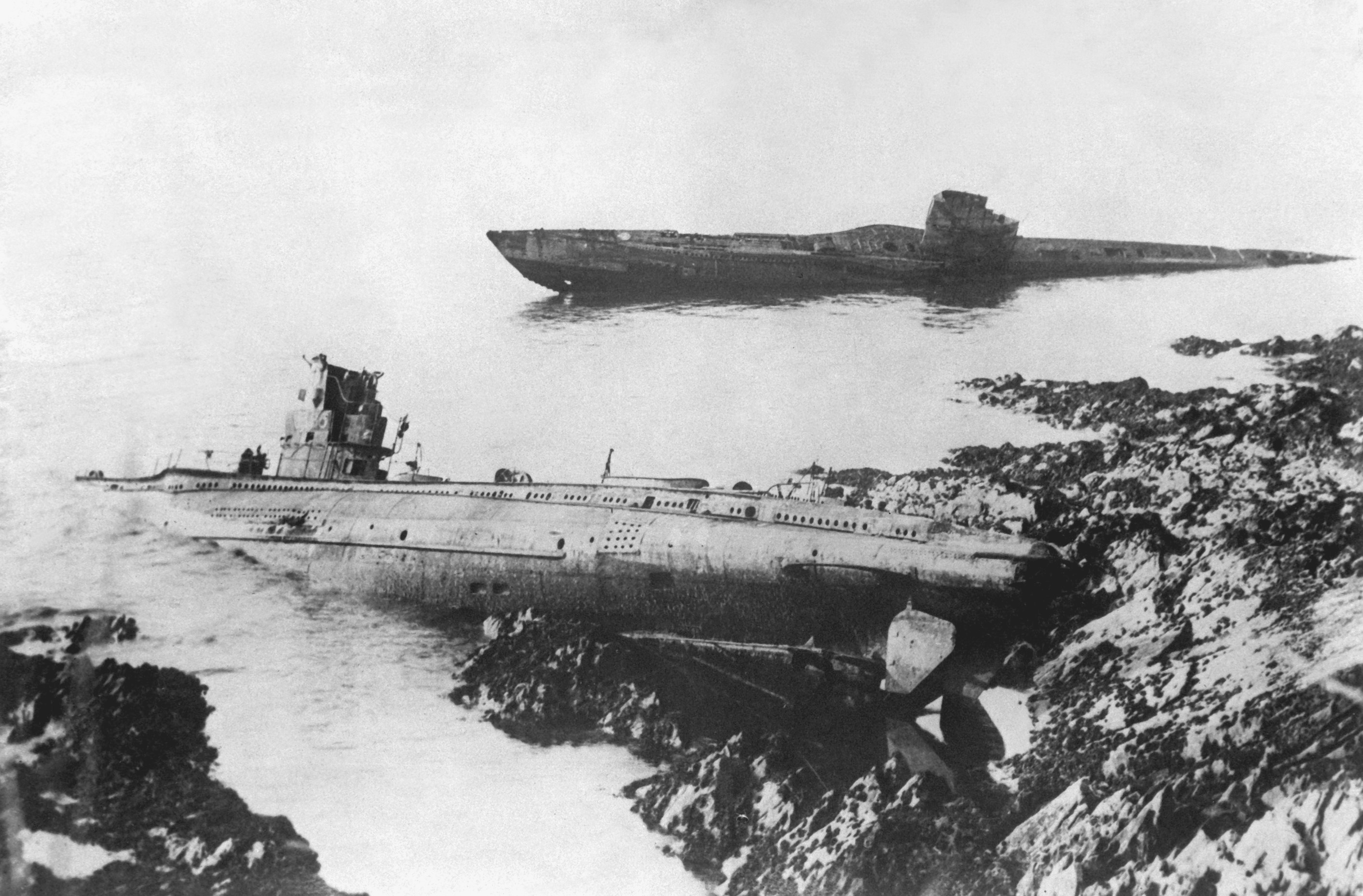
- SM UB-86 dumped after explosive trials at Falmouth, 1921.

History

German Empire
- Name: UB-86
- Ordered: 23 September 1916
- Builder: AG Weser, Bremen
- Cost: 3,341,000 German Papiermark
- Yard number: 286
- Laid down: 25 January 1917
- Launched: 10 October 1917
- Commissioned: 10 November 1917
- Fate: Surrendered 24 November 1918, used for explosive trials and dumped on beach 1920; sold for scrap 1921

General characteristics
- Class & type: Type UB III submarine
- Displacement: 516 t (508 long tons) surfaced; 647 t (637 long tons) submerged
- Length: 55.85 m (183 ft 3 in) (o/a)
- Beam: 5.80 m (19 ft)
- Draught: 3.72 m (12 ft 2 in)
- Propulsion: 2 × propeller shaft; 2 × Benz four-stroke 6-cylinder diesel engines, 1,050 bhp (780 kW); 2 × BBC electric motors, 780 shp (580 kW)
- Speed: 13.4 knots (24.8 km/h; 15.4 mph) surfaced; 7.5 knots (13.9 km/h; 8.6 mph) submerged
- Range: 8,180 nmi (15,150 km; 9,410 mi) at 6 knots (11 km/h; 6.9 mph) surfaced; 50 nmi (93 km; 58 mi) at 4 knots (7.4 km/h; 4.6 mph) submerged
- Test depth: 50 m (160 ft)
- Complement: 3 officers, 31 men
- Armament: 5 × 50 cm (19.7 in) torpedo tubes (4 bow, 1 stern); 10 torpedoes; 1 × 8.8 cm (3.46 in) deck gun

Service record
- Part of: V Flotilla; 10 February – 5 May 1918; III Flotilla; 5 May – 11 November 1918
- Commanders: Kptlt. Hans Trenk; 10 November 1917 – 11 November 1918
- Operations: 5 patrols
- Victories: 4 merchant ships sunk (5,876 GRT); 1 merchant ship damaged (1,735 GRT); 1 warship damaged (14,150 tons)

SM UB-86 was a German Type UB III submarine or U-boat in the German Imperial Navy (German: Kaiserliche Marine) during World War I. She was commissioned into the German Imperial Navy on 31 October 1917 as SM UB-86. (Note: "SM" stands for "Seiner Majestät" (English: His Majesty's) and combined with the U for Unterseeboot would be translated as His Majesty's Submarine.)

UB-86 was surrendered to the Allies at Harwich on 24 November 1918 in accordance with the requirements of the Armistice with Germany. After passing into British hands, UB-86 was towed to Falmouth along with five other U-boats (Note: The other five being UB-97, UC-92, UB-106, UB-112, and UB-128.) for use in a series of explosive test trials by the Royal Navy in Falmouth Bay, in order to find weaknesses in their design. Following her use on 14 January 1921, UB-86 was dumped on Castle Beach and sold to R. Roskelly & Rodgers on 19 April 1921 for scrap (for £110), and partially salvaged over the following decades, although parts remain in situ.

== Construction ==
UB-85 was ordered on 23 September 1916.
She was built by AG Weser of Bremen and following just under a year of construction, launched at Bremen on 10 October 1917. UB-86 was commissioned later that same year under the command of Kptlt. Hans Trenk. Like all Type UB III submarines, UB-86 carried 10 torpedoes and was armed with a 8.8 cm (3.46 in) deck gun. UB-86 would carry a crew of up to 3 officer and 31 men and had a cruising range of 8,180 nautical miles (15,150 km; 9,410 mi). UB-86 had a displacement of 516 t (508 long tons) while surfaced and 647 t (637 long tons) when submerged. Her engines enabled her to travel at 13.4 knots (24.8 km/h; 15.4 mph) when surfaced and 7.5 knots (13.9 km/h; 8.6 mph) when submerged.

== Service history ==
On 17 August 1918 UB-86 torpedoed the cargo steam ship Denebola 2 nautical miles (3.7 km; 2.3 mi) N by W from Gurnard Head near St Ives, Cornwall. Denebola, en route from Swansea bound for Rouen, was struck by two torpedoes which hit near number two and three holds causing her to sink rapidly. The crew took to a boat and a raft and were later picked up by a patrol vessel. The second engineer and one able seaman were lost.

== Summary of raiding history ==
Date	Name	Nationality	Tonnage (Note: Merchant ship tonnages are in gross register tons. Military vessels are listed by tons displacement.)	Fate
21 February 1918	Mercia	Sweden	1,127	Sunk
11 April 1918	HMS King Alfred	Royal Navy	14,150	Damaged
18 April 1918	Gregynog	United Kingdom	1,701	Sunk
17 August 1918	Denebola	United Kingdom	1,481	Sunk
17 August 1918	Helene	Denmark	1,567	Sunk
19 August 1918	Charity	United Kingdom	1,735	Damaged

== Bibliography ==
- Bendert, Harald (2000). Die UB-Boote der Kaiserlichen Marine, 1914-1918. Einsätze, Erfolge, Schicksal (in German). Hamburg: Verlag E.S. Mittler & Sohn GmbH. ISBN 3-8132-0713-7.
- Gröner, Erich; Jung, Dieter; Maass, Martin (1991). U-boats and Mine Warfare Vessels. German Warships 1815–1945. Vol. 2. Translated by Thomas, Keith; Magowan, Rachel. London: Conway Maritime Press. ISBN 0-85177-593-4.
- Rössler, Eberhard (1979). Die deutschen U-Boote und ihre Werften: eine Bilddokumentation über den deutschen U-Bootbau; in zwei Bänden (in German). Vol. I. Munich: Bernard & Graefe. ISBN 3-7637-5213-7.
