= SS Mesaba (1898) =

British cargo liner sunk in 1918

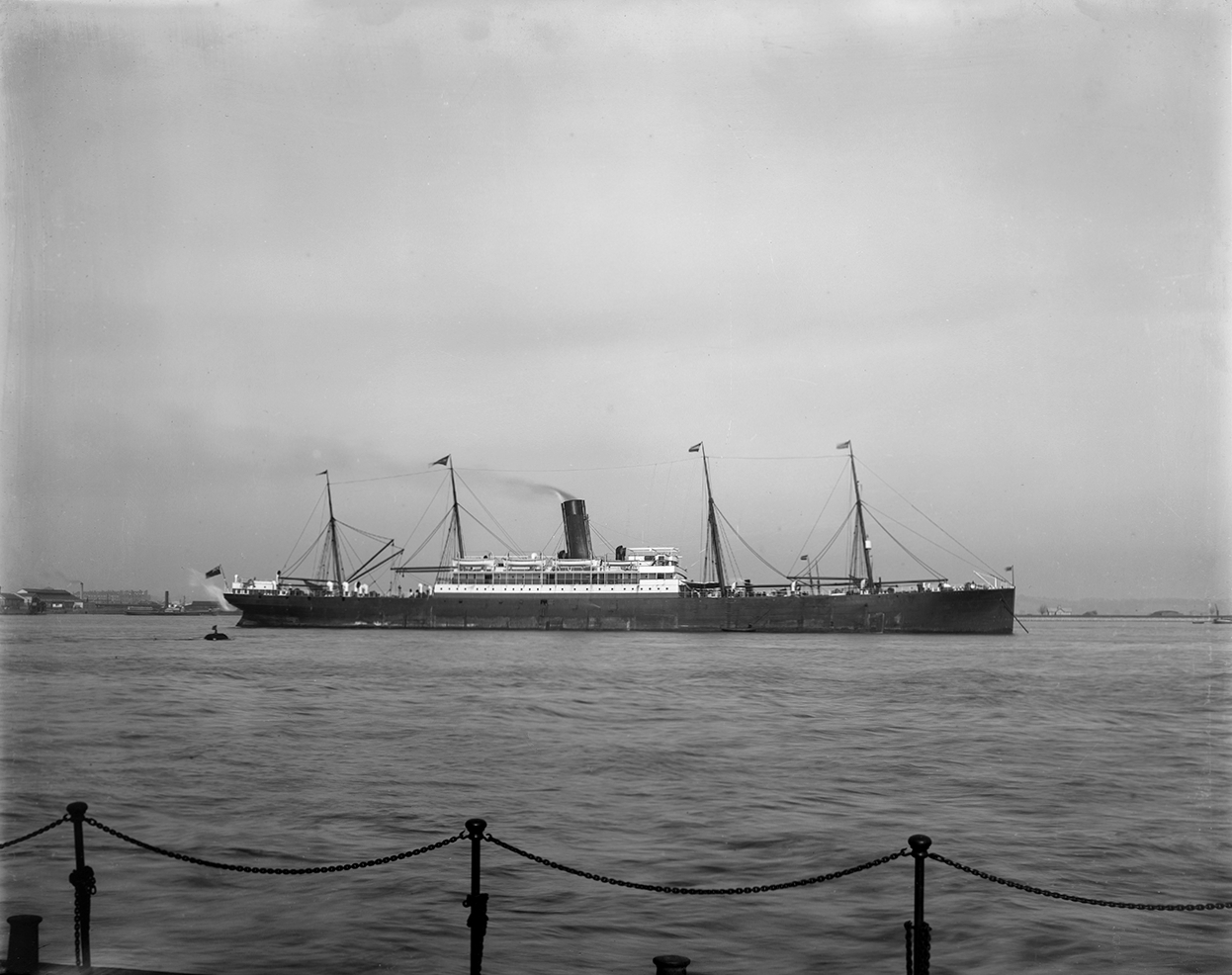
- Mesaba at anchor in Gravesend Reach

History

United Kingdom
- Name: 1898: Winifreda; 1898: Mesaba
- Namesake: 1898: Mesabi Range
- Owner: 1898: Leyland Line; 1898: Atlantic Transport Line
- Port of registry: Liverpool
- Route: London – New York
- Builder: Harland & Wolff, Belfast
- Yard number: 319
- Laid down: 1897
- Launched: 11 September 1897
- Completed: 17 February 1898
- Maiden voyage: 3 March 1898
- Identification: UK official number 109392; code letters PWSL; by 1913: call sign MMV
- Fate: sunk by torpedo, 1 September 1918

General characteristics
- Type: livestock and passenger ship
- Tonnage: 6,833 GRT, 4,423 NRT
- Length: 482.1 ft (146.9 m)
- Beam: 52.2 ft (15.9 m)
- Depth: 31.6 ft (9.6 m)
- Decks: 3
- Installed power: 1 × triple-expansion engine; 772 NHP; 4,300 ihp
- Propulsion: 1 × screw
- Sail plan: 4-masted schooner
- Speed: 14 knots (26 km/h)
- Capacity: 120 × 1st class passengers; plus 800 × cattle; plus 24,569 cubic feet (696 m^{3}) refrigerated cargo
- Sensors & processing systems: by 1910: submarine signalling
- Notes: one of five sister ships

SS Mesaba was a UK transatlantic cargo liner. She was launched in Ireland in 1897 as Winifreda, and made her maiden voyage to New York in 1898. Later that year she changed owners, and was renamed Mesaba.

The ship was designed to carry 120 first class passengers and 800 cattle, and to cross the North Atlantic in ten days. She was built for Leyland Line, for use in the Wilson and Furness-Leyland Line (W&FL) joint service. However, within months of her completion, Atlantic Transport Line (ATL) bought her. She spent almost her entire career in ATL ownership.

In 1909, ATL took delivery of the new liner Minnewaska, and relegated Mesaba to be held in reserve. In 1912, Mesaba sent a wireless telegraph signal to RMS Titanic, warning her of sea ice. On three occasions between 1912 and 1914, ATL loaned Mesaba to Red Star Line.

In 1918, a German U-boat sank Mesaba by torpedo in the Irish Sea, killing 20 members of her crew.

== A class of five cargo liners ==
The ship was the third of a class of five single-screw steamships built for members of the Wilson and Furness-Leyland Line (W&FL) in 1897 and 1898. Previous W&FL ships had all been purely cargo ships to carry livestock. The five new ships were each designed to carry more than 100 passengers, all in first class berths.

The first ship was Alexandra, launched by Alexander Stephen and Sons in Glasgow on 3 August 1897. Next was Victoria, launched by Furness, Withy & Co in West Hartlepool on 31 August. The third was built by Harland & Wolff in Belfast as yard number 319, on slipway number 7. She was launched on 11 September 1897 as Winifreda, and completed on 17 February 1898. A Stephen and Sons also built Boadicea, which was launched on 25 November 1897. The final ship of the class to be built was Cleopatra, which was launched by Earle's Shipbuilding in Hull on 6 April 1898.

== Building and registration ==
Winifreda's registered length was 482.1 ft (146.9 m), her beam was 52.2 ft (15.9 m); and her depth was 31.6 ft (9.6 m). She had first class berths for 120 passengers, and her holds could accommodate 800 head of cattle. Her tonnages were 6,833 GRT and 4,423 NRT. She had a single screw, driven by a three-cylinder triple-expansion engine that was rated at 772 NHP or 4,300 ihp, and gave her a speed of 14 knots (26 km/h). She had four masts, and was rigged as a schooner.

The ship was built with 24,569 cubic feet (696 m^{3}) of her holds refrigerated. She had two De La Vergne single refrigerating plants, and one Linde duplex refrigerating plant. Both used ammonia as a coolant. As early as 1899, she was recorded as loading cargo including "3,284 quarters of beef".

Winifreda's owner was Leyland Line, who registered her in Liverpool. Her UK official number was 109392, and her code letters were PWSL. She began her maiden voyage on 3 March 1898. Her regular route was between London and New York.

== From Winifreda to Mesaba ==
While Winifreda was entering service, Atlantic Transport Line (ATL) was negotiating to buy her and all of her sisters from W&FL, including the uncompleted Cleopatra. Negotiations gained impetus after 21 April 1898, when the Spanish–American War began. ATL sold seven of its ships to the United States Government, and donated another as a hospital ship. In order to replace them, it increased its offer to W&FL to £968,000 for the five ships. The sale of the five ships, plus the W&FL's office in London and berth in New York, was finalised on 21 July. After the sale, Winifreda made one more transatlantic trip to New York and back, before her new owners renamed her.

ATL renamed all of the ships it bought from W&FL. Alexandra became Menominee; Victoria became Manitou; Winifreda became Mesaba; Boadicea became Marquette; and Cleopatra became Mohegan. The Menominee Range, Mesabi Range, and Marquette Iron Range are all iron ore deposits around Lake Superior. All five ships remained registered in the UK. Mohegan was wrecked and lost in October 1898. The remaining four ships continued to run between London and New York, where they served a pier at the foot of West Houston Street.

== Catania ==
At 11:00 hrs on 29 December 1899, on an eastbound voyage from New York to London, Mesaba sighted the US-registered steamship Catania in distress in a gale at position 48°N 38°W.

A giant wave, estimated to be 50 feet (15 m) high, had hit Catania two days previously. It had carried away from everything from her decks, including her funnel and boats, and damaged part of her superstructure. It poured down ventilators and broke through hatches; reached her stoke hold; and put out the fires in her furnaces. Catania signalled Mesaba to take her in tow. A boat from Mesaba, commanded by her Chief Officer and crewed by five men, tried to take a tow line from Mesaba to Catania, but was defeated by the heavy sea. The boat crew then tried to take a line from Catania to Mesaba, but was defeated by the weight of the line. Night then fell, preventing further attempts to secure a line between the two ships.

Mesaba continued to stand by overnight, in order to try again at first light. However, the next day, Catania was no longer in sight. Mesaba searched until 09:00 hrs without finding Catania, and then resumed her eastbound voyage to London. However, Catania's crew pumped the water out of her holds; jury-rigged a temporary funnel from wood, sheet steel and canvas; and got her furnaces re-lit. She resumed her voyage under her own power, and on 6 January 1899 reached São Miguel Island in the Azores. There she spent more than a month receiving repairs, including a better improvised funnel, made mostly from ships' hull plates. On 14 February she reached New York under her own power.

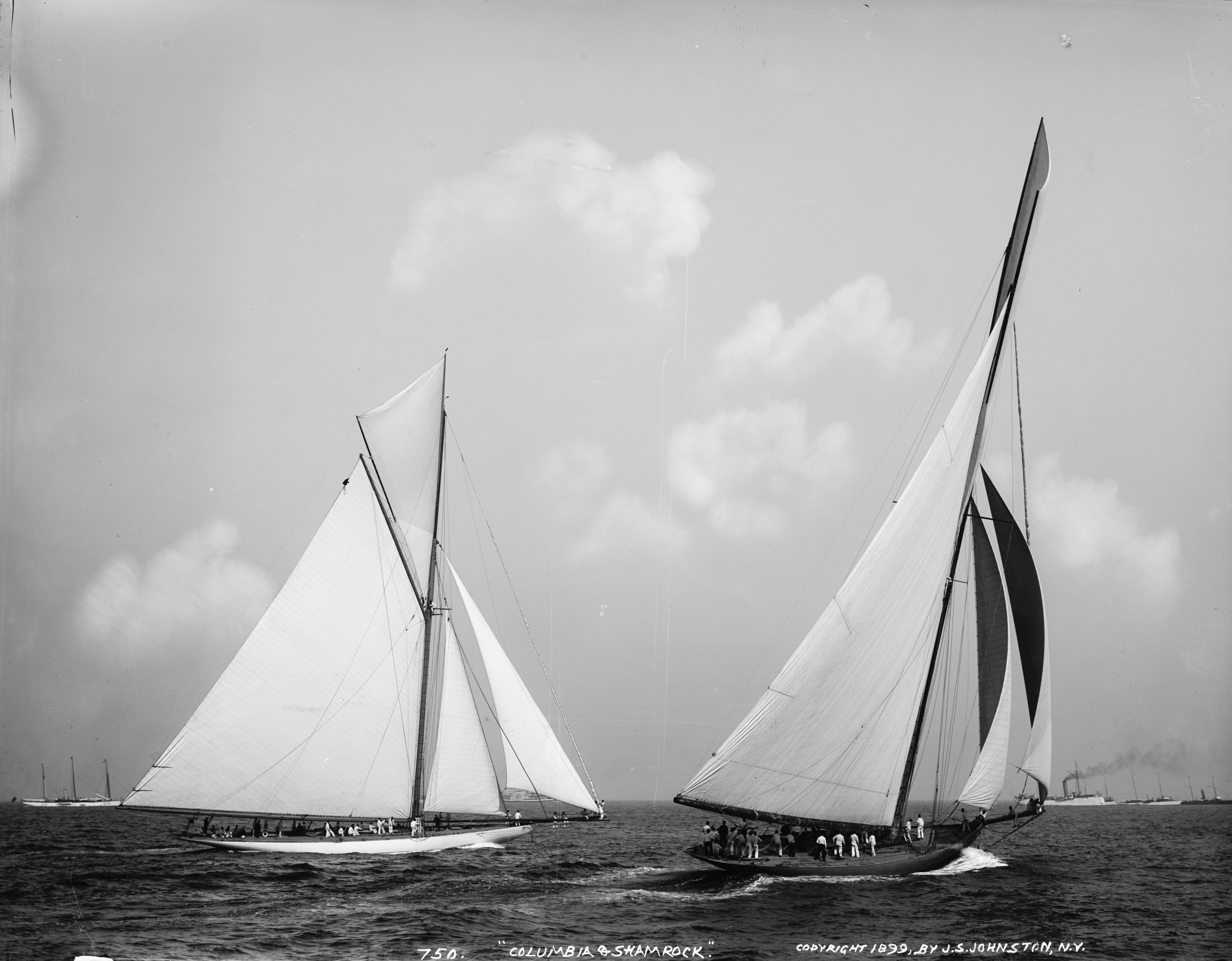
Columbia and Shamrock, rivals in the 1899 America's Cup.

== Shamrock ==
In August 1899, Mesaba brought to New York some of the sails and wooden spars for the new racing yacht Shamrock, which was to compete against Columbia in the 1899 America's Cup. The sails and spars were transferred to Erie Basin.

== Martello and Zeta ==
On 22 September 1900, Mesaba was leaving New York for London when she was involved in a collision with Wilson Line's 3,721 GRT steamship Martello. Mesaba sustained only slight damage, but Martello had to return to port to be dry docked for extensive repairs.

Later in the same voyage, Mesaba was involved in a second collision, this time with the 2,343 GRT steamship Zeta. Zeta's port quarter was damaged. Both ships reached London safely on 3 October.

== Amanda ==
On 1 February 1905, Mesaba sighted the British three-masted wooden schooner Amanda off the Grand Banks of Newfoundland, heavily encrusted with ice, and flying her Red Ensign inverted as a distress signal. Amanda had left St John's, Newfoundland on 24 January with cargo for Salvador, Bahia. A northwesterly gale had swept Amanda off course, and she had sprung a leak. Her crew had worked for five days to pump the water out of her holds by hand, but the water level had risen. In addition, ice formed on her, so thick that it weighed her down along with the water entering her holds. The crew jettisoned her cargo, two anchors, and her anchor chains, but she had continued to sink.

When Mesaba approached Amanda, there was a heavy sea, but the steamship launched two of her port boats, directed by her Chief Officer, and rescued Amanda's captain and crew. The schooner would have formed a hazard to navigation, so Amanda's Master, Captain William Fitzgerald, set his ship on fire before being last to leave her and transfer to Mesaba. The steamship landed the schooner crew at New York on 6 February.

== Modernisation ==
In April 1909, ATL took delivery of the new 14,000 GRT passenger liner Minnewaska. Thereafter, Mesaba was held in reserve. In April 1910, Minnehaha was damaged by running aground in the Isles of Scilly. Mesaba replaced her until her repairs were completed.

By 1910, Mesaba was equipped with submarine signalling and wireless telegraph. The Marconi Company supplied and operated her wireless equipment. By 1913, her call sign was MMV.

== Titanic ==
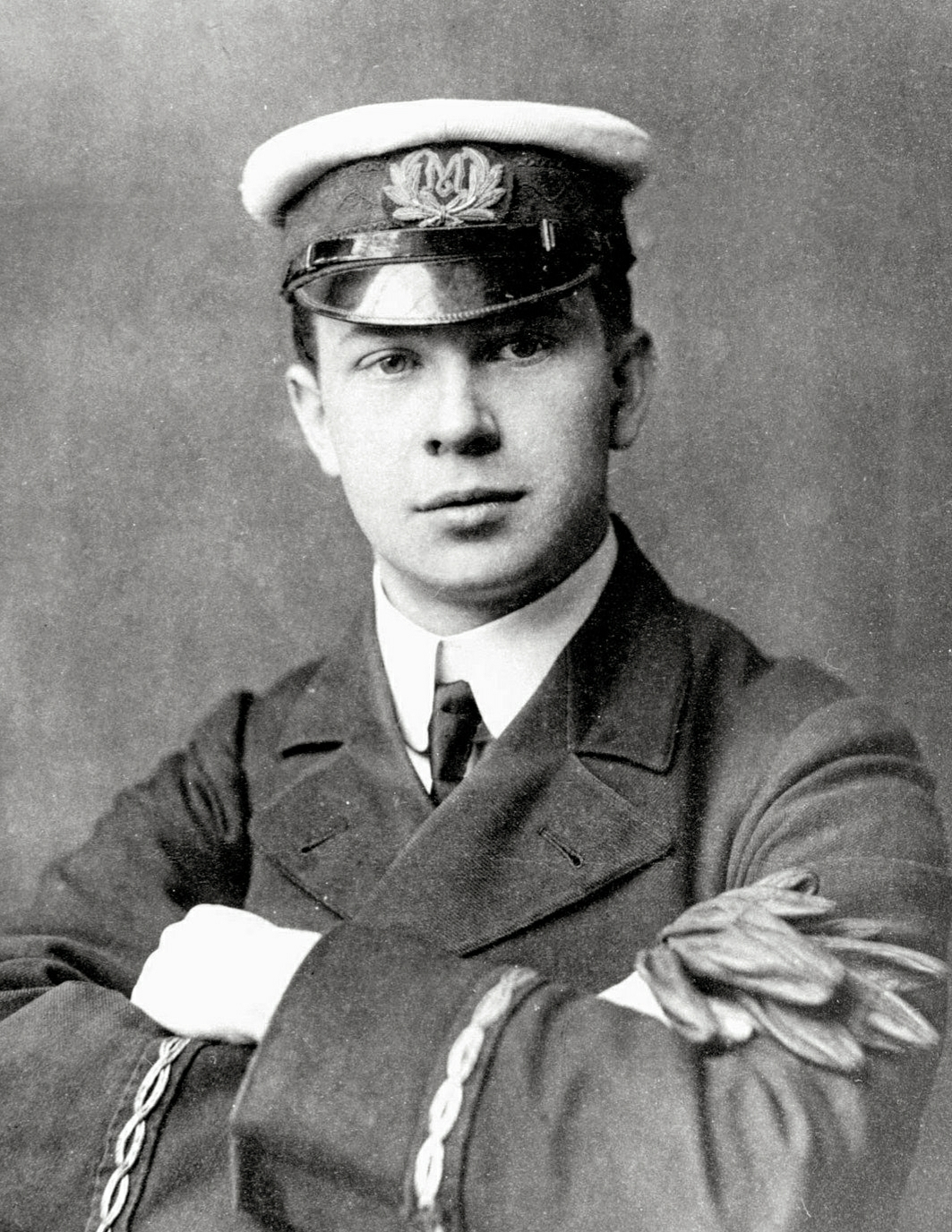
Titanic's senior wireless officer, Jack Phillips, in Marconi Company uniform

On 14 April 1912, Mesaba was making a westbound crossing of the North Atlantic. That evening, her Marconi wireless officer, Stanley Adams, transmitted a sea ice and weather report to RMS Titanic:

To Titanic
In Lat. 42 N. to 41.25 Long 49 W to Long – 50.30 W saw much heavy pack ice and great number large icebergs also field ice.
Weather good, clear

Titanic's senior Marconi wireless officer, Jack Phillips, received the signal about 21:40 hrs that evening; it is unclear, however, whether or not the message reached Titanic's bridge. It was one of a number of ice warnings transmitted to Titanic that evening. Two hours later, Titanic collided with an iceberg, gashing her side below the waterline, and causing herself to sink.

The transmission range of shipborne wireless telegraphy at that time was relatively short. Mesaba's was only 300 kilometres (160 nmi), which was typical for many ships of her era. Wireless-equipped ships compensated for this by relaying signals from ship to ship. Mesaba's wireless signal to Titanic was one of numerous ice and weather reports that ships in the area had been passing to each other that day. At one time during the day on 14 April, Mesaba was about 50 nautical miles (93 km) ahead of the Allan Liner Parisian, which in turn was a similar distance ahead of the Leyland Liner Californian. Titanic was about 125 nautical miles (232 km) astern of Parisian. At about 12:00 noon, Mesaba transmitted an ice warning to Parisian, which relayed it to the Cunard Liner RMS Carpathia. At another time on the same day, Mesaba was astern of Parisian and ahead of Titanic. Early that evening, Parisian sighted "huge icebergs", and transmitted a warning, which Mesaba relayed to Titanic.

== Final peacetime years ==
Between 1912 and 1914, Mesaba made three round trips for Red Star Line between Antwerp and Philadelphia via Boston. One of these voyages seems to have been in June 1912. From November 1912 until May 1913, Mesaba worked almost continually between London and New York. She worked between London and New York again in May 1914.

== First World War ==
Within days of the First World War starting in August 1914, the Admiralty was reported to have requisitioned Mesaba for "transport service".

On 11 August 1918, Mesaba was involved in a collision in fog with the 1,176 GRT steamship Lizard. An inquiry found the two ships equally to blame. 20 days later, on 31 August 1918, Mesaba left Liverpool for Philadelphia in ballast in convoy OL32/OE21. Her Master was Captain Owen Percy Clarke. The next day, SM UB-118 torpedoed her 21 nautical miles (39 km) east of the Tuskar Rock in the Irish Sea. 20 of her crew were killed, including Captain Clarke and her Chief Officer. The gunboat Kildini, commanded by Lieutenant FJ Silva RNR, rescued 78 survivors.

== Wreck ==
In September 2022, researchers from Bangor University and Bournemouth University, using multibeam sonar aboard the research vessel Prince Madog, identified a wreck at 52°17′N 5°38′W as that of Mesaba. She lies at a depth of 315 feet (96 m), and her bow is broken off. Hitherto, the wreck was believed to be that of City of Glasgow, a passenger ship from the same convoy, which was sunk on the same day, and by the same U-boat.
