= SM UB-106 =

Coordinates: 50°8′44.43″N 5°3′0.57″W

- UB-148 at sea, a U-boat similar to UB-106.

History

German Empire
- Name: UB-106
- Ordered: 6 / 8 February 1917
- Builder: Blohm & Voss, Hamburg
- Cost: 3,714,000 German Papiermark
- Yard number: 312
- Launched: 21 July 1917
- Commissioned: 7 February 1918
- Fate: Sunk 15 March 1918, later raised; surrendered 26 November 1918; used for explosive trials and dumped on beach 1921; sold for scrap 1921

General characteristics
- Class & type: Type UB III submarine
- Displacement: 519 t (511 long tons) surfaced; 649 t (639 long tons) submerged
- Length: 55.30 m (181 ft 5 in) (o/a)
- Beam: 5.80 m (19 ft)
- Draught: 3.70 m (12 ft 2 in)
- Propulsion: 2 × propeller shaft; 2 × MAN-Vulcan four-stroke 6-cylinder diesel engines, 1,085 bhp (809 kW); 2 × Siemens-Schuckert electric motors, 780 shp (580 kW)
- Speed: 13.3 knots (24.6 km/h; 15.3 mph) surfaced; 7.5 knots (13.9 km/h; 8.6 mph) submerged
- Range: 7,420 nmi (13,740 km; 8,540 mi) at 6 knots (11 km/h; 6.9 mph) surfaced; 55 nmi (102 km; 63 mi) at 4 knots (7.4 km/h; 4.6 mph) submerged
- Test depth: 50 m (160 ft)
- Complement: 3 officers, 31 men
- Armament: 5 × 50 cm (19.7 in) torpedo tubes (4 bow, 1 stern); 10 torpedoes; 1 × 8.8 cm (3.46 in) deck gun

Service record
- Commanders: Oblt.z.S. Hugo Thielmann; 7 February – 18 March 1918; Oblt.z.S. Max Schmidt; 19 March – 11 November 1918
- Operations: No patrols
- Victories: None

SM UB-106 was a German Type UB III submarine or U-boat in the German Imperial Navy (German: Kaiserliche Marine) during World War I. She was commissioned into the German Imperial Navy on 7 February 1918 as SM UB-104. (Note: "SM" stands for "Seiner Majestät" (English: His Majesty's) and combined with the U for Unterseeboot would be translated as His Majesty's Submarine.)

UB-106 was lost in an accident on 15 March 1918, but was later raised and recommissioned. She was surrendered to the Allies at Harwich on 26 November 1918. After passing into British hands, UB-97 was towed to Falmouth along with five other U-boats (Note: The other five being UB-86, UC-92, UB-97, UB-112, and UB-128.) for use in a series of explosive test trials by the Royal Navy in Falmouth Bay, in order to find weaknesses in their design. Following her use during 13/17 January 1921, UB-106 was dumped on Castle Beach and sold to R. Roskelly & Rodgers on 19 April 1921 for scrap (for £125), and partially salvaged over the following decades, although parts remain in situ.

== Construction ==
She was built by Blohm & Voss of Hamburg and following just under a year of construction, launched at Hamburg on 21 July 1917. UB-106 was commissioned early the next year under the command of Oblt.z.S. Hugo Thielmann. Like all Type UB III submarines, UB-106 carried 10 torpedoes and was armed with a 8.8 cm (3.46 in) deck gun. UB-106 would carry a crew of up to 3 officer and 31 men and had a cruising range of 7,420 nautical miles (13,740 km; 8,540 mi). UB-106 had a displacement of 519 t (511 long tons) while surfaced and 649 t (639 long tons) when submerged. Her engines enabled her to travel at 13.3 knots (24.6 km/h; 15.3 mph) when surfaced and 7.4 knots (13.7 km/h; 8.5 mph) when submerged.

== Bibliography ==
- Bendert, Harald (2000). Die UB-Boote der Kaiserlichen Marine, 1914-1918. Einsätze, Erfolge, Schicksal (in German). Hamburg: Verlag E.S. Mittler & Sohn GmbH. ISBN 3-8132-0713-7.
- Gröner, Erich; Jung, Dieter; Maass, Martin (1991). U-boats and Mine Warfare Vessels. German Warships 1815–1945. Vol. 2. Translated by Thomas, Keith; Magowan, Rachel. London: Conway Maritime Press. ISBN 0-85177-593-4.
- Rössler, Eberhard (1979). Die deutschen U-Boote und ihre Werften: eine Bilddokumentation über den deutschen U-Bootbau; in zwei Bänden (in German). Vol. I. Munich: Bernard & Graefe. ISBN 3-7637-5213-7.
