= SM UC-23 =

German U-boat during the First World War

History

German Empire
- Name: UC-23
- Ordered: 29 August 1915
- Builder: Blohm & Voss, Hamburg
- Yard number: 273
- Launched: 29 February 1916
- Commissioned: 17 July 1916
- Fate: Surrendered, 25 November 1918; broken up, August 1921

General characteristics
- Class & type: Type UC II submarine
- Displacement: 417 t (410 long tons), surfaced; 493 t (485 long tons), submerged
- Length: 49.35 m (161 ft 11 in) o/a; 39.30 m (128 ft 11 in) pressure hull
- Beam: 5.22 m (17 ft 2 in) o/a; 3.65 m (12 ft) pressure hull
- Draught: 3.68 m (12 ft 1 in)
- Propulsion: 2 × propeller shafts; 2 × 6-cylinder, 4-stroke diesel engines, 500 PS (370 kW; 490 bhp); 2 × electric motors, 460 PS (340 kW; 450 shp)
- Speed: 11.6 knots (21.5 km/h; 13.3 mph), surfaced; 7.0 knots (13.0 km/h; 8.1 mph), submerged
- Range: 9,430 nmi (17,460 km; 10,850 mi) at 7 knots (13 km/h; 8.1 mph) surfaced; 55 nmi (102 km; 63 mi) at 4 knots (7.4 km/h; 4.6 mph) submerged
- Test depth: 50 m (160 ft)
- Complement: 26
- Armament: 6 × 100 cm (39.4 in) mine tubes; 18 × UC 200 mines; 3 × 50 cm (19.7 in) torpedo tubes (2 bow/external; one stern); 7 × torpedoes; 1 × 8.8 cm (3.5 in) Uk L/30 deck gun
- Notes: 35-second diving time

Service record
- Part of: Constantinople Flotilla; 6 December 1916 – 11 November 1918
- Commanders: Oblt.z.S. Johannes Kirchner; 28 July 1916 - 6 July 1917; Kptlt. Freiherr Volkhard von Bothmer; 5 July – 14 December 1917; Kptlt. Hans Georg Lübbe; 15 December 1917 – 14 November 1918
- Operations: 17 patrols
- Victories: 41 merchant ships sunk (37,752 GRT); 5 auxiliary warships sunk (4,089 GRT); 1 merchant ship damaged (35 GRT); 2 merchant ships taken as prize (1,232 GRT); 1 auxiliary warship taken as prize (327 GRT)

SM UC-23 was a German Type UC II minelaying submarine or U-boat in the German Imperial Navy (German: Kaiserliche Marine) during World War I. The U-boat was ordered on 29 August 1915 and was launched on 29 February 1916. She was commissioned into the German Imperial Navy on 17 July 1916 as SM UC-23. (Note: "SM" stands for "Seiner Majestät" (English: His Majesty's) and combined with the U for Unterseeboot would be translated as His Majesty's Submarine.) In 17 patrols UC-23 was credited with sinking 46 ships, either by torpedo or by mines laid. UC-23 was surrendered at Sevastopol on 25 November 1918 and broken up at Bizerta in August 1921.

== Design ==
Like all pre-UC-25 Type UC II submarines, UC-23 had a displacement of 417 tonnes (410 long tons) when at the surface and 493 tonnes (485 long tons) while submerged. She had a length overall of 49.35 m (161 ft 11 in), a beam of 5.22 m (17 ft 2 in), and a draught of 3.65 m (12 ft). The submarine was powered by two six-cylinder four-stroke diesel engines each producing 250 metric horsepower (180 kW; 250 shp) (a total of 500 metric horsepower (370 kW; 490 shp)), two electric motors producing 460 metric horsepower (340 kW; 450 shp), and two propeller shafts. She had a dive time of 35 seconds and was capable of operating at a depth of 50 metres (160 ft).

The submarine had a maximum surface speed of 11.6 knots (21.5 km/h; 13.3 mph) and a submerged speed of 7 knots (13 km/h; 8.1 mph). When submerged, she could operate for 55 nautical miles (102 km; 63 mi) at 4 knots (7.4 km/h; 4.6 mph); when surfaced, she could travel 9,430 nautical miles (17,460 km; 10,850 mi) at 7 knots (13 km/h; 8.1 mph). UC-23 was fitted with six 100 centimetres (39 in) mine tubes, eighteen UC 200 mines, three 50 centimetres (20 in) torpedo tubes (one on the stern and two on the bow), seven torpedoes, and one 8.8 cm (3.5 in) Uk L/30 deck gun. Her complement was twenty-six crew members.

== Summary of raiding history ==
Date	Name	Nationality	Tonnage (Note: Merchant ship tonnages are in gross register tons. Military vessels are listed by tons displacement.)	Fate
29 November 1916	Minnewaska	United Kingdom	14,317	Sunk
31 December 1916	Venus	French Navy	281	Sunk
21 February 1917	HMS Princess Alberta	Royal Navy	1,586	Sunk
10 June 1917	Kleopatra	Greece	160	Sunk
13 June 1917	Aghios Nicolaos	Greece	120	Sunk
14 June 1917	New Zealand Transport	United Kingdom	4,481	Sunk
18 June 1917	Pannomitis	Greece	11	Sunk
18 June 1917	Xiphias	Greece	483	Sunk
19 June 1917	Jakobus	Greece	304	Sunk
19 June 1917	Maria	Greece	35	Sunk
19 June 1917	Raxiarchos	Greece	30	Sunk
2 August 1917	HMS Ermine	Royal Navy	1,777	Sunk
6 September 1917	HMT Helgian	Royal Navy	220	Sunk
7 September 1917	HMT By George	Royal Navy	225	Sunk
21 September 1917	Santo Nicola	Kingdom of Italy	159	Sunk
21 September 1917	Spiridon	Greece	128	Sunk
23 September 1917	Nicolaos	Greece	104	Sunk
19 January 1918	Trocas	United Kingdom	4,129	Sunk
22 January 1918	Evangelistria	Greece	21	Sunk
23 January 1918	Birkhall	United Kingdom	4,541	Sunk
24 January 1918	Aghia Arene	Greece	16	Sunk
24 January 1918	Aghios Johannes	Greece	14	Sunk
20 February 1918	Hagios Nicolaos	Greece	18	Sunk
20 February 1918	Maria Archis	Greece	13	Sunk
20 February 1918	Taxi Arches	Greece	3	Sunk
23 February 1918	Aspasia	Greece	105	Sunk
28 February 1918	Hagios Triast	Greece	22	Sunk
11 April 1918	Trud	Imperial Russian Navy	610	Captured as prize
14 April 1918	Unidentified lighter	Russian Empire	100	Sunk
14 April 1918	Kazak	Imperial Russian Navy	622	Captured as prize
14 April 1918	Olga	Imperial Russian Navy	327	Captured as prize
15 April 1918	Rostov	Imperial Russian Navy	1,280	Sunk
3 October 1918	Blasios	Greece	181	Sunk
3 October 1918	Evangelistria	Greece	35	Damaged
5 October 1918	Hagios Marcos	Greece	45	Sunk
5 October 1918	Maria	Spain	2,159	Sunk
5 October 1918	Marigo	Greece	48	Sunk
5 October 1918	Reventazon	United Kingdom	4,050	Sunk
13 October 1918	Aghion Spiridon	Greece	21	Sunk
13 October 1918	Aghios Georgios	Greece	130	Sunk
13 October 1918	Biolleta	Greece	99	Sunk
13 October 1918	Evangelistria	Greece	41	Sunk
13 October 1918	Evangelistrios	Greece	121	Sunk
13 October 1918	Glaros	Greece	43	Sunk
13 October 1918	Iphigenia	Greece	75	Sunk
13 October 1918	Panaghia	Greece	26	Sunk
13 October 1918	Urania	Greece	23	Sunk
15 October 1918	Evangelistria	Greece	24	Sunk
15 October 1918	Georgios	Greece	29	Sunk
15 October 1918	Maria	Greece	43	Sunk
