= SS City of Glasgow (1906) =

UK cargo liner, sunk in 1918

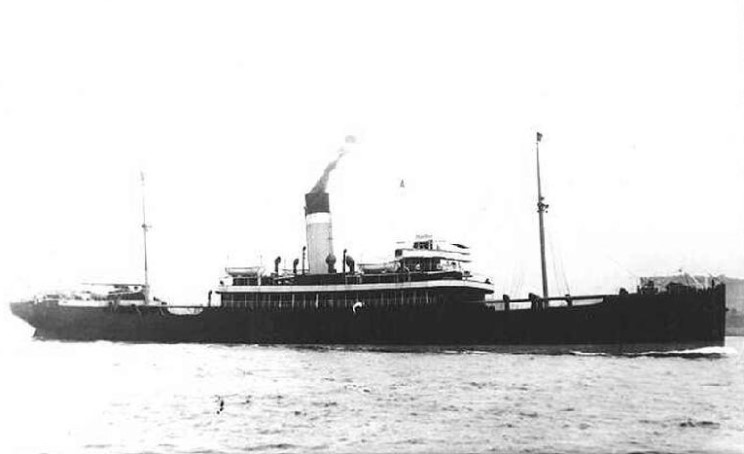
- City of Glasgow

History

United Kingdom
- Name: City of Glasgow
- Namesake: Glasgow
- Owner: Ellerman Lines
- Operator: George Smith & Sons
- Port of registry: Glasgow
- Builder: Workman, Clark & Co, Belfast
- Yard number: 226
- Launched: 15 January 1906
- Completed: March 1906
- Identification: UK official number 121304; code letters HFQB; by 1914: call sign GEU
- Fate: sunk by torpedo, 1 Sep 1918

General characteristics
- Type: cargo liner
- Tonnage: 6,457 GRT, 4,112 NRT
- Length: 443.0 ft (135.0 m) registered
- Beam: 53.6 ft (16.3 m)
- Depth: 30.3 ft (9.2 m)
- Decks: 2
- Installed power: 1 × quadruple-expansion engine; 481 NHP
- Propulsion: 1 × screw
- Speed: 11 knots (20 km/h)
- Capacity: Passengers: 102 × 1st class; 45 × 2nd class

SS City of Glasgow was an Ellerman Lines cargo liner that was built in Ireland in 1906, and sunk in the Irish Sea by a German U-boat in 1918. She was the third of six ships of George Smith & Sons and Ellerman Lines to be named after the city of Glasgow. The first was a wooden-hulled sailing ship that was launched in 1848 and abandoned in 1873. The second was an iron-hulled sailing ship that was built in 1867 and abandoned in 1907. The fourth was a steam turbine ship that was built in 1920 and scrapped in 1958. The fifth was a motor ship that was built in 1963, renamed City of Ottawa in 1971, and scrapped in 1985. The sixth was a motor ship that was built in 1968 as City of Hereford, renamed City of Glasgow in 1971, and scrapped in 1980.

== Building ==
Workman, Clark and Company in Belfast built City of Glasgow as yard number 226. She was launched on 15 January 1906, and completed that March. Her registered length was 443.0 ft (135.0 m), her beam was 53.6 ft (16.3 m), and her depth was 30.3 ft (9.2 m). She was primarily a cargo ship, but had berths for 147 passengers: 102 in first class, and 45 in second class. Her tonnages were 6,457 GRT and 4,112 NRT. She had a single screw, driven by a quadruple-expansion engine that was rated at 481 NHP, and gave her a speed of 11 knots (20 km/h).

== Registration and identification ==
Ellerman Lines registered City of Glasgow in Glasgow. Her United Kingdom official number was 121304, and her code letters were HFQB. George Smith & Sons managed her. By 1914 she was equipped with wireless telegraphy, supplied and operated by the Marconi Company. Her call sign was GEU.

== Loss ==
On 31 August 1918, City of Glasgow left Liverpool for Montreal in ballast in convoy OL32/OE21. The next day, SM UB-118 torpedoed her amidships, 21 nautical miles (39 km) east of Tuskar Rock in the Irish Sea. City of Glasgow broke in two and sank, and 12 members of her crew were killed. The destroyer USS Beale rescued survivors, and also took pictures of the sinking ship.

== Wreck ==
The wreck of City of Glasgow was believed to lie at position 52°17′N 5°38′W, at a depth of 96 metres (315 ft) of water. A wreck was long known to be at that position, but in 2022 researchers from Bangor University and Bournemouth University, using multibeam sonar, identified her as the cargo liner Mesaba, which was sailing in the same convoy as City of Glasgow, and was sunk in the same area, by the same U-boat, on the same day.

== Bibliography ==
- Haws, Duncan (1989). Ellerman Lines. Merchant Fleets. Vol. 16. Hereford: Travel Creatours Ltd Publications. ISBN 0-946378-05-3.
- Lloyd's Register of British and Foreign Shipping. Vol. I.–Steamers. London: Lloyd's Register of Shipping. 1906 – via Internet Archive.
- Lloyd's Register of Shipping. Vol. II.–Steamers. London: Lloyd's Register of Shipping. 1914 – via Internet Archive.
- The Marconi Press Agency Ltd (1914). The Year Book of Wireless Telegraphy and Telephony. London: The Marconi Press Agency Ltd.
