= SM UB-97 =

Coordinates: 50°8′51.51″N 5°3′13.11″W

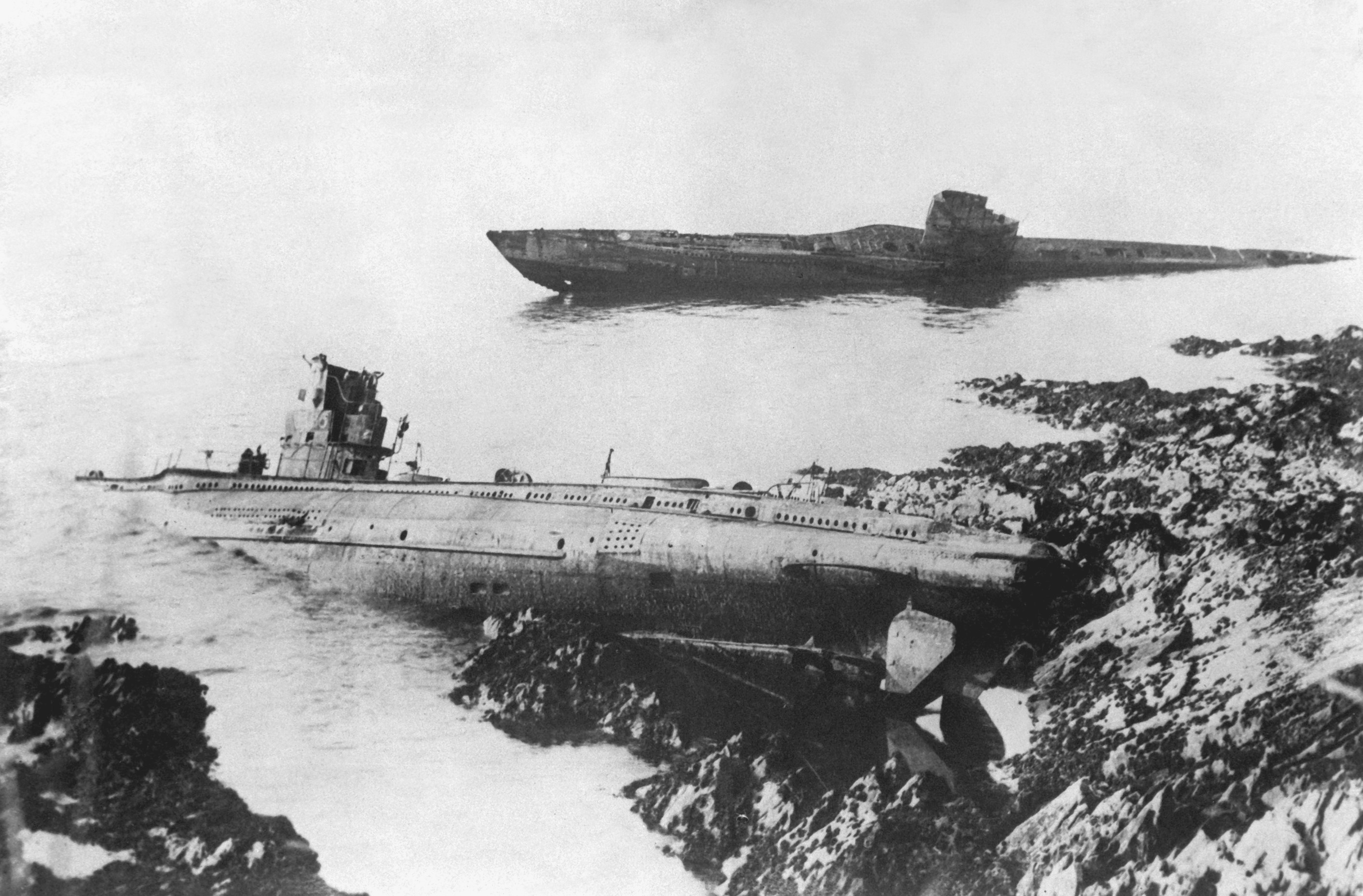
- UB-86 and another Type III UB-boat dumped at Falmouth after explosive trials, 1921.

History

German Empire
- Name: UB-97
- Ordered: 6 / 8 February 1917
- Builder: AG Vulcan, Hamburg
- Cost: 3,654,000 German Papiermark
- Yard number: 113
- Launched: 13 June 1918
- Commissioned: 25 July 1918
- Fate: Surrendered 21 November 1918; used for explosive trials and dumped on beach 1920; sold for scrap 1921

General characteristics
- Class & type: Type UB III submarine
- Displacement: 510 t (500 long tons) surfaced; 640 t (630 long tons) submerged
- Length: 55.52 m (182 ft 2 in) (o/a)
- Beam: 5.76 m (18 ft 11 in)
- Draught: 3.73 m (12 ft 3 in)
- Propulsion: 2 × propeller shaft; 2 × MAN-Vulcan four-stroke 6-cylinder diesel engines, 1,085 bhp (809 kW); 2 × Siemens-Schuckert electric motors, 780 shp (580 kW)
- Speed: 13 knots (24 km/h; 15 mph) surfaced; 7.4 knots (13.7 km/h; 8.5 mph) submerged
- Range: 7,120 nmi (13,190 km; 8,190 mi) at 6 knots (11 km/h; 6.9 mph) surfaced; 55 nmi (102 km; 63 mi) at 4 knots (7.4 km/h; 4.6 mph) submerged
- Test depth: 50 m (160 ft)
- Complement: 3 officers, 31 men
- Armament: 5 × 50 cm (19.7 in) torpedo tubes (4 bow, 1 stern); 10 torpedoes; 1 × 10.5 cm (4.13 in) deck gun

Service record
- Commanders: Lt.z.S.d.R. Oskar Brinkmann; 26 July – 14 August 1918; Oblt.z.S. Georg Stollenz; 15 August – 11 November 1918
- Operations: No patrols
- Victories: None

SM UB-97 was a German Type UB III submarine or U-boat in the German Imperial Navy (German: Kaiserliche Marine) during World War I. She was commissioned into the German Imperial Navy on 25 July 1918 as SM UB-97. (Note: "SM" stands for "Seiner Majestät" (English: His Majesty's) and combined with the U for Unterseeboot would be translated as His Majesty's Submarine.)

UB-97 was surrendered to the Allies at Harwich on 21 November 1918 in accordance with the requirements of the Armistice with Germany. After passing into British hands, UB-97 was towed to Falmouth along with five other U-boats (Note: The other five being UB-86, UC-92, UB-106, UB-112, and UB-128.) for use in a series of explosive test trials by the Royal Navy in Falmouth Bay, in order to find weaknesses in their design. Following her use on 7 March 1921, UB-97 was dumped on Castle Beach and sold to R. Roskelly & Rodgers on 19 April 1921 for scrap (for £50), and partially salvaged over the following decades, although parts remain in situ.

== Construction ==
he was built by AG Vulcan of Hamburg and following just under a year of construction, launched at Hamburg on 13 June 1918. UB-97 was commissioned later the same year under the command of Oblt.z.S. Oskar Brinkmann. Like all Type UB III submarines, UB-97 carried 10 torpedoes and was armed with a 10.5 cm (4.13 in) deck gun. UB-97 would carry a crew of up to 3 officer and 31 men and had a cruising range of 7,120 nautical miles (13,190 km; 8,190 mi). UB-97 had a displacement of 510 t (500 long tons) while surfaced and 640 t (630 long tons) when submerged. Her engines enabled her to travel at 13 knots (24 km/h; 15 mph) when surfaced and 7.4 knots (13.7 km/h; 8.5 mph) when submerged.

== Bibliography ==
- Bendert, Harald (2000). Die UB-Boote der Kaiserlichen Marine, 1914-1918. Einsätze, Erfolge, Schicksal (in German). Hamburg: Verlag E.S. Mittler & Sohn GmbH. ISBN 3-8132-0713-7.
- Gröner, Erich; Jung, Dieter; Maass, Martin (1991). U-boats and Mine Warfare Vessels. German Warships 1815–1945. Vol. 2. Translated by Thomas, Keith; Magowan, Rachel. London: Conway Maritime Press. ISBN 0-85177-593-4.
- Rössler, Eberhard (1979). Die deutschen U-Boote und ihre Werften: eine Bilddokumentation über den deutschen U-Bootbau; in zwei Bänden (in German). Vol. I. Munich: Bernard & Graefe. ISBN 3-7637-5213-7.
