= German submarine U-94 =

U-94 may refer to one of the following German submarines:

- SM U-94, a Type Mittel U submarine launched in 1917 and that served in the First World War until surrendered on 20 November 1918; broken up at Bo'ness in 1920–21
  - During the First World War, Germany also had these submarines with similar names:
    - SM UB-94, a Type UB III submarine launched in 1918 and surrendered on 22 November 1918; became French submarine Trinité Schillemans until 24 July 1935; broken up
    - SM UC-94, a Type UC III submarine launched in 1918 and surrendered on 26 November 1918; broken up at Taranto in August 1919. Conducted no war patrols and sank no ships.
- German submarine U-94 (1940), a Type VIIC submarine that served in the Second World War until sunk on 28 August 1942
