= SM UB-128 =

Coordinates: 50°8′47.86″N 5°3′5.54″W

- UB-148 at sea, a U-boat similar to UB-128.

History

German Empire
- Name: UB-128
- Ordered: 6 / 8 February 1917
- Builder: AG Weser, Bremen
- Cost: 3,654,000 German Papiermark
- Yard number: 301
- Laid down: 20 July 1917
- Launched: 10 April 1918
- Commissioned: 11 May 1918
- Fate: Surrendered 3 February 1919; used for explosive trials and dumped on beach 1921; sold for scrap 1921

General characteristics
- Class & type: Type UB III submarine
- Displacement: 512 t (504 long tons) surfaced; 643 t (633 long tons) submerged
- Length: 55.85 m (183 ft 3 in) (o/a)
- Beam: 5.80 m (19 ft)
- Draught: 3.72 m (12 ft 2 in)
- Propulsion: 2 × propeller shaft; 2 × Benz four-stroke 6-cylinder diesel engines, 1,050 bhp (780 kW); 2 × Schiffsunion electric motors, 780 shp (580 kW)
- Speed: 13.9 knots (25.7 km/h; 16.0 mph) surfaced; 7.6 knots (14.1 km/h; 8.7 mph) submerged
- Range: 7,280 nmi (13,480 km; 8,380 mi) at 6 knots (11 km/h; 6.9 mph) surfaced; 55 nmi (102 km; 63 mi) at 4 knots (7.4 km/h; 4.6 mph) submerged
- Test depth: 50 m (160 ft)
- Complement: 3 officers, 31 men
- Armament: 5 × 50 cm (19.7 in) torpedo tubes (4 bow, 1 stern); 10 torpedoes; 1 × 10.5 cm (4.13 in) deck gun

Service record
- Part of: Mittelmeer I Flotilla; 4 September – 11 November 1918
- Commanders: Kptlt. Wilhelm Canaris; 11 May – 29 November 1918
- Operations: 2 patrols
- Victories: 1 merchant ship sunk (7,418 GRT)

SM UB-128 was a German Type UB III submarine or U-boat in the German Imperial Navy (German: Kaiserliche Marine) during World War I. She was commissioned into the German Imperial Navy on 11 May 1918 as SM UB-128. (Note: "SM" stands for "Seiner Majestät" (English: His Majesty's) and combined with the U for Unterseeboot would be translated as His Majesty's Submarine.)

UB-128 was surrendered to the Allies at Harwich on 3 February 1919 in accordance with the requirements of the Armistice with Germany. After passing into British hands, UB-128 was towed to Falmouth along with five other U-boats (Note: The other five being UB-86, UC-92, UB-106, UB-112, and UB-97.) for use in a series of explosive test trials by the Royal Navy in Falmouth Bay, in order to find weaknesses in their design. Following her use on 1 February 1921, UB-128 was dumped on Castle Beach and sold to R. Roskelly & Rodgers on 19 April 1921 for scrap (for £120), and partially salvaged over the following decades, although parts remain in situ.

== Construction ==
She was built by AG Weser of Bremen and following just under a year of construction, launched at Bremen on 10 April 1918. UB-128 was commissioned later the same year under the command of Kptlt. Wilhelm Canaris. Like all Type UB III submarines, UB-128 carried 10 torpedoes and was armed with a 10.5 cm (4.13 in) deck gun. UB-128 would carry a crew of up to 3 officer and 31 men and had a cruising range of 7,280 nautical miles (13,480 km; 8,380 mi). UB-128 had a displacement of 512 t (504 long tons) while surfaced and 643 t (633 long tons) when submerged. Her engines enabled her to travel at 13.9 knots (25.7 km/h; 16.0 mph) when surfaced and 7.6 knots (14.1 km/h; 8.7 mph) when submerged.

== Summary of raiding history ==
Date	Name	Nationality	Tonnage (Note: Tonnages are in gross register tons)	Fate
21 August 1918	Champlain	France	7,418	Sunk

== Bibliography ==
- Bendert, Harald (2000). Die UB-Boote der Kaiserlichen Marine, 1914-1918. Einsätze, Erfolge, Schicksal (in German). Hamburg: Verlag E.S. Mittler & Sohn GmbH. ISBN 3-8132-0713-7.
- Gröner, Erich; Jung, Dieter; Maass, Martin (1991). U-boats and Mine Warfare Vessels. German Warships 1815–1945. Vol. 2. Translated by Thomas, Keith; Magowan, Rachel. London: Conway Maritime Press. ISBN 0-85177-593-4.
- Rössler, Eberhard (1979). Die deutschen U-Boote und ihre Werften: eine Bilddokumentation über den deutschen U-Bootbau; in zwei Bänden (in German). Vol. I. Munich: Bernard & Graefe. ISBN 3-7637-5213-7.
