= Denebola (disambiguation) =

Denebola may refer to:

- Denebola (β Leo, β Leonis, Beta Leonis), the third-brightest star in the constellation Leo
- Denebola brachycephala, an extinct whale

== Ships ==
- SS Denebola (1899), a German-built British cargo steam ship, 1899–1918
- SS Denebola (T-AKR-289), an Algol-class vehicle cargo ship currently maintained by the United States Maritime Administration
- USS Denebola (AD-12), was an Altair-class destroyer tender of the US Navy
- USS Denebola (AF-56), was a Denebola-class stores ship of the US Navy
