= Small nucleolar RNA SNORD94 =

Small Nucleolar RNA SNORD94
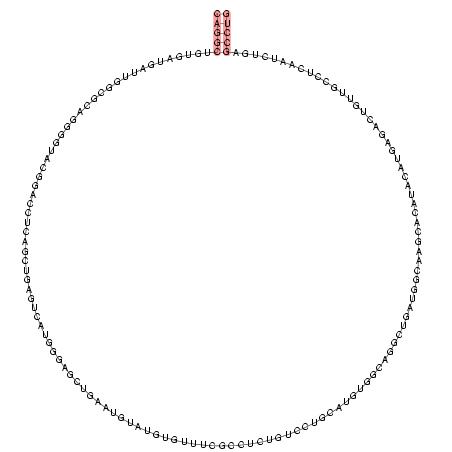
- Predicted secondary structure and sequence conservation of SNORD94

Identifiers
- Symbol: SNORD94
- Rfam: RF00613

Other data
- RNA type: Gene; snRNA; snoRNA; CD-box
- Domain: Eukaryota
- GO: GO:0006396 GO:0005730
- SO: SO:0000593
- PDB structures: PDBe

In molecular biology, Small Nucleolar RNA SNORD94 (also known as U94) is a non-coding RNA (ncRNA) molecule which functions in the biogenesis (modification) of other small nuclear RNAs (snRNAs). This type of modifying RNA is located in the nucleolus of the eukaryotic cell which is a major site of snRNA biogenesis. It is known as a small nucleolar RNA (snoRNA) and also often referred to as a guide RNA.

SNOR94 is a member of the C/D box class of snoRNAs which contain the conserved sequence motifs known as the C box (UGAUGA) and the D box (CUGA). Most of the members of the box C/D family function in directing site-specific 2'-O-methylation of substrate RNAs. SNORD94 is predicted to guide the 2'O-ribose methylation of C62 of the snRNA U6.
