= HMS L12 =

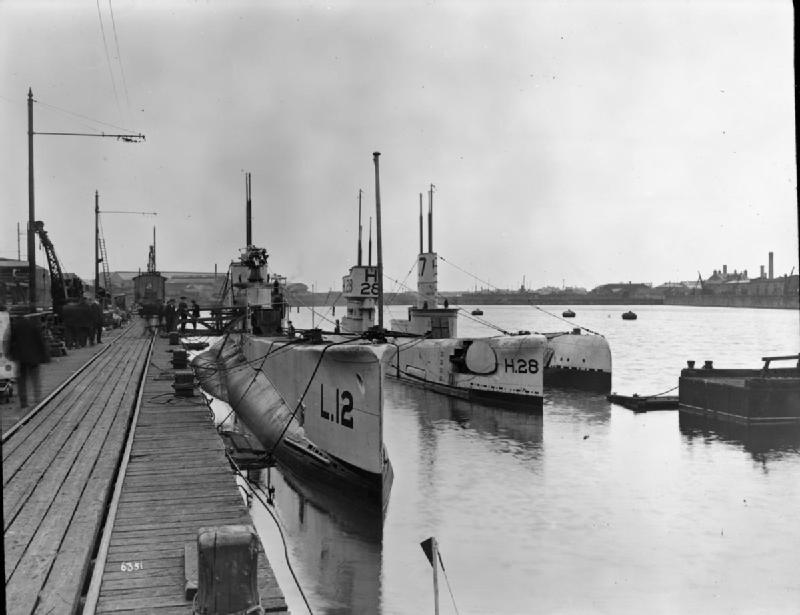
- HMS L12 and H28

History

United Kingdom
- Name: HMS L12
- Builder: Vickers Limited, Barrow-in-Furness
- Laid down: 22 January 1917
- Launched: 16 March 1918
- Commissioned: 30 June 1918
- Fate: Sold for scrapping, 16 February 1932

General characteristics
- Class & type: L-class submarine
- Displacement: 914 long tons (929 t) surfaced; 1,089 long tons (1,106 t) submerged
- Length: 238 ft 7 in (72.7 m)
- Beam: 23 ft 6 in (7.2 m)
- Draught: 13 ft 3 in (4.0 m)
- Installed power: 2,400 bhp (1,800 kW) (diesel); 1,600 hp (1,200 kW) (electric)
- Propulsion: 2 × diesel engines; 2 × electric motors
- Speed: 17 knots (31 km/h; 20 mph) surfaced; 10.5 knots (19.4 km/h; 12.1 mph) submerged
- Range: 3,800 nmi (7,000 km; 4,400 mi) at 10 knots (19 km/h; 12 mph) on the surface
- Test depth: 150 feet (45.7 m)
- Complement: 38
- Armament: 4 × bow 21 in (533 mm) torpedo tubes; 2 × beam 18 in (457 mm) torpedo tubes; 1 × 4-inch deck gun; 16 mines

HMS L12 was a L-class submarine built for the Royal Navy during World War I. She was one of five boats in the class to be fitted as a minelayer. The boat survived the war and was sold for scrap in 1932. On 16 October 1918, SM UB-90 was hit by a torpedo from L12 at 57°55′N 10°27′E and sunk. All 38 crew members died in the event.

== Design and description ==
L9 and its successors were enlarged to accommodate 21-inch (53.3 cm) torpedoes and more fuel. The submarine had a length of 238 feet 7 inches (72.7 m) overall, a beam of 23 feet 6 inches (7.2 m) and a mean draught of 13 feet 3 inches (4.0 m). They displaced 914 long tons (929 t) on the surface and 1,089 long tons (1,106 t) submerged. The L-class submarines had a crew of 38 officers and ratings.

For surface running, the boats were powered by two 12-cylinder Vickers 1,200-brake-horsepower (895 kW) diesel engines, each driving one propeller shaft. When submerged each propeller was driven by a 600-horsepower (447 kW) electric motor. They could reach 17 knots (31 km/h; 20 mph) on the surface and 10.5 knots (19.4 km/h; 12.1 mph) underwater. On the surface, the L class had a range of 3,800 nautical miles (7,000 km; 4,400 mi) at 10 knots (19 km/h; 12 mph).

The boats were armed with four 21-inch torpedo tubes in the bow and two 18-inch (45 cm) in broadside mounts. They carried four reload torpedoes for the 21-inch tubes for a grand total of ten torpedoes of all sizes. They were also armed with a 4-inch (102 mm) deck gun. L12 was fitted with 16 vertical mine chutes in her saddle tanks and carried one mine per chute.

== Construction and career ==
HMS L12 was built by Vickers, Barrow-in-Furness. She was laid down on 22 January 1917 and was commissioned on 30 June 1918. The boat collided with the submarine HMS H47 off Milford Haven, Wales on 9 July 1929. She was able to surface and returned to Milford Haven; three sailors died. HMS L12 was sold to John Cashmore Ltd on 16 February 1932 for scrapping at Newport.
