= USS Simplicity =

Patrol vessel of the United States Navy

History

United States
- Name: USS Simplicity
- Namesake: Previous name retained
- Builder: Smith and Mabely, Astoria, New York
- Completed: 1906
- Acquired: 12 May 1917
- Commissioned: 7 June 1917
- Stricken: 19 October 1918
- Fate: Crushed in collision 19 October 1918; hulk beached and stripped
- Notes: Operated as private motorboat Simplicity 1906-1917

General characteristics
- Type: Patrol vessel
- Tonnage: 21 tons
- Length: 58 ft 9 in (17.91 m)
- Beam: 10 ft 6 in (3.20 m)
- Draft: 3 ft 6 in (1.07 m)
- Speed: 14 knots
- Complement: 7
- Armament: 1 × 1-pounder gun; 1 × machine gun

USS Simplicity (SP-96) was an armed motorboat that served in the United States Navy as a patrol vessel from 1917 to 1918.

Simplicity was built as a civilian motorboat in 1906 by Smith and Mabely at Astoria, New York. On 12 May 1917, the U.S. Navy acquired her from her owner, A. S. Korter of New York City, for World War I service as a patrol boat. She was commissioned on 7 June 1917 as USS Simplicity (SP-96).

Simplicity was assigned to the Section Net Patrol at New York City, where she carried out harbor patrols during World War I

On 19 October 1918, the barge No. 78 struck and crushed Simplicity while she was alongside a United States Army pier at Fort Wadsworth, New York. Her hulk was beached and stripped by the Navy, and she was stricken from the Navy List as of 19 October 1918.
