= SM UC-92 =

German World War I Type UC III submarine

Coordinates: 50°8′50.02″N 5°3′23.33″W

History

German Empire
- Name: UC-92
- Ordered: 12 January 1916
- Builder: Blohm & Voss, Hamburg
- Yard number: 326
- Launched: 19 January 1918
- Commissioned: 14 August 1918
- Fate: Surrendered 24 November 1918; used for explosive trials and dumped on beach 1920; sold for scrap 1921

General characteristics
- Class & type: Type UC III submarine
- Displacement: 491 t (483 long tons), surfaced; 571 t (562 long tons), submerged
- Length: 56.51 m (185 ft 5 in) (o/a); 42.20 m (138 ft 5 in) (pressure hull)
- Beam: 5.54 m (18 ft 2 in) (o/a)
- Draft: 3.77 m (12 ft 4 in)
- Propulsion: 2 × propeller shafts; 2 × 6-cylinder, 4-stroke diesel engines, 600 PS (440 kW; 590 bhp); 2 × electric motors, 770 PS (570 kW; 760 shp)
- Speed: 11.5 knots (21.3 km/h; 13.2 mph), surfaced; 6.6 knots (12.2 km/h; 7.6 mph), submerged
- Range: 9,850 nautical miles (18,240 km; 11,340 mi) at 7 knots (13 km/h; 8.1 mph), surfaced; 40 nmi (74 km; 46 mi) at 4.5 knots (8.3 km/h; 5.2 mph), submerged
- Test depth: 75 m (246 ft)
- Complement: 32
- Armament: 6 × 100 cm (39.4 in) mine tubes; 14 × UC 200 mines; 3 × 50 cm (19.7 in) torpedo tubes (2 bow external; one stern); 7 × torpedoes; 1 x 10.5 cm (4.1 in) SK L/45 or 8.8 cm (3.5 in) Uk L/30 deck gun
- Notes: 15-second diving time

Service record
- Operations: None
- Victories: None

SM UC-92 was a German Type UC III minelaying submarine or U-boat in the German Imperial Navy (German: Kaiserliche Marine) during World War I.

== Design ==
A Type UC III submarine, UC-92 had a displacement of 491 tonnes (483 long tons) when at the surface and 571 tonnes (562 long tons) while submerged. She had a length overall of 56.51 m (185 ft 5 in), a beam of 5.54 m (18 ft 2 in), and a draught of 3.77 m (12 ft 4 in). The submarine was powered by two six-cylinder four-stroke diesel engines each producing 300 metric horsepower (220 kW; 300 shp) (a total of 600 metric horsepower (440 kW; 590 shp)), two electric motors producing 770 metric horsepower (570 kW; 760 shp), and two propeller shafts. She had a dive time of 15 seconds and was capable of operating at a depth of 75 metres (246 ft).

The submarine was designed for a maximum surface speed of 11.5 knots (21.3 km/h; 13.2 mph) and a submerged speed of 6.6 knots (12.2 km/h; 7.6 mph). When submerged, she could operate for 40 nautical miles (74 km; 46 mi) at 4.5 knots (8.3 km/h; 5.2 mph); when surfaced, she could travel 9,850 nautical miles (18,240 km; 11,340 mi) at 7 knots (13 km/h; 8.1 mph). UC-92 was fitted with six 100 centimetres (39 in) mine tubes, fourteen UC 200 mines, three 50 centimetres (20 in) torpedo tubes (one on the stern and two on the bow), seven torpedoes, and one 10.5 cm (4.1 in) SK L/45 or 8.8 cm (3.5 in) Uk L/30 deck gun. Her complement was twenty-six crew members.

== Construction, career and demise ==
The U-boat was ordered on 12 January 1916 and was launched on 19 January 1918. She was commissioned into the German Imperial Navy on 14 August 1918 as SM UC-92. (Note: "SM" stands for "Seiner Majestät" (English: His Majesty's) and combined with the U for Unterseeboot would be translated as His Majesty's Submarine.) As with the rest of the completed UC III boats, UC-92 conducted no war patrols and sank no ships. She was surrendered on 24 November 1918. After passing into British hands, UC-92 was exhibited at Bristol along with SM U-86.

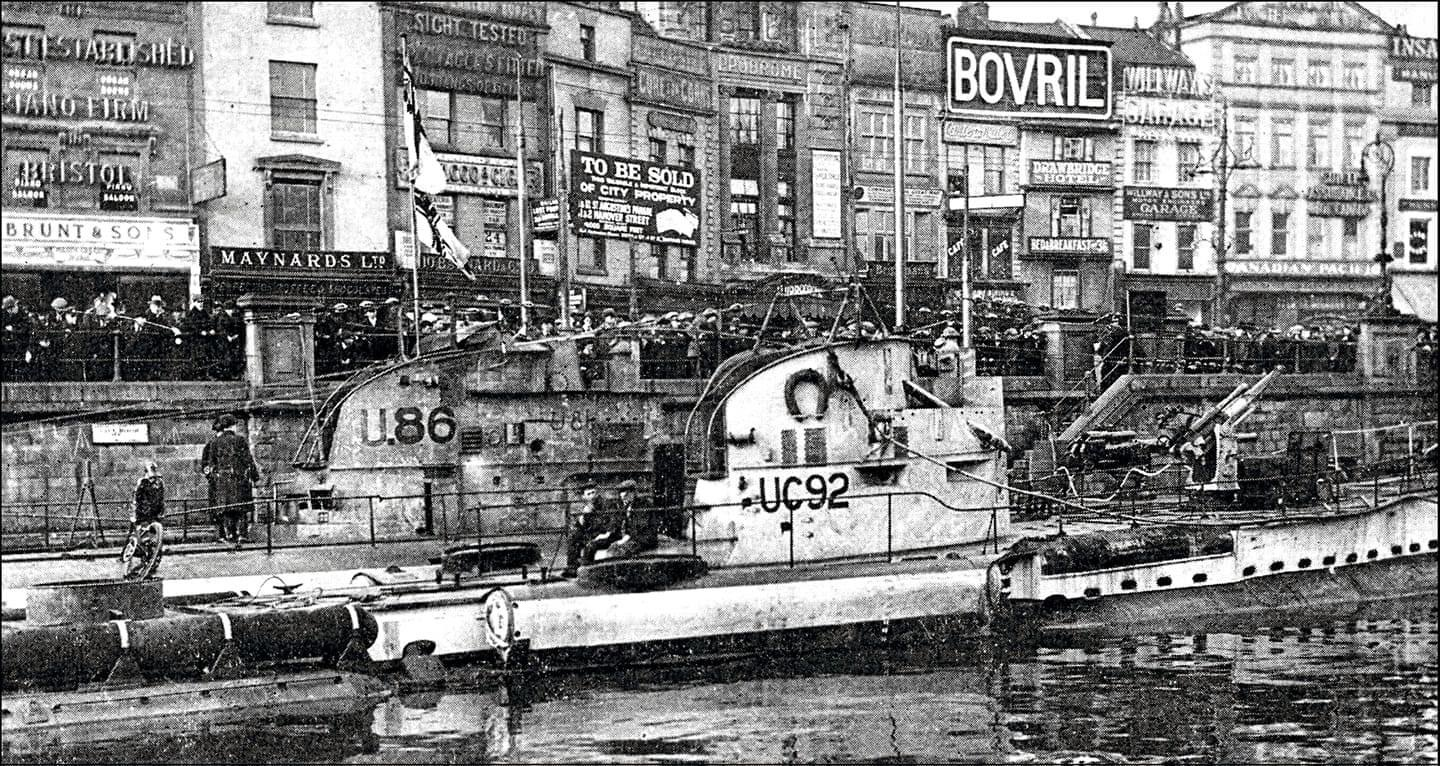
Uboats U-86 and UC-92 on exhibition in Bristol at the end of the war. Bristol Hippodrome can be seen in the background.

Later, UC-92 was towed to Falmouth along with five other U-boats (Note: The other five being UB-86, UB-97, UB-106, UB-112, and UB-128.) for use in a series of explosive test trials by the Royal Navy in Falmouth Bay, in order to find weaknesses in their design. Following her use on 7 March 1921, UC-92 was dumped on Castle Beach and sold to R. Roskelly & Rodgers on 19 April 1921 for scrap, and partially salvaged over the following decades, with some efforts noted as late as the 1960s. In 2013, Wessex Archaeology, assisted by local divers with knowledge of the site, conducted a survey of UC-92, along with the other submarines. The wreck was positively identified, as UC-92 was the only one of the submarines brought to Falmouth to have been a mine-laying vessel, and her six mine tubes were identified among the surviving wreck features. The lower parts of the vessel remain on the seabed just off shore, with parts of the structure breaking the surface during low water springs. Along with the remains of the other submarines brought to the bay, the site is a popular attraction for local divers.
