= USS Cero (SP-1189) =

Patrol vessel of the United States Navy

Coordinates: 41.517688°N 71.331621°W

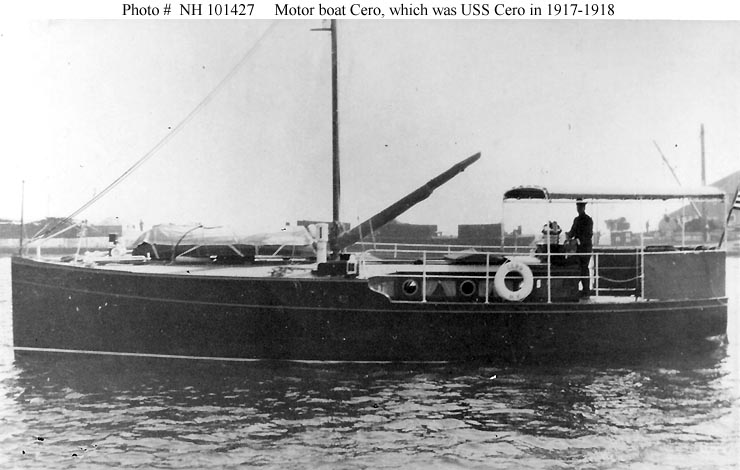
- Cero as a private motorboat sometime between 1915 and 1917.

History

United States
- Name: USS Cero
- Namesake: Previous name retained
- Builder: Luders Marine Construction Company, Stamford, Connecticut
- Completed: 1915
- Acquired: August 1917
- Fate: Burned and sank 21 October 1918
- Notes: Operated as private motorboat Cero 1915–1917

General characteristics
- Type: Patrol vessel
- Length: 40 ft (12 m)

The first USS Cero (SP-1189) was a United States Navy patrol vessel in commission from 1917 to 1918.

Cero was built as a private motorboat of the same name in 1915 by the Luders Marine Construction Company at Stamford, Connecticut. In mid-July 1917, the U.S. Navy ordered her to be turned over to its control for use as a section patrol boat during World War I. Her owner, R. C. McCorkle of New York City, delivered her to the Navy in August 1917, and she was placed in service as USS Cero (SP-1189).

Assigned to the 2nd Naval District in southern New England, Cero served on patrol duties until 21 October 1918, when she was completely destroyed by a fire while in Narragansett Bay off Newport, Rhode Island, and sank 50 feet (15 meters) west of Bishop's Rock and about 500 yards (460 meters) west of Coasters Harbor Island. Her entire crew was rescued uninjured.
