= SM UB-112 =

Coordinates: 50°8′46.86″N 5°3′1.96″W

- UB-148 at sea, a U-boat similar to UB-112.

History

German Empire
- Name: UB-112
- Ordered: 6 / 8 February 1917
- Builder: Blohm & Voss, Hamburg
- Cost: 3,714,000 German Papiermark
- Yard number: 318
- Launched: 15 September 1917
- Commissioned: 16 April 1918
- Fate: Surrendered 24 November 1918; used for explosive trials and dumped on beach 1920; sold for scrap 1921

General characteristics
- Class & type: Type UB III submarine
- Displacement: 519 t (511 long tons) surfaced; 649 t (639 long tons) submerged
- Length: 55.30 m (181 ft 5 in) (o/a)
- Beam: 5.80 m (19 ft)
- Draught: 3.70 m (12 ft 2 in)
- Propulsion: 2 × propeller shaft; 2 × MAN-Vulcan four-stroke 6-cylinder diesel engines, 1,085 bhp (809 kW); 2 × Maffei electric motors, 780 shp (580 kW)
- Speed: 13.3 knots (24.6 km/h; 15.3 mph) surfaced; 7.5 knots (13.9 km/h; 8.6 mph) submerged
- Range: 7,420 nmi (13,740 km; 8,540 mi) at 6 knots (11 km/h; 6.9 mph) surfaced; 55 nmi (102 km; 63 mi) at 4 knots (7.4 km/h; 4.6 mph) submerged
- Test depth: 50 m (160 ft)
- Complement: 3 officers, 31 men
- Armament: 5 × 50 cm (19.7 in) torpedo tubes (4 bow, 1 stern); 10 torpedoes; 1 × 8.8 cm (3.46 in) deck gun

Service record
- Part of: Flandern II Flotilla; 21 July – 18 October 1918; III Flotilla; 18 October – 11 November 1918
- Commanders: Kptlt. Wilhelm Rhein; 16 April – 11 November 1918
- Operations: 3 patrols
- Victories: 11 merchant ships sunk (10,459 GRT); 1 merchant ship damaged (1,960 GRT)

SM UB-112 was a German Type UB III submarine or U-boat in the German Imperial Navy (German: Kaiserliche Marine) during World War I. She was commissioned into the German Imperial Navy on 16 April 1918 as SM UB-112. (Note: "SM" stands for "Seiner Majestät" (English: His Majesty's) and combined with the U for Unterseeboot would be translated as His Majesty's Submarine.)

UB-112 was surrendered to the Allies at Harwich on 24 November 1918 in accordance with the requirements of the Armistice with Germany; she was used for explosives trials off Falmouth on 20 November and 1 December 1920, after which the boat was dumped on Castle Beach. The wreck was sold for scrap to R. Roskelly & Rodgers on 19 April 1921 for £125, but remains survive in situ.

== Construction ==
She was built by Blohm & Voss of Hamburg and following just under a year of construction, launched at Hamburg on 15 September 1917. UB-112 was commissioned in the spring the next year under the command of Kptlt. Wilhelm Rhein. Like all Type UB III submarines, UB-112 carried 10 torpedoes and was armed with a 8.8 cm (3.46 in) deck gun. UB-112 would carry a crew of up to 3 officer and 31 men and had a cruising range of 7,420 nautical miles (13,740 km; 8,540 mi). UB-112 had a displacement of 519 t (511 long tons) while surfaced and 649 t (639 long tons) when submerged. Her engines enabled her to travel at 13.3 knots (24.6 km/h; 15.3 mph) when surfaced and 7.4 knots (13.7 km/h; 8.5 mph) when submerged.

== Summary of raiding history ==
Date	Name	Nationality	Tonnage (Note: Tonnages are in gross register tons)	Fate
21 August 1918	The Stewart’s Court	United Kingdom	813	Sunk
22 August 1918	Prunelle	United Kingdom	579	Sunk
23 August 1918	Heros	Sweden	351	Sunk
30 September 1918	Atlantico	Portugal	319	Sunk
1 October 1918	Aldebaran	Sweden	1,683	Sunk
1 October 1918	Gjertrud	Norway	593	Sunk
2 October 1918	Bamse	United Kingdom	1,001	Sunk
2 October 1918	Poljames	United Kingdom	856	Sunk
3 October 1918	Atlantis	Norway	1,171	Sunk
3 October 1918	Westwood	United Kingdom	1,968	Sunk
3 October 1918	A.E. Mc Kinstry	Canada	1,960	Damaged
4 October 1918	Nanna	Norway	1,125	Sunk

== Bibliography ==
- Bendert, Harald (2000). Die UB-Boote der Kaiserlichen Marine, 1914-1918. Einsätze, Erfolge, Schicksal (in German). Hamburg: Verlag E.S. Mittler & Sohn GmbH. ISBN 3-8132-0713-7.
- Gröner, Erich; Jung, Dieter; Maass, Martin (1991). U-boats and Mine Warfare Vessels. German Warships 1815–1945. Vol. 2. Translated by Thomas, Keith; Magowan, Rachel. London: Conway Maritime Press. ISBN 0-85177-593-4.
- Rössler, Eberhard (1979). Die deutschen U-Boote und ihre Werften: eine Bilddokumentation über den deutschen U-Bootbau; in zwei Bänden (in German). Vol. I. Munich: Bernard & Graefe. ISBN 3-7637-5213-7.
