= USS Victoria (AO-46) =

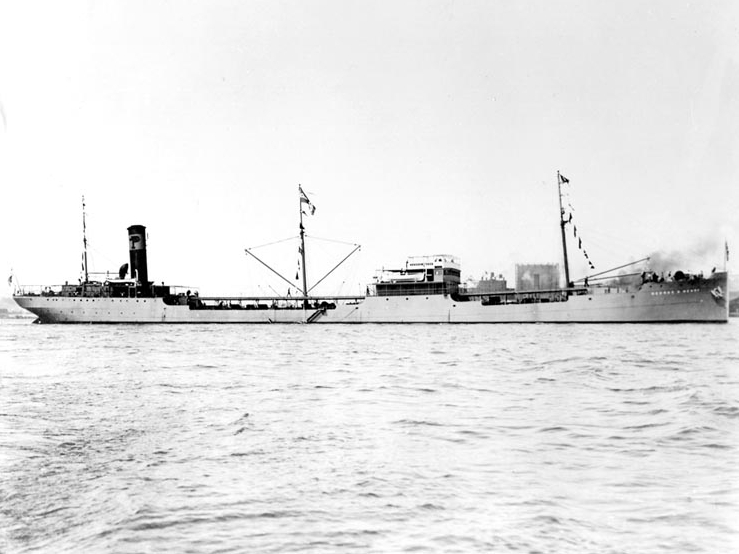

History

United States
- Name: USS George G. Henry (ID-1560)
- Builder: Union Iron Works, San Francisco, California
- Launched: 9 April 1917
- Acquired: by charter, 23 August 1918
- Commissioned: 23 August 1918
- Decommissioned: 21 May 1919
- Stricken: 21 May 1919
- Fate: Returned to owner, 21 May 1919

United States
- Name: USS Victoria (AO-46)
- Namesake: Victoria River
- Acquired: by charter, 15 April 1942
- Commissioned: 15 April 1942
- Decommissioned: 14 December 1945
- Renamed: Victoria (AO-46), 25 April 1942
- Stricken: 8 January 1946
- Honors and awards: 4 battle stars (World War II)
- Fate: Scrapped 1949

General characteristics
- Type: Oiler
- Displacement: 13,179 long tons (13,390 t)
- Length: 435 ft (133 m)
- Beam: 56 ft (17 m)
- Draft: 26 ft 6 in (8.08 m)
- Depth: 33 ft 6 in (10.21 m)
- Propulsion: 2800 horsepower from 3 Scotch boilers to a triple expansion engine
- Speed: 11 knots (20 km/h; 13 mph)
- Capacity: 78166 barrels
- Complement: 59
- Armament: World War I : 1 × 5 in (130 mm) gun; 1 × 3 in (76 mm) gun

USS Victoria (AO-46) was an oiler for the United States Navy in World War II, and the second ship to bear the name. She was built in 1917 as SS George G. Henry in San Francisco for the Pan American Petroleum and Transport Company. During World War I, the ship was requisitioned by the U.S. Navy and employed as USS George G. Henry (ID-1560). Between the two world wars and at the beginning of the second, she served as a civilian tanker, initially under American registry, but later under Panamanian registry.

== Service history ==
=== World War I as USS George G. Henry, 1917–1919 ===
The second USS Victoria was originally built in 1917 as the steel-hulled, single-screw tanker George G. Henry. Constructed at San Francisco, California, by Union Iron Works, the ship was chartered by the United States Navy from her original owners, the Pan American Petroleum & Transport Co., on 23 August 1918; and commissioned at New York City the same day.

Designated Id. No. 1560, George G. Henry departed New York on 29 August 1918, bound for European waters carrying aviation gasoline and Army medical stores. After discharging that cargo at Le Havre, France, the tanker touched at Spithead and Plymouth, England, before setting out across the Atlantic on her way back to the east coast of the United States.

At 08:50 on 29 September, George G. Henry sighted the German submarine U-152 on the surface, 5,000 yards off her port beam, went to general quarters, and opened fire at once with her forward gun. Attempting to keep the submarine directly astern, the tanker steered a northerly course and brought her after gun to bear on the enemy.

George G. Henry's gunners at the after mount managed to hurl 21 rounds at the enemy, landing several shells close aboard and forcing the surfaced submarine to maneuver radically. At 09:05, U-152 managed to score a hit on the tanker. The German shell pierced the American ship's after deck, damaging the steering gear and destroying the after magazine.

While flames enveloped the fantail, George G. Henry steered to bring her forward gun to bear while damage control parties fought the fires aft. Well-placed salvoes managed to keep the enemy away, while six smoke floats dropped over the side produced a dense, impenetrable smoke screen that shielded the tanker for some 20 minutes.

U-152, however, passed the weather side of that bank of smoke and renewed the action, landing shells close aboard. Shrapnel flailed the superstructure of the tanker, wounding 14 men. The after gun, though, still had some fight left. Its crew managed to get off two remaining rounds at 10:15. Ten minutes later, the submarine gave up the chase and broke off the action.

In subsequent reports, Comdr. Weeden credited his ship's survival to Ens. George R. Thompson, USNRF, the head of the engine room force. Working amidst flames and acrid smoke, Thompson and his men remained below, working the vital machinery, allowing George G. Henry to maintain speed throughout the running battle. Three men under Thompson's command – members of the "black gang" – received honors: Chief Water Tender Hal Neargardt, USN, and Fireman First Class W. W. Reese received Navy Crosses and Fireman First Class W. T. Vail was awarded the Navy Distinguished Service Medal.

Having escaped one danger, George G. Henry encountered another before she reached New York. Shortly after midnight on 3 October 1918, about 110 miles (180 km) east of Cape Sable, she made an emergency turn to avoid an oncoming convoy, but to no avail. Her bow cut deeply into the collier Herman Frasch (ID-1617) forward of that ship's poop deck. The latter's bow rose perpendicularly, slipped back and crushed George G. Henry's port rail, hung suspended in the air for a few fleeting moments, and then slid off into the sea. George G. Henry immediately put over life rafts and boats, and with her searchlight beams sweeping the waves, searched for survivors. She picked up 65 men during the hunt which lasted until daybreak.

George G. Henry returned to New York on 6 October. After repairs at Shewen's Dry Dock, Brooklyn, New York, George G. Henry shifted to Bayonne, New Jersey, where she loaded a cargo of ammunition, gasoline, and military stores between 7 and 11 November. On the latter day – the day that the armistice ending World War I was signed – the ship touched briefly at Staten Island, New York, before sailing for France.

George G. Henry made three peacetime voyages to French ports – Le Havre, Rouen, Pauillac, Furt, and Blaye – carrying cargoes of oil from New York and Louisiana. After completing her last Naval Overseas Transportation Service (NOTS) voyage upon arrival at New York on 5 May 1919, George G. Henry entered Shewen's Dry Dock for voyage repairs three days later. There, she was decommissioned and returned to her owner on 21 May 1919, and her name was simultaneously struck from the Naval Vessel Register.

=== Commercial service as SS George G. Henry, 1919–1942 ===
Over the next two decades, George G. Henry plied the trade routes of the Atlantic and Pacific, first under the colors of the Pan-American Petroleum and Transport Co. and then for the Standard Oil Co. In July 1940 — due to the restrictions of the Neutrality Act – the ship was sold to the Panama Transport Co., a subsidiary of Standard Oil of New Jersey, and continued operating under Panamanian registry.

Laid-up for two months at Solomons Island, Maryland, for repairs, she was placed in service between South American (Caribbean) oil ports, the east coast of the United States, and the Canary Islands. She made six voyages in 1939; 17 in 1940; and 19 in 1941.

Her Far Eastern voyage in 1941 proved eventful. On 28 April 1941, George G. Henry sailed from New York; she subsequently loaded a cargo of petroleum products at Aruba, in the Netherlands West Indies, early in May and – after discharging that cargo at Balboa, Canal Zone, and at the ports of Golfito and Quepos Point, Costa Rica — proceeded to San Pedro, California There, she loaded a cargo earmarked for Far Eastern ports. She touched at Honolulu, Territory of Hawaii, to top off her own fuel bunkers and then pushed on to the Philippines, reaching Manila on 29 June, a little over two months out of New York.

Over the next six months, time-chartered to the Standard Vacuum Oil Company, George G. Henry carried oil from Balikpapan and Palembang, Dutch East Indies; Tarakan, Borneo; and Miri, Sarawak, to ports in the Philippines, to Shanghai, and to Hong Kong. Meanwhile, war clouds were thickening. In fact, as the tanker steamed toward Manila during the first few days of December 1941, Japanese invasion forces were already headed toward their jump-off points — their arrival timed to coincide with a diversionary strike to be launched against the ships of the United States Pacific Fleet at Pearl Harbor, Territory of Hawaii.

==== Japanese invasion of the Philippines ====
Oblivious to those events, George G. Henry arrived at Manila on 4 December 1941 with a cargo of 69,550 barrels (11,058 m^{3}) of oil that had been taken on board at Palembang, Java, and at Tanjong Oeban, on Bintang Island, near Singapore. By 8 December 1941 (7 December east of the International Date Line), the tanker had already discharged the part of her cargo consigned for delivery at Manila and was preparing to leave that port for Cebu, in the southern Philippines, to discharge the remainder. That, however, was not to be.

As she stood out of the harbor area, George G. Henry received a signal from the Army signal station on the island of Corregidor, at the entrance of Manila Bay: "No ships are allowed to leave port". It was not long before the merchant seamen on board found out the reason for that order: Pearl Harbor had been attacked. The United States and Japan were at war.

Although in civilian colors at the outset of hostilities, George G. Henry had acquired a coat of "war gray" by 10 December. On that day, she lay anchored in Manila Bay when Japanese planes came over just after noon and bombed the Cavite Navy Yard, almost erasing it from the face of the map. During the raid, bombs splashed near the tanker, between George G. Henry and the Filipino freighter Sagoland. "The nearest explosion", wrote a member of the tanker's crew later, "caused our ship to roll and vibrate as if she were breaking up on the rocks." Fortunately, the tanker emerged unscathed.

After that raid, it was obvious that Cavite and Manila Bay were not safe for surface ships. Hastily assembled convoys began heading southward, but George G. Henry remained behind where her vital cargo was needed. On 12 December – the day on which Japanese troops splashed ashore at Aparri and Vigan in northern Luzon and at Legaspi on the southeast coast of that island – George G. Henry was moored at Pier 7, the largest commercial pier in Manila's port area and an easily distinguishable landmark, to discharge her remaining cargo. By that evening, the tanker had pumped ashore 69,500 barrels (11,050 m^{3}) of oil to storage tanks ashore. That task completed, George G. Henry returned to her anchorage to await further orders.

Two days later, her master, Capt. Jens G. Olsen, received the authorization to take George G. Henry south – provided that the escape be made at night. Thus, at sunset on 15 December, George G. Henry headed for the channel through the minefield that had been sown between Corregidor and the Bataan peninsula. She soon discovered, however, that the channel – supposedly lighted with three buoys – was dark. As she slowed, a strong current carried the tanker inexorably toward the deadly minefield. George G. Henry went full speed astern and got out of immediate danger but still found herself in a very perilous situation.

Fortunately for George G. Henry, USS Bulmer came along and, when her commanding officer learned of the tanker's plight, led George G. Henry through the swept channel to safer waters. The tanker then proceeded unmolested across the Sulu Sea, steamed southward past the island of Tawi Tawi, and reached Balikpapan, Borneo, on 20 December, having made the passage from Manila in four days, eight hours, and three minutes – a record run according to her engineer's log.

There, George G. Henry filled her bunkers with 75,000 barrels (11,900 m^{3}) of fuel oil and sailed on Christmas Eve for the Netherlands East Indies. She reached Surabaya on the 26th and anchored offshore the next day to await further instructions. When she finally received those orders, the tanker proceeded to the south entrance of Surabaya Harbor, directly through unswept areas of minefields laid by the Dutch Navy.

==== Escape to Australia ====
Underway again on the last day of 1941, George G. Henry departed Surabaya, bound for Australian waters. Convoyed by USS Boise, Pope and John D. Ford — as well as by two submarines and the destroyer tender Black Hawk — the tanker reached Port Darwin, Australia, on 6 January 1942. Her first job was to pump 13,900 barrels (2,210 m^{3}) of fuel oil into the depleted bunkers of USS Pecos.

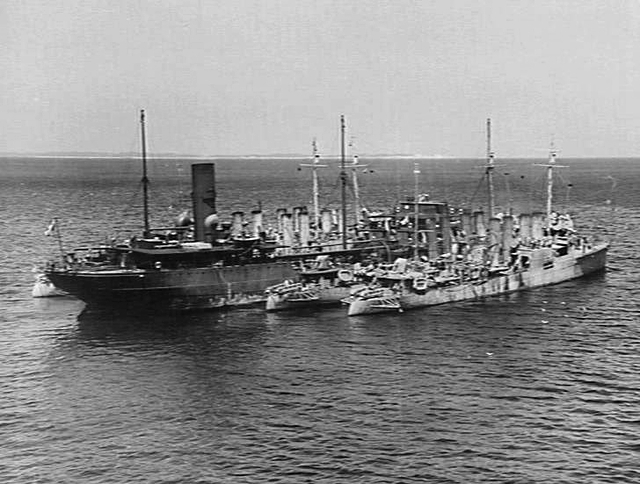
George G. Henry fueling four Clemson-class destroyers

George G. Henry remained at Port Darwin into early February, fueling ships of the Asiatic Fleet and, upon occasion, Australian naval vessels. Among her American customers were Langley, Tulsa, Lark, Heron, Alden, Barker, Bulmer, John D. Ford, Parrott, Peary, Pope, and William B. Preston.

By the second week of February, George G. Henry's, Balikpapan cargo was largely depleted; she thus departed Port Darwin on 11 February, bound for Fremantle. Barnacles and seaweed hampered the old tanker's progress, and she crept along at 7 knots, ultimately reaching her destination on 22 February.

George G. Henry, Trinity, and Pecos provided the hard-pressed units of the Asiatic Fleet with the vital fuel oil with which the men-of-war of that fleet battled against heavy odds, as did the dwindling numbers of Dutch, British, and Australian ships pushed before the Japanese tide of conquest. Ultimately, Japanese force proved too much. The Battle of the Java Sea on the last two days of February and the fall of Java less than a week later meant that the Japanese had managed to destroy the pre-war Dutch colonial empire and also conquered many British possessions as well. Within two months, the Philippines, too, would be in Japanese hands.

George G. Henry fueled the four surviving American ships that took part in the Battle of the Java Sea, the destroyers John D. Ford, Alden, Paul Jones, and John D. Edwards, soon after they arrived in Australian waters. By the end of March, there was less of a need to fuel surface ships of the Asiatic Fleet, so the tanker was dispatched to Melbourne, Australia, turning over hoses and fittings to the government-chartered tanker Erling Brovig, before she set sail for Melbourne on 29 March.

Reaching her destination on 8 April, George G. Henry began fueling Army transports for their return voyages to the United States. Her first customer at Melbourne was the former luxury liner SS President Coolidge which would embark former Philippine President Manuel Quezon for transportation to the United States. From her moorings, the men of the George G. Henry saw General Douglas MacArthur escort his friend Quezon on board President Coolidge before she sailed.

=== World War II as USS Victoria, 1942–1945 ===
==== 1942 ====
On 15 April 1942, while at Yarraville, a suburb of Melbourne, George G. Henry was taken over by the Navy under a bareboat charter. The ship's master, Capt. Jens G. Olsen (who, incidentally, had sailed in George G. Henry as a boatswain and had been the last civilian crewman to leave the ship when she was taken over by the Navy in World War I) – a member of the Naval Reserve – was called to active duty as a lieutenant commander and given command of the ship.

Taken to Sydney for extensive conversion, overhaul, and fitting-out for naval service, George G. Henry was first renamed — erroneously — Victor on 20 April, before the correct name, Victoria, was received upon the ship's arrival at Sydney on 25 April. Classified as AO-46, Victoria was fitted out for service at Mort's Dock and Engineering Co. (Chapman's Branch) under the supervision of Royal Australian Naval authorities at Garden Island. Survivors from USS Langley, Peary, and Pecos made up the ship's new crew.

Following the completion of the conversion — during which she received a battery of two 3-inch guns and machine guns — Victoria awaited further orders in Sydney Harbor. Underway on 18 November 1942 with a cargo of Navy special fuel, she joined a convoy of merchantmen, SS Paul Revere, SS Benjamin Franklin, and SS William Williams – the future USS Venus – escorted by two Australian corvettes, Whyalla and Townsville. En route, they were joined by another Australian corvette that served as an anti-submarine screen. After touching briefly at Brisbane on the 21st for further orders, the convoy now consisting of Victoria (guide) and Benjamin Franklin got underway for Townsville the following day. Reaching Cleveland Bay off Townsville, Victoria commenced fueling Allied warships in those waters and continued those duties at Challenger Bay, Palm Islands, on 3 December. She subsequently alternated serving at Challenger Bay and at Dunk Island Harbor before returning to Brisbane on Christmas Eve.

Victoria there became a unit of Task Force (TF) 50. The other ships in that group were Gold Star and Mizar. As ordered, the tanker fueled the warships of TF 44 — heavy cruiser HMAS Australia, light cruisers HMAS Hobart and USS Phoenix, and various destroyers. Victoria remained at Brisbane through New Year's Day 1943.

==== 1943 ====
Shifting to Townsville in company with the Australian minesweeper Geelong and the merchantman SS Jason Lee between 4 and 8 January, Victoria reached her destination on the 8th, where she remained for three days before shifting her operations back to Challenger Bay. For the next eight months, Victoria operated off the coasts and harbors of the Australian continent, ranging from Townsville to Cairns; from Brisbane to Dunk Island Harbor; from Sydney to Stoker Bay, Flinders Island; and to the Queensland ports of Mackay and Gladstone. During that time, the ship picked up the nickname "The Galloping Ghost of the Aussie Coast".

After that stint of operations, Victoria departed Townsville on 28 August 1943, in company with six merchantmen. On the 29th, four Australian naval vessels joined as escorts, as did LST-470 and the transport APc-2. Victoria and the rest of the convoy reached Milne Bay, New Guinea, on the last day of August.

Subsequently, Victoria, the Australian ammunition ship RFA (Royal Fleet Auxiliary) Yunnan, and APc-22 departed Milne Bay on 2 September, bound for Porlock Harbor, New Guinea. Victoria and her escorts reached that port on the 3rd, concurrently with the first assault echelon slated to land on the Huon Peninsula near Lae, New Guinea. The next day, Australian troops of the 9th Division went ashore in conjunction with a parachute landing in the Markham Valley.

Victoria remained at Porlock continuously for over two months, in an undefended harbor, in company with Yunnan, providing advance logistics base services. She furnished support for Destroyer Squadron 5 and other ships and was the only source of fuel oil north of Milne Bay during the Salamaua-Lae campaign. Early in October, the ship's fuel supply was replenished from the bunkers of the British tanker, SS Luxor.

Although the enemy resistance on shore at Lae, and later at Salamaua, was initially light, enemy air attacks, in strength, commenced about noon on the first day and continued at night from that point on. The attacks usually were conducted by small groups of enemy aircraft. Ships either arriving or departing the landing areas — and resupply echelons — usually came under persistent and determined aerial raids. The first damage occurred to the destroyer USS Conyngham on 4 September.

The air attacks conducted by the enemy never came in Victoria's direction, although the ship was within range of Japanese air bases on New Britain and New Guinea. Although radarless, the ship kept her radio tuned on the frequencies of the destroyers in the area. In that fashion, on the radio warning net, she kept abreast of the latest inbound raids.

On at least two occasions, Victoria interrupted fueling operations upon receipt of the warning and sounded general quarters. Lookouts picked out the "bogies" visually as Japanese, but the planes did not attack and remained out of gun range. At other times, men in Victoria could see the anti-aircraft fire blossoming in the skies over Oro Bay, 40 miles (64 km) away, and could hear the explosion of ordnance. "On such occasions", wrote Lt. Comdr. F. E. Clark, then the ship's executive officer, "we were agreeably surprised that the enemy did not attack the tempting target offered by a lightly armed oiler and ammunition ship lying in an undefended harbor."

Relieved by another old Asiatic Fleet companion – the oiler Trinity on 8 November 1943, Victoria hoisted anchor and headed for Milne Bay. Even her last day at Porlock Harbor was lively. An Army Air Corps P-38 Lightning from the 475th Fighter Group, 431st squadron went down nearby, and her pilot, 2nd Lt. John J. Durkin, USAAF, ditched into the water near the ship. Victoria's crew immediately hauled him on board, thus accomplishing the ship's first rescue. Reaching Milne Bay on 9 November after proceeding independently from Porlock Harbor, Victoria then pressed on, without escort, for Australian waters, reaching Brisbane on the 15th for a period of well-deserved recreation for the crew and engine repairs for the ship herself.

Five days before Christmas, with a full cargo of fuel, Victoria got underway for Townsville in company with 11 merchantmen, three LCI's, and three escort vessels. The convoy dispersed on the 21st, and Victoria proceeded independently to her destination on the 22nd, anchoring in Cleveland Bay to await further orders. On Christmas Eve, Convoy TN-197 was formed and sent on its way – Victoria included – to New Guinea. The ships reached Milne Bay on the 28th, where the convoy was dissolved. The following day, Victoria got underway for Buna, New Guinea. Soon after her arrival there later that day, she commenced fueling operations.

==== 1944 ====
Transferring the remainder of her cargo of fuel oil to Trinity on the last day of 1943, Victoria headed for Milne Bay on New Year's Day 1944. After loading fuel oil from SS Corinth, the oiler then proceeded to an anchorage near Milne Bay and commenced fueling Allied warships. On the 25th, Victoria rendezvoused at sea with Australian heavy cruiser, Shropshire, and fueled her. Two days later, she headed for Buna in company with the motor minesweeper YMS-73 and the subchasers SC-7 and SC-650 to discharge a cargo of fuel oil to Trinity. That mission completed, Victoria proceeded independently to Milne Bay, reaching there on 30 January.

Departing Milne Bay on 27 February, Victoria headed for Langemark Bay, Finschhafen, with Convoy BG-46, reaching her destination two days later. The ship subsequently fueled Allied warships in that port until 3 April, when she sailed for Seeadler Harbor, at Manus, in the Admiralty Islands.

Reaching that port on 5 April, Victoria immediately commenced fueling vessels in need. Because the harbor shore establishments were still not yet in full operating status, the valuable auxiliary ship acted as signal station for the harbor and cooperated with every activity requiring her assistance. For the work performed by the officers and men, Victoria was highly commended by the Commander, Subordinate Command, New Guinea Area.

Escorted by HMAS Kiama, Victoria departed Manus on 14 May, bound once again for New Guinea. She reached Humboldt Bay on the 16th and began the busiest fueling period of the ship's career. The ship frequently conducted her operations at night as well as during the day. From her anchorage, she could see enemy planes bombing Allied aerodromes nearby. At times like that, only her pumps were stopped while all hands remained ready to resume fueling when the "all clear" sounded.

During her time at Humboldt Bay, she fueled such ships as USS Nashville, Phoenix, Boise, as well as the Australian heavy cruisers Australia and Shropshire and numerous destroyers attached to those task forces.

After remaining at Humboldt Bay less than a month, Victoria got underway on 5 June, bound for Seeadler Harbor. Escorted by the fast transport Kilty and the frigate Ogden, the tanker reached her destination on the 7th and commenced fueling operations immediately. She subsequently sailed to Hollandia, arriving there on the 28th.

For the remainder of the summer, Victoria continued her vital support operations for the 7th Fleet as they conducted the "island-hopping" in the Southwest Pacific theater of war. She fueled Allied warships at Mios Woendi, at Humboldt Bay, and Hollandia. Operating out of Mios Woendi, Victoria fueled ships taking part in the assaults against the Philippines and Borneo that commenced that autumn. While at Mios Woendi, she fueled the badly damaged "jeep carriers" from the Battle of Leyte Gulf: USS Kalinin Bay, Fanshaw Bay, White Plains, and Kitkun Bay, on 29 October, four days after that epic battle.

==== 1945 ====
After refueling Task Group (TG) 78.6 off Biak, New Guinea, on 28 January 1945, Victoria resumed her routine fueling operations at Mios Woendi, duties she discharged through mid-April 1945. Proceeding independently for Hollandia on 19 April, Victoria reached her destination the next day, turning over cargo to the tanker Arayat (IX-134) and taking on stores that had accumulated for the ship at that port. She then pushed on for Seeadler Harbor, which she reached on 23 April.

After fueling Allied warships at Seeadler Harbor, Victoria was drydocked in ABSD-4 on 10 June for an overhaul. On the 16th, she was refloated and shifted to the Repair Base at Lombrum Point, Los Negros Island, for engine and hull work. That overhaul was completed on 21 August, a little less than a week after Japan capitulated.

The ship then loaded a full cargo and – under orders from Commander, Service Force, 7th Fleet – departed Seeadler Harbor on 22 August, bound for the Philippines. "If this 'Galloping Ghost' could speak", the ship's commanding officer wrote, "she would surely have said the same words as General MacArthur, 'I shall return." During the time that Victoria, ex-George G. Henry, had been away from the Philippine Archipelago, she had issued 2,136,228 barrels (339,633.1 m^{3}) of Navy special fuel oil.

Reaching Manila Bay on 2 September 1945 – the day that Japan signed the formal articles of surrender in Tokyo Bay – Victoria commenced fueling operations immediately. Less than a month later, her tour of duty in the Pacific theater at a close, Victoria departed the Philippines on orders from Commander, Service Squadron 7. The ship departed on that date with an "exceptionally well done" message from ComServRon 7 and Commander, Service Division 73. With 76 sailors embarked as passengers, Victoria headed for the United States.

Taking the "Great Circle Route" north of Mindanao, Kure, and Rivella Gigardo Islands, Victoria participated in an air-sea rescue operation a week after leaving Manila. On 18 October, she served as station ship for rescue planes and as radio ship for smaller ships involved in the operation that led to the rescue of crews from a ditched Boeing B-29 Superfortress and a Consolidated PBY Catalina. Three days later, the ship sank a large floating mine with gunfire.

Making port at Balboa, Canal Zone, on 15 November, the ship transited the Panama Canal on the next day and reached Cristóbal. She then sailed across the Gulf of Mexico to Mobile, Alabama, where she arrived on the 22nd. Decommissioned on 14 December 1945 and delivered to the War Shipping Administration (WSA) of the Maritime Commission simultaneously, Victoria was struck from the Naval Vessel Register on 8 January 1946.

== Awards ==
Victoria earned four battle stars during her World War II service.
