= James Jonas Madison =

US Naval commander

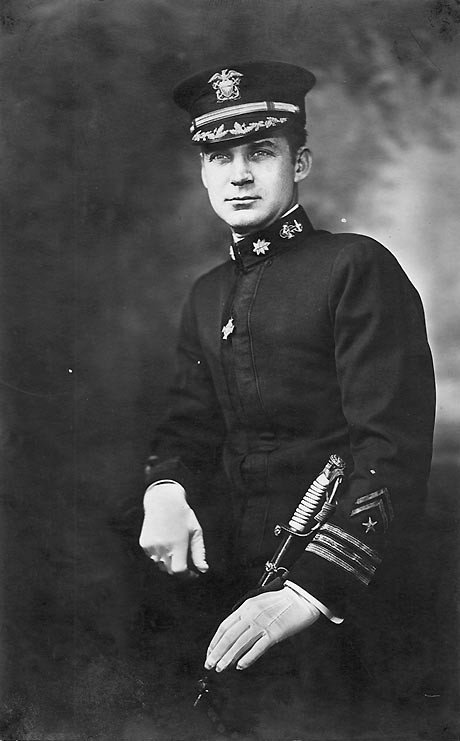
- Born: May 20, 1889; Jersey City, New Jersey
- Died: December 25, 1922 (aged 33); Brooklyn, New York
- Burial place: Fairview Cemetery
- Military career
- Allegiance: United States
- Branch: United States Naval Reserve
- Service years: 1917 - 1920
- Rank: Commander
- Commands: USS Ticonderoga
- Conflicts: World War I
- Awards: Medal of Honor

Commander James Jonas Madison, USNRF (May 20, 1889 – December 25, 1922) was an officer in the United States Naval Reserve and a World War I recipient of the Medal of Honor.

== Biography ==
James Jonas Madison was born in Jersey City, New Jersey, the son of Jonas and Christine Thomson Madison. Prior to World War I, Madison served as master of a Luckenbach Line ship. He received an appointment as lieutenant in the U.S. Naval Reserve Force on May 8, 1917. On December 27, 1917, he was promoted to lieutenant commander and given command of the cargo steamship USS Ticonderoga.

Under Madison's command, Ticonderoga carried cargoes to France three times through the summer of 1918. After loading at Norfolk from September 5–19, 1918, for what would be her fourth voyage, Ticonderoga steamed to New York where she joined a convoy bound for Europe. During the night of 29–30 September, the ship developed engine trouble and dropped behind the convoy. On the morning of September 30, 1918, the ship was attacked by the German submarine U-152. The U-boat's gunners opened fire at a range of 500 yards, targeting Ticonderoga’s bridge and forecastle, quickly putting the cargo vessel's forward gun out of action. The ship's 6-inch gun aft continued the battle. During the two-hour engagement, almost every man on board, including the commanding officer, suffered wounds. Commander Madison, in spite of severe wounds, continued to direct and maneuver the ship until forced to order her abandoned. After the order was finally given to abandon the sinking ship, Madison, who had lapsed into unconsciousness from loss of blood, was lowered into a lifeboat. Ultimately, the British steamer Moorish Prince rescued him, and 21 of his surviving crew, on 4 October 1918.

Madison was promoted to commander on May 13, 1919. Due to his injuries, he was retired on August 20, 1920. The effects of his wounds kept him hospitalized for much of the rest of his life, and he underwent several operations, one of which involved the amputation of a leg.

Madison died at the US Naval Hospital in Brooklyn, New York on December 25, 1922. He was interred at Fairview Cemetery (Fairview, New Jersey).

== Medal of Honor citation ==
Rank and organization: Lieutenant Commander, U.S. Naval Reserve Force. Born: May 20, 1884, Jersey City, N.J. Appointed from: Mississippi.

Citation:

For exceptionally heroic service in a position of great responsibility as commanding officer of the U.S.S. Ticonderoga, when, on 4 October 1918, that vessel was attacked by an enemy submarine and was sunk after a prolonged and gallant resistance. The submarine opened fire at a range of 500 yards, the first shots taking effect on the bridge and forecastle, 1 of the 2 forward guns of the Ticonderoga being disabled by the second shot. The fire was returned and the fight continued for nearly 2 hours. Lt. Comdr. Madison was severely wounded early in the fight, but caused himself to be placed in a chair on the bridge and continued to direct the fire and to maneuver the ship. When the order was finally given to abandon the sinking ship, he became unconscious from loss of blood, but was lowered into a lifeboat and was saved, with 31 others, out of a total number of 236 on board.

== Namesake ==
USS Madison (DD-425) was named for him. His widow, Ethel Herben Madison Meyn, was the ship's sponsor.

== See also ==
- List of Medal of Honor recipients for World War I
