= List of shipwrecks in February 1918 =

The list of shipwrecks in February 1918 includes ships sunk, foundered, grounded, or otherwise lost during February 1918.

== 1 February ==
List of shipwrecks: 1 February 1918
Ship	State	Description
Arrino	United Kingdom	World War I: The cargo ship was torpedoed and sunk in the English Channel 14 nautical miles (26 km) north west by west of Île Vierge, Finistère, France (48°43′N 4°54′W) by SM U-90 (Imperial German Navy). Her crew survived.
Cavallo	United Kingdom	World War I: The cargo ship was torpedoed and sunk in the Atlantic Ocean 6 nautical miles (11 km) north west of Trevose Head, Cornwall (50°36′N 5°10′W) by SM U-46 (Imperial German Navy) with the loss of three crew.
HMT Cleon	Royal Navy	World War I: The naval trawler struck a mine and sank in the English Channel off Folkestone, Kent with the loss of twelve of her crew.
HMS E50	Royal Navy	World War I: The E-class submarine struck a mine and sank in the North Sea off the South Dogger Lightship (United Kingdom).
Kindly Light	United Kingdom	World War I: The ketch was shelled and sunk in the Atlantic Ocean 10 nautical miles (19 km) east north east of Trevose Head (50°38′N 5°49′W) by SM U-101 (Imperial German Navy). Her crew survived.
La Dives	France	World War I: The passenger ship was torpedoed and sunk in the Mediterranean Sea 54 nautical miles (100 km) north west of Cape Carbon, Algeria (37°25′N 4°18′E) by SM UB-52 (Imperial German Navy) with the loss of 134 lives.

== 2 February ==
List of shipwrecks: 2 February 1918
Ship	State	Description
Avanti	United Kingdom	World War I: The cargo ship was torpedoed and sunk in the English Channel 4 nautical miles (7.4 km) south east by east of St. Alban's Head, Dorset by SM UB-59 (Imperial German Navy) with the loss of 22 of her crew.
Celia	United Kingdom	World War I: The cargo ship was torpedoed and sunk in the Mediterranean Sea 44 nautical miles (81 km) east by north of Cap de Creus, Spain (42°39′N 4°08′E) by SM UB-48 (Imperial German Navy). Her crew survived.
Edilio	Italy	World War I: The cargo ship was torpedoed and sunk in the Mediterranean Sea 40 nautical miles (74 km) east by north of Cap de Creus by SM UB-48 (Imperial German Navy).
Esterel	Italy	World War I: The sailing vessel was scuttled in the Mediterranean Sea off Bizerta, Algeria by SM UC-54 (Imperial German Navy).
Ida	Italy	World War I: The sailing vessel was scuttled in the Mediterranean Sea off Bizerta by SM UC-54 (Imperial German Navy).
Jaffa	United Kingdom	World War I: The cargo ship was torpedoed and sunk in the English Channel 3 nautical miles (5.6 km) east by south of the Owers Lightship (United Kingdom) by SM UB-30 (Imperial German Navy) with the loss of ten of her crew.
SMS Kleiss	Imperial German Navy	World War I: The Kabeljau-class Vorpostenboot was sunk by mines north west of Sylt.
Marie Magdeleine	France	World War I: The sailing vessel was sunk in the Bristol Channel 4 nautical miles (7.4 km) north west of Lundy Island, Devon, United Kingdom by SM U-101 (Imperial German Navy).
Newminster Abbey	United Kingdom	World War I: The cargo ship was torpedoed and sunk in the Mediterranean Sea 44 nautical miles (81 km) east by north of Cap de Creus by SM UB-48 (Imperial German Navy). Her crew survived.
HMT Remindo	Royal Navy	World War I: The naval trawler was torpedoed and sunk in the Seine Estuary by SM UC-79 (Imperial German Navy) with the loss of twenty of her crew.
SMS Rheinfels	Imperial German Navy	The Vorpostenboot was lost on this date.
SMS Seestern	Imperial German Navy	World War I: The Neuwerk-class Vorpostenboot was sunk by mines west of Horns Reef.
Sofie	United Kingdom	World War I: The coaster was sunk in the Bristol Channel by SM U-101 (Imperial German Navy) with the loss of eight crew.

== 3 February ==
List of shipwrecks: 3 February 1918
Ship	State	Description
Aboukir	United Kingdom	World War I: The cargo ship was shelled and sunk in the Mediterranean Sea 20 nautical miles (37 km) east by south of Cap de Creus, Spain (42°20′N 3°40′E) by SM UB-48 (Imperial German Navy). Her crew survived, but her captain was taken as a prisoner of war.
SMS Brockeswalde	Imperial German Navy	The Vorpostenboot was lost on this date.
SMS Flensburg	Imperial German Navy	World War I: The Flensburg-class Vorpostenboot was sunk by mines off northern Friesland.
Holmtown	United Kingdom	World War I: The coaster was sunk in the English Channel off the Shambles Lightship (United Kingdom) by SM UB-59 (Imperial German Navy) with the loss of all fifteen crew.
Lofoten	United Kingdom	World War I: The coaster was torpedoed and sunk in the English Channel 7 nautical miles (13 km) south east by east of Start Point, Devon (50°11′N 3°29′W) by SM UB-38 (Imperial German Navy) with the loss of seventeen of her crew.
Lutece	France	World War I: The cargo ship was torpedoed and sunk in the Bristol Channel 5 nautical miles (9.3 km) west of the Godrevy Lighthouse (50°14′N 5°32′W) by SM U-46 (Imperial German Navy). Her crew survived.
Svanfos	Norway	World War I: The coaster was sunk in the Atlantic Ocean west of the Orkney Islands, United Kingdom (59°12′N 3°55′W) by SM UB-72 (Imperial German Navy). Her crew survived.
SMS Weddigen	Imperial German Navy	World War I: The Greier-class Vorpostenboot was sunk by mines off Horns Reef.

== 4 February ==
List of shipwrecks: 4 February 1918
Ship	State	Description
Aurania	United Kingdom	World War I: The troopship was torpedoed and damaged in the Atlantic Ocean 15 nautical miles (28 km) north west of Inistrahull, County Donegal by SM UB-67 (Imperial German Navy) with the loss of nine crew. Aurania was taken in tow but ran aground at Tobermory, Isle of Mull. She subsequently broke up and was a total loss.
Maid of Harlech	United Kingdom	World War I: The sailing vessel was shelled and sunk in the Mediterranean Sea 46 nautical miles (85 km) north by west of Cape Ivi, Algeria (36°46′N 0°02′E) by SM UB-52 (Imperial German Navy). Her crew survived.
Participation	Italy	World War I: The cargo ship was torpedoed and sunk in the Mediterranean Sea off Villajoyosa, Alicante, Spain (38°26′N 0°13′W) by SM U-64 (Imperial German Navy). Her crew survived.
Standish Hall	United Kingdom	World War I: The collier was torpedoed and sunk in the Mediterranean Sea 38 nautical miles (70 km) west by north of Alexandria, Egypt by SM U-33 (Imperial German Navy). Her crew survived.
Treveal	United Kingdom	World War I: The cargo ship was torpedoed and sunk off The Skerries, Isle of Anglesey by SM U-53 (Imperial German Navy) with the loss of 33 crew.
SM UC-50	Imperial German Navy	World War I: The Type UC II submarine was depth charged and sunk in the English Channel off Dungeness, Kent, United Kingdom by HMS Zubian (Royal Navy).

== 5 February ==
List of shipwrecks: 5 February 1918
Ship	State	Description
Almanace	United States	World War I: The cargo ship was sunk in the Atlantic Ocean 4 nautical miles (7.4 km) off Maiden's Head, Ireland by SM UB-57 (Imperial German Navy) with the loss of six of her crew.
Caprera	Italy	World War I: The passenger ship was sunk in the Mediterranean Sea of Villajoyosa, Alicante, Spain (38°26′N 0°09′W) by SM U-64 (Imperial German Navy). Her crew survived.
Cresswell	United Kingdom	World War I: The cargo ship was torpedoed and sunk in the Bristol Channel 18 nautical miles (33 km) east by north of the Kish Lightship (United Kingdom) (53°29′N 5°30′W) by SM U-46 (Imperial German Navy). Her crew survived.
Cross Rip Lightship	United States Lighthouse Service	The lightship was swept off station by ice. She was last seen east of Great Round Shoal. Lost with all six hands.
HMT Idena	Royal Navy	The 128.9-foot (39.3 m), 270-ton steam minesweeping naval trawler was abandoned in damaged condition and scuttled by shelling off Tromso.
Mexico City	United Kingdom	World War I: The cargo ship was torpedoed and sunk in the Irish Sea 15 nautical miles (28 km) west by south of South Stack, Anglesey by SM U-101 (Imperial German Navy) with the loss of 29 crew.
Panama Dredge No. 4	United States	The dredge was lost at sea on a journey from Colon, Panama to Savannah, Georgia.
Sebastian	Spain	World War I: The cargo ship was sunk in the Atlantic Ocean south west of Madeira, Portugal (29°12′N 19°15′W) by SM U-152 (Imperial German Navy). Her crew survived.
Tuscania	United Kingdom	World War I: Convoy HX 20: The ocean liner was torpedoed and sunk in the Atlantic Ocean 7 nautical miles (13 km) north of Rathlin Island, County Donegal (55°37′N 6°26′W) by SM UB-77 (Imperial German Navy) with the loss of 210 lives.

== 6 February ==
List of shipwrecks: 6 February 1918
Ship	State	Description
Duca di Genova	Italy	World War I: The passenger ship was damaged in the Mediterranean Sea 1 nautical mile (1.9 km) off Cape Canet, Spain (39°36′N 0°11′W) by SM U-64 (Imperial German Navy). She was beached but was declared a total loss.
Glenartney	United Kingdom	World War I: The cargo ship was torpedoed and sunk in the Mediterranean Sea 30 nautical miles (56 km) north east of Cape Bon, Algeria by SM UC-54 (Imperial German Navy) with the loss of two of her crew.
Harry R.	United States	The barge was driven ashore at Saybrook, Connecticut.
Holkar	United Kingdom	World War I: The fishing smack was shelled and sunk in the Atlantic Ocean off Trevose Head, Cornwall (50°39′N 5°10′W) by SM U-53 (Imperial German Navy). Her crew survived.
Marsouin	France	World War I: The fishing vessel was shelled and sunk in the Atlantic Ocean off Trevose Head (50°55′N 4°55′W) by SM U-53 (Imperial German Navy).
HMT Nathaniel Cole	Royal Navy	The naval trawler foundered in Lough Swilly off Buncrana, County Donegal with the loss of all hands.
Ville de Verdun	France	World War I: The cargo ship was torpedoed and sunk in the Mediterranean Sea off Guardamar, Spain (38°03′N 0°36′W) by SM U-34 (Imperial German Navy) with the loss of ten crew.

== 7 February ==
List of shipwrecks: 7 February 1918
Ship	State	Description
SMS A10	Imperial German Navy	World War I: The A1-class torpedo boat struck a mine and sank in the North Sea off the coast of Belgium with the loss of nineteen of her crew.
Albert A. Young	Canada	The schooner was abandoned in the Atlantic Ocean (approximately 57°N 28°W). Her crew were rescued.
Ardbeg	United Kingdom	World War I: The coaster was shelled and sunk in the Irish Sea 32 nautical miles (59 km) north of the Liverpool Bar Lightship (United Kingdom) by SM UB-57 (Imperial German Navy). Her crew survived.
Ayuthia	United Kingdom	The cargo ship caught fire and sank at Rangoon, Burma.
Beaumaris	United Kingdom	World War I: The cargo ship was torpedoed and damaged in the Atlantic Ocean 2.5 nautical miles (4.6 km) off the Longships Lighthouse by SM U-53 (Imperial German Navy). She was beached in Whitesand Bay but was a total loss. Her crew survived.
Ben Rein	United Kingdom	World War I: The coaster was shelled and sunk in the Irish Sea 35 nautical miles (65 km) west north west of the Liverpool Bar Lightship (United Kingdom) by SM UB-57 (Imperial German Navy). Her crew survived.
RFA Creosol	Royal Navy	World War I: The tanker was torpedoed and sunk in the North Sea 5 nautical miles (9.3 km) east north east of Seaham, County Durham (54°52′N 1°12′W) by SM UC-17 (Imperial German Navy) with the loss of two of her crew.
Elfi	Norway	World War I: The cargo ship was torpedoed and sunk in the North Sea 3 nautical miles (5.6 km) south east of Sunderland, County Durham by SM UC-17 (Imperial German Navy) with the loss of six of her crew.
Fridland	Sweden	World War I: The cargo ship was torpedoed, shelled and sunk in the North Sea (54°34′N 4°10′E) by a Kaiserliche Marine submarine with the loss of six of her crew.
G32	Regia Marina	World War I: The naval trawler was torpedoed and sunk in the Gulf of Genoa off Livorno, Tuscany by SM UB-49 (Imperial German Navy). Her crew survived.
Limesfield	United Kingdom	World War I: The coaster was shelled and sunk in the Irish Sea 25 nautical miles (46 km) off Maughold Head, Isle of Man by SM UB-57 (Imperial German Navy). Her crew survived.
Sturton	United Kingdom	World War I: The cargo ship was torpedoed and sunk in the Mediterranean Sea 15 nautical miles (28 km) south east by east of Porquerolles, Var, France (42°54′N 6°30′E) by SM UB-48 (Imperial German Navy). Her crew survived.

== 8 February ==
List of shipwrecks: 8 February 1918
Ship	State	Description
Agnes Madre	Italy	World War I: The sailing vessel was scuttled in the Mediterranean Seas south of Sardinia (38°24′N 8°10′E) by SM U-64 (Imperial German Navy).
Artesia	United Kingdom	World War I: The tanker was scuttled in the Atlantic Ocean 190 nautical miles (350 km) north west of Madeira, Portugal by SM U-156 (Imperial German Navy) with the loss of a crew member.
Basuta	United Kingdom	World War I: The cargo ship was torpedoed and sunk in the Atlantic Ocean 45 nautical miles (83 km) south south west of The Lizard, Cornwall (49°13′N 5°21′W by SM U-53 (Imperial German Navy). with the loss of a crew member. Survivors were rescued by Royal Navy destroyers.
HMS Boxer	Royal Navy	The Ardent-class destroyer collided with St. Patrick (United Kingdom) in the English Channel and sank.
Chariton	Greece	World War I: The cargo ship was sunk in the Atlantic Ocean off Madeira (34°22′N 14°00′W) by SM U-156 (Imperial German Navy).
Emily Anderson	United Kingdom	The schooner was abandoned in the Atlantic Ocean (approximately 48°N 27°W). Her crew survived.
Emma Felice	Italy	World War I: The sailing vessel was sunk in the Mediterranean Sea south of Sardinia (38°25′N 8°23′E) by SM U-64 (Imperial German Navy).
Kia Ora	United Kingdom	World War I: The Thames barge was scuttled in the English Channel 30 nautical miles (56 km) north by west of Dieppe, Seine-Inférieure, France by SM UB-33 (Imperial German Navy). Her crew survived.
Mette	Denmark	World War I: The schooner was scuttled in the Mediterranean Sea south of La Ganoupe, France, by SM UB-49 (Imperial German Navy). Her crew survived.
Nuzza	Italy	World War I: The barque was sunk in the Atlantic Ocean west of Gibraltar (34°33′N 13°40′W) by SM U-156 (Imperial German Navy).
Straton	United Kingdom	World War I: The trawler struck a mine and sank in the North Sea 25 nautical miles (46 km) east of the Humber Lightship (United Kingdom).
SM UB-38	Imperial German Navy	World War I: The Type UB II submarine struck a mine and sank in the North Sea (50°56′N 1°25′E) with the loss of all 27 crew.

== 9 February ==
List of shipwrecks: 9 February 1918
Ship	State	Description
Armenia	United States	World War I: The cargo liner was torpedoed and damaged in the English Channel 9 nautical miles (17 km) south of St. Catherine's Point, Isle of Wight, United Kingdom by SM UB-30 (Imperial German Navy). She was beached but was later salvaged.
Atlantide	Italy	World War I: The cargo ship was sunk in the Atlantic Ocean off Madeira, Portugal (34°40′N 14°00′W) by SM U-156 (Imperial German Navy).
Ceferino	Spain	World War I: The cargo ship was sunk in the Atlantic Ocean off the coast of Rio de Oro (15°42′N 19°06′W by SM U-152 (Imperial German Navy).
Express	United Kingdom	The cargo-passenger ship, on a voyage from Leith to Kirkwall was struck by HMS Grenville (Royal Navy), was cut in two and sank about 10 nautical miles (19 km) east of Grim Ness, Orkney (58°49′N 2°22′W). All on board were lost - eleven crew and two Royal Marines gunners.
Fantoft	Norway	World War I: The cargo ship struck a mine and sank in the Bay of Biscay off Belle Île, Morbihan, France (47°31′N 3°13′W) with the loss of six of her crew.
Lydie	United Kingdom	World War I: The collier was torpedoed and sunk in the Atlantic Ocean 1 nautical mile (1.9 km) east by south of The Manacles, Cornwall (50°03′N 5°01′W) by SM U-53 (Imperial German Navy with the loss of two of her crew.
Maggie Smith	United Kingdom	World War I: The fishing vessel struck a mine and sank in the North Sea 3 nautical miles (5.6 km) north of the Bell Rock with the loss of three of her crew.

== 10 February ==
List of shipwrecks: 10 February 1918
Ship	State	Description
Mae	United States	The steamer was beached on Cuttyhunk Island, Massachusetts, after she hit a reef.
Pilgrim	United Kingdom	The ketch was driven ashore and wrecked at Beaumaris, Anglesey. Her crew were rescued.
Romford	United Kingdom	World War I: The cargo ship struck a mine and sank in the Mediterranean Sea 2.5 nautical miles (4.6 km) east of Cape Carthage, Tunisia (36°54′N 10°24′E) by SM UC-67 (Imperial German Navy) with the loss of 28 of her crew.

== 11 February ==
List of shipwrecks: 11 February 1918
Ship	State	Description
Baku Standard	United Kingdom	World War I: The tanker was torpedoed and sunk in the North Sea 5 nautical miles (9.3 km) south by west of Tod Head, Aberdeenshire by SM UC-58 (Imperial German Navy) with the loss of 24 of her crew.
Bo	Sweden	The cargo ship sank in La Palice after two subsequent collisions, one within a convoy and the last, fatal one while maneuvring into the harbour. The crew survived.
Diane	French Navy	The Diane-class submarine was sunk in the Bay of Biscay off La Pallice, Vendée by an internal explosion with the loss of all 43 crew.
Golden Light	United Kingdom	The schooner sank in the Bristol Channel off Lundy Island, Devon. Her crew survived.
Merton Hall	United Kingdom	World War I: The cargo ship was torpedoed and sunk in the Atlantic Ocean 30 nautical miles (56 km) north by west of Ouessant, Finistère, France (48°38′N 4°56′W) by SM U-53 (Imperial German Navy) with the loss of 57 crew.
HMS Westphalia	Royal Navy	World War I: The Q-ship was torpedoed and sunk in the Irish Sea 25 nautical miles (46 km) east of Drogheda, County Louth (53°48′N 5°51′W) by SM U-97 (Imperial German Navy) with the loss of 46 of her crew.

== 12 February ==
List of shipwrecks: 12 February 1918
Ship	State	Description
Aghios Nicholaos	Greece	World War I: The sailing vessel was sunk in the Aegean Sea (38°28′N 23°49′E) by SM UC-37 (Imperial German Navy).
Eleanor	United Kingdom	World War I: The cargo ship was torpedoed and sunk in the English Channel 9 nautical miles (17 km) off St. Catherine's Point, Isle of Wight (50°30′N 1°30′W) by SM UB-57 (Imperial German Navy) with the loss of 34 of her crew.
Italia	Sweden	The cargo ship collided with another vessel while in convoy and sank. Her twenty crew were rescued.
Montenegro	France	The schooner foundered in the Mediterranean Sea.
Polo	United Kingdom	World War I: The cargo ship was torpedoed and sunk in the English Channel 6 nautical miles (11 km) south east by east of St. Catherine's Point by SM UB-57 (Imperial German Navy) with the loss of three of her crew.
St. Magnus	United Kingdom	World War I: The passenger ship was torpedoed and sunk in the North Sea 3 nautical miles (5.6 km) north north east of Peterhead, Aberdeenshire (57°32′15″N 1°43′36″W) by SM UC-58 (Imperial German Navy) with the loss of five lives.
SM U-89	Imperial German Navy	World War I: The Type U 87 submarine was rammed and sunk in the Atlantic Ocean north west of Malin Head, County Donegal, United Kingdom (55°38′N 7°32′W) by HMS Roxburgh (Royal Navy) with the loss of all 43 crew.

== 13 February ==
List of shipwrecks: 13 February 1918
Ship	State	Description
Bernoulli	French Navy	World War I: The Brumaire-class submarine struck a mine and sank in the Adriatic Sea off Durrës, Albania.
Italia	Sweden	The ship collided with Carperby (United Kingdom) and sank in the North Sea 60 nautical miles (110 km) north east of Peterhead, Aberdeenshire, United Kingdom.
HMT Sardius II	Royal Navy	The 116.1-foot (35.4 m), 206-ton naval trawler struck Runnelstone Rock just before midnight 12 February. She was badly holed and began to settle, drifting into Pendower Cove, one mile (1.6 km) north of Tol-Pedin-Penwith and was driven ashore just after midnight on 13 February to become a total wreck. The crew were rescued by HMT King Frederick (Royal Navy).

== 14 February ==
List of shipwrecks: 14 February 1918
Ship	State	Description
Atlas	United Kingdom	World War I: Convoy HZ 8: The cargo ship was torpedoed and sunk in the North Sea 10 nautical miles (19 km) east south east of Hartlepool, County Durham by SM UC-71 (Imperial German Navy). Her crew survived.
Bessie Stephens	United Kingdom	World War I: The schooner was shelled and sunk in the Bristol Channel 10 nautical miles (19 km) west by south of Lundy Island, Devon by SM U-86 (Imperial German Navy). Her crew survived.
Carlisle Castle	United Kingdom	World War I: The cargo ship was torpedoed and sunk in the English Channel 8 nautical miles (15 km) east by north of the Royal Sovereign Lightship (United Kingdom) by SM UB-57 (Imperial German Navy) with the loss of a crew member.
Chrysopolis	United Kingdom	The cargo ship ran aground in the Irish Sea off Southport, Lancashire.
Donetsk	Soviet Navy Red Movement	Allied intervention in the Russian Civil War: The gunboat was damaged at Valcov on the Danube River by Romanian artillery and beached.
Hugh Bourne	United Kingdom	The tug struck a submerged wreck and foundered. Her crew were rescued.
Lenore	United Kingdom	The brigantine collided with another vessel and sank. Her crew were rescued.
Margaret	United States	The barge sank in the channel leading to Shop Dock at New Haven, Connecticut.
Saga	United Kingdom	World War I: The cargo ship was torpedoed and sunk in the North Sea 4 nautical miles (7.4 km) east north east of Sunderland, County Durham (54°56′N 1°19′W) by SM UB-64 (Imperial German Navy). Her crew survived.
SMS Vegesack	Imperial German Navy	The Vorpostenboot was lost on this date.
Ventmoor	United Kingdom	World War I: The cargo ship was torpedoed and sunk in the Aegean Sea 8 nautical miles (15 km) south west by south of Skyros, Greece (38°41′N 24°36′E) by SM UC-37 (Imperial German Navy) with the loss of 21 of her crew.
War Monarch	United Kingdom	World War I: The cargo ship was torpedoed and sunk in the English Channel 11 nautical miles (20 km) east of the Royal Sovereign Lightship (United Kingdom) (50°46′N 0°43′E) by SM UB-57 (Imperial German Navy). Her crew survived.

== 15 February ==
List of shipwrecks: 15 February 1918
Ship	State	Description
HMT Christina Craig	Royal Navy	World War I - Action of 15 February 1918: The naval trawler was sunk in the Strait of Dover by a Kaiserliche Marine destropyer with the loss of all hands.
HMT Clover Bank	Royal Navy	World War I - Action of 15 February 1918: The naval trawler was sunk in the Strait of Dover by a Kaiserliche Marine warship with the loss of all but one of her crew.
HMT Cosmos	Royal Navy	World War I - Action of 15 February 1918: The naval trawler was sunk in the Strait of Dover by a Kaiserliche Marine destroyer. Three of her crew survived.
HMT James Pond	Royal Navy	World War I - Action of 15 February 1918: The naval trawler was sunk in the Strait of Dover by a Kaiserliche Marine warship with the loss of three of her crew.
HMT Jamie Murray	Royal Navy	World War I - Action of 15 February 1918: The naval trawler was sunk in the Strait of Dover by a Kaiserliche Marine destroyer.
Kilgis	Soviet Navy Red Movement	Allied intervention in the Russian Civil War: The tugboat was damaged on the Danube River by No. 4 and No. 5 (both Royal Romanian Navy) and was beached and destroyed.
HMS Ludgate	Royal Navy	The tug was wrecked in Wigtown Bay.
HMML 12	Royal Navy	World War I - Action of 15 February 1918: The motor launch was shelled and sunk in the Strait of Dover by a Kaiserlich Marine destroyer.
Neguri	Spain	World War I: The cargo ship was sunk in the Atlantic Ocean (29°11′N 20°30′W) by SM U-152 (Imperial German Navy). Her crew survived.
San Rito	United Kingdom	World War I: The cargo ship was torpedoed and sunk in the Aegean Sea 23 nautical miles (43 km) south west of Chios, Greece (37°51′N 25°33′E) by SM UC-37 (Imperial German Navy) with the loss of three of her crew.
HMT Silver Queen	Royal Navy	World War I - Action of 15 February 1918: The naval trawler was sunk in the Strait of Dover by a Kaiserliche Marine destroyer.
HMT Veracity	Royal Navy	World War I - Action of 15 February 1918: The naval trawler was sunk in the Strait of Dover by a Kaiserliche Marine destroyer.
HMT W. Elliott	Royal Navy	World War I - Action of 15 February 1918: The naval trawler was sunk in the Strait of Dover by a Kaiserliche Marine destroyer.

== 16 February ==
List of shipwrecks: 16 February 1918
Ship	State	Description
Carlo	Austria-Hungary	The cargo ship was wrecked in the Adriatic Sea off Vegl, Austria-Hungary.
Commander	United Kingdom	World War I: The fishing smack was scuttled in the English Channel 8 nautical miles (15 km) south south west of Beer Head, Devon by SM UB-33 (Imperial German Navy). Her crew survived.
Mar Caspio	Spain	World War I: The cargo ship was sunk in the Atlantic Ocean west of the Canary Islands by SM U-152 (Imperial German Navy).
Tea	Italy	World War I: The cargo ship was sunk in the Atlantic Ocean south west of Cape St. Vincent, Portugal (35°30′N 10°28′W) by SM U-155 (Imperial German Navy).
Thames	United Kingdom	The tug was lost on this date.

== 17 February ==
List of shipwrecks: 17 February 1918
Ship	State	Description
Estrella da Bissao	Portugal	World War I: The sailing vessel was sunk in the Atlantic Ocean off Freetown, Sierra Leone by SM U-157 (Imperial German Navy).
Northville	United Kingdom	World War I: The collier was torpedoed and sunk in the English Channel 3.5 nautical miles (6.5 km) south east by east of Berry Head, Devon (50°23′N 3°24′W) by SM UB-33 (Imperial German Navy). Her crew survived.
Pinewood	United Kingdom	World War I: The collier was shelled and sunk in the Atlantic Ocean 15 nautical miles (28 km) south of Mine Head, County Cork (51°50′N 7°35′W) by SM U-86 (Imperial German Navy) with the loss of two of her crew.

== 18 February ==
List of shipwrecks: 18 February 1918
Ship	State	Description
Cecil L. Shave	United Kingdom	World War I: The schooner was shelled and sunk in the Atlantic Ocean off the Azores, Portugal (35°30′N 11°20′W) by SM U-155 (Imperial German Navy).
Nagata Maru	Japan	The cargo ship ran aground off Kirosaki, Niigata. She broke up on 12 March and was a total loss.
Normand	France	World War I: The cargo ship was torpedoed and damaged in the Mediterranean Sea off Marsa Sirocco, Malta by SM UB-52 (Imperial German Navy). She was beached on Malta two days later. Subsequently refloated, repaired and returned to service.

== 19 February ==
List of shipwrecks: 19 February 1918
Ship	State	Description
Barge No. 802	United States	The barge sank at Penninger and Manchester's coal dock, Newport, Rhode Island.
Barrowmore	United Kingdom	World War I: The cargo ship was torpedoed and sunk in the Atlantic Ocean 53 nautical miles (98 km) north west by west of the Bishop Rock, Isles of Scilly (49°58′N 7°54′W) by SM U-94 (Imperial German Navy) with the loss of 25 of her crew.
Beacon Light	United Kingdom	World War I: The tanker was torpedoed and sunk in the Atlantic Ocean 15 nautical miles (28 km) south east of the Butt of Lewis, Outer Hebrides by SM U-91 (Imperial German Navy) with the loss of 33 of her crew.
Comandant Baratier	France	World War I: The sailing vessel was scuttled in the English Channel 8 nautical miles (15 km) south of Penzance, Cornwall, United Kingdom by SM UB-33 (Imperial German Navy).
Commonwealth	United Kingdom	World War I: The cargo ship was torpedoed and sunk in the North Sea 5 nautical miles (9.3 km) north east of Flamborough Head, Yorkshire by SM UC-71 (Imperial German Navy) with the loss of fourteen of her crew.
Glencarron	United Kingdom	World War I: The cargo ship was torpedoed and sunk in the Atlantic Ocean 47 nautical miles (87 km)) south by east of The Lizard, Cornwall (49°20′N 4°57′W) by SM U-82 (Imperial German Navy). Her crew survived.
Philadelphian	United Kingdom	World War I: The cargo ship was torpedoed and sunk in the Atlantic Ocean 47 nautical miles (87 km) south by east of The Lizard by SM U-82 (Imperial German Navy) with the loss of four of her crew.
Wheatflower	United Kingdom	World War I: The coaster was shelled and sunk in the Atlantic Ocean 10 nautical miles (19 km) north west by north of the Tuskar Rock, Ireland (52°09′N 5°45′W) by SM U-86 (Imperial German Navy) with the loss of a crew member.
Wilhelmina VII	Netherlands	World War I: The fishing vessel was shelled and sunk in the North Sea (54°49′N 3°37′E), probably by SM UB-64 (Imperial German Navy) with the loss of six of her crew.

== 20 February ==
List of shipwrecks: 20 February 1918
Ship	State	Description
Balgray	United Kingdom	World War I: The cargo ship was torpedoed and sunk in the Mediterranean Sea 38 nautical miles (70 km) south west by west of Dellimara Point, Malta (35°07′N 14°01′E) by SM UB-52 (Imperial German Navy). Her crew survived.
Djerv	United Kingdom	World War I: The cargo ship was torpedoed and sunk in the Irish Sea 12 nautical miles (22 km) north north west of The Skerries, Isle of Anglesey (53°41′N 4°32′W) by SM U-86 (Imperial German Navy) with the loss of two of her crew.
USS Gallup	United States Navy	The naval trawler/minesweeper was driven ashore at Cape Henlopen, Delaware. Her crew was rescued before she broke in two and became a total loss.
Huntsmoor	United Kingdom	World War I: The cargo ship was torpedoed and sunk in the English Channel 23 nautical miles (43 km) south west of the Owers Lightship (United Kingdom) by SM UB-40 (Imperial German Navy) with the loss of twenty of her crew.
Hagios Nicolaos	Greece	World War I: The sailing vessel was sunk in the Bay of Pelgonesi by SM UC-23 (Imperial German Navy).
Harrogate	United Kingdom	The coaster foundered and sank in a storm off Norway
Kithira	Greece	World War I: The cargo ship was sunk in the Atlantic Ocean off the coast of Morocco (10°11′N 16°04′W) by SM U-157 (Imperial German Navy). Her crew survived.
Maria Archis	Greece	World War I: The sailing vessel was sunk in the Aegean Sea by SM UC-23 (Imperial German Navy).
Snowdrop	United Kingdom	World War I: The fishing smack was shelled and sunk in the Atlantic Ocean 8 nautical miles (15 km) south west of the Eddystone Lighthouse (50°03′N 4°21′W) by SM UB-33 (Imperial German Navy). Her crew survived.
Taxi Arches	Greece	World War I: The sailing vessel was sunk in the Aegean Sea by SM UC-23 (Imperial German Navy).
Taxiarchis	Greece	World War I: The schooner was sunk in the Mediterranean Sea (32°06′N 29°08′E) by SM UB-53 (Imperial German Navy).
Zeno	United Kingdom	World War I: The cargo ship was torpedoed and sunk in the Mediterranean Sea 48 nautical miles (89 km) south west of Dellimara Point, Malta (35°04′N 14°03′E) by SM UB-52 (Imperial German Navy). Her crew survived.

== 21 February ==
List of shipwrecks: 21 February 1918
Ship	State	Description
Bør	Norway	World War I: The cargo ship was sunk in the North Sea off Coquet Island, Northumberland, United Kingdom by SM UC-49 (Imperial German Navy) with the loss of a crew member.
Cheviot Range	United Kingdom	World War I: The cargo ship was torpedoed, shelled and sunk in the English Channel 25 nautical miles (46 km) south of The Lizard, Cornwall by SM U-102 (Imperial German Navy) with the loss of 27 crew.
Hugin	Sweden	World War I: The cargo ship was sunk in the Atlantic Ocean 4.5 nautical miles (8.3 km) off St Agnes, Cornwall (50°28′N 5°12′W) by SM U-60 (Imperial German Navy). Her crew survived.
Idalia	United Kingdom	World War I: The fishing ketch was scuttled in the English Channel 10 nautical miles (19 km) south east of Berry Head, Devon (50°27′N 3°14′W) by SM UB-33 (Imperial German Navy). Her crew survived.
Irex	United Kingdom	World War I: The fishing smack was scuttled in the English Channel 10 nautical miles (19 km) east by south of Hope Cove, Devon (50°27′N 3°14′W) by SM UB-33 (Imperial German Navy). Her crew survived.
Leonora	United Kingdom	World War I: The fishing ketch was shelled and sunk in the English Channel 11 nautical miles (20 km) east of Hope's Nose, Devon (50°27′N 3°14′W) by SM UB-33 (Imperial German Navy). Her crew survived.
Mercia	Sweden	World War I: The cargo ship was sunk in the North Sea 85 nautical miles (157 km) east of Peterhead, Aberdeenshire, United Kingdom (57°43′N 2°28′E) by SM UB-86 (Imperial German Navy). The crew of eighteen did not survive.
Oryx	United Kingdom	World War I: The fishing smack was shelled and sunk in the English Channel 10 nautical miles (19 km) south east by south of Berry Head, Devon (50°27′N 3°14′W) by SM UB-33 (Imperial German Navy). Her crew survived.
Reaper	United Kingdom	World War I: The drifter struck a mine and sank in the North Sea 2 nautical miles (3.7 km) north east of Tynemouth, Northumberland with the loss of eight of her crew.
Rio Verde	United Kingdom	World War I: The cargo ship was torpedoed and sunk in then Irish Sea 4 nautical miles (7.4 km) off Crammock Head, Wigtownshire by SM U-100 (Imperial German Navy) with the loss of twenty of her crew.
Rosebud	United Kingdom	World War I: The fishing smack was scuttled in the English Channel 10 nautical miles (19 km) south south east of Hope Cove by SM UB-33 (Imperial German Navy). Her crew survived.
SM U-23	Austro-Hungarian Navy	World War I: The U-20-class submarine was sunk in the Strait of Otranto by the Italian destroyer Airone (Regia Marina) with the loss of all 18 crew.

== 22 February ==
List of shipwrecks: 22 February 1918
Ship	State	Description
Blue Ribbon	United States	The Barge sank at the wharf of the Connecticut Power Company, Shelton, Connecticut.
Haileybury	United Kingdom	World War I: The cargo ship was torpedoed and sunk in the Irish Sea 15 nautical miles (28 km) east south east of The Maidens by SM U-91 (Imperial German Navy) with the loss of two of her crew.
Igotz Mendi	Imperial German Navy	World War I: The Spanish steamer was captured by SMS Wolf (Imperial German Navy) on 10 November 1917. She ran aground in thick fog off Denmark while heading for Kiel. The prize crew and prisoners of war were taken off by a Danish Navy gunboat. The vessel was refloated and returned to her owners later.
Reidar	United Kingdom	The cargo ship struck a rock and foundered with the loss of a crew member.

== 23 February ==
List of shipwrecks: 23 February 1918
Ship	State	Description
Aspasia	Greece	World War I: The sailing vessel was sunk in the Aegean Sea by SM UC-23 (Imperial German Navy).
Birchleaf	United Kingdom	World War I: The tanker was torpedoed, shelled and severely damaged in the Irish Sea 20 nautical miles (37 km) west by north of The Skerries, Anglesey by SM U-91 (Imperial German Navy) with the loss of three of her crew. Her captain was taken as a prisoner of war. Birchleaf was salvaged, repaired and returned to service.
British Viscount	United Kingdom	World War I: The tanker was torpedoed and sunk in the Irish Sea 12 nautical miles (22 km) north by west of The Skerries, Anglesey by SM U-91 (Imperial German Navy) with the loss of six of her crew.
Edinorog	Soviet Navy	The Bars-class submarine took on water and foundered while under tow in the Gulf of Finland after leaving Reval.
Florizel	Newfoundland	The passenger ship ran aground at Horn Head Point, Cappahayden and was wrecked with the loss of 94 lives.
Henry Plauth	United States	The Barge sank at the wharf of R.E. Smith and Company, Providence, Rhode Island. Raised and returned to service.
Humberto	Portugal	World War I: The barquentine was scuttled in the Mediterranean Sea 10 nautical miles (19 km) south east of Cape Tortosa, Spain by SM U-35 (Imperial German Navy).
HMT Marion	Royal Navy	World War I: The 125.7-foot (38.3 m), 255-ton steam minesweeping naval trawler struck a mine and sank in the Mediterranean Sea off Filfla Island, Malta (35°45′N 14°23′E) with the loss of six of her crew.
Remus	United Kingdom	World War I: The collier struck a mine and sank in the North Sea 6 nautical miles (11 km) south south west of Copinsay, Orkney Islands (58°20′N 2°42′W) with the loss of five of her crew.
Sardinero	Spain	World War I: The cargo ship was sunk in the Atlantic Ocean west of Gibraltar (34°30′N 8°40′W) by SM U-155 (Imperial German Navy). Her crew survived.
Ulabrand	Norway	World War I: The cargo ship was torpedoed and sunk in the Irish Sea 2 nautical miles (3.7 km) off Crammag Head, Wigtownshire, United Kingdom (54°40′N 5°03′W) by SM U-86 (Imperial German Navy) with the loss of thirteen of her crew.

== 24 February ==
List of shipwrecks: 24 February 1918
Ship	State	Description
Amsterdam	United Kingdom	World War I: The coaster was torpedoed and sunk in the North Sea 3 nautical miles (5.6 km) south east by east of Coquet Island, Northumberland by SM UC-49 (Imperial German Navy) with the loss of four of her crew.
Gaetana Costanzo	Italy	World War I: The cargo ship was sunk in the Atlantic Ocean off Rio de Oro (24°18′N 15°49′W) by SM U-152 (Imperial German Navy).
Renfrew	United Kingdom	World War I: The cargo ship was torpedoed and sunk in St. George's Channel 8 nautical miles (15 km) south west of St. Ann's Head, Pembrokeshire by SM U-91 (Imperial German Navy) with the loss of 40 of her crew.
Sarpfos	Norway	World War I: The cargo ship was sunk in the Irish Sea off Holyhead, Anglesey, United Kingdom (53°46′N 5°04′W) by SM U-105 (Imperial German Navy) with the loss of two crew.

== 25 February ==
List of shipwrecks: 25 February 1918
Ship	State	Description
Apollo	Denmark	World War I: The schooner was sunk in St. George's Channel by SM U-60 (Imperial German Navy) with the loss of all seven crew.
Golden West	United States	After her gasoline engine broke down and her anchor lines parted in strong winds and heavy seas, the 23-gross register ton fishing vessel was wrecked when she drifted onto rocks on the west coast of Graham Island in the Queen Charlotte Islands off the coast of British Columbia in Canada. Her crew of three escaped to the beach, from which the motor vessel Libanon (flag unknown) rescued them on 4 March.
HMS H15	Royal Navy	The British H-class submarine sank at the Fore River Shipyard, Quincy, Massachusetts while under construction. Refloated and finished.
Rubio	United Kingdom	World War I: The collier struck a mine and sank in the North Sea 4 nautical miles (7.4 km) north of the Shipwash Lightship (United Kingdom). Her crew survived.
Santa Maria	United States	World War I: The tanker was sunk in Lough Swilly, County Donegal, United Kingdom (55°14′N 6°19′W) by SM U-19 (Imperial German Navy). Her crew survived.

== 26 February ==
List of shipwrecks: 26 February 1918
Ship	State	Description
Berkley	United States	The barge went to pieces after going ashore on Block Island, Rhode Island. Some gear was salvaged.
USS Cherokee	United States Navy	The tug foundered in the Atlantic Ocean 12 miles (19 km) off the Fenwick Island Lightship ( United States Lighthouse Service) with the loss of 28, or 32, of her 42 crew. Survivors were rescued by British Admiral (United Kingdom).
Dalewood	United Kingdom	World War I: The collier was torpedoed and sunk in the Irish Sea 10 nautical miles (19 km) south west of the Isle of Man (53°48′N 5°09′W) by SM U-105 (Imperial German Navy) with the loss of nineteen crew.
Eumaeus	United Kingdom	World War I: Convoy HE 6: The cargo ship was torpedoed and damaged in the English Channel 24 nautical miles (44 km) north north east of Île Vierge, Finistère, France by SM U-55 (Imperial German Navy). She was taken in tow by HMS Crocus (Royal Navy) and was scuttled by that ship after the tow parted. Her crew survived.
HMHS Glenart Castle	Royal Navy	(Red Cross): World War I: The hospital ship was torpedoed and sunk in the Bristol Channel 10 nautical miles (19 km) west of Lundy Island, Devon (51°07′N 5°03′W) by SM UC-56 (Imperial German Navy) with the loss of 162 lives.
Greavesash	United Kingdom	World War I: The collier was torpedoed and sunk in the English Channel 10 nautical miles (19 km) north east of Cape Barfleur, Manche, France by SM UB-74 (Imperial German Navy) with the loss of eight of her crew.
Maltby	United Kingdom	World War I: The collier was torpedoed and sunk in the Mediterranean Sea 10 nautical miles (19 km) west by south of Pantelleria, Italy, by SM UC-27 (Imperial German Navy) with the loss of five of her crew.
USS Mariner	United States Navy	The tug foundered in a storm off Long Island, New York. The crew were rescued by USS Wadena (United States Navy).
Mouche	France	World War I: The sailing vessel was sunk in the English Channel 25 nautical miles (46 km) south east of The Lizard, Cornwall, United Kingdom by SM U-55 (Imperial German Navy).
Pytheas	Norway	World War I: The cargo ship was sunk in the Mediterranean Sea 40 nautical miles (74 km) south by east of Cape Palos, Murcia, Spain by SM U-35 (Imperial German Navy) with the loss of two crew.
Rambler	United Kingdom	World War I: The trawler struck a mine and sank in the North Sea 4 nautical miles (7.4 km) east of Blyth, Northumberland with the loss of nine of her crew.
Romny	United Kingdom	World War I: The cargo ship was torpedoed and sunk in the English Channel 10 nautical miles (19 km) off Cape Barfleur by SM UB-74 (Imperial German Navy) with the loss of nine of her crew.
Saida	France	World War I: The sailing vessel was sunk in the Mediterranean Sea 50 nautical miles (93 km) off Cyprus by SM UB-53 (Imperial German Navy).
Siljestad	Norway	World War I: The cargo ship was sunk in the Atlantic Ocean (23°36′N 16°16′W) by SM U-152 (Imperial German Navy). Her crew survived.
Snyg	Norway	World War I: The cargo ship was sunk in the Atlantic Ocean 20 nautical miles (37 km) north by east of Ouessant, Finistère, France (48°51′N 5°12′W) by SM U-94 (Imperial German Navy) with the loss of four of her crew.
South America	United States	The barge sank at New Haven, Connecticut.
Tiberia	United Kingdom	World War I: The cargo ship was torpedoed and sunk in Belfast Lough (54°47′N 5°39′W) by SM U-19 (Imperial German Navy). Her crew survived.

== 27 February ==
List of shipwrecks: 27 February 1918
Ship	State	Description
Elmwood	United Kingdom	The schooner was driven ashore and wrecked.
Largo	United Kingdom	World War I: The collier was torpedoed and sunk in the Irish Sea 12 nautical miles (22 km) west of the Calf of Man, Isle of Man (53°52′N 5°02′W) by SM U-105 (Imperial German Navy). Her crew survived.
Machaon	United Kingdom	World War I: The cargo ship was torpedoed and sunk in the Mediterranean Sea 50 nautical miles (93 km) north by east of the Cani Rock (38°40′N 10°35′E) by SM UC-27 (Imperial German Navy). Her crew survived.

== 28 February ==
List of shipwrecks: 28 February 1918
Ship	State	Description
Bellande	Netherlands	The galeas was driven ashore near the Gjeita Lighthouse, Sogn og Fjordane, Norway and was wrecked. Her crew were rescued.
HMS Brown Mouse	Royal Navy	The Q-ship was lost on this date.
Hagios Triast	Greece	World War I: The sailing vessel was sunk in the Aegean Sea by SM UC-23 (Imperial German Navy).
Heenvliet	Netherlands	World War I: The coaster was sunk in the North Sea 15 nautical miles (28 km) south west of the Swartebank Lightship (Netherlands) by SM UB-31 (Imperial German Navy).
HMT Nerissa II	Royal Navy	The naval trawler was wrecked on the Valanhidi Shoal, in the Aegean Sea off Lemnos, Greece.
Savoyarde	France	World War I: The sailing vessel struck a mine sank in the La Galite Channel.

== Unknown date ==
List of shipwrecks: Unknown date 1918
Ship	State	Description
Caroline	United States	The steamer was destroyed by fire at Sausalito, California either on 18 November 1917 or in February 1918.
Colleen	United Kingdom	The schooner was abandoned. She came ashore and was wrecked.
Crescendo	United Kingdom	The schooner foundered in the Atlantic Ocean south of Iceland in late February with the loss of four of her six crew.
LV-6	United States Lighthouse Service	The lightship was dragged off station and carried out to sea by moving ice while on Cross Rip Station off Nantucket, Massachusetts, and sank. All six crewmen perished.
Maria Lorenza	Spain	The brigantine foundered in the Bay of Biscay 90 nautical miles (170 km) off Santander, Spain.
