= Arayat =

Arayat may refer to:

- Arayat, Pampanga, a municipality in the Philippines
- Japanese patrol boat No. 105 (1931) formerly the Arayat, a Philippine Commonwealth customs inspection cutter sunk and rebuilt by the Imperial Japanese Navy in 1942
- Mount Arayat, a mountain in the Philippines
- USS Arayat (IX-134), a petroleum tanker built in 1918
