= Fairview Cemetery (Fairview, New Jersey) =

Coordinates: 40.8148228°N 74.0054171°W

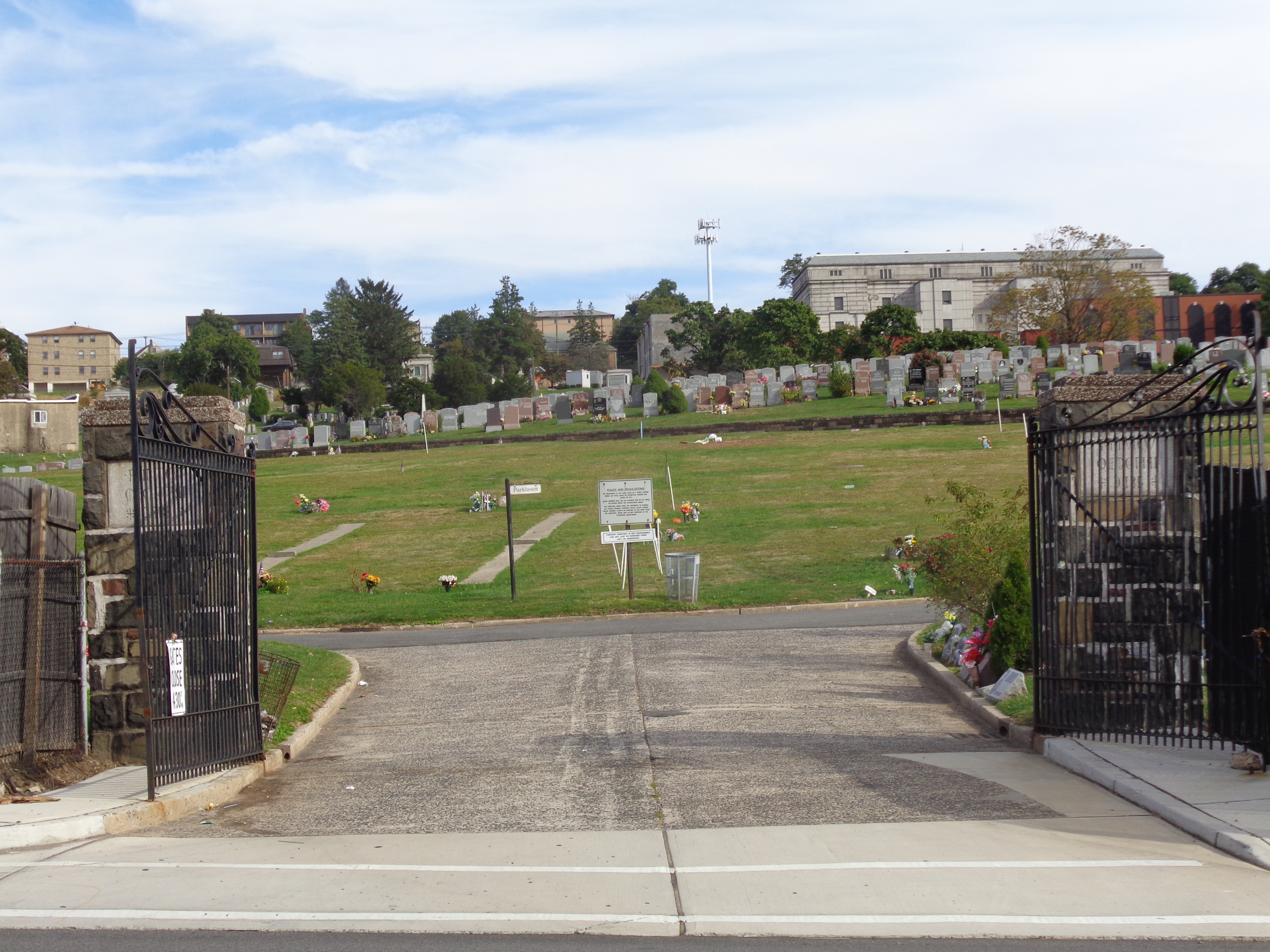
- Interactive map of Fairview Cemetery

Details
- Location: 500 Fairview Avenue; Fairview, Bergen County, New Jersey
- Country: United States
- Type: Non-denominational
- Website: Official website
- Find a Grave: Fairview Cemetery

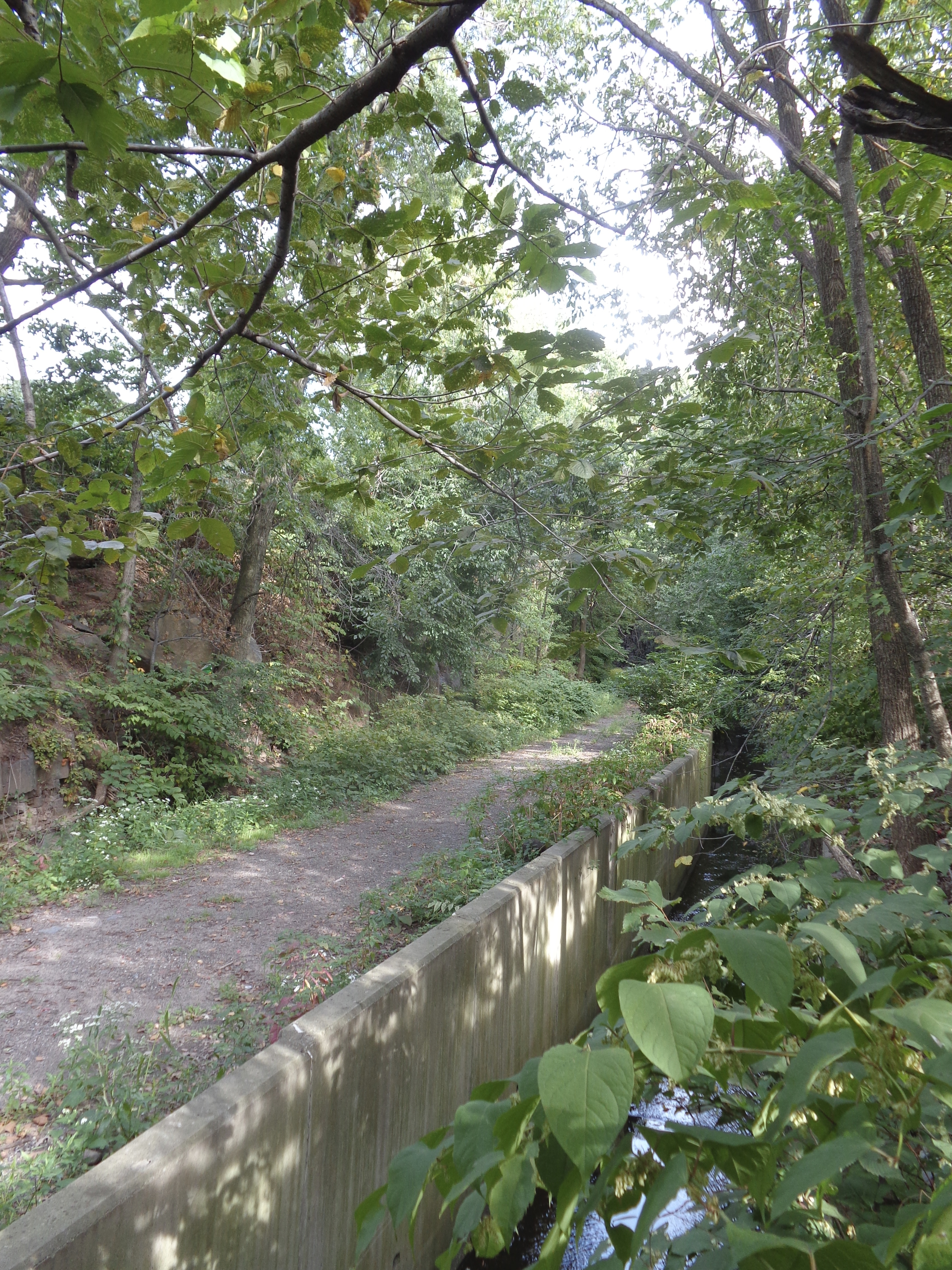
NYS&W railroad right-of-way at western portal of tunnel through Palisades to Edgewater passes through the grounds

Fairview Cemetery, also known as Fairview Memorial Park and Mausoleum, is a burial ground in Fairview, Bergen County, New Jersey in the United States, located on the western slopes of the Hudson Palisades. It is bordered by North Bergen, Broad Avenue, and Fairview Avenue, across from which is Mount Moriah Cemetery. The New York, Susquehanna and Western Railroad right-of-way at western portal of the Edgewater Tunnel passes through the cemetery.

== Notable interments ==
There are several graves of Spanish–American War veterans in the cemetery.

Among others interred are:

- August Chandron (1866–1947), United States Navy Medal of Honor recipient
- Alexander Esau (1957–1977), Murder victim of serial killer David Berkowitz, aka Son of Sam
- Willie Garoni (1877–1914), Professional baseball player
- Ray Gillen (1959–1993), American rock singer
- Gilbert Hatfield (1855–1921), Major League baseball player
- James Jonas Madison (1884–1922), World War I Medal of Honor recipient
- John Marin (1870–1953), American artist
- Willard Marshall (1921–2000), Major League baseball player
- William Musto (1917–2006), Democratic politician from Union City
- Eddie August Schneider (1911–1940), American aviator
- Isabel Patterson Springer (1880–1917), Socialite and subject of book Murder at Brown Palace
- Marshall Van Winkle (1869–1957), United States Congressman

== See also ==
- List of New Jersey cemeteries
- List of cemeteries in Hudson County, New Jersey
