= USS Ticonderoga (1918) =

Cargo ship of the United States Navy

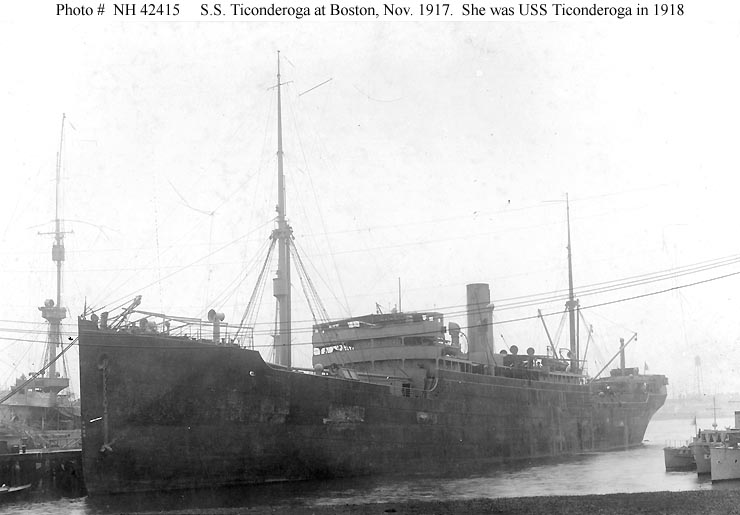

History

United States
- Name: USS Ticonderoga
- Launched: 13 January 1914
- Acquired: by seizure, 1917
- Commissioned: 5 January 1918
- Fate: Sunk in battle, 30 September 1918

General characteristics
- Type: Steamship
- Tonnage: 5,130 long tons (5,212 t) gross
- Length: 401 ft 1 in (122.25 m)
- Beam: 53 ft 2 in (16.21 m)
- Draft: 25 ft 6 in (7.77 m)
- Depth of hold: 27 ft 6 in (8.38 m)
- Speed: 11 knots (20 km/h; 13 mph)
- Armament: 1 × 6 in (150 mm) gun; 1 × 3 in (76 mm) gun

The third USS Ticonderoga was a steamship in the United States Navy which served as a cargo ship.

She was originally built as Camilla Rickmers, a steamer, in 1914 by Rickmers Aktien Gesellschaft, at Bremerhaven, Germany, and operated by Rickmers Reederei & Schiffbau Aktien Gesellschaft. She was seized by United States Customs officials in 1917; turned over to the Navy; fitted out as an animal transport; renamed Ticonderoga; and commissioned at Boston in the Naval Overseas Transportation Service (NOTS) on 5 January 1918.

== Service history ==
=== Voyages between US and France ===
Ticonderoga departed Boston on 16 January and reached Newport News, Virginia, three days later. There, she loaded a cargo of automobiles, trucks, animals, and sundry other Army supplies before moving north to New York City to join a convoy which sailed for France on 20 February. Ticonderoga entered port at Brest on 7 March and began discharging her cargo. She completed unloading operations and departed France on the 23rd to return to the United States. She arrived at New York on 8 April and the following day headed for Norfolk, Virginia, to undergo repairs and take on cargo before returning to New York on the 30th.

On 3 May, Ticonderoga steamed out of New York harbor once more, bound for Europe. She reached Brest on 18 May and proceeded southeast along the coast of France to the Gironde estuary where she unloaded her cargo and took on ballast for the return voyage. The transport put to sea on 10 June and entered Hampton Roads 15 days later. Ticonderoga took on another Army shipment at Newport News and joined an east-bound convoy at New York on 12 July. She delivered her cargo at the Gironde estuary once more, laying over there from 28 July to 21 August before heading home.

=== Battle with U-152 ===
Ticonderoga loaded another Army cargo at Norfolk between 5 and 19 September. She then steamed to New York where she joined a convoy bound for Europe. On 22 September, Ticonderoga cleared New York for the last time. During the night of the 29th and 30th, the transport developed engine trouble and dropped behind the convoy. At 05:20 the following morning, she sighted the German submarine SM U-152 running on the surface; and she cleared for action. For the next two hours, her gun crews fought the enemy in a losing battle. The U-boat's gunners put her forward gun out of commission after six shots, but the 6-inch gun aft continued the uneven battle. Almost every man on board Ticonderoga, including her captain, suffered wounds. Eventually, the submarine's two 5.9-inch guns succeeded in silencing Ticonderoga's remaining gun. At 07:45, Ticonderoga slipped beneath the sea. Of the 237 sailors and soldiers embarked, only 24 survived. Twenty-two of those survivors were in one lifeboat and were picked up by the British steamer SS Moorish Prince four days later. The other two, the executive officer and the first assistant engineer, were taken prisoner on board the U-boat and eventually landed at Kiel, Germany, when U-152 completed her cruise. Ticonderoga's name was subsequently struck from the Navy list.

Lieutenant Commander James Jonas Madison received the Medal of Honor for his actions on Ticonderoga.
