= Hugh Miller (Medal of Honor) =

United States Navy sailor and peacetime recipient of the Medal of Honor

- Born: 1859; Philadelphia, Pennsylvania, US
- Died: Unknown
- Military career
- Allegiance: United States
- Branch: United States Navy
- Rank: Boatswain's Mate
- Unit: USS Quinnebaug
- Awards: Medal of Honor

Hugh Miller (born 1859, date of death unknown) was a United States Navy sailor and a recipient of the United States military's highest decoration, the Medal of Honor.

== Biography ==
Born in 1859 in Philadelphia, Pennsylvania, Miller joined the Navy from that state. By November 21, 1885, he was serving as a boatswain's mate on the USS Quinnebaug. On that morning, while Quinnebaug was at Alexandria, Egypt, he and another sailor, Seaman Apprentice Second Class August Chandron, jumped overboard and rescued Ordinary Seaman William Evans from drowning. For this action, both Miller and Chandron were awarded the Medal of Honor.

Miller's official Medal of Honor citation reads:

For jumping overboard from the U.S.S. Quinnebaug, at Alexandria, Egypt, on the morning of 21 November 1885 and assisting in saving a shipmate from drowning.

== See also ==
- List of Medal of Honor recipients during peacetime
