= August Chandron =

US Navy sailor and Medal of Honor recipient (1866–1947)

- Navy Medal of Honor
- Born: August 15, 1866; Saverne, France
- Died: March 28, 1947 (aged 80–81); Cliffside Park, New Jersey
- Burial place: Fairview Cemetery; Fairview, New Jersey
- Military career
- Allegiance: United States of America
- Branch: United States Navy
- Service years: 1882–1887
- Rank: Seaman Apprentice, Second Class
- Unit: USS Quinnebaug
- Awards: Medal of Honor

August Chandron (b. August 15, 1866, d. March 28, 1947) was a United States Navy sailor and a recipient of the United States military's highest decoration, the Medal of Honor.

== Biography ==
Born in France, Chandron immigrated to the United States and joined the Navy from New York at age 16. By November 21, 1885, he was serving as a seaman apprentice, second class, on the USS Quinnebaug. On that morning, while Quinnebaug was at Alexandria, Egypt, he and another sailor, Boatswain's Mate Hugh Miller, jumped overboard and rescued Ordinary Seaman William Evans from drowning. For this action, both Chandron and Miller were awarded the Medal of Honor. He was discharged on his 21st birthday in August 1887.

Chandron's official Medal of Honor citation reads:

On board the U.S.S. Quinnebaug, Alexandria, Egypt, on the morning of 21 November 1885. Jumping overboard from that vessel, Chandron, with the aid of Hugh Miller, boatswain's mate, rescued William Evans, ordinary seaman, from drowning.

== See also ==
- List of Medal of Honor recipients in non-combat incidents
