= USS Quinnebaug (1875) =

Sloop-of-war of the United States Navy

History

United States
- Name: USS Quinnebaug
- Builder: Neafie & Levy
- Launched: 28 September 1875
- Commissioned: 2 October 1878
- Decommissioned: 3 July 1889
- Stricken: 21 November 1889
- Fate: Sold, 25 March 1891

General characteristics
- Type: Corvette
- Tonnage: 1,900 long tons (1,930 t)
- Length: 216 ft (66 m)
- Beam: 37 ft (11 m)
- Draft: 16 ft 6 in (5.03 m)
- Complement: 212 officers and enlisted
- Armament: 8 × rifles; 1 × 60-pounder Parrott rifle; 6 × 9 in (230 mm) Dahlgren smoothbores; 1 × light 12-pounder howitzer; 1 × 3 in (76 mm) gun

The second USS Quinnebaug was a screw corvette in the United States Navy.

Quinnebaug was completed under contract by Neafie & Levy at the Philadelphia Navy Yard, but she is occasionally listed as a rebuilt version of the first Quinnebaug. She was launched on 28 September 1875, but completion was delayed due to lack of government appropriations, and consequently the vessel did not enter commission until 2 October 1878, when Commander Norman H. Farquhar took command.

== Service history ==
Quinnebaug departed Philadelphia on 17 October 1878 for fitting out at Norfolk, Virginia. She got underway in January 1879 and reached Gibraltar on 2 February to begin a decade of service on the European Station, interrupted only by a brief visit home in the summer of 1881. During this service she operated for the most part in the Mediterranean, steaming from the straits to the Levant and visiting numerous ports along both the European and African coasts of that ancient sea and center of culture. She also usually made an annual cruise along the Atlantic Coast of Europe visiting ports in Spain, Portugal, France, England, Denmark and Germany. Three of her crew received the Medal of Honor for rescuing shipmates from drowning during this period: Landsman Patrick J. Kyle at Mahón, Menorca, on 13 March 1879, and Seaman Apprentice Second Class August Chandron and Boatswain's Mate Hugh Miller at Alexandria, Egypt, on 21 November 1885.

Departing Gibraltar on 9 May 1889, Quinnebaug returned to the New York Navy Yard on 17 June 1889. She decommissioned there on 3 July, was struck from the Navy List on 21 November 1889, and was sold on 25 March 1891.
