= SM UB-33 =

Coordinates: 50°56′N 1°17′E

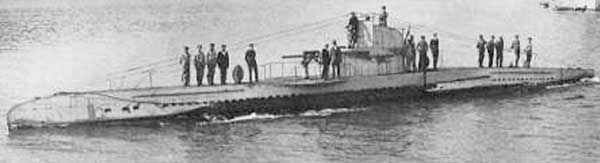
- SM UB-45, a U-boat similar to UB-33

History

German Empire
- Name: UB-33
- Ordered: 22 July 1915
- Builder: Blohm & Voss, Hamburg
- Cost: 1,152,000 German Papiermark
- Yard number: 257
- Launched: 5 December 1915
- Completed: 20 April 1916
- Commissioned: 22 April 1916
- Fate: Sunk 11 April 1918

General characteristics
- Class & type: Type UB II submarine
- Displacement: 274 t (270 long tons) surfaced; 303 t (298 long tons) submerged
- Length: 36.90 m (121 ft 1 in) o/a; 27.90 m (91 ft 6 in) pressure hull
- Beam: 4.37 m (14 ft 4 in) o/a; 3.85 m (12 ft 8 in) pressure hull
- Draught: 3.69 m (12 ft 1 in)
- Propulsion: 1 × propeller shaft; 2 × 6-cylinder diesel engine, 270 PS (200 kW; 270 bhp); 2 × electric motor, 280 PS (210 kW; 280 shp)
- Speed: 9.06 knots (16.78 km/h; 10.43 mph) surfaced; 5.71 knots (10.57 km/h; 6.57 mph) submerged
- Range: 7,030 nmi (13,020 km; 8,090 mi) at 5 knots (9.3 km/h; 5.8 mph) surfaced; 45 nmi (83 km; 52 mi) at 4 knots (7.4 km/h; 4.6 mph) submerged
- Test depth: 50 m (160 ft)
- Complement: 2 officers, 21 men
- Armament: 2 × 50 cm (19.7 in) torpedo tubes; 4 × torpedoes (later 6); 1 × 8.8 cm (3.5 in) Uk L/30 deck gun
- Notes: 42-second diving time

Service record
- Part of: Baltic Flotilla; 22 June 1916 - 24 October 1917; Flandern Flotilla; 24 October 1917 - 11 April 1918
- Commanders: Oblt. Herbert Lefholz; 22 April 1916 – 30 January 1917; Oblt. Waldemar von Fischer; 1 February – 21 March 1917; Oblt. Karl Ruprecht; 22 March – 16 September 1917; Oblt. Fritz Gregor; 17 September 1917 – 11 April 1918
- Operations: 17 patrols
- Victories: 13 merchant ships sunk (5,390 GRT); 2 merchant ships damaged (6,575 GRT); 3 merchant ships taken as prize (1,527 GRT)

SM UB-33 (Note: "SM" stands for "Seiner Majestät" (English: His Majesty's) and combined with the U for Unterseeboot would be translated as His Majesty's Submarine.) was a German Type UB II submarine or U-boat in the German Imperial Navy (German: Kaiserliche Marine) during World War I. The U-boat was ordered on 22 July 1915 and launched on 5 December 1915. She was commissioned into the German Imperial Navy on 22 April 1916 as SM UB-33.

The submarine sank thirteen ships, damaged two others, and took a further three as prizes in seventeen patrols.

== Design ==
A Type UB II submarine, UB-33 had a displacement of 274 tonnes (270 long tons) when at the surface and 303 tonnes (298 long tons) while submerged. She had a total length of 36.90 m (121 ft 1 in), a beam of 4.37 m (14 ft 4 in), and a draught of 3.69 m (12 ft 1 in). The submarine was powered by two Benz six-cylinder diesel engines producing a total 270 metric horsepower (270 shp; 200 kW), two Siemens-Schuckert electric motors producing 280 metric horsepower (210 kW; 280 shp), and one propeller shaft. She was capable of operating at depths of up to 50 metres (160 ft).

The submarine had a maximum surface speed of 9.06 knots (16.78 km/h; 10.43 mph) and a maximum submerged speed of 5.71 knots (10.57 km/h; 6.57 mph). When submerged, she could operate for 45 nautical miles (83 km; 52 mi) at 4 knots (7.4 km/h; 4.6 mph); when surfaced, she could travel 7,030 nautical miles (13,020 km; 8,090 mi) at 5 knots (9.3 km/h; 5.8 mph). UB-33 was fitted with two 50 centimetres (20 in) torpedo tubes, four torpedoes, and one 8.8 cm (3.5 in) Uk L/30 deck gun. She had a complement of twenty-one crew members and two officers and a 42-second dive time.

== Fate ==
UB-33 was mined and sunk around the Varne Bank on 11 April 1918. The wreck of UB-33 lies 77 feet (23 m) below the surface of the water. The amount of clearance between the submarine and ships' keels passing directly overhead is very small, making it a risk for the heavy cross-channel ship traffic in the area. In 2007 efforts began to lift and move the wreck to deeper waters to ensure safety for passing ships. The wreck is officially classified as a war grave and therefore it cannot be deliberately destroyed.

== Summary of raiding history ==
Date	Name	Nationality	Tonnage (Note: Tonnages are in gross register tons)	Fate
8 June 1917	Kragrö	Norway	550	Captured as prize
9 June 1917	Götha	Sweden	720	Captured as prize
13 June 1917	Gertie	Sweden	257	Captured as prize
1 January 1918	Genesse	United Kingdom	2,892	Damaged
8 February 1918	Kia Ora	United Kingdom	99	Sunk
16 February 1918	Pikepool	United Kingdom	3,683	Damaged
16 February 1918	Commander	United Kingdom	58	Sunk
17 February 1918	Northville	United Kingdom	2,472	Sunk
19 February 1918	Commandant Baratier	France	324	Sunk
20 February 1918	Snow Drop	United Kingdom	40	Sunk
21 February 1918	Idalia	United Kingdom	23	Sunk
21 February 1918	Irex	United Kingdom	16	Sunk
21 February 1918	Leonora	United Kingdom	26	Sunk
21 February 1918	Oryx	United Kingdom	38	Sunk
21 February 1918	Rosebud	United Kingdom	44	Sunk
14 March 1918	Carla	Norway	1,668	Sunk
15 March 1918	Sparkling Foam	United Kingdom	199	Sunk
8 April 1918	Nyassaland	Norway	383	Sunk

== Bibliography ==
- Bendert, Harald (2000). Die UB-Boote der Kaiserlichen Marine, 1914-1918. Einsätze, Erfolge, Schicksal (in German). Hamburg: Verlag E.S. Mittler & Sohn GmbH. ISBN 3-8132-0713-7.
- Gröner, Erich; Jung, Dieter; Maass, Martin (1991). U-boats and Mine Warfare Vessels. German Warships 1815–1945. Vol. 2. Translated by Thomas, Keith; Magowan, Rachel. London: Conway Maritime Press. ISBN 0-85177-593-4.
- Rössler, Eberhard (1979). Die deutschen U-Boote und ihre Werften: eine Bilddokumentation über den deutschen U-Bootbau; in zwei Bänden (in German). Vol. I. Munich: Bernard & Graefe. ISBN 3-7637-5213-7.
