= SM UB-57 =

German submarine during WWI (1917–18)

- UB-148 at sea, a U-boat similar to UB-57.

History

German Empire
- Name: UB-57
- Ordered: 20 May 1916
- Builder: AG Weser, Bremen
- Cost: 3,276,000 German Papiermark
- Yard number: 269
- Laid down: 13 September 1916
- Launched: 21 June 1917
- Commissioned: 30 July 1917
- Fate: Sunk 14 August 1918 at 51°56′N 02°02′E by a mine, 34 dead

General characteristics
- Class & type: Type UB III submarine
- Displacement: 516 t (508 long tons) surfaced; 646 t (636 long tons; 712 short tons) submerged
- Length: 55.85 m (183 ft 3 in) (o/a)
- Beam: 5.80 m (19 ft)
- Draught: 3.72 m (12 ft 2 in)
- Propulsion: 2 × propeller shaft; 2 × Körting four-stroke 6-cylinder diesel engines, 1,050 bhp (780 kW); 2 × Siemens-Schuckert electric motors, 780 shp (580 kW)
- Speed: 13.4 knots (24.8 km/h; 15.4 mph) surfaced; 7.8 knots (14.4 km/h; 9.0 mph) submerged
- Range: 9,020 nmi (16,710 km; 10,380 mi) at 6 knots (11 km/h; 6.9 mph) surfaced; 55 nmi (102 km; 63 mi) at 4 knots (7.4 km/h; 4.6 mph) submerged
- Test depth: 50 m (160 ft)
- Complement: 3 officers, 31 men
- Armament: 5 × 50 cm (19.7 in) torpedo tubes (4 bow, 1 stern); 10 torpedoes; 1 × 8.8 cm (3.46 in) deck gun

Service record
- Part of: Flandern I Flotilla; 20 September 1917 – 14 August 1918
- Commanders: Kptlt. Otto Steinbrinck; 3 July 1917 – 1 January 1918; Oblt.z.S. Johannes Lohs; 2 January – 14 August 1918
- Operations: 11 patrols
- Victories: 45 merchant ships sunk (112,535 GRT); 1 auxiliary warship sunk (9,500 GRT); 11 merchant ships damaged (64,265 GRT)

SM UB-57 was a German Type UB III submarine or U-boat in the German Imperial Navy (German: Kaiserliche Marine) during World War I. She was commissioned into the Flanders Flotilla of the German Imperial Navy on 30 July 1917 as SM UB-57. (Note: "SM" stands for "Seiner Majestät" (English: His Majesty's) and combined with the U for Unterseeboot would be translated as His Majesty's Submarine.)

She operated as part of the Flanders Flotilla based in Zeebrugge. UB-57 was thought to have sunk with all hands at 23:00 on 14 August 1918 at 51°56′N 02°02′E after striking a mine, but on April 14th 2025, an already marked wreck at a depth of 17 meters, just west of the Westhinder shoal, close to the border with France was formally identified as the UB-57.

== Construction ==
She was built by AG Weser, Bremen and following just under a year of construction, launched at Bremen on 21 June 1917. UB-57 was commissioned later that same year under the command of Kptlt. Otto Steinbrinck. Like all Type UB III submarines, UB-57 carried 10 torpedoes and was armed with a 8.8 cm (3.46 in) deck gun. UB-57 would carry a crew of up to 3 officer and 31 men and had a cruising range of 9,020 nautical miles (16,710 km; 10,380 mi). UB-57 had a displacement of 516 t (508 long tons) while surfaced and 646 t (636 long tons; 712 short tons) when submerged. Her engines enabled her to travel at 13.4 knots (24.8 km/h; 15.4 mph) when surfaced and 7.8 knots (14.4 km/h; 9.0 mph) when submerged.

== Summary of raiding history ==
Date	Name	Nationality	Tonnage (Note: Tonnages are in gross register tons)	Fate
7 October 1917	Alcyone	United Kingdom	116	Sunk
11 October 1917	Joshua	United Kingdom	60	Sunk
20 October 1917	Leander	Norway	2,968	Sunk
20 October 1917	Nitedal	Norway	1,714	Sunk
22 October 1917	Novillo	Denmark	2,336	Sunk
23 October 1917	Seistan	United Kingdom	4,238	Sunk
23 October 1917	Tredegar Hall	United Kingdom	3,764	Sunk
22 November 1917	Krosfond	Norway	1,707	Sunk
24 November 1917	Nyassa	United Kingdom	2,579	Sunk
27 November 1917	Almond Branch	United Kingdom	3,461	Sunk
27 November 1917	Eastfield	United Kingdom	2,145	Sunk
22 December 1917	Mabel Baird	United Kingdom	2,500	Sunk
23 December 1917	Vellore	Norway	1,672	Sunk
26 December 1917	Benito	United Kingdom	4,712	Sunk
26 December 1917	Tregenna	United Kingdom	5,772	Sunk
28 December 1917	Clara	United Kingdom	2,425	Sunk
29 December 1917	Tiro	Norway	1,442	Sunk
5 February 1918	Alamance	United States	4,455	Sunk
6 February 1918	Westmoreland	United Kingdom	9,512	Damaged
7 February 1918	Ardbeg	United Kingdom	227	Sunk
7 February 1918	Ben Rein	United Kingdom	212	Sunk
7 February 1918	Limesfield	United Kingdom	427	Sunk
12 February 1918	Eleanor	United Kingdom	1,980	Sunk
12 February 1918	Polo	United Kingdom	1,383	Sunk
14 February 1918	Carlisle Castle	United Kingdom	4,325	Sunk
14 February 1918	War Monarch	United Kingdom	7,887	Sunk
17 March 1918	Anne Yvonne	France	102	Sunk
17 March 1918	Arvor	France	52	Sunk
17 March 1918	Beata	France	102	Sunk
19 March 1918	Luxor	United Kingdom	3,571	Sunk
23 March 1918	Sequoya	United Kingdom	5,263	Damaged
29 March 1918	India	Portugal	5,990	Damaged
29 March 1918	T. R. Thompson	United Kingdom	3,538	Sunk
31 March 1918	Alcinous	United Kingdom	6,743	Damaged
31 March 1918	Excellence Pleske	United Kingdom	2,059	Sunk
29 April 1918	Australier	United Kingdom	3,687	Sunk
29 April 1918	Broderick	United Kingdom	4,321	Sunk
29 April 1918	La Somme	France	1,477	Sunk
30 April 1918	Ella Sayer	United Kingdom	2,549	Sunk
30 April 1918	Umba	United Kingdom	2,042	Sunk
1 May 1918	Canonesa	United Kingdom	6,683	Damaged
2 May 1918	Unity	United Kingdom	1,091	Sunk
22 May 1918	Red Rose	United Kingdom	423	Sunk
23 May 1918	HMS Moldavia	Royal Navy	9,500	Sunk
26 May 1918	Kyarra	United Kingdom	6,953	Sunk
27 May 1918	Joseph Simone	France	8	Sunk
27 May 1918	Petit Georges	France	10	Sunk
27 May 1918	Souvenir de Ste Marie	France	7	Sunk
30 May 1918	War Panther	United Kingdom	5,260	Damaged
31 May 1918	Galileo	United Kingdom	6,287	Damaged
30 June 1918	Wilton	United Kingdom	4,281	Damaged
2 July 1918	Royal Sceptre	United Kingdom	3,858	Damaged
2 July 1918	Shirala	United Kingdom	5,306	Sunk
6 July 1918	Huntscraft	United Kingdom	5,113	Damaged
5 August 1918	Tuscan Prince	United Kingdom	5,275	Damaged
8 August 1918	Clan Macvey	United Kingdom	5,815	Sunk
9 August 1918	Glenlee	United Kingdom	4,915	Sunk

== Bibliography ==
- Bendert, Harald (2000). Die UB-Boote der Kaiserlichen Marine, 1914-1918. Einsätze, Erfolge, Schicksal (in German). Hamburg: Verlag E.S. Mittler & Sohn GmbH. ISBN 3-8132-0713-7.
- Gröner, Erich; Jung, Dieter; Maass, Martin (1991). German Warships 1815–1945, U-boats and Mine Warfare Vessels. Vol. 2. Translated by Thomas, Keith; Magowan, Rachel. London: Conway Maritime Press. ISBN 0-85177-593-4.
- Rössler, Eberhard (1979). Die deutschen U-Boote und ihre Werften: eine Bilddokumentation über den deutschen U-Bootbau; in zwei Bänden (in German). Vol. I. Munich: Bernard & Graefe. ISBN 3-7637-5213-7.
