= SS Unity =

History
- Name: 1902–1933: SS Unity
- Operator: 1902–1905: Co-operative Wholesale Society Limited; 1905–1918: Lancashire and Yorkshire Railway
- Port of registry: (United Kingdom)
- Builder: Murdoch and Murray Port Glasgow
- Yard number: 190
- Launched: 1 November 1902
- Fate: Sunk 2 May 1918

General characteristics
- Tonnage: 1,091 GRT
- Length: 246.8 ft (75.2 m)
- Beam: 36.3 ft (11.1 m)
- Draught: 13.5 ft (4.1 m)

SS Unity was a freight vessel built for the Co-operative Wholesale Society Limited in 1902.

== History ==
Unity was built by Murdoch and Murray Port Glasgow for the Co-operative Wholesale Society and launched on 1 November 1902.

Unity was obtained in 1905 by the Lancashire and Yorkshire Railway.

Having avoided a torpedo attack which sank another vessel from the line in April 1918, Unity was torpedoed and sunk on 2 May 1918 by the Imperial German Navy submarine UB-57 in the English Channel 9 miles (14 km) southeast of Folkestone with the loss of twelve of her crew.
