= SM UB-52 =

- UB-148 at sea, a U-boat similar to UB-52.

History

German Empire
- Name: UB-52
- Ordered: 20 May 1916
- Builder: Blohm & Voss, Hamburg
- Cost: 3,276,000 German Papiermark
- Yard number: 297
- Launched: 8 March 1917
- Commissioned: 9 August 1917
- Fate: Sunk 23 May 1918

General characteristics
- Class & type: Type UB III submarine
- Displacement: 516 t (508 long tons) surfaced; 651 t (641 long tons) submerged
- Length: 55.30 m (181 ft 5 in) (o/a)
- Beam: 5.80 m (19 ft)
- Draught: 3.68 m (12 ft 1 in)
- Propulsion: 2 × propeller shaft; 2 × MAN four-stroke 6-cylinder diesel engines, 1,085 bhp (809 kW); 2 × Siemens-Schuckert electric motors, 780 shp (580 kW)
- Speed: 13.6 knots (25.2 km/h; 15.7 mph) surfaced; 8 knots (15 km/h; 9.2 mph) submerged
- Range: 9,040 nmi (16,740 km; 10,400 mi) at 6 knots (11 km/h; 6.9 mph) surfaced; 55 nmi (102 km; 63 mi) at 4 knots (7.4 km/h; 4.6 mph) submerged
- Test depth: 50 m (160 ft)
- Complement: 3 officers, 31 men
- Armament: 5 × 50 cm (19.7 in) torpedo tubes (4 bow, 1 stern); 10 torpedoes; 1 × 8.8 cm (3.46 in) deck gun

Service record
- Part of: Mittelmeer / Mittelmeer I Flotilla; 13 October 1917 – 23 May 1918
- Commanders: Oblt.z.S. Otto Launburg; 9 August 1917 – 23 May 1918
- Operations: 4 patrols
- Victories: 12 merchant ships sunk (41,411 GRT); 5 merchant ships damaged (27,076 GRT); 1 auxiliary warship damaged (227 GRT)

SM UB-52 was a German Type UB III submarine or U-boat in the German Imperial Navy (German: Kaiserliche Marine) during World War I. She was commissioned into the Pola Flotilla of the German Imperial Navy on 9 August 1917 as SM UB-52. (Note: "SM" stands for "Seiner Majestät" (English: His Majesty's) and combined with the U for Unterseeboot would be translated as His Majesty's Submarine.)

She operated as part of the Pola Flotilla based in Cattaro. UB-52 was sunk by torpedo on 23 May 1918 at 41°36′N 18°52′E by the British submarine HMS H4 enforcing the Otranto Barrage at the southern end of the Adriatic, with all hands lost.

== Construction ==
UB-52 was ordered by the GIN on 20 May 1916. She was built by Blohm & Voss, Hamburg and following just under a year of construction, launched at Hamburg on 8 March 1917. UB-52 was commissioned later that same year under the command of Oblt.z.S. Otto Launburg.

Like all Type UB III submarines, UB-52 carried 10 torpedoes and was armed with a 8.8 cm (3.46 in) deck gun. UB-52 would carry a crew of up to 3 officer and 31 men and had a cruising range of 9,040 nautical miles (16,740 km; 10,400 mi). UB-52 had a displacement of 516 t (508 long tons) while surfaced and 651 t (641 long tons) when submerged. Her engines enabled her to travel at 13.6 knots (25.2 km/h; 15.7 mph) when surfaced and 8 knots (15 km/h; 9.2 mph) when submerged.

== Summary of raiding history ==
Date	Name	Nationality	Tonnage (Note: Tonnages are in gross register tons)	Fate
30 January 1918	Empress Ekaterina II	Russian Empire	5,545	Sunk
1 February 1918	La Dives	France	2,108	Sunk
4 February 1918	Maid of Harlech	United Kingdom	315	Sunk
4 February 1918	Sardinia	United Kingdom	6,580	Damaged
5 February 1918	HMS Rosina Ferrara	Royal Navy	227	Damaged
9 February 1918	Antenor	United Kingdom	5,319	Damaged
18 February 1918	Basque	France	3,261	Damaged
20 February 1918	Balgray	United Kingdom	3,603	Sunk
20 February 1918	Zeno	United Kingdom	2,890	Sunk
17 March 1918	Ivydene	United Kingdom	3,541	Sunk
18 March 1918	John H. Barry	United Kingdom	3,083	Sunk
18 March 1918	Saldanha	United Kingdom	4,594	Sunk
4 April 1918	Sincerita	Kingdom of Italy	1,722	Sunk
2 May 1918	Flawyl	United Kingdom	3,592	Sunk
9 May 1918	Atlantique	France	6,479	Damaged
11 May 1918	Suzette Fraissinet	France	2,288	Sunk
12 May 1918	Omrah	United Kingdom	8,130	Sunk
18 May 1918	Media	United Kingdom	5,437	Damaged

== Bibliography ==
- Bendert, Harald (2000). Die UB-Boote der Kaiserlichen Marine, 1914-1918. Einsätze, Erfolge, Schicksal (in German). Hamburg: Verlag E.S. Mittler & Sohn GmbH. ISBN 3-8132-0713-7.
- Gröner, Erich; Jung, Dieter; Maass, Martin (1991). German Warships 1815–1945, U-boats and Mine Warfare Vessels. Vol. 2. Translated by Thomas, Keith; Magowan, Rachel. London: Conway Maritime Press. ISBN 0-85177-593-4.
- Rössler, Eberhard (1979). Die deutschen U-Boote und ihre Werften: eine Bilddokumentation über den deutschen U-Bootbau; in zwei Bänden (in German). Vol. I. Munich: Bernard & Graefe. ISBN 3-7637-5213-7.
