= SS Omrah =

Ocean liner of the Orient Line

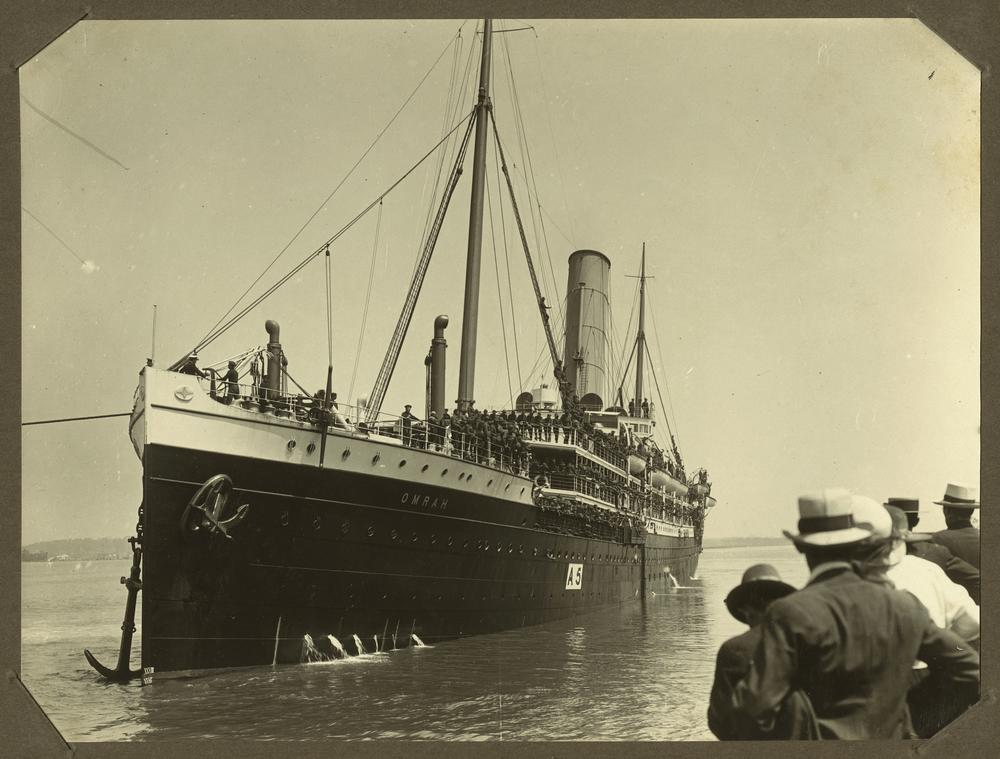
- SS Omrah

History

United Kingdom
- Name: Omrah
- Owner: Orient Steam Navigation Co Ltd
- Builder: Fairfield Shipbuilding and Engineering Company of Clydebank, Scotland
- Launched: 3 September 1898
- Completed: January 1899
- Fate: Sunk by U-boat near Sardinia

General characteristics
- Type: Steamship
- Tonnage: 8,291 tons (8,291 tonnes) displacement
- Length: 139.6 m (458 ft 0 in)
- Beam: 17.3 m (56 ft 9 in)
- Propulsion: Twin propellers

SS Omrah was an ocean liner for the Orient Steam Navigation Company built in 1899 for passenger service between the United Kingdom and Australia. During World War I, the ship was taken over for use as a troopship. On 12 May 1918, while headed from Marseille to Alexandria, Omrah was torpedoed and sunk by the German submarine UB-52 40 nautical miles (74 km; 46 mi) from Sardinia. One person aboard Omrah died in the attack.
