= SM U-152 =

German submarine from World War 1

Coordinates: 50°00′00″N 01°17′45″W

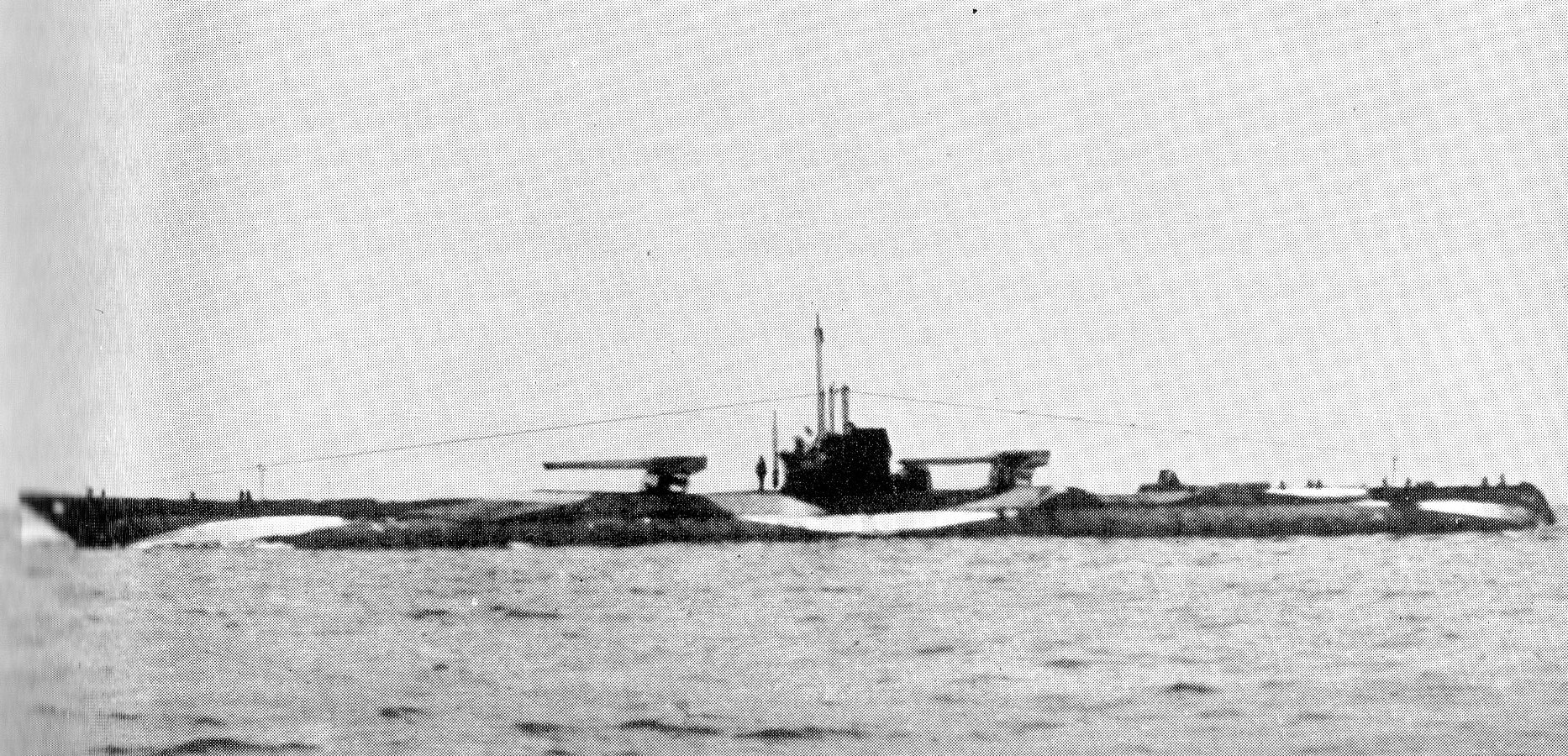
- U-152 departs at Kiel, 5 September 1918.

History

German Empire
- Name: U-152
- Ordered: 29 November 1916
- Builder: Reiherstiegwerft, Hamburg
- Launched: 20 May 1917
- Commissioned: 17 October 1917
- Fate: Surrendered, November 1918; Scuttled English Channel 30 June 1921

General characteristics
- Class & type: Type U 151 submarine
- Displacement: 1,512 tonnes (1,488 long tons) (surfaced); 1,875 tonnes (1,845 long tons) (submerged); 2,272 tonnes (2,236 long tons) (total)
- Length: 65.00 m (213 ft 3 in) (o/a); 57.00 m (187 ft) (pressure hull)
- Beam: 8.90 m (29 ft 2 in) (o/a); 5.80 m (19 ft) (pressure hull)
- Height: 9.25 m (30 ft 4 in)
- Draught: 5.30 m (17 ft 5 in)
- Installed power: 800 PS (590 kW; 790 bhp) (surfaced); 800 PS (590 kW; 790 bhp) (submerged)
- Propulsion: 2 × shafts, 2 × 1.60 m (5 ft 3 in) propellers
- Speed: 12.4 knots (23.0 km/h; 14.3 mph) surfaced; 5.2 knots (9.6 km/h; 6.0 mph) submerged
- Range: 25,000 nmi (46,000 km; 29,000 mi) at 5.5 knots (10.2 km/h; 6.3 mph) surfaced, 65 nmi (120 km; 75 mi) at 3 knots (5.6 km/h; 3.5 mph) submerged
- Test depth: 50 metres (160 ft)
- Complement: 6 officers, 50 enlisted
- Armament: 2 50 cm (20 in) bow torpedo tubes; 18 torpedoes; 2 × 15 cm (5.9 in) SK L/45 deck guns with 1672 rounds; 2 × 8.8 cm (3.5 in) Uk L/30 deck guns with 764 rounds

Service record
- Part of: U-Kreuzer Flotilla; 20 October 1917 - 11 November 1918
- Commanders: Kptlt. Constantin Kolbe; 20 October 1917 – 3 May 1918; KrvKpt. Gerhard von Zitzewitz; 4 May – 24 August 1918; Kptlt. Adolf Franz; 25 August – 15 November 1918
- Operations: 2 patrols
- Victories: 19 merchant ships sunk (37,505 GRT); 3 merchant ships damaged (11,406 GRT)

SM U-152 was a Type U 151 submarine of the Imperial German Navy during World War I.

Built at Hamburg, the submarine was commissioned in October 1917. Initially intended as a submersible merchantman for transporting critical war materiel through the British blockade, she was converted to a combat ship while under construction.

== Service history ==
U-152 was actively employed in the Atlantic during the last year of the conflict. Among her victims were two American schooners, Julia Frances (sunk on 27 January 1918) and A.E. Whyland (sunk on 13 March 1918), the Norwegian barque Stifinder (boarded and scuttled on 13 October 1918), the Spanish Giralda (sunk on 25 January 1918), and the U.S. Navy cargo ship USS Ticonderoga. The latter was sunk, after a two-hour gun battle, with heavy casualties among her crew and passengers, on 30 September 1918. The previous day, 29 September, the submarine had also fought a gun battle with the Navy oiler USS George G. Henry, but despite being badly damaged the American ship escaped.

After returning to Germany in November 1918, at the end of her final wartime cruise, U-152 was surrendered to the Allies at Harwich on 24 November 1918 in accordance with the requirements of the Armistice with Germany. She was exhibited at Tower Bridge in London in December 1918, and then laid up at Portsmouth. On 30 June 1921, she was towed out into the English Channel and scuttled.

== Summary of raiding history ==
Date	Name	Nationality	Tonnage (Note: Merchant ship tonnages are in gross register tons. Military vessels are listed by tons displacement.)	Fate
25 January 1918	Giralda	Spain	2,194	Sunk
26 January 1918	Germano	Portugal	236	Sunk
26 January 1918	Serra Do Gerez	Portugal	257	Sunk
27 January 1918	Julia Frances	United States	183	Sunk
28 January 1918	Neptuno	Portugal	321	Sunk
5 February 1918	Sebastian	Spain	2,563	Sunk
9 February 1918	Ceferino	Spain	3,647	Sunk
15 February 1918	Neguri	Spain	1,859	Sunk
16 February 1918	Mar Caspio	Spain	2,723	Sunk
24 February 1918	Gaetana Costanzo	Kingdom of Italy	1,027	Sunk
26 February 1918	Siljestad	Norway	4,298	Sunk
6 March 1918	Elector	Portugal	134	Sunk
7 March 1918	Luigi	Kingdom of Italy	3,549	Sunk
13 March 1918	A. E. Whyland	United States	130	Sunk
16 March 1918	Ellaston	United Kingdom	3,192	Sunk
31 March 1918	Indien	Denmark	4,199	Sunk
3 April 1918	Elsie Birdett	United Kingdom	118	Sunk
11 September 1918	Constance	Denmark	199	Damaged
29 September 1918	USS George G. Henry	United States Navy	6,936	Damaged
30 September 1918	USS Ticonderoga	United States Navy	5,130	Sunk
14 October 1918	Stifinder	Norway	1,745	Sunk
15 October 1918	Messina	United Kingdom	4,271	Damaged

== Gallery ==
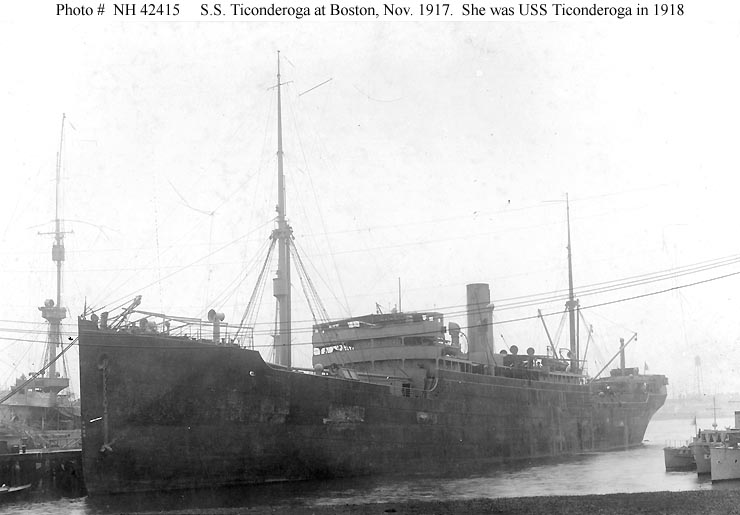
USS Ticonderoga in Boston Harbor, Massachusetts

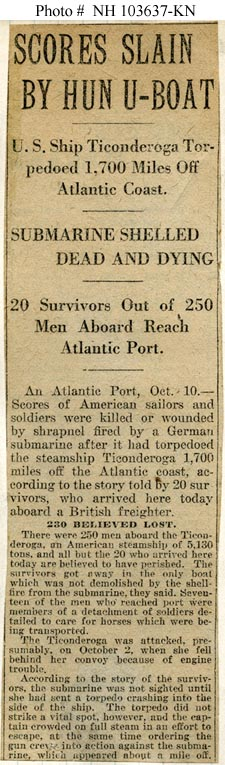
Newspaper report on the sinking of USS Ticonderoga

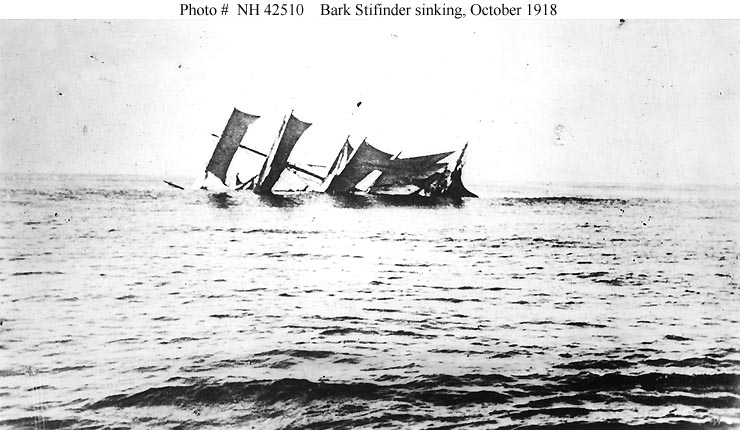
Bark Stifinder sinking

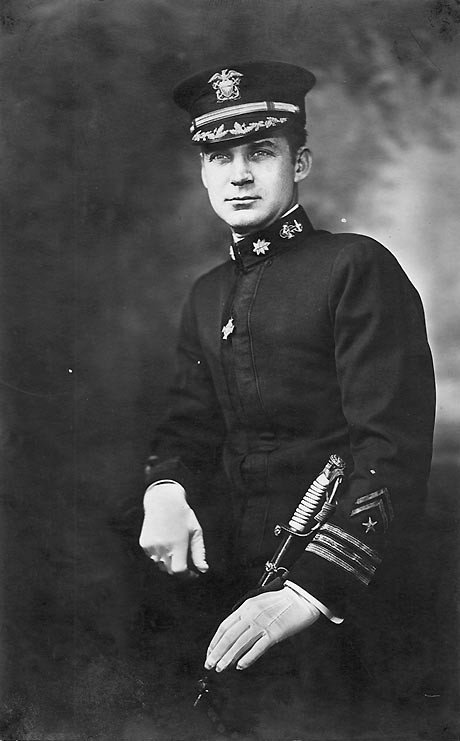
James Jonas Madison

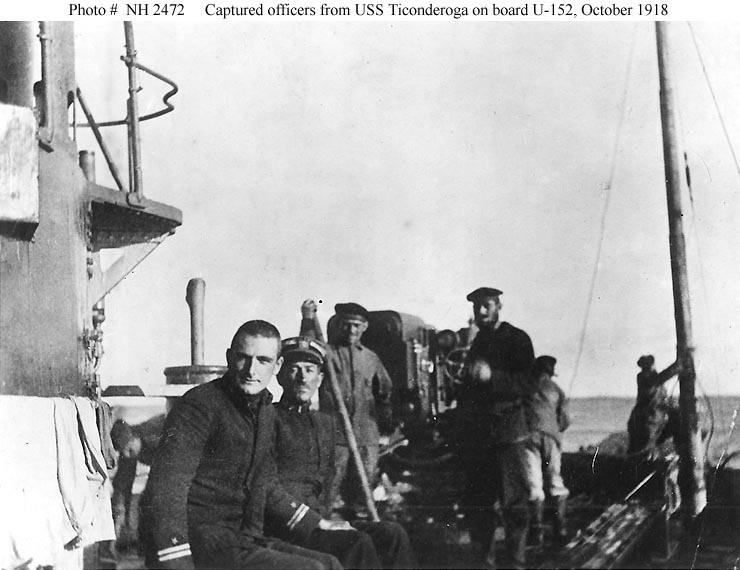
Two U.S. Navy officers captured when the submarine sank USS Ticonderoga on 30 September 1918. They are Lt. Frank L. Muller, USNRF (left), and Lt. (j.g) Junius H. Fulcher, USNRF.

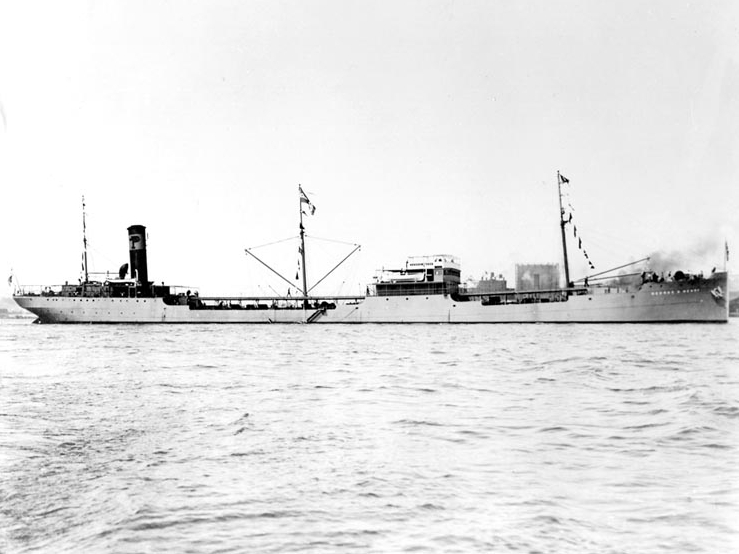
USS George G. Henry

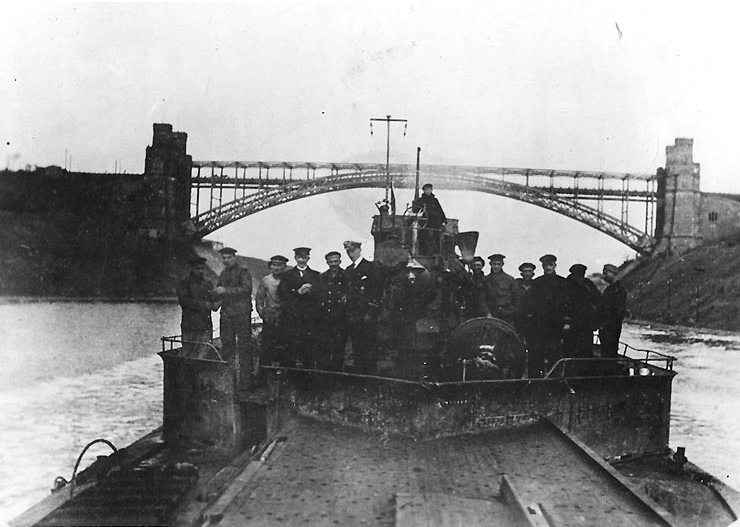
Officers, crewmen and a former prisoner of war, Lt. Frank L. Muller, USNRF, Executive Officer of USS Ticonderoga (standing third from right, wearing his uniform and a civilian cap), on the submarine's foredeck, while she was passing through the Kiel Canal on the way to Harwich, England to be surrendered, 28 November 1918.

== Bibliography ==
- Gröner, Erich; Jung, Dieter; Maass, Martin (1991). U-boats and Mine Warfare Vessels. German Warships 1815–1945. Vol. 2. Translated by Thomas, Keith; Magowan, Rachel. London: Conway Maritime Press. ISBN 0-85177-593-4.
- Bodo Herzog/Günter Schomaekers: Ritter der Tiefe – Die erfolgreichsten U-Bootkommandanten der Welt. Verlag Welsermühl, Wels und München 1976, ISBN 3-85339-136-2
- Jung, Dieter (2004). Die Schiffe der Kaiserlichen Marine 1914-1918 und ihr Verbleib [German Imperial Navy ships 1914-1918 and their fate] (in German). Bonn: Bernard & Graefe. ISBN 3-7637-6247-7.
- Paul Kemp: Die deutschen und österreichischen U-Boot Verluste in beiden Weltkriegen. Urbes Verlag Hans Jürgen Hansen, Gräfelfing vor München 1998, ISBN 3-924896-43-7
- Eberhard Möller / Werner Brack: Enzyklopädie deutscher U-Boote, Von 1904 bis zur Gegenwart, Motorbuch Verlag, ISBN 3-613-02245-1
