= Runnelstone Rock =

Rock in Grandidier Channel, Graham Land, Antarctica

Runnelstone Rock (65°47′S 65°20′W) is a rock lying at the southwest end of Grandidier Channel, 3 nautical miles (6 km) northwest of Larrouy Island and 16 nautical miles (30 km) west-southwest of Cape Garcia, Graham Land. Charted by the British Graham Land Expedition (BGLE) in 1935–36 and named after the Runnel Stone off Gwennap Head, Cornwall, England.
