= USS Arayat =

United States petroleum tanker

History

United States
- Name: USS Arayat (IX-134)
- Namesake: Arayat
- Builder: Fairfield Shipbuilding
- Launched: 17 January 1918 as SS War Patriot
- Acquired: 13 April 1944
- Commissioned: 18 April 1944
- Decommissioned: 15 February 1946
- Stricken: 12 March 1946
- Fate: Returned to War Shipping Administration, sold 1946, scrapped 1954

General characteristics
- Displacement: 12,275 tons (full)
- Length: 431 ft 1 in (131.39 m)
- Beam: 52 ft 0 in (15.85 m)
- Draft: 25 ft 8 in (7.82 m) (full)
- Speed: 9.7 knots
- Complement: 117
- Armament: 1 x 5-inch 38 caliber dual purpose gun; 5 x 40 mm guns

The USS Arayat (IX-134) was a petroleum tanker built in 1918 at Glasgow, Scotland, by Fairfield Shipbuilding, as SS Faireno. She was acquired by the United States Navy from the War Shipping Administration on 13 April 1944 at Brisbane, Australia, and commissioned there on 18 April 1944.

On 28 April, she was put to sea bound for the coast of New Guinea. She arrived at Milne Bay on 5 May where she began service as a station tanker dispensing fuel oil to units of the 7th Fleet. She remained at that port until early March 1945. On the 5th of that month, the tanker got underway for Hollandia, New Guinea, arrived in Humboldt Bay on the 13th, and began duty as station tanker there. While at Hollandia, she made periodic runs to Tanahmerah Bay to replenish her oil supply, but spent most of her time at her base refueling American warships through the end of the war and into the autumn.

Late in October 1945, she moved to Seeadler Harbor at Manus Island in the Admiralties for repairs. On 6 November, she got underway for Pearl Harbor. Arayat stopped over at Pearl Harbor from 27 November to 4 December before continuing her voyage to the United States. She transited the Panama Canal on 3 January 1946 and arrived at Mobile, Alabama, on the 14th. Arayat was decommissioned on 15 February 1946 and was delivered to the War Shipping Administration that same day for disposal. Her name was struck from the Navy list on 12 March 1946.
