= List of shipwrecks in April 1918 =

The list of shipwrecks in April 1918 includes ships sunk, foundered, grounded, or otherwise lost during April 1918.

== 1 April ==
List of shipwrecks: 1 April 1918
Ship	State	Description
Ardglass	United Kingdom	World War I: The cargo ship was torpedoed and sunk in the Irish Sea 7 nautical miles (13 km) north east of Larne, County Antrim by SM UC-31 (Imperial German Navy) with the loss of seven of her crew.
HMS Falcon	Royal Navy	The C-class destroyer collided with the trawler John Fitzgerald (United Kingdom) and sank in the North Sea off Bridlington, Yorkshire (54°07′45″N 0°22′10″E).
Lusitano	Portugal	World War I: The barquentine was scuttled in the Atlantic Ocean off the Azores (38°50′N 18°24′W) by SM U-155 (Imperial German Navy). Her crew took to the lifeboats but were not rescued.
SMS Saturn	Imperial German Navy	The Vorpostenboot was lost on this date.

== 2 April ==
List of shipwrecks: 2 April 1918
Ship	State	Description
Ashmore	Norway	During a voyage from São Vicente, Cape Verde, to Saint John, New Brunswick, Canada, the 219-foot (67 m), 1,043-gross register ton three-masted barque was wrecked in the Bay of Fundy on the Dixon Rocks off Grand Manan between Long Ledge and Yellow Ledge.
Meaford	United Kingdom	World War I: The cargo ship was sunk in the Atlantic Ocean by SM U-53 (Imperial German Navy) with the loss of all hands.
SMS Senator Sthamer	Imperial German Navy	The Vorpostenboot was lost on this date.
Solway Queen	United Kingdom	World War I: The coaster was torpedoed and sunk in the Irish Sea 7 nautical miles (13 km) off Black Head, Wigtownshire by SM U-101 (Imperial German Navy) with the loss of eleven crew.

== 3 April ==
List of shipwrecks: 3 April 1918
Ship	State	Description
AG-11	Imperial Russian Navy	World War I: The AG-class submarine was scuttled in the harbour at Hanko.
AG-12	Imperial Russian Navy	World War I: The AG-class submarine was scuttled in the harbour at Hanko.
AG-16	Imperial Russian Navy	World War I: The AG-class submarine was scuttled in the harbour at Hanko.
HMS E1	Royal Navy	World War I: The E-class submarine was scuttled in the Gulf of Finland off the Harmaja Lighthouse.
HMS E9	Royal Navy	World War I: The E-class submarine was scuttled in the Gulf of Finland off the Harmaja Lighthouse.
Elina	United States	While the 8-gross register ton motor vessel – with no crew or cargo aboard – was under tow along with two scows by the launch Chomley (United States), her bow stem pulled out and she broke free off the coast of Southeast Alaska 2 nautical miles (3.7 km; 2.3 mi) southwest of South Vallenar Point (55°25′35″N 131°51′00″W). By the time Chomley dropped off the scows and returned to Elina, Chomley was able to salvage Elina's gasoline engine, but otherwise Elina had become a total loss.
Elsie Burdett	United Kingdom	World War I: The schooner was sunk in the Atlantic Ocean off the Canary Islands, Spain (44°38′N 24°28′W) by SM U-152 (Imperial German Navy). Her six crew took to the lifeboat but were not rescued.
Sylvie	France	World War I: The cargo ship was sunk in the Mediterranean Sea 120 nautical miles (220 km) north east of Malta by SM UC-54 (Imperial German Navy).
Unknown	United States	The scow sank at the Thames Shipyard, New London, Connecticut.

== 4 April ==
List of shipwrecks: 4 April 1918
Ship	State	Description
Agatina	Italy	World War I: the barquentine was shelled and sunk in the Mediterranean Sea off Sicily by SM UC-25 (Imperial German Navy).
HMS Bittern	Royal Navy	The Avon-class destroyer collided with Kenilworth (United Kingdom) in the English Channel off the Isle of Portland, Dorset and sank with the loss of all 63 crew.
HMS C26	Royal Navy	World War I: The C-class submarine was scuttled in the Gulf of Finland off the Harmaja Lighthouse to prevent her capture by German forces.
HMS E8	Royal Navy	World War I: The E-class submarine was scuttled in the Gulf of Finland off the Harmaja Lighthouse prevent her capture by German forces.
HMT J&A	Royal Navy	The naval trawler was lost on this date.
Liberia	France	World War I: The cargo ship was sunk in the Gulf of Genoa 62 nautical miles (115 km) south east of the Îles d'Hyères (42°04′N 7°02′E) by SM UC-35 (Imperial German Navy). Her crew survived.
Orange	United States Army	The US Army Corps of Engineers pipeline dredge was destroyed by fire in a canal near the Sabine River.
Sincerita	Italy	World War I: The cargo ship was sunk in the Mediterranean Sea (36°17′N 14°48′E) by SM UB-52 (Imperial German Navy). Her crew survived.
Five unnamed vessels	Royal Navy	World War I: The submarines were scuttled in the Gulf of Finland to prevent their capture by German forces.

== 5 April ==
List of shipwrecks: 5 April 1918
Ship	State	Description
HMS C27	Royal Navy	World War I: The C-class submarine was scuttled in the Gulf of Finland off the Harmaja Lighthouse prevent her capture by German forces.
HMS C35	Royal Navy	World War I: The C-class submarine was scuttled in the Gulf of Finland off the Harmaja Lighthouse prevent her capture by German forces.
Camelia	Italy	World War I: The barque was shelled and sunk in the Mediterranean Sea off Cap Caccia (40°38′N 8°06′E) by SM UC-35 (Imperial German Navy).
Cyrene	United Kingdom	World War I: The cargo ship was torpedoed and sunk in Caernarfon Bay 15 nautical miles (28 km) north of Bardsey Island, Caernarfonshire by SM UC-31 (Imperial German Navy) with the loss of 24 of her crew.

== 6 April ==
List of shipwrecks: 6 April 1918
Ship	State	Description
Madeleine III	French Navy	World War I: The Q-ship was torpedoed and sunk in the Mediterranean Sea off the coast of Algeria (37°27′N 9°53′E) by SM UB-50 (Imperial German Navy) with the loss of seventeen of her twenty crew. The survivors were taken as prisoners of war.
Madonna delle Grazie B.	Italy	World War I: The sailing vessel was sunk in the Ionian Sea by SM UC-52 (Imperial German Navy).
Ministre de Smet de Naeyer	Belgium	World War I: The cargo ship struck a mine and sank in the North Sea 45 nautical miles (83 km) north of the Dogger Bank Lightship (United Kingdom) with the loss of twelve of her 29 crew.
HMML 421	Royal Navy	The motor launch was lost on this date.
Sterne	Netherlands	World War I: The sailing vessel was stopped in the North Sea 60 nautical miles (110 km) off Jæren, Rogaland, Norway by SM U-19 (Imperial German Navy). U-19 intended to sink her but lost sight of her. Sterne came ashore at Utsire, Rogaland and was a total loss.

== 7 April ==
List of shipwrecks: 7 April 1918
Ship	State	Description
Boscastle	United Kingdom	World War I: The collier was torpedoed and sunk in St. George's Channel 14 nautical miles (26 km) north north west of Strumble Head, Pembrokeshire by SM U-111 (Imperial German Navy) with the loss of eighteen crew.
Catriena	Netherlands	World War I: The sailing vessel was sunk in the North Sea 58 nautical miles (107 km) south west of Egersund, Rogaland, Norway (58°04′N 4°14′E) by SM UB-73 (Imperial German Navy). Her crew survived.
Highland Brigade	United Kingdom	World War I: The cargo liner was sunk in the English Channel 6 nautical miles (11 km) south by east of St. Catherine's Point (50°35′N 1°14′W) by SM UC-71 (Imperial German Navy). Her crew survived.
Port Campbell	United Kingdom	World War I: The cargo ship was torpedoed and sunk in the Atlantic Ocean 115 nautical miles (213 km) west south west of the Bishop Rock, Isles of Scilly by SM U-53 (Imperial German Navy). Her crew survived.
Rye	United Kingdom	World War I: The coaster was torpedoed and sunk in the English Channel 19 nautical miles (35 km) north west by west of Cap d'Antifer, Seine-Inférieure, France (49°57′N 0°07′W) by SM UB-74 (Imperial German Navy) with the loss of four of her crew.
Sterope	Regia Marina	World War I: The tanker was shelled and sunk in the Atlantic Ocean off the Azores, Portugal (38°44′N 18°09′W) by SM U-155 (Imperial German Navy).
Vera Cruz	United States	The sailing ship was wrecked at Tampico, Tamaulipas, Mexico.

== 8 April ==
List of shipwrecks: 8 April 1918
Ship	State	Description
Bengali	United Kingdom	World War I: The cargo ship was torpedoed and sunk in the Mediterranean Sea 14 nautical miles (26 km) off Alexandria, Egypt (31°21′N 29°47′E) by SM UC-34 (Imperial German Navy). Her crew survived.
HMS E19	Royal Navy	World War I: The E-class submarine was scuttled in the Gulf of Finland off the Harmaja Lighthouse.
Flanders	Belgium	World War I: The cargo ship struck a mine and sank in the North Sea off the coast of the Netherlands. Her crew were rescued.
Nyassaland	Norway	World War I: The coaster was sunk in the English Channel 18 nautical miles (33 km) east of Start Point, Devon, United Kingdom by SM UB-33 (Imperial German Navy). Her crew survived.
Superb	Norway	World War I: The sailing vessel was sunk in the North Sea 40 nautical miles (74 km) south of Lindesnes, Vest-Agder by SM U-90 (Imperial German Navy). Her crew survived.
Tainui	United Kingdom	World War I: The cargo ship was torpedoed damaged in the Atlantic Ocean 60 nautical miles (110 km) south west of the Isles of Scilly by SM U-82 (Imperial German Navy) and was abandoned by her crew. She was beached at Falmouth, Cornwall but was later salvaged, repaired and returned to service.

== 9 April ==
List of shipwrecks: 9 April 1918
Ship	State	Description
HMT Annie Smith	Royal Navy	The naval trawler was lost on this date.
Aveiro	Portugal	World War I: The cargo ship was sunk in the Mediterranean Sea (36°24′N 18°06′E) by SM UB-53 (Imperial German Navy). Her crew survived.
HMT Lord Hardinge	Royal Navy	The naval trawler collided with another vessel and sank in the Irish Sea off the Daunt Lightship (United Kingdom).
President Daniel E. Howard	Liberia Navy	World War I: During the German bombing of Monrovia, the 73-ton gunboat, an auxiliary sailing vessel and Liberia's only naval ship, was sunk in the Atlantic Ocean off Monrovia by SM U-154 (Imperial German Navy). The crew were either captured and paroled, and/or 26 crew were killed according to differing sources.
President Leroy-Iallier	France	World War I: The cargo ship was torpedoed and sunk in the Atlantic Ocean 15 nautical miles (28 km) north west of Ouessant, Finistère (48°50′N 5°13′W) by SM UB-109 (Imperial German Navy) with the loss of 26 of her crew.
Vasconia	Norway	World War I: The cargo ship struck a mine and sank in the Mediterranean Sea north of Alexandria, Egypt, with the loss of seven of her crew.

== 10 April ==
List of shipwrecks: 10 April 1918
Ship	State	Description
Asia	United Kingdom	The coaster foundered. Her crew were rescued by a Norwegian merchant vessel.
Barge No. 21	United States	The barge was destroyed by fire in the New Orleans, Louisiana, area.
Benedetto Cairoli	Regia Marina	The La Masa-class destroyer collided with Giacinto Carini (Regia Marina) and sank in the Ionian Sea.
Faulx	French Navy	The Bouclier-class destroyer was rammed and sunk in the Strait of Otranto by Mangini (French Navy).
Henley	United Kingdom	World War I: The cargo ship was torpedoed and sunk in the Atlantic Ocean 25 nautical miles (46 km) south west of The Lizard, Cornwall (49°35′N 5°31′W) by SM UB-109 (Imperial German Navy) with the loss of six of her crew.
USS SC-126	United States Navy	The submarine chaser grounded and partially sank near Two Rocks Passage, Bermuda Harbor; finally sank about 100 yards (91 m) south of Agar's Island. Raised, repaired, and returned to service in October.
San Sabra	United States	World War I: The passenger ship was sunk by a mine with all 30 hands 15 miles (24 km) south east of Barnegat Lighthouse, New Jersey.
Westfield	United Kingdom	World War I: The cargo ship was sunk in the Atlantic Ocean 45 nautical miles (83 km) south west by south of the Bishop Rock, Isles of Scilly (49°10′N 6°46′W) by SM U-82 (Imperial German Navy). Her crew survived.

== 11 April ==
List of shipwrecks: 11 April 1918
Ship	State	Description
Carmela G	Italy	World War I: The sailing vessel was sunk in the Mediterranean Sea west of Sicily by SM UB-50 (Imperial German Navy).
Highland Prince	United Kingdom	World War I: The cargo ship was torpedoed and sunk in the Mediterranean Sea 36 nautical miles (67 km) north east of Cape Bon, Algeria (37°27′N 11°32′E) by SM UB-50 (Imperial German Navy) with the loss of three of her crew.
HMS King Alfred	Royal Navy	World War I: The Drake-class cruiser was torpedoed and damaged in the Atlantic Ocean 30 nautical miles (56 km) north of Malin Head, County Donegal by SM UB-86 (Imperial German Navy) with the loss of a crew member.
Kingstonian	United Kingdom	World War I: The cargo ship was torpedoed and damaged in the Mediterranean Sea off San Pietro Island, Italy (39°20′N 7°10′E) by SM UB-68 (Imperial German Navy) with the loss of a crew member. She was beached in Carloforte Bay but was again torpedoed and damaged on 29 April by SM UB-48 (Imperial German Navy) and was a total loss.
USS Lakemoor	United States Navy	World War I: The cargo ship was torpedoed and sunk in the Irish Sea 2.5 nautical miles (4.6 km) off the Corsewall Lighthouse, Wigtownshire, United Kingdom by SM UB-64 (Imperial German Navy) with the loss of 46 of her crew.
USS Mary B. Garner	United States Navy	The patrol vessel ran aground at Prime Hook, Delaware and was wrecked. She was later salvaged, repaired and returned to service. One killed.
Myrtle Branch	United Kingdom	World War I: The cargo ship was torpedoed and sunk in the Atlantic Ocean 9 nautical miles (17 km) north east by north of Inishtrahull Island, County Donegal by SM UB-73 (Imperial German Navy) with the loss of fifteen of her crew.
SMS Rheinland	Imperial German Navy	The Nassau-class battleship ran aground on Laagskar Island, Åland, Sweden with the loss of two of her crew. She was refloated on 20 April and subsequently served as a barracks ship.
SM UB-33	Imperial German Navy	World War I: The Type UB II submarine struck a mine and sank in the Strait of Dover (50°55′N 1°17′E) with the loss of all 28 crew.

== 12 April ==
List of shipwrecks: 12 April 1918
Ship	State	Description
Autolycus	United Kingdom	World War I: The cargo ship was torpedoed and sunk in the Mediterranean Sea 38 nautical miles (70 km) off Cape Palos, Spain (38°01′N 0°23′E) by SM U-34 (Imperial German Navy). Her crew survived.
HM CMB-18A	Royal Navy	The Coastal Motor Boat was lost on this date.
HM CMB-33A	Royal Navy	The Coastal Motor Boat was lost on this date.
Lonhelen	United Kingdom	World War I: The cargo ship struck a mine and sank in the North Sea south west of the Shipwash Lightship (United Kingdom). Her crew survived.
Luis	United Kingdom	World War I: The cargo ship was torpedoed and sunk in the English Channel 3.5 nautical miles (6.5 km) south south east of St. Catherine's Point, Isle of Wight by SM UC-71 (Imperial German Navy) with the loss of four of her crew.
Luisa	Spain	World War I: The cargo ship was torpedoed and sunk in the Atlantic Ocean 6 nautical miles (11 km) west by south of the Pendeen Lighthouse, Cornwall, United Kingdom (50°07′N 5°49′W) by SM UB-74 (Imperial German Navy). Her crew survived.
Moyune	United Kingdom	World War I: Convoy HE 9: The cargo ship was torpedoed and sunk in the Mediterranean sea off Cape Palos (37°26′N 0°06′E) by SM U-34 (Imperial German Navy). Her crew survived.
Njaal	Russia	World War I: The barque was sunk in the North Sea off Flekkefjord by SM U-104 (Imperial German Navy).

== 13 April ==
List of shipwrecks: 13 April 1918
Ship	State	Description
City of Wilmington	United States	The steamer burned and sank in the Atlantic Ocean 250 miles (400 km) east of Halifax, Nova Scotia.
Harewood	United Kingdom	World War I: The cargo ship was shelled and sunk in the Atlantic Ocean 380 nautical miles (700 km) west by south of Lisbon, Portugal by SM U-155 (Imperial German Navy) with the loss of two of her crew.
Provence	France	World War I: The cargo ship was torpedoed and damaged in the Mediterranean Sea 1.5 nautical miles (2.8 km) off the Cape Palamos Lighthouse, Spain (41°43′N 3°09′E) by SM UB-68 (Imperial German Navy). She was beached but was later refloated, repaired and returned to service.
Ruth	United Kingdom	World War I: The fishing smack was scuttled in the North Sea by a Kaiserliche Marine submarine.
Wilson	United Kingdom	World War I: The schooner was scuttled in the Atlantic Ocean 10 nautical miles (19 km) north west of the Smalls Lighthouse by SM UB-109 (Imperial German Navy). Her crew survived.

== 14 April ==
List of shipwrecks: 14 April 1918
Ship	State	Description
Admiral Codrington	United Kingdom	and Southgare (Sweden): The two cargo ships collided in the North Sea off the coast of the East Riding of Yorkshire. Southgare sank about 6 nautical miles (11 km) off Crab Rocks, Bempton Cliffs, with the loss of 11 men; 10 were rescued. The newly built Admiral Codrington sank just south of Flamborough Head.
Chelford	United Kingdom	World War I: The cargo ship was torpedoed and sunk in the Irish Sea north west of Bardsey Island, Pembrokeshire (52°48′N 5°04′W) by SM UB-73 (Imperial German Navy). Her crew survived.
Maroc	France	World War I: The cargo ship was sunk in the Atlantic Ocean 2 nautical miles (3.7 km) off the Longships Lighthouse, Cornwall, United Kingdom by SM UB-74 (Imperial German Navy).
Marstonmoor	United Kingdom	World War I: The collier was torpedoed and sunk in the Atlantic Ocean 55 nautical miles (102 km) north north east of Cape Wrath, Sutherland (59°34′N 4°45′W) by SM U-107 (Imperial German Navy). Her crew survived.
Santa Isabel	United Kingdom	World War I: The cargo ship was shelled and sunk in the Atlantic Ocean 15 nautical miles (28 km) off the Cape Verde Islands, Portugal by SM U-153 (Imperial German Navy) with the loss of a crew member.

== 15 April ==
List of shipwrecks: 15 April 1918
Ship	State	Description
Ailsa Craig	United Kingdom	World War I: The cargo ship was sunk in the English Channel 14 nautical miles (26 km) west by north of Portland Bill, Dorset (50°30′N 2°48′W) by SM UB-80 (Imperial German Navy). Her crew survived.
Pomeranian	United Kingdom	World War I: The ship was sunk in the English Channel 9 nautical miles (17 km) off Portland Bill by SM UC-77 (Imperial German Navy) with the loss of 55 lives.
Rostov	Imperial Russian Navy	World War I: The transport ship was sunk in the Black Sea south of Sevastopol (44°34′N 34°20′E) by SM UC-23 (Imperial German Navy).

== 16 April ==
List of shipwrecks: 16 April 1918
Ship	State	Description
Florence H.	United States	The cargo ship suffered an onboard explosion and sank at anchor in Quiberon Bay, or in the port of Quiberon with the loss of 17 gunners and 24 of her 75 crew, 32 survivors, including 6 gunners, were rescued by a destroyer.
H5	Italian Royal Navy	World War I: The H-class submarine was sunk in error in the southern Adriatic Sea by a torpedo fired by the submarine HMS H1 (Royal Navy).
Hungerford	United Kingdom	World War I: The cargo ship was torpedoed and sunk in the English Channel 9 nautical miles (17 km) south south east of the Owers Lightship (50°33′N 0°35′W) by SM UC-75 (Imperial German Navy) with the loss of eight of her crew.
Ladoga	United Kingdom	World War I: The cargo ship was torpedoed and sunk in the Irish Sea 15 nautical miles (28 km) south east of the South Arklow Lightship (United Kingdom) (52°33′N 5°35′W) by SM UB-73 (Imperial German Navy) with the loss of 29 of her crew.
Lake Michigan	United Kingdom	World War I: The passenger ship was torpedoed and sunk in the Atlantic Ocean 93 nautical miles (172 km) north by west of Eagle Island, County Mayo (55°30′N 11°52′W) by SM U-100 (Imperial German Navy with the loss of a crew member.
Lodaner	United Kingdom	World War I: The cargo ship was sunk in the Irish Sea south east of the South Arklow Lightship (United Kingdom) by SM UB-73 (Imperial German Navy) with the loss of all 32 crew.
Nirpura	United Kingdom	World War I: The cargo ship was torpedoed and sunk in the Atlantic Ocean 110 nautical miles (200 km) west north west of Cabo da Roca, Portugal (38°57′N 11°55′W) by SM U-155 (Imperial German Navy). Her crew survived.
Polarine	United States	The motor boat sank off Watch Hill, Rhode Island.
Romania	Italy	World War I: The cargo ship was sunk in the Adriatic Sea off Cape Linguetta, Albania (40°24′N 19°14′E) by SM UC-22 (Imperial German Navy). Her crew survived.
HMT Select	Royal Navy	The naval trawler was lost on this date.
SMS Streiter	Austro-Hungarian Navy	World War I: The Huszár-class destroyer collided with Petka (Austria-Hungary) and sank in the Adriatic Sea off Lovran (45°00′N 14°15′E). She was escorting a convoy at the time.
Widwud	Russia	World War I: The sailing vessel was sunk in the Atlantic Ocean north west of Ireland by SM U-104 (Imperial German Navy).

== 17 April ==
List of shipwrecks: 17 April 1918
Ship	State	Description
SMS LM2	Imperial German Navy	World War I: The L1-class motor patrol boat was destroyed by a fire or explosion.
SM UB-82	Imperial German Navy	World War I: The Type UB III submarine was depth charged and sunk in the Irish Sea (55°13′N 5°55′W) by two Royal Navy trawlers with the loss of all 32 crew.

== 18 April ==
List of shipwrecks: 18 April 1918
Ship	State	Description
Bamse	United Kingdom	World War I: The coaster was torpedoed and sunk in the English Channel 15 nautical miles (28 km) west by north of Portland Bill, Dorset by SM UB-80 (Imperial German Navy) with the loss of four of her crew.
Claus Groth	Imperial German Navy	World War I: The Greta-class Vorpostenboot was sunk by mines off Cape Tachkuna, Estonia.
Dalegarth Force	United Kingdom	World War I: The cargo ship was torpedoed and sunk in the English Channel 12 nautical miles (22 km) south west of Hartland Point, Devon (50°51′N 4°42′W) by SM UB-73 (Imperial German Navy) with the loss of five crew.
Gregynog	United Kingdom	World War I: The collier was torpedoed and sunk in the English Channel 16 nautical miles (30 km) south west of Hartland Point (50°47′N 4°44′W) by SM UB-86 (Imperial German Navy) with the loss of three of her crew.
Pentyrch	United Kingdom	World War I: The cargo ship was torpedoed and sunk in the English Channel 5 nautical miles (9.3 km) west north west of the Brighton Lightship (United Kingdom) by SM UB-40 (Imperial German Navy) with the loss of a crew member.
Runswick	United Kingdom	World War I: The cargo ship was torpedoed and damaged in the Atlantic Ocean 3 nautical miles (5.6 km) north of Trevose Head, Cornwall (50°33′N 5°03′W) by SM UB-109 (Imperial German Navy). She was beached but was declared a total loss. Her crew survived.

== 19 April ==
List of shipwrecks: 19 April 1918
Ship	State	Description
Alice Taylor	United Kingdom	The coaster foundered on this date. Her crew were rescued.
Elka	Greece	World War I: Convoy GaG16: The cargo ship was torpedoed and sunk in the Mediterranean Sea 50 nautical miles (93 km) off Cape Gati, Spain, by SM U-34 (Imperial German Navy). Her crew survived.
Lord Charlemont	United Kingdom	World War I: The cargo ship was torpedoed and sunk in the Mediterranean Sea 22 nautical miles (41 km) north of the Isla de Alborán, Morocco (36°15′N 3°04′W) by SM U-34 (Imperial German Navy) with the loss of eight crew.
Salambo	French Navy	World War I: The naval trawler was torpedoed and sunk in the Ionian Sea (38°30′N 18°06′E) by SM U-38 (Imperial German Navy). Her crew survived.
SM UB-78	Imperial German Navy	World War I: The Type UB III submarine struck a mine and sank in the Strait of Dover (51°01′N 1°17′E) with the loss of all 35 crew.
War Helmet	United Kingdom	World War I: The cargo ship was torpedoed and sunk in the English Channel 3 nautical miles (5.6 km) east by north of the Owers Lightship (United Kingdom) by SM UC-75 (Imperial German Navy). Her crew survived.

== 20 April ==
List of shipwrecks: 20 April 1918
Ship	State	Description
Florrieston	United Kingdom	World War I: The cargo ship was torpedoed and sunk in the Irish Sea 6 nautical miles (11 km) east of South Stack, Anglesey by SM U-91 (Imperial German Navy) with the loss of nineteen of her crew.
Lowther Range	United Kingdom	World War I: The cargo ship was torpedoed and sunk in the Irish Sea 20 nautical miles (37 km) west by north of South Stack (53°18′N 5°10′W) by SM U-104 (Imperial German Navy). Her crew survived.
SMS M39	Imperial German Navy	World War I: The Type 1915 minesweeper struck a mine and sank in the North Sea.
SMS M64	Imperial German Navy	World War I: The Type 1916 minesweeper struck a mine and sank in the North Sea.
SMS M95	Imperial German Navy	World War I: The Type 1916 minesweeper struck a mine and sank in the North Sea.
HMT Numitor	Royal Navy	World War I: The naval trawler struck a mine and sank in the North Sea off Orfordness, Suffolk (52°07′N 1°45′E) with the loss of five of her crew.

== 21 April ==
List of shipwrecks: 21 April 1918
Ship	State	Description
Bellview	United Kingdom	World War I: The collier was torpedoed and sunk in the Mediterranean Sea 16 nautical miles (30 km) east north east of Cape Bon, Tunisia (37°13′N 11°21′E) by SM U-32 (Imperial German Navy). Her crew survived.
Delta A	Belgium	World War I: The trawler was stopped and sunk in the Atlantic Ocean 18 nautical miles (33 km) south of St. Kilda, Inverness-shire, United Kingdom by SM U-19 (Imperial German Navy).
SMS Emma Oetken	Imperial German Navy	The Vorpostenboot was lost on this date.
Landonia	United Kingdom	World War I: The cargo ship was torpedoed and sunk in the Irish Sea 27 nautical miles (50 km) north west by west of Strumble Head, Pembrokeshire by SM U-91 (Imperial German Navy) with the loss of 21 of her crew. One of the survivors was taken as a prisoner of war.
Normandiet	United Kingdom	World War I: The cargo ship was torpedoed and sunk in the Irish Sea 34 nautical miles (63 km) south west by west of the Calf of Man, Isle of Man by SM U-91 (Imperial German Navy) with the loss of nineteen of her crew.
SM UB-71	Imperial German Navy	World War I: The Type UB III submarine was depth charged and sunk in the Strait of Gibraltar (35°38′N 5°18′W) by HMML 413 (Royal Navy) with the loss of all 32 crew.
Westergate	United Kingdom	World War I: The cargo ship was torpedoed and sunk in the English Channel 22 nautical miles (41 km) east of Start Point, Devon by SM UB-80 (Imperial German Navy) with the loss of 24 of her crew.

== 22 April ==
List of shipwrecks: 22 April 1918
Ship	State	Description
Baron Herries	Royal Navy	World War I: The naval tug was torpedoed and sunk in the Atlantic Ocean 43 nautical miles (80 km) north by west of the Bishop Rock, Isles of Scilly (50°27′N 7°06′W) by SM U-91 (Imperial German Navy) with the loss of three of her crew. One of the survivors was taken as a prisoner of war.
Dronning Maud	United Kingdom	World War I: The collier was torpedoed and sunk in the Mediterranean Sea 65 nautical miles (120 km) north north east of Cape Sigli, Algeria (38°00′N 4°56′E) by SM U-34 (Imperial German Navy) with the loss of a crew member.
Eric Calvert	United Kingdom	World War I: The collier was torpedoed and sunk in the Atlantic Ocean 4 nautical miles (7.4 km) south south west of St Anthony Head, Cornwall 50°04′30″N 5°01′45″W) by SM UB-103 (Imperial German Navy) with the loss of two of her crew.
USS Fenimore	United States Navy	The cargo ship was destroyed by fire in New York Harbor.
Fern	United Kingdom	World War I: The cargo ship was torpedoed and sunk in the Irish Sea 5 nautical miles (9.3 km) east of the Kish Lightship (United Kingdom) by SM U-104 (Imperial German Navy) with the loss of thirteen crew.
Kheda Moulekar	France	World War I: The sailing vessel was sunk in the Mediterranean Sea (32°08′N 32°50′E) by SM UB-53 (Imperial German Navy).
Marshalla	United Kingdom	World War I: The sailing vessel was sunk by shellfire in the Mediterranean Sea 50 nautical miles (93 km) north of Port Said, Egypt (32°11′N 32°39′E) by SM UB-53 (Imperial German Navy).
Prinz August Wilhelm	Germany	The Hamburg America Line steamship was burned and scuttled in Puerto Colombia to prevent the United States Shipping Board from seizing her.
HMT Pursuit	Royal Navy	The naval trawler was lost on this date.
Sadika	France	World War I: The sailing vessel was sunk in the Mediterranean Sea (32°13′N 32°40′E) by SM UB-53 (Imperial German Navy).
SM UB-55	Imperial German Navy	World War I: The Type UB III submarine struck a mine and sank in the Strait of Dover (51°01′N 1°20′E) with the loss of 23 of her 29 crew.
Welbeck Hall	United Kingdom	World War I: The ship was torpedoed and sunk in the Mediterranean Sea 75 nautical miles (139 km) north east by north of Port Said by SM UB-53 (Imperial German Navy) with the loss of four of her crew.

== 23 April ==
List of shipwrecks: 23 April 1918
Ship	State	Description
HMS Brilliant	Royal Navy	World War I: First Ostend Raid: The Apollo-class cruiser was scuttled as a blockship at Ostend, West Flanders, Belgium.
HMS C3	Royal Navy	World War I: Zeebrugge Raid: Packed with explosives, the C-class submarine was rammed into the a viaduct connecting the mole to the shore at Zeebrugge, West Flanders, Belgium, and detonated in order to destroy the viaduct.
Frances	United Kingdom	World War I: The ketch was scuttled in the Atlantic Ocean (46°33′N 12°05′W) by SM U-155 (Imperial German Navy) with the loss of two of her crew.
HMS Intrepid	Royal Navy	World War I: Zeebrugge Raid: The destroyer was scuttled at Zeebrugge in an attempt to block the entrance to the Bruges Canal.
HMS Iphigenia	Royal Navy	World War I: Zeebrugge Raid: The destroyer was scuttled at Zeebrugge in an attempt to block the entrance to the Bruges Canal.
Laurium	United Kingdom	World War I: The coaster struck a mine and sank in the North Sea off the Inner Dowsing Lightship (United Kingdom) with the loss of a crew member.
HMML 110	Royal Navy	The motor launch was lost on this date.
HMML 424	Royal Navy	The motor launch was lost on this date.
HMS North Star	Royal Navy	World War I: Zeebrugge Raid: The Admiralty M-class destroyer was shelled and sunk at Zeebrugge by German shore-based artillery.
Peregrine	United Kingdom	World War I: The trawler was shelled and sunk in Yell Sound by SM U-19 (Imperial German Navy). Her crew survived.
HMT Plethos	Royal Navy	World War I: The naval trawler struck a mine and sank in the North Sea 40 nautical miles (74 km) east north east of Montrose, Forfarshire with the loss of four of her crew.
Restaurado	Portugal	World War I: The sailing vessel was sunk in the Atlantic Ocean off the coast of Portugal by SM UB-105 (Imperial German Navy).
HMS Sirius	Royal Navy	World War I: First Ostend Raid: The Apollo-class cruiser was scuttled as a blockship at Ostend.
HMS Thetis	Royal Navy	World War I: Zeebrugge Raid: The Apollo-class cruiser was scuttled at Zeebrugge in an attempt to block the entrance to the Bruges Canal.
Tyne Wave	United Kingdom	World War I: The trawler was shelled and sunk in the North Sea 16 nautical miles (30 km) north east of Ronas Voe, Shetland Islands by SM U-19 (Imperial German Navy). Her crew survived.

== 24 April ==
List of shipwrecks: 24 April 1918
Ship	State	Description
Agnete	United Kingdom	World War I: The cargo ship was torpedoed and sunk in the English Channel 4 nautical miles (7.4 km) south by west of Start Point, Devon by a Kaiserliche Marine submarine with the loss of twelve of her crew.
Leonor	Portugal	World War I: The trawler was scuttled in the Atlantic Ocean off the coast of Portugal by SM UB-105 (Imperial German Navy).
Mabrouska	France	World War I: The sailing vessel was sunk in the Mediterranean Sea (32°44′N 32°40′E) by SM UB-53 (Imperial German Navy).

== 25 April ==
List of shipwrecks: 25 April 1918
Ship	State	Description
HMS Cowslip	Royal Navy	World War I: The Anchusa-class sloop was sunk in the Atlantic Ocean off Cape Spartel, Morocco by SM UB-105 (Imperial German Navy) with the loss of six of her 93 crew.
Joseph	France	World War I: The sailing vessel was sunk in the English Channel off Cherbourg, Seine-Inférieure by SM UB-31 (Imperial German Navy).
Sevilla	Norway	World War I: The cargo ship was sunk in the English Channel 3 nautical miles (5.6 km) north west of Berry Head, Devon, United Kingdom (50°24′N 3°23′W) by SM UB-80 (Imperial German Navy) with the loss of a crew member.
Sote	Sweden	World War I: The cargo ship was torpedoed and sunk in the North Sea off Flamborough Head, East Riding of Yorkshire, United Kingdom by SM UC-64 (Imperial German Navy) with the loss of a crew member.
HMS St. Seiriol	Royal Navy	World War I: The auxiliary minesweeper struck a mine and sank in the North Sea off the Shipwash Lightship (United Kingdom) with the loss of twelve of her crew.
SM U-104	Imperial German Navy	World War I: The Type U 57 submarine was depth charged and sunk in St. George's Channel (51°59′N 6°26′W) by USS Cushing (United States Navy) and HMS Jessamine (Royal Navy) with the loss of 41 of her 42 crew.
HMS Willow Branch	Royal Navy	World War I: The Q-ship was sunk in the Atlantic Ocean off Cabo Blanco, Mauritania (21°00′N 17°56′W) by SM U-153 and SM U-154 (both Imperial German Navy) with the loss of 58 of her crew.
HM Torpedo Boat 90	Royal Navy	The torpedo boat capsized and sank off Gibraltar.

== 26 April ==
List of shipwrecks: 26 April 1918
Ship	State	Description
Angelina di Paola	Italy	World War I: The brig was sunk in the Mediterranean Sea north of Cape San Vito, Sicily by SM UB-68 (Imperial German Navy).
Ethel	United Kingdom	World War I: The schooner was shelled and sunk in the Irish Sea 19 nautical miles (35 km) north by east of the Smalls Lighthouse by SM U-91 (Imperial German Navy). Her crew survived.
USS G-3	United States Navy	The G-class submarine ran aground on Eel Grass Shoal near Fishers Island, New York. Refloated and returned to service
Leopold d'Or	France	World War I: The cargo ship was torpedoed and sunk in the Tyrrhenian Sea off San Pietro Island, Italy (39°55′N 7°02′E) by SM UB-48 (Imperial German Navy).
Llyngwair	United Kingdom	World War I: The collier was torpedoed and sunk in the North Sea 5 nautical miles (9.3 km) south south east of Seaham Harbour, County Durham by SM UC-64 (Imperial German Navy) with the loss of eight of her crew.
Westerly	United States	The steamer was sunk in a collision with Lucidina (United Kingdom) off Brest, France.

== 27 April ==
List of shipwrecks: 27 April 1918
Ship	State	Description
Azizeh	France	World War I: The sailing vessel was sunk in the Mediterranean Sea (32°07′N 32°32′E) by SM UB-53 (Imperial German Navy).
Gresham	United Kingdom	World War I: The cargo ship was torpedoed and sunk in the Irish Sea 18 nautical miles (33 km) north west by north of Strumble Head, Pembrokeshire (52°14′N 5°05′W) by SM U-91 (Imperial German Navy). Her crew survived.
Nemaat Kheda	France	World War I: The sailing vessel was sunk in the Mediterranean Sea (32°07′N 32°32′E) by SM UB-53 (Imperial German Navy). Her crew survived.
Romany	United Kingdom	World War I: The tanker was torpedoed and sunk in the Mediterranean Sea 47 nautical miles (87 km) west south west of Cape Spartivento, Italy, by SM UB-48 (Imperial German Navy). Her crew survived.
Walpas	Russia	World War I: The sailing vessel was sunk in the Irish Sea 15 nautical miles (28 km) west by north of Bardsey Island, Pembrokeshire by SM U-91 (Imperial German Navy).

== 28 April ==
List of shipwrecks: 28 April 1918
Ship	State	Description
HM CMB-39B	Royal Navy	The Coastal Motor Boat was lost on this date.
Damao	Portugal	World War I: The cargo ship was sunk in St. George's Channel 12 nautical miles (22 km) west of Bardsey Island, Pembrokeshire, United Kingdom by SM U-91 (Imperial German Navy).
Elba	United Kingdom	World War I: The cargo ship was torpedoed and sunk in the Atlantic Ocean 6 nautical miles (11 km) north west of the Pendeen Lighthouse (50°13′N 5°48′W) by SM UB-103 (Imperial German Navy) with the loss of ten of her crew.
HMT Emley	Royal Navy	World War I: The naval trawler was sunk in the Firth of Forth south of the Isle of May, Fife by SM UC-40 (Imperial German Navy) with the loss of eight of her crew.
Kingstonian	United Kingdom	World War I: the cargo ship was torpedoed and sunk in Carloforte Bay by SM UB-48 (Imperial German Navy) with the loss of a crew member.
Moose	United Kingdom	World War I: The tug was torpedoed and sunk in Carloforte Bay by SM UB-48 (Imperial German Navy).
Oronsa	United Kingdom	World War I: The passenger ship was torpedoed and sunk in St. George's Channel 12 nautical miles (22 km) west of Bardsey Island by SM U-91 (Imperial German Navy) with the loss of three of her crew.
Poitiers	France	World War I: The cargo ship was sunk in the Atlantic Ocean 4 nautical miles (7.4 km) south west of Hartland Point, Devon, United Kingdom by SM U-60 (Imperial German Navy).
Rimfakse	Norway	World War I: The cargo ship was torpedoed and sunk in the Atlantic Ocean 10 nautical miles (19 km) south west of Hartland Point (50°54′N 4°35′W) by SM U-60 (Imperial German Navy). Her crew survived.
USS Saint Paul	United States Navy	The ocean liner turned on her side and sank at her pier at West Twenty-second Street, New York City, New York while undergoing conversion to a troop transport. Later refloated, but the conversion was halted, and the vessel returned to her owners after the war ended, unrepaired. Two people were killed.
Upcerne	United Kingdom	World War I: The cargo ship was torpedoed and sunk in the North Sea 4 nautical miles (7.4 km) south east by east of Coquet Island, Northumberland by SM UC-40 (Imperial German Navy) with the loss of sixteen of her crew.
Verdun	France	World War I: The cargo ship was sunk in the Gulf of Gabès 37 nautical miles (69 km) east of Kerkennah, Tunisia (34°49′N 11°52′E) by SM UC-20 (Imperial German Navy).

== 29 April ==
List of shipwrecks: 29 April 1918
Ship	State	Description
Australier	United Kingdom	World War I: The cargo ship was torpedoed and sunk in the English Channel 6 nautical miles (11 km) south west by south of Dungeness, Kent (50°52′N 0°58′E) by SM UB-57 (Imperial German Navy) with the loss of five of her crew.
Broderick	United Kingdom	World War I: The cargo ship was torpedoed and sunk in the English Channel 7 nautical miles (13 km) south south east of Hastings, Sussex by SM UB-57 (Imperial German Navy). Her crew survived.
Christiana Davis	United Kingdom	World War I: The schooner was shelled and sunk in the Atlantic Ocean 8 nautical miles (15 km) south east by south of the Tuskar Rock, Ireland by SM U-105 (Imperial German Navy). Her crew survived.
City of Pensacola	United States	World War I: The auxiliary four-masted schooner was sunk in the Mediterranean Sea off Garrucha, Almería, Spain (38°58′N 4°21′E) by SM UB-105 (Imperial German Navy). Her crew survived.
HMS Dalkeith	Royal Navy	World War I: The naval tug was sunk in the Mediterranean Sea off San Pietro Island, Italy, by SM UB-48 (Imperial German Navy) with the loss of nine of her crew.
Ellis Sayer	United Kingdom	The collier was lost on this date.
Frogner	Norway	World War I: The cargo ship was sunk in the English Channel 3 nautical miles (5.6 km) off Portland Bill, Dorset, United Kingdom by SM UC-17 (Imperial German Navy). Her crew survived.
Johnny Toole	United Kingdom	World War I: The ketch was shelled and sunk in the Atlantic Ocean 3 nautical miles (5.6 km) south of the Tuskar Rock by SM U-105 (Imperial German Navy). Her crew survived.
Kut Sang	United Kingdom	World War I: The cargo ship was torpedoed and sunk in the Mediterranean Sea 40 nautical miles (74 km) east south east of Cape Palos, Spain, by SM UB-105 (Imperial German Navy) with the loss of 59 of her crew.
La Somme	France	World War I: The cargo ship was sunk in the English Channel 5 nautical miles (9.3 km) west south west of Dungeness (50°52′N 0°51′E) by SM UB-57 (Imperial German Navy) with the loss of a crew member.
Maria	Greece	World War I: The vessel was sunk in the Mediterranean Sea (35°38′N 13°20′E) by SM U-27 (Austro-Hungarian Navy). Her crew survived.
Prairial	French Navy	The Pluviose-class submarine collided with the steamer Tropic (United Kingdom) in the English Channel off Le Havre, Seine Maritime, France, and sank with the loss of nineteen of her 26 crew.
Saint Chamond	France	World War I: The cargo ship was torpedoed and sunk in the Atlantic Ocean 14 nautical miles (26 km) north of St. Ives Head, Cornwall, United Kingdom (50°15′N 5°30′W) by SM U-60 (Imperial German Navy). Her crew survived.

== 30 April ==
List of shipwrecks: 30 April 1918
Ship	State	Description
Conway	United Kingdom	World War I: The cargo ship was torpedoed and sunk in the Mediterranean Sea 38 nautical miles (70 km) south of Cape Palos, Murcia, Spain (37°10′N 0°28′W) by SM UB-105 (Imperial German Navy). Her crew survived.
Ella Sayer	United Kingdom	World War I: The cargo ship was torpedoed and sunk in the English Channel 15 nautical miles (28 km) east by north of the Royal Sovereign Lightship (50°49′N 0°48′E) by SM UB-57 (Imperial German Navy) with the loss of two of her crew.
Gnevny	Imperial Russian Navy	The Bespokoynyy-class destroyer was shelled and damaged by German artillery off Usakov Bulk near Sevastopol and beached, she was scuttled by her crew. Salvaged by the Germans in the Summer of 1918 and commissioned as R03 (Imperial German Navy).
Isleworth	United Kingdom	World War I: The cargo ship was torpedoed and sunk in the English Channel 3 nautical miles (5.6 km) south west of Ventnor, Isle of Wight by SM UC-17 (Imperial German Navy) with the loss of 29 of her crew.
Kafue	United Kingdom	World War I: The cargo ship was torpedoed and sunk in the Irish Sea 11 nautical miles (20 km) south west of the Mull of Galloway, Wigtownshire by SM U-86 (Imperial German Navy) with the loss of a crew member.
Kalliope	United Kingdom	World War I: The sailing vessel was sunk in the Mediterranean Sea 45 nautical miles (83 km) off Alexandria, Egypt, by SM UC-74 (Imperial German Navy).
Kempock	United Kingdom	World War I: The coaster was shelled and sunk in the Irish Sea 6.5 nautical miles (12.0 km) south east by south of the Copeland Islands by SM U-86 (Imperial German Navy). Her crew survived.
SM UB-85	Imperial German Navy	World War I: The Type UB III submarine foundered in the Irish Sea off Belfast, County Antrim, United Kingdom. All 34 crew were rescued by HMS Coreopsis (Royal Navy).
Umba	United Kingdom	World War I: The cargo ship was torpedoed and sunk in the English Channel 1 nautical mile (1.9 km) south of the Royal Sovereign Lightship (United Kingdom) by SM UB-57 (Imperial German Navy) with the loss of twenty of her crew.

== Unknown date ==
List of shipwrecks: Unknown date 1918
Ship	State	Description
Cicero	United Kingdom	World War I: The cargo ship was scuttled in the Baltic Sea to avoid capture by the Germans.
Emilie	United Kingdom	World War I: The cargo ship was scuttled in the Baltic Sea to avoid capture by the Germans.
Michelet	France	World War I: The barque was sunk in the Atlantic Ocean off the west coast of Africa on or about 25 April by SM U-154 (Imperial German Navy) with the loss of all 28 crew.
Obsidian	United Kingdom	World War I: The cargo ship was scuttled in the Baltic Sea to avoid capture by the Germans.
Prarial	French Navy	The submarine collided with a merchant vessel and sank with some loss of life.
SM UC-79	Imperial German Navy	World War I: The Type UC II submarine struck a mine and sank in the English Channel off Cap Gris Nez, Pas-de-Calais, France during the first week of April with the loss of all 30 crew.
