= SS Rye =

SS Rye is the name of the following ships:

- SS Rye (1914), sunk 7 April 1918 by SM UB-74
- SS Rye (1924), sunk 3 July 1941

== See also ==
- Rye (disambiguation)
