= German submarine U-85 =

U-85 may refer to one of the following German submarines:

- SM U-85, a Type U 81 submarine launched in 1916 and that served in the First World War until sunk on 12 March 1917
  - During the First World War, Germany also had this submarine with a similar name:
    - SM UB-85, a Type UB III submarine launched in 1917 and sunk on 30 April 1918. In a similar way to the SM U-28 sinking the British steamship Iberian, there were reports allegedly of a sea monster appearing as the U-boat sunk.
- German submarine U-85 (1941), a Type VIIB submarine that served in the Second World War until sunk on 14 April 1942
