= SS Oronsa (1906) =

1906 British passenger ship

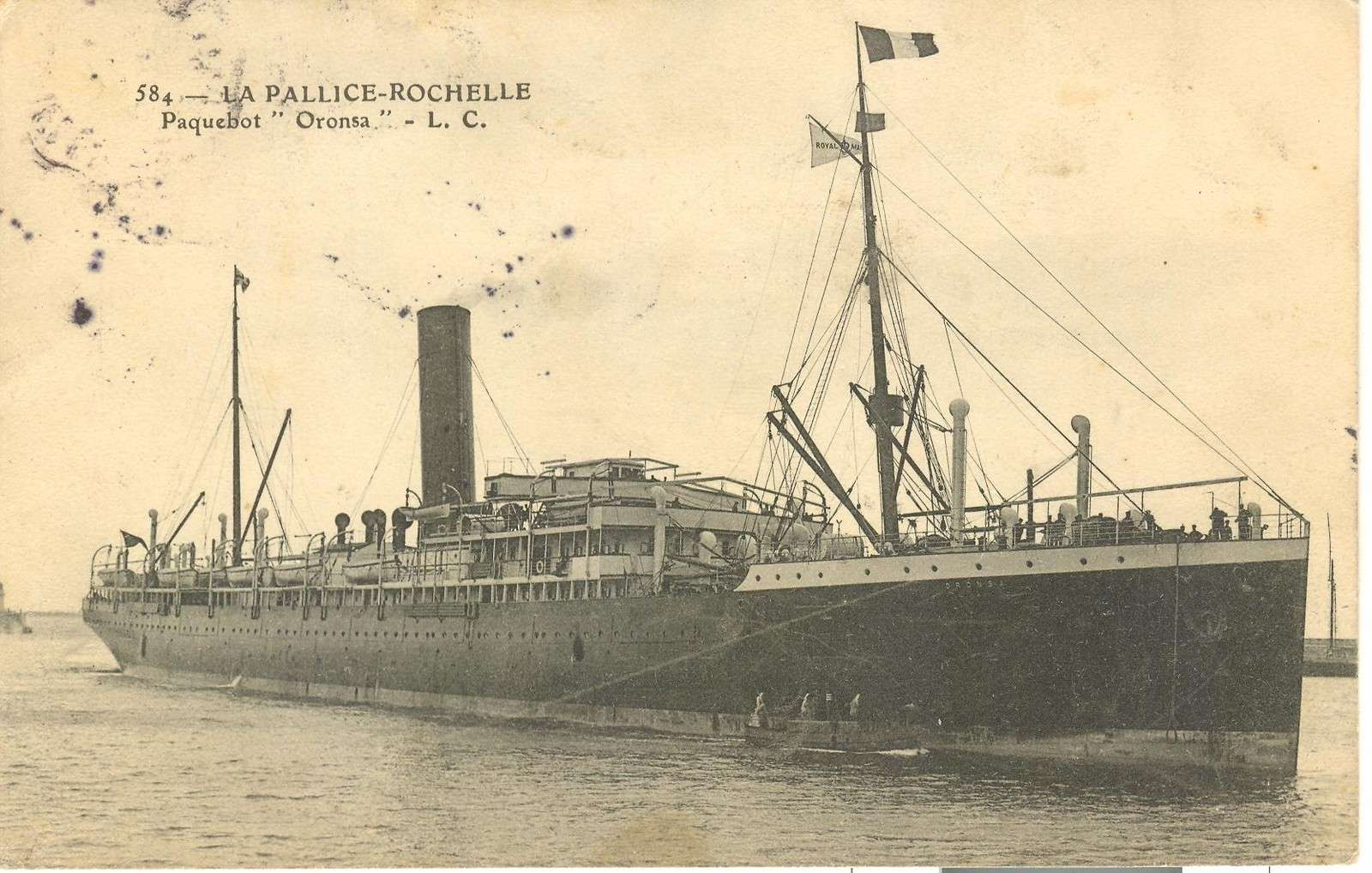

History
- Name: (United Kingdom of Great Britain and Ireland) Oronsa
- Owner: Pacific Steam Navigation Company
- Port of registry: (United Kingdom of Great Britain and Ireland) Liverpool, United Kingdom
- Builder: Harland & Wolff
- Yard number: 377
- Launched: 26 May 1906
- Completed: 16 August 1906
- Acquired: 16 August 1906
- Maiden voyage: 13 September 1906
- In service: 13 September 1906
- Out of service: 28 April 1918
- Identification: Official number: 123986; Call sign: HGTK
- Fate: Torpedoed and sunk on 28 April 1918

General characteristics
- Type: Passenger ship
- Tonnage: 8,075 GRT
- Length: 141.8 metres (465 ft 3 in)
- Beam: 17.2 metres (56 ft 5 in)
- Depth: 10.9 metres (35 ft 9 in)
- Decks: 3
- Installed power: Two 8 Cyl. Quadruple expansion engine
- Propulsion: Two screws
- Speed: 15.5 knots
- Capacity: Accommodation for 1,080 passengers (150 in First class, 130 in Second class & 800 in Steerage)
- Notes: Two masts and a single funnel

SS Oronsa was a British Passenger ship that was torpedoed by the German submarine U-91 and sank with the loss of three lives on 28 April 1918 in St. George's Channel 12 nautical miles (22 km) west of Bardsey Island, while she was travelling from Talcahuano, Chile to Liverpool, United Kingdom via New York, United States while carrying general cargo.

== Construction ==
Oronsa was built as the sistership of Ortega at the Harland & Wolff shipyard in Belfast, United Kingdom and was launched on 26 May 1906 and completed on 16 August 1906. The ship was 141.8 metres (465 ft 3 in) long, had a beam of 17.2 metres (56 ft 5 in) and a depth of 10.9 metres (35 ft 9 in). She was assessed at 8,075 GRT and had two 8 Cyl. Quadruple expansion engine driving two screw propellers that could achieve a speed of 15.5 knots. The ship had accommodation for 1,080 passengers including 150 in First class, 130 in Second class & 800 in Steerage.

== Career & Loss ==
Oronsa entered service on 13 September 1906 for the Liverpool to Pernambuco, Montevideo and Valparaíso route for the Pacific Steam Navigation Company. She remained in service during World War I and was returning to Liverpool from New York as part of a convoy of 13 ships under the command of Captain Frederick Holt Hobson, when on the night of 28 April 1918, Oronsa was struck by a torpedo from the German submarine U-91 in St. George's Channel 12 nautical miles (22 km) west of Bardsey Island. The torpedo struck Oronsa on her starboard side between cargo holds No. 3 and No. 4. and sank the ship in 10 minutes as her boilers exploded, killing three crewmen.

== Wreck ==
Oronsa lies in 90 metres (295 ft 3 in) of water and a possible sonar scan of the wreck was made in 2021, but the wreck's identity has yet to be verified.
