= F. S. Bell =

Royal Navy officer (1897-1973)

Captain F. S. Bell CB
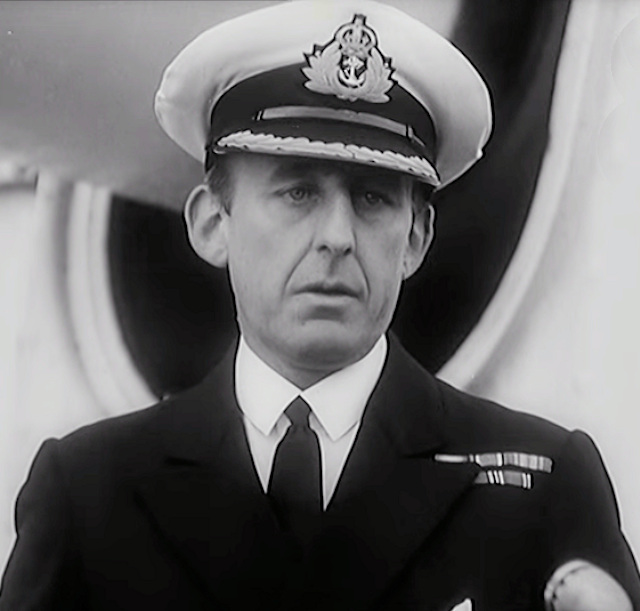
- Frederick Secker Bell, Royal Navy, Captain of HMS Exeter during the Battle of the River Platte
- Born: 17 August 1897
- Died: 23 November 1973 (aged 76)
- Military career
- Allegiance: United Kingdom
- Branch: Royal Navy
- Service years: c. 1913-1948
- Rank: Captain
- Nickname: Hookie Bell
- Commands: HMS Exeter; HMS Anson
- Conflicts: World War I; Battle of Jutland (1916); World War II; Battle of the River Plate (1939)
- Awards: Companion of the Bath

Frederick Secker Bell CB (17 August 1897 – 23 November 1973) of the Royal Navy was the commander of HMS Exeter during the Battle of the River Plate in December 1939.

== Early life and education ==
Bell was born on 17 August 1897 in London, England. He was educated at Matfield Grange, a prep school in Kent. From the age of 13, as a junior officer cadet, he was educated at the Royal Naval College, Osborne. He then went on to the Royal Naval College, Dartmouth to complete his officer training.

== Naval career ==
Bell served as a midshipman on HMS Cumberland and HMS Challenger in the Kamerun Campaign of 1914 to 1915. He served afloat in the battleship HMS Canada at the Battle of Jutland in 1916. By 1918, he was second in command of the submarine HMS D6. It was torpedoed and sunk by UB-73 in June 1918, and Bell was one of only two survivors. He spent the rest of the First World War as a prisoner of war of the Germans.

He served as first lieutenant of the destroyer HMS Scythe in the Reserve Fleet at HMNB Devonport from 1923 to 1925, and as executive officer of HMS Repulse from 1935 to 1938. He was promoted captain on 31 December 1938.

He took command of HMS Exeter in August 1939. Exeter's six eight-inch guns were mainly responsible for seriously damaging the Admiral Graf Spee in the Battle of the River Plate in December 1939. In this battle, Exeter also incurred severe damage from seven hits by eleven-inch shells and suffered 61 killed and 23 wounded. One salvo from the Graf Spee did a great deal of damage to the wheelhouse and killed all but three of the officers in it. Bell survived with minor injuries and he ordered that the remaining turrets should continue firing on the enemy. As damage control parties battled fires and flooding, Bell used a compass from one of the lifeboats, and commanded the ship by means of commands passed along a chain of men to the lower steering compartment where a team of men struggled with a wheel that was directly connected to the rudder. After all Exeter's guns had been put out of action but still seaworthy, Bell planned to collide with the enemy, saying "I'm going to ram the --------. It will be the end of us but it will sink him too". However the Admiral Graf Spee turned to confront the other two cruisers and Bell was ordered to withdraw for repairs at the Falkland Islands.

The captain, eight officers and 79 members of the crew were given the Freedom of the City of Exeter on 29 February 1940, and were welcomed by a crowd of 50,000 cheering residents. The crew marched through the streets with fixed bayonets, carrying HMS Exeter's shell-torn White Ensign through the streets. Bell was replaced as captain of Exeter on 12 April 1940 and the following year became Flag Captain to the Flag Officer, Malaya, escaping the Fall of Singapore the following year and becoming captain of HMS Anson in 1946 and aide-de-camp to the King in 1947. He retired from the Navy owing to ill health on 8 January 1948.

== In popular culture ==
In the 1956 film The Battle of the River Plate, Bell was played by John Gregson. During the film, Bell's nickname of 'Hookie', because of his distinctive nose, is used. Bell is listed as a "Naval advisor" in the opening credits of the movie and met Gregson at the film's premiere.
