= SM U-104 =

History

German Empire
- Name: U-104
- Ordered: 15 September 1915
- Builder: AG Weser, Bremen
- Yard number: 255
- Laid down: 4 August 1916
- Launched: 3 July 1917
- Commissioned: 12 August 1917
- Fate: Depth charged and sunk 25 April 1918

General characteristics
- Class & type: German Type U 57 submarine
- Displacement: 750 t (740 long tons) surfaced; 952 t (937 long tons) submerged
- Length: 67.60 m (221 ft 9 in) (o/a); 54.02 m (177 ft 3 in) (pressure hull)
- Beam: 6.32 m (20 ft 9 in) (o/a); 4.05 m (13 ft 3 in) (pressure hull)
- Height: 8.25 m (27 ft 1 in)
- Draught: 3.65 m (12 ft)
- Installed power: 2 × 2,400 PS (1,765 kW; 2,367 shp) surfaced; 2 × 1,200 PS (883 kW; 1,184 shp) submerged
- Propulsion: 2 shafts, 2 × 1.65 m (5 ft 5 in) propellers
- Speed: 16.5 knots (30.6 km/h; 19.0 mph) surfaced; 8.8 knots (16.3 km/h; 10.1 mph) submerged
- Range: 10,100 nmi (18,700 km; 11,600 mi) at 8 knots (15 km/h; 9.2 mph) surfaced; 56 nmi (104 km; 64 mi) at 5 knots (9.3 km/h; 5.8 mph) submerged
- Test depth: 50 m (164 ft 1 in)
- Complement: 4 officers, 32 enlisted
- Armament: 4 × 50 cm (19.7 in) torpedo tubes (two bow, two stern); 10–12 torpedoes; 2 × 8.8 cm (3.5 in) SK L/30 deck gun

Service record
- Part of: II Flotilla; 1 October 1917 – 25 April 1918
- Commanders: Kptlt. Kurt Bernis; 1 October 1917 – 25 April 1918
- Operations: 4 patrols
- Victories: 9 merchant ships sunk (14,721 GRT)

SM U-104 (Note: "SM" stands for "Seiner Majestät" (English: His Majesty's) and combined with the U for Unterseeboot would be translated as His Majesty's Submarine.) was a German Type U 57 U-boat during the First World War. U-104 was built at AG Weser in Bremen, launched on 3 July 1917 and commissioned on 12 August 1917. She completed four patrols under Kptlt. Kurt Bernis and was responsible for the sinking of nine vessels of a total of 14,721 gross register tons (GRT).

== Loss ==
On 25 April 1918 the U-104 was engaged by USS Cushing in St. George's Channel and severely damaged. Later the same day HMS Jessamine came upon her and dropped further depth-charges, sinking her and leaving but a single survivor of her 42-member crew. The wreckage lies at position 51°59′N 6°26′W.

== Summary of raiding history ==
Date	Name	Nationality	Tonnage (Note: Tonnages are in gross register tons)	Fate
26 October 1917	Sapele	United Kingdom	4,366	Sunk
15 December 1917	Maidag	Norway	1,253	Sunk
21 December 1917	Spro	Norway	1,507	Sunk
25 December 1917	Ajax	Denmark	1,018	Sunk
2 March 1918	Kenmare	United Kingdom	1,330	Sunk
12 April 1918	Njaal	Russian Empire	578	Sunk
16 April 1918	Widwud	Russian Empire	299	Sunk
20 April 1918	Lowther Range	United Kingdom	3,926	Sunk
22 April 1918	Fern	United Kingdom	444	Sunk

== See also ==
- U-boat Campaign (World War I)

== Bibliography ==
- Gröner, Erich; Jung, Dieter; Maass, Martin (1991). U-boats and Mine Warfare Vessels. German Warships 1815–1945. Vol. 2. Translated by Thomas, Keith; Magowan, Rachel. London: Conway Maritime Press. ISBN 0-85177-593-4.
