= SM UB-53 =

- UB-148 at sea, a U-boat similar to UB-53.

History

German Empire
- Name: UB-53
- Ordered: 20 May 1916
- Builder: Blohm & Voss, Hamburg
- Cost: 3,276,000 German Papiermark
- Yard number: 298
- Launched: 9 March 1917
- Commissioned: 21 August 1917
- Fate: Sunk 3 August 1918 at 39°40′N 18°40′E by mines, 10 dead

General characteristics
- Class & type: Type UB III submarine
- Displacement: 516 t (508 long tons) surfaced; 651 t (641 long tons) submerged
- Length: 55.30 m (181 ft 5 in) (o/a)
- Beam: 5.80 m (19 ft)
- Draught: 3.68 m (12 ft 1 in)
- Propulsion: 2 × propeller shaft; 2 × MAN four-stroke 6-cylinder diesel engines, 1,085 bhp (809 kW); 2 × Siemens-Schuckert electric motors, 780 shp (580 kW)
- Speed: 13.6 knots (25.2 km/h; 15.7 mph) surfaced; 8 knots (15 km/h; 9.2 mph) submerged
- Range: 9,040 nmi (16,740 km; 10,400 mi) at 6 knots (11 km/h; 6.9 mph) surfaced; 55 nmi (102 km; 63 mi) at 4 knots (7.4 km/h; 4.6 mph) submerged
- Test depth: 50 m (160 ft)
- Complement: 3 officers, 31 men
- Armament: 5 × 50 cm (19.7 in) torpedo tubes (4 bow, 1 stern); 10 torpedoes; 1 × 8.8 cm (3.46 in) deck gun

Service record
- Part of: Mittelmeer / Mittelmeer I Flotilla; 1 November 1917 – 3 August 1918
- Commanders: Oblt.z.S. / Kptlt. Robert Sprenger; 21 August 1917 – 3 August 1918
- Operations: 5 patrols
- Victories: 14 merchant ships sunk (16,549 GRT)

SM UB-53 was a German Type UB III submarine or U-boat in the Imperial German Navy (German: Kaiserliche Marine) during World War I. She was commissioned into the Pola Flotilla of the German Imperial Navy on 21 August 1917 as SM UB-53. (Note: "SM" stands for "Seiner Majestät" (English: His Majesty's) and combined with the U for Unterseeboot would be translated as His Majesty's Submarine.)

She operated as part of the Pola Flotilla based in Cattaro. UB-53 was sunk by mines of the Otranto Barrage on 3 August 1918 at 39°40′N 18°40′E in the Otranto Strait, 10 crew members died.SS Athenia (1914). On 7 April 1918 the submarine saw an airship catch fire accidentally and crash into the sea near the Strait of Otranto with the loss of all hands. It apparently was the German Navy Zeppelin L 59, modified for long-range flights, on the outbound leg of a flight from Yambol, Bulgaria, in an attempt to bomb the Royal Navy base at Malta.

== Construction ==
UB-53 was ordered by the GIN on 20 May 1916. She was built by Blohm & Voss, Hamburg and following just under a year of construction, launched at Hamburg on 9 March 1917. UB-53 was commissioned later that same year under the command of Kptlt. Robert Sprenger. Like all Type UB III submarines, UB-53 carried 10 torpedoes and was armed with a 8.8 cm (3.46 in) deck gun. UB-53 would carry a crew of up to 3 officer and 31 men and had a cruising range of 9,040 nautical miles (16,740 km; 10,400 mi). UB-53 had a displacement of 516 t (508 long tons) while surfaced and 651 t (641 long tons) when submerged. Her engines enabled her to travel at 13.6 knots (25.2 km/h; 15.7 mph) when surfaced and 8 knots (15 km/h; 9.2 mph) when submerged.

== Summary of raiding history ==
Date	Name	Nationality	Tonnage (Note: Tonnages are in gross register tons)	Fate
17 December 1917	Nina	Greece	126	Sunk
31 December 1917	Lily	Greece	2,993	Sunk
20 February 1918	Taxiarchis	Greece	292	Sunk
26 February 1918	Saida	France	45	Sunk
2 March 1918	Euxeinos	Greece	2,891	Sunk
6 March 1918	Kalgan	United Kingdom	1,862	Sunk
9 April 1918	Aveiro	Portugal	2,209	Sunk
22 April 1918	Kheda Moulekar	France	40	Sunk
22 April 1918	Marshalla	United Kingdom	77	Sunk
22 April 1918	Sadika	France	45	Sunk
22 April 1918	Welbeck Hall	United Kingdom	5,643	Sunk
24 April 1918	Mabrouska	France	256	Sunk
27 April 1918	Azizeh	France	30	Sunk
27 April 1918	Nemaat Kheda	France	40	Sunk

== Bibliography ==
- Bendert, Harald (2000). Die UB-Boote der Kaiserlichen Marine, 1914-1918. Einsätze, Erfolge, Schicksal (in German). Hamburg: Verlag E.S. Mittler & Sohn GmbH. ISBN 3-8132-0713-7.
- Gröner, Erich; Jung, Dieter; Maass, Martin (1991). U-boats and Mine Warfare Vessels. German Warships 1815–1945. Vol. 2. Translated by Thomas, Keith; Magowan, Rachel. London: Conway Maritime Press. ISBN 0-85177-593-4.
- Rössler, Eberhard (1979). Die deutschen U-Boote und ihre Werften: eine Bilddokumentation über den deutschen U-Bootbau; in zwei Bänden (in German). Vol. I. Munich: Bernard & Graefe. ISBN 3-7637-5213-7.
