= Type U 63 submarine =

German World War I submarine class

Class overview
- Builders: Germaniawerft, Kiel
- Operators: Imperial German Navy
- Preceded by: Type U 57
- Completed: 3
- Lost: 2

General characteristics
- Displacement: 810 t (800 long tons) surfaced; 927 t (912 long tons) submerged
- Length: 68.36 m (224 ft 3 in) (o/a); 55.55 m (182 ft 3 in) (pressure hull)
- Beam: 6.30 m (20 ft 8 in) (oa); 4.15 m (13 ft 7 in) (pressure hull)
- Height: 7.65 m (25 ft 1 in)
- Draught: 4.04 m (13 ft 3 in)
- Installed power: 2 × 2,200 PS (1,618 kW; 2,170 shp) surfaced; 2 × 1,200 PS (883 kW; 1,184 shp) submerged
- Propulsion: 2 shafts
- Speed: 16.5 knots (30.6 km/h; 19.0 mph) surfaced; 9 knots (17 km/h; 10 mph) submerged
- Range: 9,170 nmi (16,980 km; 10,550 mi) at 8 knots (15 km/h; 9.2 mph) surfaced; 60 nmi (110 km; 69 mi) at 5 knots (9.3 km/h; 5.8 mph) submerged
- Test depth: 50 m (164 ft 1 in)
- Complement: 36
- Armament: 4 × 50 cm (19.7 in) torpedo tubes (two bow, two stern); 8 torpedoes; 2 × 8.8 cm (3.5 in) SK L/30 deck gun

The Type U 63 was a class of U-boats built during World War I by the Kaiserliche Marine. Three Type U 63 submarines were ordered at the beginning of the war and these were commissioned in 1916. Two were lost during the war and the remaining one surrendered to the Allies and was scrapped.

The three Type U 63 U-boats were ordered from Germaniawerft in March 1915 as an alternative for the six cancelled Type UF U-boats. The Type UF U-boat was a single-hull large U-boat designed to be built quickly before the anticipated end of the war in 1915. But as AG Weser delivered U-57 - U-59 five months earlier than planned, and building time for the Type U 63 was reduced to less than eleven months, the Type UF was not needed anymore. The construction could be reduced by using diesel engines from a cancelled Russian order, and by simplifying the construction which involved installing less diving tanks. These were also the first Germaniawerft-built U-boats without the typical step with tank decks, instead the upper deck was incorporated completely in the second, outer hull.

== Characteristics ==
Type U 63s had an overall length of 68.36 m (224 ft 3 in) The boats' beam was 6.30 m (20 ft 8 in), the draught was 4.04 m (13 ft 3 in), with a total height of 7.65 m (25 ft 1 in). The pressure hull had a length of 55.55 m (182 ft 3 in) and had a diameter of 4.15 m (13 ft 7 in). The boats displaced 810 tonnes (800 long tons) when surfaced and 927 t (912 long tons) when submerged.

Type U 51s were fitted with two six-cylinder two-stroke Germaniawerft diesel engines with a total of 2,200 metric horsepower (1,618 kW; 2,170 bhp) for use on the surface and two Siemens-Schuckert double-acting electric motors with a total of 880 kW (1,196 PS; 1,180 shp) for underwater use. These engines powered two shafts, which gave the boats a top surface speed of 16.5 knots (30.6 km/h; 19.0 mph), and 9 knots (17 km/h; 10 mph) when submerged. Cruising range was 9,170 nautical miles (16,980 km; 10,550 mi) at 8 knots (15 km/h; 9.2 mph) on the surface and 60 nautical miles (110 km; 69 mi) at 5 knots (9.3 km/h; 5.8 mph) submerged. Constructional diving depth (Note: Constructional diving depth had a safety factor of 2.5, which meant that crushing depth was 2.5 times construction diving depth.) was 50 m (164 ft 1 in).

The U-boats were armed with four 50 cm (20 in) torpedo tubes, two fitted in the bow and two in the stern, and carried eight torpedoes. Most boats received initially two 8.8 cm (3.5 in) SK L/30 deck guns. Some boats had one of the deck guns replaced with a 10.5 cm (4.1 in) SK L/45 gun. The boats' complement was four officers and thirty-two enlisted men.

== Ships ==
Name	Launched	Commissioned	Merchant ships sunk (nbr / GRT )	Fate
U-63	8 February 1916	11 March 1916	70 / 194.208	Surrendered on 19 January 1919 and scrapped in Blyth in 1919
U-64	29 February 1916	15 April 1916	45 / 123.146	Lost on 17 June 1918 sout-east of Sardinia
U-65	21 March 1916	11 May 1916	48 / 77.715	Scuttled on 28 October 1918 off Pola

== Bibliography ==
- Gröner, Erich; Jung, Dieter; Maass, Martin (1991). German Warships 1815–1945, U-boats and Mine Warfare Vessels. Vol. 2. Translated by Thomas, Keith; Magowan, Rachel. London: Conway Maritime Press. ISBN 0-85177-593-4.
- Herzog, Bodo (1993). Deutsche U-Boote : 1906 - 1966 [German U-boats : 1906 - 1966] (in German). Erlangen: Müller. ISBN 9783860700365.
- Möller, Eberhard; Brack, Werner (2004). The Encyclopedia of U-Boats. London: Chatham. ISBN 1-85367-623-3.
- Rössler, Eberhard (1981). The U-boat: The evolution and technical history of German submarines. London: Cassell & Co. ISBN 0-304-36120-8.
