= LZ 104 (L 59) =

World War I German airship

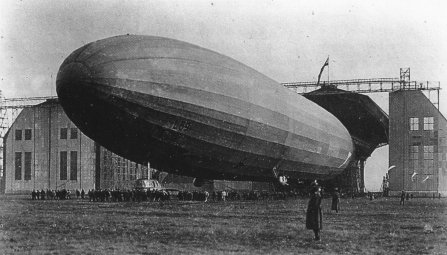

General information
- Type: Transport airship, later refitted for bombing
- National origin: Germany
- Manufacturer: Luftschiffbau Zeppelin at Staaken
- Primary user: Imperial German Navy

History
- First flight: 30 October 1917

Zeppelin LZ 104 (construction number, designated L 59 by the German Imperial Navy) and nicknamed Das Afrika-Schiff ("The Africa Ship"), was a World War I German dirigible. It is famous for having attempted a long-distance resupply mission to the beleaguered garrison of Germany's East Africa colony.

== History ==
=== Africa flight ===
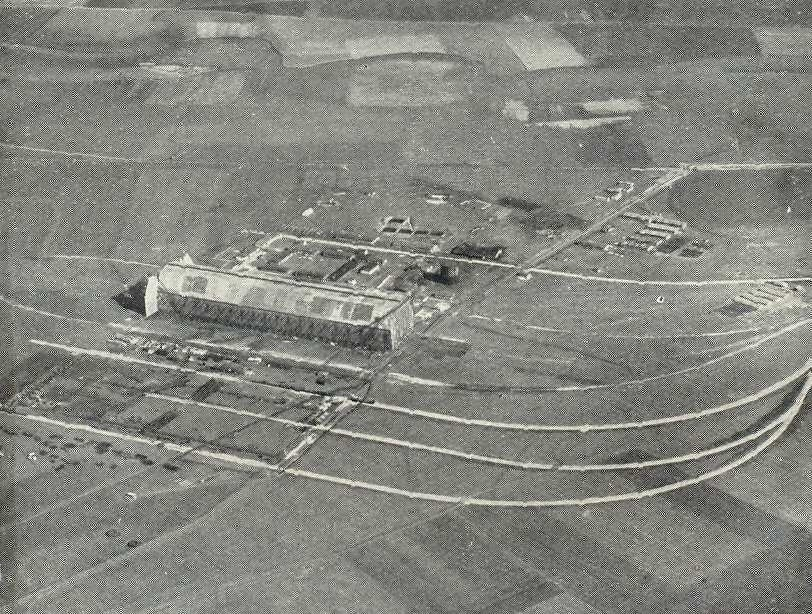
The airship hangar by Yambol, Bulgaria

Route of the African flight

The L 59 was a naval airship ordered to prepare for the resupply of Generalmajor Paul von Lettow-Vorbeck’s troops.

On 4 November 1917, after a 29-hour flight from Friedrichshafen under the command of Hugo Eckener, the airship arrived at Yambol in Bulgaria (spelled 'Jambol' in German sources), the last available airbase before flying over two thousand miles across the Mediterranean and Entente-held Africa. At Yambol Kapitänleutnant [Lieutenant Commander] Ludwig Bockholt, a regular German naval officer, met the zeppelin. He would be commander for the mission, code named China-Sache, loosely translated as "China Show" or "China Matter."

It would be impossible to resupply the airship with hydrogen gas upon its arrival in Africa, and it was decided that no return trip would be made. Instead, it was planned that every part of the ship be cannibalized for use by Lettow-Vorbeck's bush army. The outer envelope would be used for tents, muslin linings would become bandages, the duralumin framework would be used for wireless towers, and so on. In addition to its own structure, L 59 carried 13,930 kg (30,710 lb) of supplies, consisting of: 311,900 rounds of loose ammuniton, 57,500 rounds of machine gun ammunition in 230 belts, 13,500 rounds of machine gun ammunition in 54 boxes, 30 MG08/15 machine guns, 9 spare MG08/15 barrels, 4 Gewehr 98 rifles with 5,000 rounds of ammunition, 61 sacks of medical supplies and bandages, 3 sacks of sewing equipment, mail, awards, telescopes, replacement locks, bush knives, and belts.

L 59's two initial attempts at starting the journey were foiled by weather in the Mediterranean. Its third departure on 21 November 1917 was successful. The ship made good time over Adrianople, the Sea of Marmara and the coast of Asia Minor. Due to electrical storms over Crete, its wireless aerial was wound in and so the airship failed to receive messages from the German admiralty. It crossed the African coast at 05:15 on 22 November 1917 near Mersa Matruh and, flying via the Dakhla Oasis, set a dog-leg course up the Nile.

That afternoon, an engine malfunctioned when a reduction gear housing cracked; the loss of this engine eliminated the prospect of radio transmission, although wireless messages could be received. The next morning it nearly crashed when heat turbulence from the dunes below and subsequent cooling reduced the buoyancy of its gas. The crew also suffered from headaches, hallucinations and general fatigue in the mid-day heat and freezing cold at night.

Despite these difficulties, L 59 continued on over Sudan, only to be turned back on 23 November 1917, with the ship 201 kilometres (125 mi) due west of Khartoum when she received an "abort" message. L 59's volunteer crew implored the commander to continue, but he ordered the ship to turn back and returned to Bulgaria after averting another potential disaster due to loss of buoyancy over Asia Minor. It returned to base the morning of 25 November 1917, having traveled over 6,800 kilometres (4,200 mi) in 95 hours, or nearly four days in the air. When it entered its shed at Yambol, the Zeppelin had enough fuel remaining for another 64 hours flight.

It was later claimed by Richard Meinertzhagen, the chief of British intelligence in the area based at Cairo, that the recall message reporting that Lettow-Vorbeck had surrendered was faked. The British, having broken the German naval wireless code, were aware of the flight and mission. East Africa's Royal Flying Corps (RFC) squadrons were alerted to watch for the approach of the ship. What turned the airship back were two intercepted Allied intelligence reports noting that Lettow and the Schutztruppe had advanced into Portuguese Mozambique and no longer had a foothold in German East Africa.

With no hope of a place to land safely and with every likelihood of it being destroyed or falling into enemy hands, the German command had no choice but to order a return. The recall signal was sent from the Admiralty station at Nauen. Despite its failure, "the adventure of L 59 was heroic both in scale and spirit." A transcript of the radio message can be found in German archives, as well as a Turko-German wireless intercept (marked 'Secret') preserved in the files of the British Public Records office.

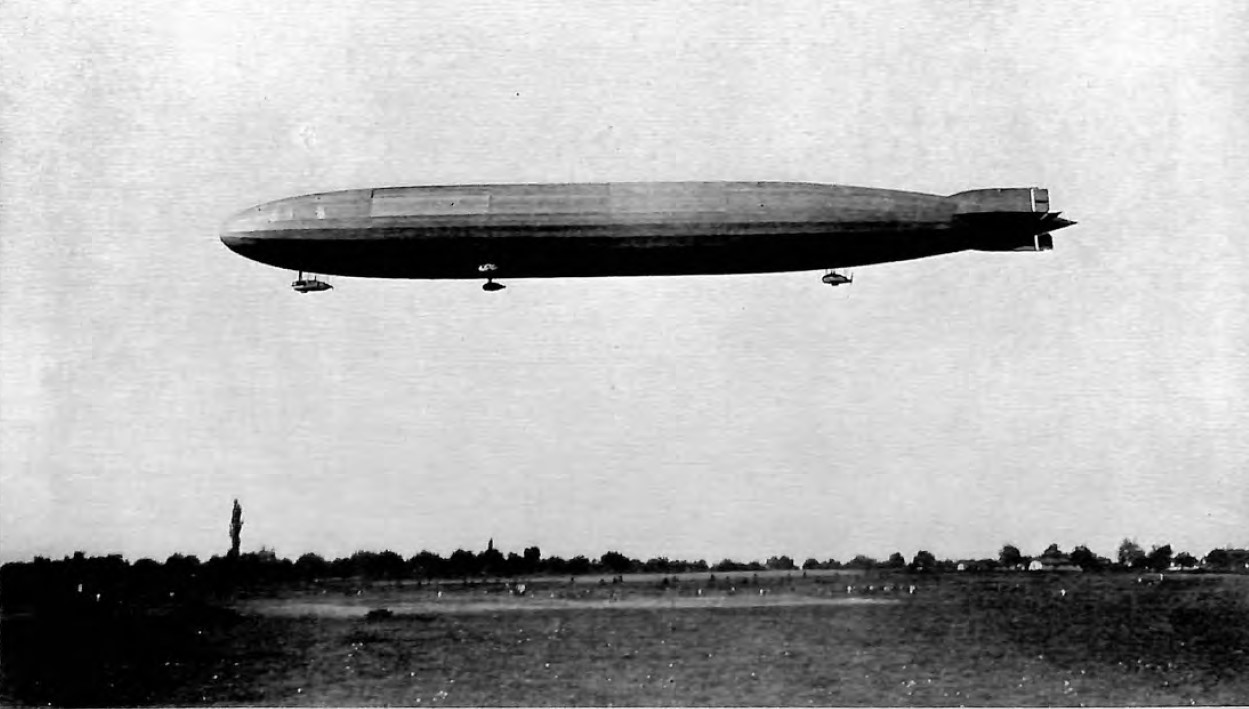
LZ-104 in flight

=== Final fate ===
Since the airship was not expected to return from her African mission, no plans for any further missions had been made. Another African flight was out of the question, so the ship was then offered for flights to supply the Ottoman army of Enver Pasha in Arabia, or to search for mines off Constantinople, but nothing came of these proposals. After several reconnaissance flights and bombing missions, L 59 took off from Yambol to attack the British naval base at Malta, proceeding across the Balkans to the Strait of Otranto.

On the evening of 7 April 1918 the surfaced German submarine UB-53 observed the airship approaching from astern. Her commanding officer, Oberleutnant zur See Robert Sprenger, reported that he watched her fly past at about 210 m (700 ft), so "close in fact that the details of the gondola could be seen clearly." A few minutes later, Sprenger noted two bursts in the air, and shortly afterwards "a gigantic flame enveloped the airship and it nosed down into the water." The airship's destruction was not claimed by either the British or the Italians; her loss was officially attributed to an accident. None of the 21 crew survived the crash.

=== Record ===
Over a century after its flight, 6,800 kilometres (4,200 mi) in 95 hours is still the longest non-stop military airship flight in history.

== In popular culture ==
- The airship and its long-distance resupply mission was featured in The Ghosts of Africa, a 1980 historical novel by British-born Canadian novelist William Stevenson set during the East African Campaign.
- Polish pilot and novelist Janusz Meissner described this flight in his novel L59.
- The protagonist of O Olho de Hertzog, a 2010 novel by João Paulo Borges Coelho set in post–World War I Mozambique, arrives in Africa by jumping from the airship using a parachute.
- The Wilbur Smith novel Assegai has plot elements inspired by the airship's journey.
- L 59 is a centerpiece of the alternate history novel The Romanov Rescue by Tom Kratman, Justin Watson, and Kacey Ezell.

== Specifications ==
Data from Robinson 1971, p. 380

General characteristics

- Length: 226.50 m (743 ft 0 in)
- Diameter: 23.90 m (78 ft 5 in)
- Height: 27.76 m (91 ft 1 in)
- Volume: 68,470 m^{3} (2,418,000 cu ft)
- Useful lift: 23,500 kg (51,900 lb)
- Powerplant: 5 × Maybach HSLu piston engines , 180 kW (240 hp) each

Performance

- Maximum speed: 103 km/h (64 mph, 56 kn)
