= SM U-102 =

History

German Empire
- Name: U-102
- Ordered: 15 September 1915
- Builder: AG Weser, Bremen
- Yard number: 253
- Laid down: 12 August 1916
- Launched: 12 May 1917
- Commissioned: 18 June 1917
- Fate: Sunk by mine, 30 September 1918

General characteristics
- Class & type: German Type U 57 submarine
- Displacement: 750 t (740 long tons) surfaced; 952 t (937 long tons) submerged
- Length: 67.60 m (221 ft 9 in) (o/a); 54.02 m (177 ft 3 in) (pressure hull)
- Beam: 6.32 m (20 ft 9 in) (o/a); 4.05 m (13 ft 3 in) (pressure hull)
- Height: 8.25 m (27 ft 1 in)
- Draught: 3.65 m (12 ft)
- Installed power: 2 × 2,400 PS (1,765 kW; 2,367 shp) surfaced; 2 × 1,200 PS (883 kW; 1,184 shp) submerged
- Propulsion: 2 shafts, 2 × 1.65 m (5 ft 5 in) propellers
- Speed: 16.5 knots (30.6 km/h; 19.0 mph) surfaced; 8.8 knots (16.3 km/h; 10.1 mph) submerged
- Range: 10,100 nmi (18,700 km; 11,600 mi) at 8 knots (15 km/h; 9.2 mph) surfaced; 56 nmi (104 km; 64 mi) at 5 knots (9.3 km/h; 5.8 mph) submerged
- Test depth: 50 m (164 ft 1 in)
- Complement: 4 officers, 32 enlisted
- Armament: 4 × 50 cm (19.7 in) torpedo tubes (two bow, two stern); 10–12 torpedoes; 2 × 8.8 cm (3.5 in) SK L/30 deck gun

Service record
- Part of: II Flotilla; 5 August 1917 – 30 September 1918
- Commanders: Kptlt. Ernst Killmann; 5 August 1917 – 25 November 1917; Kptlt. Curt Beitzen; 26 November 1917 – 27 September 1918
- Operations: 7 patrols
- Victories: 5 merchant ships sunk (9,340 GRT); 1 auxiliary warship damaged (10,757 GRT)

SM U-102 or SM Unterseeboot 102 was a German Type U 57 submarine used by the Imperial German Navy in World War I. U-102 was launched on 12 May 1917. She was commissioned to the Imperial Navy on 18 June 1917.

== Service history ==
Serving with II Flotilla the U-boat carried out seven war patrols and sank four ships for a total of 9,340 gross register tons (GRT), and damaged another of 10,757 GRT tons (HMS Virginian).

About 28 to 30 September 1918 U-102 struck a mine in the North Sea Mine Barrage, east of the Orkney Islands while on her way to home. All of her 42 crew members' lives were claimed by the U-boat's sinking. The wreck of U-102 was located by a sonar sweep in 2006. Information to confirm the identification was obtained by divers in 2007.

== Summary of raiding history ==
| Date | Name | Nationality | Tonnage (Note: Merchant ship tonnages are in gross register tons. Military vessels are listed by tons displacement.) | Fate |
|---|---|---|---|---|
| 21 August 1917 | RMS Virginian | Royal Navy | 10,757 | Damaged |
| 8 December 1917 | Lucien | France | 200 | Sunk |
| 13 December 1917 | Noviembre | Spain | 3,500 | Sunk |
| 21 February 1918 | Cheviot Range | United Kingdom | 3,691 | Sunk |
| 3 March 1918 | Romeo | United Kingdom | 1,730 | Sunk |
| 24 June 1918 | Caroline | Denmark | 219 | Sunk |

== See also ==
- U-boat Campaign (World War I)

== Bibliography ==
- Gröner, Erich; Jung, Dieter; Maass, Martin (1991). U-boats and Mine Warfare Vessels. German Warships 1815–1945. Vol. 2. Translated by Thomas, Keith; Magowan, Rachel. London: Conway Maritime Press. ISBN 0-85177-593-4.
