= Type U 57 submarine =

German World War I submarine class

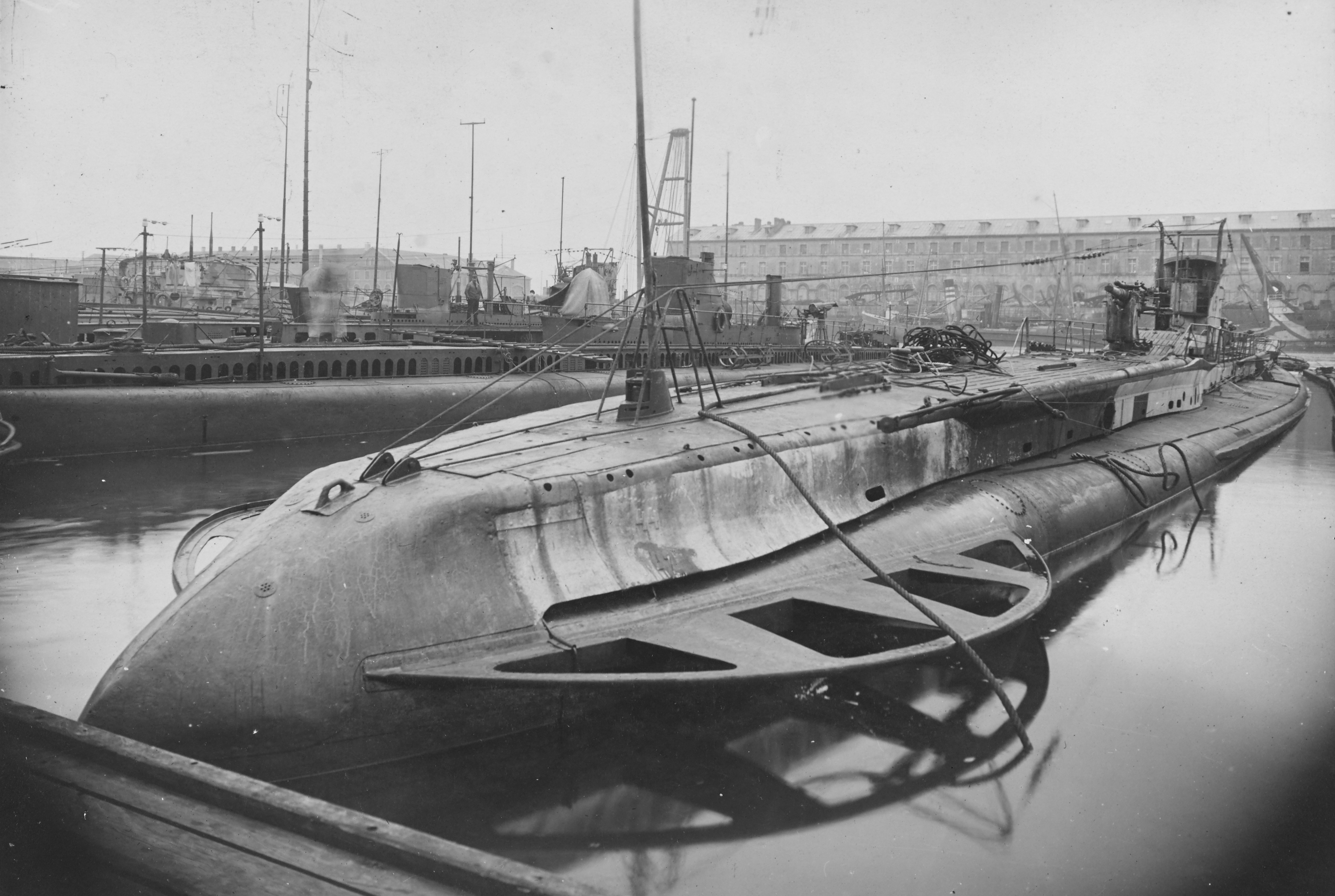
- U-57, lead ship of the Type U 57 class

Class overview
- Builders: A.G. Weser, Bremen
- Operators: Imperial German Navy
- Preceded by: Type U 51
- Succeeded by: Type U 63
- Completed: 12
- Lost: 7

General characteristics
- Displacement: 750–786 t (738–774 long tons) surfaced; 952–956 t (937–941 long tons) submerged
- Length: 67.00–67.7 m (219 ft 10 in – 222 ft 1 in) (o/a); 54.02–54.22 m (177 ft 3 in – 177 ft 11 in) (pressure hull)
- Beam: 6.32 m (20 ft 9 in) (oa); 4.05 m (13 ft 3 in) (pressure hull)
- Height: 8.05–8.25 m (26 ft 5 in – 27 ft 1 in)
- Draught: 3.65–3.79 m (12 ft 0 in – 12 ft 5 in)
- Installed power: 2 diesel engines, 1,700–2,400 PS (1,300–1,800 kW; 1,700–2,400 shp); 2 electric motors, 1,200 PS (883 kW; 1,184 shp)
- Propulsion: 2 shafts
- Speed: 14.7–16.5 knots (27.2–30.6 km/h; 16.9–19.0 mph) surfaced; 8.4–8.8 knots (15.6–16.3 km/h; 9.7–10.1 mph) submerged
- Range: 7,730–11,400 mi (12,440–18,350 km) at 8 knots (15 km/h; 9.2 mph) surfaced; 45.4–55 mi (73.1–88.5 km) at 5 knots (9.3 km/h; 5.8 mph) submerged
- Complement: 36
- Armament: 4 × 50 cm (19.7 in) torpedo tubes (two bow, two stern); 7-12 torpedoes; 1 or 2 × 8.8 cm (3.5 in) SK L/30 or 10.5 cm (4.1 in) SK L/45 deck guns

Type U 57 was a class of U-boats built during World War I by the Kaiserliche Marine. Six Type U 57 were ordered at the beginning of the war and these were commissioned in 1916. A further six were ordered in 1915 and commissioned in 1917. Seven were lost during the war and the remaining five surrendered to the Allies and were scrapped.

== Design ==
When World War I broke out on 28 July 1914, the German Navy initiated an emergency war building program, the so-called mobilisation program. This mobilisation program called for the immediate construction of seventeen U-boats by the two submarine building shipyard in Germany: the Germaniawerft in Kiel and the Kaiserliche Werft Danzig. The Kaiserliche Werft received an order for five Type U 43 U-boats and the Germaniawerft would have received an order for the remaining twelve U-boats, but since this yard experienced serious delays in the delivery of the previous order of eleven Type U 31 U-boats, only six Type U 51 U-boats were ordered from Germaniawerft on 23 August 1914 and the remaining six were ordered as Type U 57 from a new yard AG Weser.

When in August 1915 AG Weser had capacity to build extra U-boats, six more Mobilisation U-boats U-99 - U-104 were ordered from AG Weser based on the same Type U 57 design.

== Characteristics ==
The first three U 57s were fitted with two MAN six-cylinder two-stroke 8SS35 diesel engines with a total of 1,700 metric horsepower (1,250 kW; 1,677 bhp)t for use on the surface, the other nine Type U 57 U-boats were fitted with two more powerful S6V45/42 MAN diesel engines with a total of 2,400 metric horsepower (1,765 kW; 2,367 bhp). All Type U 57 had two Siemens-Schuckert double-acting electric motors with a total of 880 kW (1,196 PS; 1,180 shp) for underwater propulsion. These engines powered two shafts. Constructional diving depth (Note: Constructional diving depth had a safety factor of 2.5, which meant that crushing depth was 2.5 times construction diving depth.) was 50 m (164 ft 1 in).

All twelve Type U 57 U-boats were armed with four 50 cm (20 in) torpedo tubes, two fitted in the bow and two in the stern. U-57 - U-62 carried seven torpedoes and U-99 - U-104 carried ten to twelve torpedoes. Most boats received initially one or two 8.8 cm (3.5 in) SK L/30 deck guns. Some boats had one 8.8 cm deck gun replaced with a 10.5 cm (4.1 in) SK L/45 gun. The boats' complement was four officers and thirty-two enlisted men.

Differences in dimensions, speed, range and diesel engines
batch	U-57 - U-59	U-60 - U-62	U-99 - U-104
displacement surfaced	786 t (774 long tons)	768 t (756 long tons)	750 t (740 long tons)
displacement submerged	954 t (939 long tons)	956 t (941 long tons)	952 t (937 long tons)
Length	67.0 m (219.8 ft)	67.0 m (219.8 ft)	67.7 m (222 ft)
Beam	6.32 m (20.7 ft)		
Draught	3.79 m (12.4 ft)	3.74 m (12.3 ft)	3.65 m (12.0 ft)
Height	8.05 m (26.4 ft)	8.05 m (26.4 ft)	8.25 m (27.1 ft)
length pressure hull	54.22 m (177 ft 11 in)	54.02 m (177 ft 3 in)	54.02 m (177 ft 3 in)
diameter pressure hull	4.05 m (13 ft 3 in)		
speed surface	14.7 kn (27.2 km/h; 16.9 mph)	16.5 kn (30.6 km/h; 19.0 mph)	16.5 kn (30.6 km/h; 19.0 mph)
speed submerged	8.4 kn (15.6 km/h; 9.7 mph)	8.4 kn (15.6 km/h; 9.7 mph)	8.8 kn (16.3 km/h; 10.1 mph)
range surface at 8 knots	7,730–10,500 nmi (14,320–19,450 km; 8,900–12,080 mi)	8,600–11,400 nmi (15,900–21,100 km; 9,900–13,100 mi)	7,800–10,100 nmi (14,400–18,700 km; 9,000–11,600 mi)
range submerged at 5 knots	55 nmi (102 km; 63 mi)	49 nmi (91 km; 56 mi)	45.4 nmi (84.1 km; 52.2 mi)
diesel engines	8SS35 MAN	S6V45/42 MAN	S6V45/42 MAN

== Ships ==
Name	Launched	Commissioned	Merchant ships sunk (nbr / GRT )	Fate
U-57	29 April 1916	6 July 1916	55 / 91.680	Surrendered on 24 November 1918 and scrapped at Cherbourg in 1921
U-58	31 May 1916	9 August 1916	21 / 30.901	Lost on 17 November 1917 in the Bristol Channel
U-59	20 June 1916	7 September 1916	13 / 18.763	Lost on 14 May 1917 in the North Sea
U-60	5 July 1916	1 November 1916	52 / 108.191	Surrendered on 21 November 1918 and scrapped in 1921
U-61	22 July 1916	2 December 1916	34 / 84.861	Lost on 16 March 1918 in the Irish Sea
U-62	2 August 1916	30 December 1916	46 / 123.252	Surrendered on 21 November 1918 and scrapped at Bo'ness in 1919-20
U-99	27 January 1917	28 March 1917	none	Lost on 7 july 1917 in the North Sea
U-100	25 February 1917	16 April 1917	8 / 27.625	Surrendered on 21 November 1918 and scrapped at Swansea in 1919-20
U-101	1 April 1917	15 May 1917	24 / 29.813	Surrendered on 21 November 1918 and scrapped at Morecambe in 1920
U-102	12 May 1917	18 June 1917	5 / 13.245	Lost in September 1918 in the North Sea
U-103	9 June 1917	15 July 1917	7 / 15.481	Lost on 12 May 1918 in the English Channel
U-104	3 June 1917	12 August 1917	7 / 10.493	Lost on 5 April 1918 in St George's Channel

== Bibliography ==
- Gröner, Erich; Jung, Dieter; Maass, Martin (1991). German Warships 1815–1945, U-boats and Mine Warfare Vessels. Vol. 2. Translated by Thomas, Keith; Magowan, Rachel. London: Conway Maritime Press. ISBN 0-85177-593-4.
- Herzog, Bodo (1993). Deutsche U-Boote : 1906 - 1966 [German U-boats : 1906 - 1966] (in German). Erlangen: Müller. ISBN 9783860700365.
- Miller, David (2002). The Illustrated Directory of Submarines of the World. St. Paul, Minnesota: MBI Pub. Co. ISBN 978-0-7603-1345-9. OCLC 50208951.
- Möller, Eberhard; Brack, Werner (2004). The Encyclopedia of U-Boats (PDF). London: Chatham. ISBN 1-85367-623-3.
- Rössler, Eberhard (1981). The U-boat: The evolution and technical history of German submarines. London: Cassell & Co. ISBN 0-304-36120-8.
