= SM UB-109 =

- UB-148 at sea, a U-boat similar to UB-109.

History

German Empire
- Name: UB-109
- Ordered: 6 / 8 February 1917
- Builder: Blohm & Voss, Hamburg
- Cost: 3,714,000 German Papiermark
- Yard number: 315
- Launched: 7 July 1917
- Commissioned: 31 December 1917
- Fate: Sunk by mine on 29 August 1918 at 51°3′N 1°44′E

General characteristics
- Class & type: Type UB III submarine
- Displacement: 510 t (500 long tons) surfaced; 629 t (619 long tons) submerged
- Length: 55.30 m (181 ft 5 in) (o/a)
- Beam: 5.80 m (19 ft)
- Draught: 3.70 m (12 ft 2 in)
- Propulsion: 2 × propeller shaft; 2 × MAN-Vulcan four-stroke 6-cylinder diesel engines, 1,085 bhp (809 kW); 2 × Maffei electric motors, 780 shp (580 kW)
- Speed: 13.3 knots (24.6 km/h; 15.3 mph) surfaced; 7.5 knots (13.9 km/h; 8.6 mph) submerged
- Range: 7,420 nmi (13,740 km; 8,540 mi) at 6 knots (11 km/h; 6.9 mph) surfaced; 55 nmi (102 km; 63 mi) at 4 knots (7.4 km/h; 4.6 mph) submerged
- Test depth: 50 m (160 ft)
- Complement: 3 officers, 31 men
- Armament: 5 × 50 cm (19.7 in) torpedo tubes (4 bow, 1 stern); 10 torpedoes; 1 × 8.8 cm (3.46 in) deck gun

Service record
- Part of: Flandern I Flotilla; 30 March – 29 August 1918
- Commanders: Oblt.z.S. / Kptlt. Kurt Ramien; 31 December 1917 – 29 August 1918
- Operations: 3 patrols
- Victories: 7 merchant ships sunk (14,092 GRT)

SM UB-109 was a German Type UB III submarine or U-boat in the German Imperial Navy (German: Kaiserliche Marine) during World War I. She was commissioned into the German Imperial Navy on 31 December 1917 as SM UB-109. (Note: "SM" stands for "Seiner Majestät" (English: His Majesty's) and combined with the U for Unterseeboot would be translated as His Majesty's Submarine.)

UB-109 was sunk by mine in the English Channel on 29 August 1918 and underwater scanning of the area covered by the Dover Barrage shows her wreck broken in half.

== Construction ==
She was built by Blohm & Voss of Hamburg and following just under a year of construction, launched at Hamburg on 7 July 1917. UB-109 was commissioned later the same year under the command of Oblt.z.S. Kurt Ramien. Like all Type UB III submarines, UB-109 carried 10 torpedoes and was armed with a 8.8 cm (3.46 in) deck gun. UB-109 would carry a crew of up to 3 officer and 31 men and had a cruising range of 7,420 nautical miles (13,740 km; 8,540 mi). UB-109 had a displacement of 510 t (500 long tons) while surfaced and 629 t (619 long tons) when submerged. Her engines enabled her to travel at 13.3 knots (24.6 km/h; 15.3 mph) when surfaced and 7.4 knots (13.7 km/h; 8.5 mph) when submerged.

== Summary of raiding history ==
Date	Name	Nationality	Tonnage (Note: Tonnages are in gross register tons)	Fate
9 April 1918	President Leroy-lallier	France	1,320	Sunk
10 April 1918	Henley	United Kingdom	3,249	Sunk
13 April 1918	Wilson	United Kingdom	110	Sunk
18 April 1918	Runswick	United Kingdom	3,060	Sunk
19 August 1918	Zinal	United Kingdom	4,037	Sunk
25 August 1918	Pontet Canet	France	1,183	Sunk
26 August 1918	Helge	Sweden	1,133	Sunk

== Bibliography ==
- Bendert, Harald (2000). Die UB-Boote der Kaiserlichen Marine, 1914-1918. Einsätze, Erfolge, Schicksal (in German). Hamburg: Verlag E.S. Mittler & Sohn GmbH. ISBN 3-8132-0713-7.
- Gröner, Erich; Jung, Dieter; Maass, Martin (1991). U-boats and Mine Warfare Vessels. German Warships 1815–1945. Vol. 2. Translated by Thomas, Keith; Magowan, Rachel. London: Conway Maritime Press. ISBN 0-85177-593-4.
- Rössler, Eberhard (1979). Die deutschen U-Boote und ihre Werften: eine Bilddokumentation über den deutschen U-Bootbau; in zwei Bänden (in German). Vol. I. Munich: Bernard & Graefe. ISBN 3-7637-5213-7.
