= SM UB-80 =

German WW1 submarine

- UB-148 at sea, a U-boat similar to UB-80.

History

German Empire
- Name: UB-80
- Ordered: 23 September 1916
- Builder: AG Weser, Bremen
- Cost: 3,341,000 German Papiermark
- Yard number: 280
- Laid down: 12 May 1917
- Launched: 4 August 1917
- Commissioned: 8 September 1917
- Fate: Surrendered 26 November 1918

General characteristics
- Class & type: Type UB III submarine
- Displacement: 516 t (508 long tons) surfaced; 647 t (637 long tons) submerged
- Length: 55.85 m (183 ft 3 in) (o/a)
- Beam: 5.80 m (19 ft)
- Draught: 3.72 m (12 ft 2 in)
- Propulsion: 2 × propeller shaft; 2 × Körting four-stroke 6-cylinder diesel engines, 1,050 bhp (780 kW); 2 × Brown, Boveri & Cie electric motors, 780 shp (580 kW)
- Speed: 13.4 knots (24.8 km/h; 15.4 mph) surfaced; 7.5 knots (13.9 km/h; 8.6 mph) submerged
- Range: 8,180 nmi (15,150 km; 9,410 mi) at 6 knots (11 km/h; 6.9 mph) surfaced; 50 nmi (93 km; 58 mi) at 4 knots (7.4 km/h; 4.6 mph) submerged
- Test depth: 50 m (160 ft)
- Complement: 3 officers, 31 men
- Armament: 5 × 50 cm (19.7 in) torpedo tubes (4 bow, 1 stern); 10 torpedoes; 1 × 8.8 cm (3.46 in) deck gun

Service record
- Part of: Flandern I Flotilla; 6 November 1917 – 7 October 1918; II Flotilla; 7 October – 11 November 1918
- Commanders: Kptlt. Max Viebeg; 8 September 1917 – 11 November 1918
- Operations: 10 patrols
- Victories: 19 merchant ships sunk (34,746 GRT); 1 auxiliary warship sunk (732 GRT); 5 merchant ships damaged (26,322 GRT)

SM UB-80 was a German Type UB III submarine or U-boat in the German Imperial Navy (German: Kaiserliche Marine) during World War I. She was commissioned into the German Imperial Navy on 8 September 1917 as SM UB-80. (Note: "SM" stands for "Seiner Majestät" (English: His Majesty's) and combined with the U for Unterseeboot would be translated as His Majesty's Submarine.)

UB-80 was surrendered to Italy in accordance with the requirements of the Armistice with Germany on 26 November 1918 and broken up at La Spezia in May 1919.

== Construction ==
She was built by AG Weser of Bremen and following just under a year of construction, launched at Bremen on 4 August 1917. UB-80 was commissioned later that same year under the command of Kptlt. Max Viebeg. Like all Type UB III submarines, UB-80 carried 10 torpedoes and was armed with a 8.8 cm (3.46 in) deck gun. UB-80 would carry a crew of up to 3 officer and 31 men and had a cruising range of 8,180 nautical miles (15,150 km; 9,410 mi). UB-80 had a displacement of 516 t (508 long tons) while surfaced and 647 t (637 long tons) when submerged. Her engines enabled her to travel at 13.4 knots (24.8 km/h; 15.4 mph) when surfaced and 7.5 knots (13.9 km/h; 8.6 mph) when submerged.

== Summary of raiding history ==
| Date | Name | Nationality | Tonnage (Note: Merchant ship tonnages are in gross register tons. Military vessels are listed by tons displacement.) | Fate |
|---|---|---|---|---|
| 26 November 1917 | Ango | France | 7,393 | Damaged |
| 27 November 1917 | Bleamoor | United Kingdom | 3,755 | Sunk |
| 30 November 1917 | Kalibia | United Kingdom | 4,930 | Sunk |
| 4 December 1917 | Vav | Norway | 1,255 | Sunk |
| 5 December 1917 | Armenia | United States | 5,463 | Damaged |
| 11 January 1918 | Barsac | France | 1,806 | Sunk |
| 11 January 1918 | Mississippi | France | 6,687 | Damaged |
| 14 January 1918 | Arthur Capel | France | 822 | Sunk |
| 17 January 1918 | Kingsdyke | United Kingdom | 1,710 | Sunk |
| 17 January 1918 | War Thistle | United Kingdom | 5,166 | Damaged |
| 4 March 1918 | Polkerris | France | 943 | Sunk |
| 5 March 1918 | Uskmoor | United Kingdom | 3,189 | Sunk |
| 7 March 1918 | Martha | Belgium | 653 | Sunk |
| 9 March 1918 | Grane | Norway | 1,122 | Sunk |
| 15 April 1918 | Ailsa Craig | United Kingdom | 601 | Sunk |
| 16 April 1918 | George Harper | United Kingdom | 1,613 | Damaged |
| 18 April 1918 | Bamse | United Kingdom | 958 | Sunk |
| 21 April 1918 | Westergate | United Kingdom | 1,760 | Sunk |
| 25 April 1918 | Sevilla | Norway | 1,318 | Sunk |
| 7 June 1918 | Axpe Mendi | Spain | 2,873 | Sunk |
| 10 June 1918 | Stryn | United Kingdom | 2,143 | Sunk |
| 11 June 1918 | Boma | United Kingdom | 2,694 | Sunk |
| 30 July 1918 | HMS Stock Force | Royal Navy | 732 | Sunk |
| 6 September 1918 | Audax | United Kingdom | 975 | Sunk |
| 9 September 1918 | Taurus | Norway | 1,239 | Sunk |

== Bibliography ==
- Bendert, Harald (2000). Die UB-Boote der Kaiserlichen Marine, 1914-1918. Einsätze, Erfolge, Schicksal (in German). Hamburg: Verlag E.S. Mittler & Sohn GmbH. ISBN 3-8132-0713-7.
- Gröner, Erich; Jung, Dieter; Maass, Martin (1991). U-boats and Mine Warfare Vessels. German Warships 1815–1945. Vol. 2. Translated by Thomas, Keith; Magowan, Rachel. London: Conway Maritime Press. ISBN 0-85177-593-4.
- Rössler, Eberhard (1979). Die deutschen U-Boote und ihre Werften: eine Bilddokumentation über den deutschen U-Bootbau; in zwei Bänden (in German). Vol. I. Munich: Bernard & Graefe. ISBN 3-7637-5213-7.
