= HMS D6 =

Submarine of the Royal Navy

History

United Kingdom
- Name: HMS D6
- Builder: Vickers Armstrong, Barrow-in-Furness
- Laid down: 24 February 1910
- Launched: 23 October 1911
- Commissioned: 19 April 1912
- Fate: Sunk, 24 June 1918

General characteristics
- Class & type: D-class submarine
- Displacement: Surfaced: 483 tons; Submerged: 595 tons
- Length: 163.0 ft (49.7 m) (oa)
- Beam: 13.6 ft (4.1 m) (oa)
- Propulsion: 550 hp (410 kW) electric; 1,750 hp (1,300 kW) diesel; Twin screws
- Speed: Surfaced: 14 knots (26 km/h; 16 mph); Submerged: 9 knots (17 km/h; 10 mph)
- Range: Surfaced: 2,500 nmi (4,600 km; 2,900 mi) at 10 kn (19 km/h; 12 mph); Submerged: 45 nmi (83 km; 52 mi) at 5 kn (9.3 km/h; 5.8 mph)
- Complement: 25
- Armament: 3 × 18 in (46 cm) torpedo tubes (2 forward, one aft); 1 × 12-pounder gun

HMS D6 was one of eight D-class submarines built for the Royal Navy during the first decade of the 20th century.

== Description ==
The D-class submarines were designed as improved and enlarged versions of the preceding C class, with diesel engines replacing the dangerous petrol engines used earlier. D3 and subsequent boats were slightly larger than the earlier boats. They had a length of 164 feet 7 inches (50.2 m) overall, a beam of 20 feet 5 inches (6.2 m) and a mean draught of 11 feet 5 inches (3.5 m). They displaced 495 long tons (503 t) on the surface and 620 long tons (630 t) submerged. The D-class submarines had a crew of 25 officers and ratings and were the first to adopt saddle tanks.

For surface running, the boats were powered by two 600-brake-horsepower (447 kW) diesels, each driving one propeller shaft. When submerged each propeller was driven by a 275-horsepower (205 kW) electric motor. They could reach 14 knots (26 km/h; 16 mph) on the surface and 9 knots (17 km/h; 10 mph) underwater. On the surface, the D class had a range of 2,500 nautical miles (4,600 km; 2,900 mi) at 10 knots (19 km/h; 12 mph).

The boats were armed with three 18-inch (45 cm) torpedo tubes, two in the bow and one in the stern. They carried one reload for each tube, a total of six torpedoes.

== Construction and career ==
D6 was laid down on 24 February 1910 by Vickers at their Barrow shipyard, launched 23 October 1911 and was commissioned on 19 April 1912. She was the first British submarine to be equipped with a deck gun when built, a 12-pounder (3-inch/76 mm) gun. D6 was sunk by the German submarine UB-73 73 miles (117 km) north of Inishtrahull Island off the west coast of Ireland on 24 or 28 June 1918. There were only two survivors who were taken prisoner; one of whom was F. S. Bell, the submarine's second-in-command who would go on to command HMS Exeter at the Battle of the River Plate. The post-war report led the British to conclude that the torpedo that sank her had employed a magnetic pistol.
