= Old Thames Shipyard =

- Thames Shipyard
- U.S. National Register of Historic Places
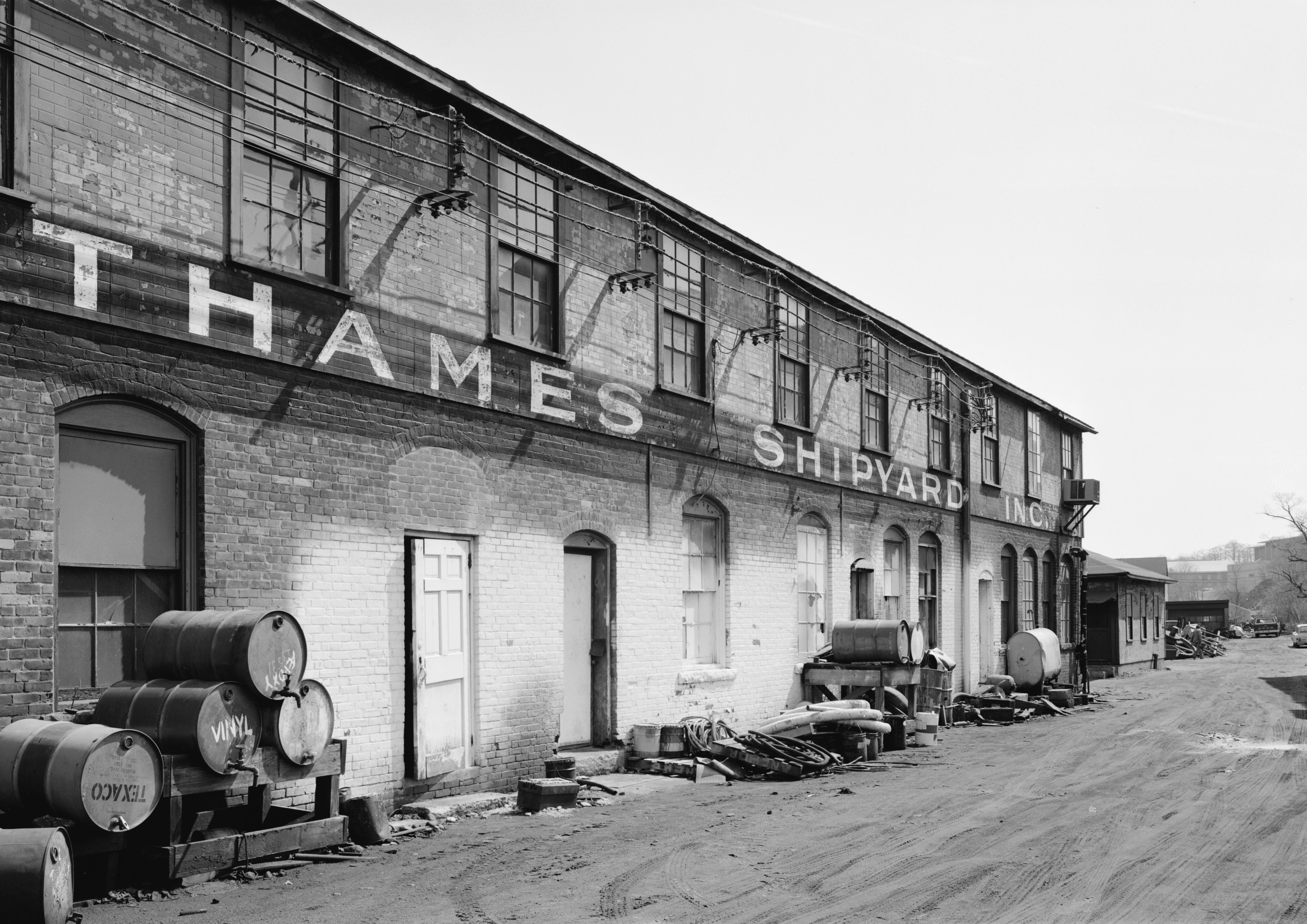

- Location within Connecticut Location within the United States
- Location: 50 Farnsworth Street, New London, Connecticut
- Coordinates: 41°22′43″N 72°5′53″W
- Area: 7.2 acres (2.9 ha)
- Built: 1900
- NRHP reference No.: 75001939
- Added to NRHP: April 17, 1975

The Old Thames Shipyard is a historic shipyard on the Thames River at the end of Farnsworth Street in New London, Connecticut. Established in 1900, the shipyard included, at the time of its listing on the National Register of Historic Places in 1975, a complete working steam-powered marine railway system, one of the few such in the nation.

== Description and history ==
The Old Thames Shipyard is located on the Thames River waterfront in northern New London, just north of the United States Coast Guard Academy. It is accessed via Farnsworth Street, down a steep slope to the waterfront, and is set on basically level terrain between the river and a railroad right-of-way. The property (as of 1975) included a brick headhouse, from which three sets of rails descended into the river. Two steam engines powered heavy chain winches (with a capacity of 1000 and 4000 deadweight tons respectively) for hauling boats out of the water. It was built by Thomas Chappell, who operated a fleet of tugs and barges for hauling coal, to service his ships at the Thames Tow Boat Company. During World War I and World War II the yard was used for shipbuilding, producing military and commercial ships.

John Wronowski took over the business (but not the property) from the Chappells in 1967. The shipyard property was taken by the United States Coast Guard in 1972, with plans to tear down the shipyard and expand its adjacent facilities. These plans were stalled by the National Register designation, and abandoned in 1976, amid disagreements with the city over the plans. Wronowski had fought the acquisition of the property, and was later given a waterfront area on Ferry Street in compensation, from which the Thames Shipyard operates. Wronowski, who had continued to lease this property from the Coast Guard, successfully acquired it in 1981. It now serves as the Thames Shipyard's North Yard, including its two main drydocks.

== See also ==
- National Register of Historic Places listings in New London County, Connecticut
