= SM UB-73 =

German Imperial Navy submarine

- UB-148 at sea, a U-boat similar to UB-73.

History

German Empire
- Name: UB-73
- Ordered: 23 September 1916
- Builder: AG Vulcan, Hamburg
- Cost: 3,337,000 German Papiermark
- Yard number: 97
- Launched: 11 August 1917
- Commissioned: 2 October 1917
- Fate: Surrendered to the French on 21 November 1918, broken up at Brest July 1921.

General characteristics
- Class & type: Type UB III submarine
- Displacement: 508 t (500 long tons) surfaced; 639 t (629 long tons) submerged
- Length: 55.52 m (182 ft 2 in) (o/a)
- Beam: 5.76 m (18 ft 11 in)
- Draught: 3.70 m (12 ft 2 in)
- Propulsion: 2 × propeller shaft; 2 × Körting four-stroke 6-cylinder diesel engines, 1,050 bhp (780 kW); 2 × Siemens-Schuckert electric motors, 780 shp (580 kW)
- Speed: 13.4 knots (24.8 km/h; 15.4 mph) surfaced; 7.5 knots (13.9 km/h; 8.6 mph) submerged
- Range: 8,420 nmi (15,590 km; 9,690 mi) at 6 knots (11 km/h; 6.9 mph) surfaced; 55 nmi (102 km; 63 mi) at 4 knots (7.4 km/h; 4.6 mph) submerged
- Test depth: 50 m (160 ft)
- Complement: 3 officers, 31 men
- Armament: 5 × 50 cm (19.7 in) torpedo tubes (4 bow, 1 stern); 10 torpedoes; 1 × 8.8 cm (3.46 in) deck gun

Service record
- Part of: V Flotilla; 30 November 1917 – 2 May 1918; I Flotilla; 2 May – 11 November 1918
- Commanders: Kptlt. Woldemar Adam; 2 October 1917 – 28 February 1918; Kptlt. Karl Neureuther; 1 March – 7 July 1918; Kptlt. Max Bräutigam; 8 July – 11 November 1918
- Operations: 6 patrols
- Victories: 8 merchant ships sunk (18,806 GRT); 1 warship sunk (495 tons)

SM UB-73 was a German Type UB III submarine or U-boat in the German Imperial Navy (German: Kaiserliche Marine) during World War I. She was commissioned into the German Imperial Navy on 2 October 1917 as SM UB-73. (Note: "SM" stands for "Seiner Majestät" (English: His Majesty's) and combined with the U for Unterseeboot would be translated as His Majesty's Submarine.)

UB-73 was serving in the Mediterranean. On 21 November 1918 she was surrendered to France as required by the regulations of the Armistice with Germany.

== Construction ==
UB-72 was ordered by the GIN on 23 September 1916.

She was built by AG Vulcan of Hamburg and following just under a year of construction, launched at Hamburg on 11 August 1917. UB-73 was commissioned later that same year. Like all Type UB III submarines, UB-73 carried 10 torpedoes and was armed with a 8.8 cm (3.46 in) deck gun. UB-73 would carry a crew of up to 3 officer and 31 men and had a cruising range of 8,420 nautical miles (15,590 km; 9,690 mi). UB-73 had a displacement of 508 t (500 long tons) while surfaced and 639 t (629 long tons) when submerged. Her engines enabled her to travel at 13.4 knots (24.8 km/h; 15.4 mph) when surfaced and 7.5 knots (13.9 km/h; 8.6 mph) when submerged.

== Summary of raiding history ==
Date	Name	Nationality	Tonnage (Note: Merchant ship tonnages are in gross register tons. Military vessels are listed by tons displacement.)	Fate
7 April 1918	Catriena	Netherlands	115	Sunk
11 April 1918	Myrtle Branch	United Kingdom	3,741	Sunk
14 April 1918	Chelford	United Kingdom	2,995	Sunk
16 April 1918	Ladoga	United Kingdom	1,917	Sunk
16 April 1918	Lodaner	United Kingdom	3,291	Sunk
18 April 1918	Dalegarth Force	United Kingdom	684	Sunk
23 June 1918	Mountain Laurel	Norway	705	Sunk
24 June 1918	HMS D6	Royal Navy	495	Sunk
25 June 1918	Orissa	United Kingdom	5,358	Sunk

== Bibliography ==
- Bendert, Harald (2000). Die UB-Boote der Kaiserlichen Marine, 1914-1918. Einsätze, Erfolge, Schicksal (in German). Hamburg: Verlag E.S. Mittler & Sohn GmbH. ISBN 3-8132-0713-7.
- Gröner, Erich; Jung, Dieter; Maass, Martin (1991). U-boats and Mine Warfare Vessels. German Warships 1815–1945. Vol. 2. Translated by Thomas, Keith; Magowan, Rachel. London: Conway Maritime Press. ISBN 0-85177-593-4.
- Rössler, Eberhard (1979). Die deutschen U-Boote und ihre Werften: eine Bilddokumentation über den deutschen U-Bootbau; in zwei Bänden (in German). Vol. I. Munich: Bernard & Graefe. ISBN 3-7637-5213-7.
