= HMS Coreopsis (1917) =

Minesweeper of the Royal Navy

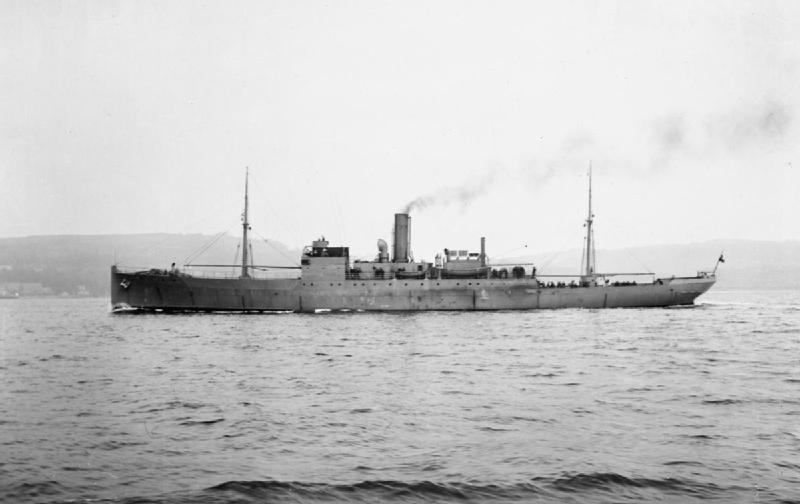

History

United Kingdom
- Name: HMS Coreopsis
- Ordered: February 1917
- Builder: Barclay Curle, Whiteinch, Scotland
- Launched: 15 September 1917
- Commissioned: 8 October 1917
- Fate: Sold 6 September 1922. Broken up at Preston, Lancashire 5 May 1924.

General characteristics
- Class & type: Anchusa-class sloop
- Displacement: 1,290 long tons (1,311 t)
- Length: 250 ft (76 m) p/p; 262 ft 3 in (79.93 m) o/a
- Beam: 35 ft (11 m)
- Draught: 11 ft 6 in (3.51 m) mean; 12 ft 6 in (3.81 m) – 13 ft 8 in (4.17 m) deep
- Propulsion: 4-cylinder triple expansion engine; 2 boilers; 2,500 hp (1,864 kW); 1 screw
- Speed: 16 knots (30 km/h; 18 mph)
- Range: 260 long tons (260 t) coal
- Complement: 92
- Armament: 2 × QF 4 inch Mk IV guns or BL 4 inch Mk IX guns; 2 × 12-pounder guns; Depth charge throwers

HMS Coreopsis was an Anchusa-class sloop and Q-ship of the Royal Navy, built at the yards of Barclay Curle on Clydeside and launched on 15 September 1917. Employed as a decoy ship with concealed armament, she served with the Grand Fleet or in the Mediterranean operating from Gibraltar under the false names Beardsley and Bigott. After the end of the First World War, she was laid up before being sold for breaking on 6 September 1922, but did not arrive at Thos. W. Ward's yard in Preston, Lancashire until 5 May 1924.

HMS Coreopsis is sometimes confused with HM Drifter Coreopsis II, which is credited with sinking the German submarine SM UB-85 on 30 April 1918.
