= SM U-91 =

History

German Empire
- Name: U-91
- Ordered: 23 June 1915
- Builder: Kaiserliche Werft Danzig
- Yard number: 35
- Laid down: 1 August 1916
- Launched: 14 April 1917
- Commissioned: 17 September 1917
- Fate: Surrendered to France 26 November 1918, Broken Up at Brest July 1921

General characteristics
- Class & type: Type U 87 submarine
- Displacement: 757 t (745 long tons) surfaced; 998 t (982 long tons) submerged
- Length: 65.80 m (215 ft 11 in) (o/a); 50.07 m (164 ft 3 in) (pressure hull)
- Beam: 6.20 m (20 ft 4 in) (oa); 4.18 m (13 ft 9 in) (pressure hull)
- Height: 9.35 m (30 ft 8 in)
- Draught: 3.88 m (12 ft 9 in)
- Installed power: 2 × 2,400 PS (1,765 kW; 2,367 shp) surfaced; 2 × 1,200 PS (883 kW; 1,184 shp) submerged
- Propulsion: 2 shafts, 2 × 1.66 m (5 ft 5 in) propellers
- Speed: 16.8 knots (31.1 km/h; 19.3 mph) surfaced; 9.1 knots (16.9 km/h; 10.5 mph) submerged
- Range: 11,380 nmi (21,080 km; 13,100 mi) at 8 knots (15 km/h; 9.2 mph) surfaced; 56 nmi (104 km; 64 mi) at 5 knots (9.3 km/h; 5.8 mph) submerged
- Test depth: 50 m (160 ft)
- Complement: 4 officers, 32 enlisted
- Armament: 4 × 50 cm (19.7 in) torpedo tubes (two bow, two stern); 10-12 torpedoes; 1 × 10.5 cm (4.1 in) SK L/45 deck gun

Service record
- Part of: III Flotilla; 13 December 1917 – 11 November 1918
- Commanders: Kptlt. Alfred von Glasenapp; 17 September 1917 – 11 November 1918
- Operations: 8 patrols
- Victories: 37 merchant ships sunk (83,302 GRT); 2 merchant ships damaged (11,821 GRT)

SM U-91 (Note: "SM" stands for "Seiner Majestät" (English: His Majesty's) and combined with the U for Unterseeboot would be translated as His Majesty's Submarine.) was one of the 329 submarines serving in the Imperial German Navy in World War I. U-91 was engaged in the naval warfare and took part in the First Battle of the Atlantic.

== Design ==
Type U 87 submarines were preceded by the shorter Type U 81 submarines. U-91 had a displacement of 757 tonnes (745 long tons) when at the surface and 998 tonnes (982 long tons) while submerged. She had a total length of 65.80 m (215 ft 11 in), a pressure hull length of 50.07 m (164 ft 3 in), a beam of 6.20 m (20 ft 4 in), a height of 9.35 m (30 ft 8 in), and a draught of 3.88 m (12 ft 9 in). The submarine was powered by two 2,400 metric horsepower (1,800 kW; 2,400 shp) engines for use while surfaced, and two 1,200 metric horsepower (880 kW; 1,200 shp) engines for use while submerged. She had two propeller shafts. She was capable of operating at depths of up to 50 metres (160 ft).

The submarine had a maximum surface speed of 15.6 knots (28.9 km/h; 18.0 mph) and a maximum submerged speed of 8.6 knots (15.9 km/h; 9.9 mph). When submerged, she could operate for 56 nautical miles (104 km; 64 mi) at 5 knots (9.3 km/h; 5.8 mph); when surfaced, she could travel 11,380 nautical miles (21,080 km; 13,100 mi) at 8 knots (15 km/h; 9.2 mph). U-91 was fitted with four 50 centimetres (20 in) torpedo tubes (two at the bow and two at the stern), ten to twelve torpedoes, one 10.5 cm (4.1 in) SK L/45 deck gun, and one 8.8 cm (3.5 in) SK L/30 deck gun. She had a complement of thirty-six (thirty-two crew members and four officers).

== Summary of raiding history ==
Date	Name	Nationality	Tonnage (Note: Tonnages are in gross register tons)	Fate
24 December 1917	Elmleaf	United Kingdom	5,948	Damaged
28 December 1917	Robert Eggleton	United Kingdom	2,274	Sunk
2 January 1918	Boston City	United Kingdom	2,711	Sunk
4 January 1918	Otto	United Kingdom	139	Sunk
5 January 1918	Knightsgarth	United Kingdom	2,889	Sunk
7 January 1918	Premier	United Kingdom	89	Sunk
19 February 1918	Beacon Light	United Kingdom	2,768	Sunk
22 February 1918	Haileybury	United Kingdom	2,888	Sunk
23 February 1918	Birchleaf	United Kingdom	5,873	Damaged
23 February 1918	British Viscount	United Kingdom	3,287	Sunk
24 February 1918	Renfrew	United Kingdom	3,830	Sunk
2 March 1918	Bessy	United Kingdom	60	Sunk
20 April 1918	Florrieston	United Kingdom	3,366	Sunk
21 April 1918	Landonia	United Kingdom	2,504	Sunk
21 April 1918	Normandiet	United Kingdom	1,843	Sunk
22 April 1918	Baron Herries	United Kingdom	1,610	Sunk
26 April 1918	Ethel	United Kingdom	100	Sunk
27 April 1918	Gresham	United Kingdom	3,774	Sunk
27 April 1918	Walpas	Russia	312	Sunk
28 April 1918	Damao	Portugal	5,668	Sunk
28 April 1918	Oronsa	United Kingdom	8,075	Sunk
28 April 1918	Raymond	France	109	Sunk
1 July 1918	Westmoor	United Kingdom	4,329	Sunk
6 July 1918	Port Hardy	United Kingdom	6,533	Sunk
9 July 1918	Silvia	Italy	3,571	Sunk
13 July 1918	Badagri	United Kingdom	2,956	Sunk
16 July 1918	Fisherman	United Kingdom	136	Sunk
25 July 1918	Tippecanoe	United States	6,187	Sunk
1 October 1918	Therese et Marthe	France	32	Sunk
2 October 1918	Maia	France	185	Sunk
2 October 1918	Marie Emmanuel	France	32	Sunk
2 October 1918	Ave Maris Stella	France	22	Sunk
4 October 1918	Mercedes	Spain	2,164	Sunk
5 October 1918	Heathpark	United Kingdom	2,205	Sunk
5 October 1918	Erindring	United Kingdom	1,229	Sunk
8 October 1918	Cazengo	Portugal	3,009	Sunk
9 October 1918	Pierre	France	354	Sunk
11 October 1918	Luksefjell	Norway	2,007	Sunk
14 October 1918	Bayard	France	55	Sunk

== Bibliography ==
- Gröner, Erich; Jung, Dieter; Maass, Martin (1991). U-boats and Mine Warfare Vessels. German Warships 1815–1945. Vol. 2. Translated by Thomas, Keith; Magowan, Rachel. London: Conway Maritime Press. ISBN 0-85177-593-4.
