= SS Rye (1914) =

History
- Name: 1914–1918: SS Rye
- Operator: 1914–1918: Lancashire and Yorkshire Railway
- Port of registry: (United Kingdom)
- Builder: Clyde Shipbuilding Company Port Glasgow
- Yard number: 309
- Launched: 21 May 1914
- Fate: Sunk 7 April 1918

General characteristics
- Tonnage: 1,098 gross register tons (GRT)
- Length: 240 feet (73 m)
- Beam: 34.1 feet (10.4 m)
- Draught: 15.3 feet (4.7 m)

SS Rye was a freight vessel built for the Lancashire and Yorkshire Railway in 1914.

== History ==
The ship was built by Clyde Shipbuilding Company Port Glasgow for the Lancashire and Yorkshire Railway and launched on 21 May 1914. She underwent trials in June 1914.

The coaster was torpedoed and sunk in the English Channel 19 nautical miles (35 km) northwest by west of Cap d'Antifer, Seine-Maritime, France (49°57′N 0°07′W) on 7 April 1918 by the Imperial German Navy submarine SM UB-74 with the loss of four of her crew.
