= SM UB-74 =

German Imperial Navy submarine

- UB-148 at sea, a U-boat similar to UB-74.

History

German Empire
- Name: UB-74
- Ordered: 23 September 1916
- Builder: AG Vulcan, Hamburg
- Cost: 3,337,000 German Papiermark
- Yard number: 98
- Launched: 12 September 1917
- Commissioned: 24 October 1917
- Fate: Sunk 26 May 1918

General characteristics
- Class & type: Type UB III submarine
- Displacement: 508 t (500 long tons) surfaced; 639 t (629 long tons) submerged
- Length: 55.52 m (182 ft 2 in) (o/a)
- Beam: 5.76 m (18 ft 11 in)
- Draught: 3.70 m (12 ft 2 in)
- Propulsion: 2 × propeller shaft; 2 × Körting four-stroke 6-cylinder diesel engines, 1,050 bhp (780 kW); 2 × Siemens-Schuckert electric motors, 780 shp (580 kW)
- Speed: 13.4 knots (24.8 km/h; 15.4 mph) surfaced; 7.5 knots (13.9 km/h; 8.6 mph) submerged
- Range: 8,420 nmi (15,590 km; 9,690 mi) at 6 knots (11 km/h; 6.9 mph) surfaced; 55 nmi (102 km; 63 mi) at 4 knots (7.4 km/h; 4.6 mph) submerged
- Test depth: 50 m (160 ft)
- Complement: 3 officers, 31 men
- Armament: 5 × 50 cm (19.7 in) torpedo tubes (4 bow, 1 stern); 10 torpedoes; 1 × 8.8 cm (3.46 in) deck gun

Service record
- Part of: V Flotilla; 6 – 25 January 1918; Flandern I Flotilla; 25 January – 26 May 1918
- Commanders: Kptlt. Karl Neureuther; 24 October 1917 – 30 January 1918; Oblt.z.S. Ernst Steindorff; 31 January – 26 May 1918
- Operations: 4 patrols
- Victories: 7 merchant ships sunk (13,294 GRT); 3 merchant ships damaged (12,817 GRT)

SM UB-74 was a German Type UB III submarine or U-boat in the German Imperial Navy (German: Kaiserliche Marine) during World War I. She was commissioned into the German Imperial Navy on 24 October 1917 as SM UB-74. (Note: "SM" stands for "Seiner Majestät" (English: His Majesty's) and combined with the U for Unterseeboot would be translated as His Majesty's Submarine.)

UB-74 was serving in the Flanders Flotillas. On 26 May 1918 she was sunk by HMS Lorna with depth charges at position 50°32′N 2°32′W in the English Channel.

== Construction ==
She was built by AG Vulcan of Hamburg and following just under a year of construction, launched at Hamburg on 12 September 1917. UB-74 was commissioned later that same year under the command of Kptlt. Karl Neureuther. Like all Type UB III submarines, UB-74 carried 10 torpedoes and was armed with a 8.8 cm (3.46 in) deck gun. UB-74 would carry a crew of up to 3 officer and 31 men and had a cruising range of 8,420 nautical miles (15,590 km; 9,690 mi). UB-74 had a displacement of 508 t (500 long tons) while surfaced and 639 t (629 long tons) when submerged. Her engines enabled her to travel at 13.4 knots (24.8 km/h; 15.4 mph) when surfaced and 7.5 knots (13.9 km/h; 8.6 mph) when submerged.

== Summary of raiding history ==
Date	Name	Nationality	Tonnage (Note: Tonnages are in gross register tons)	Fate
26 February 1918	Greavesash	United Kingdom	1,263	Sunk
26 February 1918	Romny	United Kingdom	1,024	Sunk
7 April 1918	Rye	United Kingdom	986	Sunk
10 April 1918	Paul Paix	United Kingdom	4,196	Damaged
12 April 1918	Luisa	Spain	3,603	Sunk
14 April 1918	Maroc	France	2,808	Sunk
15 April 1918	Tanfield	United Kingdom	4,538	Damaged
18 May 1918	John G. McCullough	United States	1,985	Sunk
23 May 1918	Skaraas	United Kingdom	1,625	Sunk
25 May 1918	Anne	United Kingdom	4,083	Damaged

== Bibliography ==
- Bendert, Harald (2000). Die UB-Boote der Kaiserlichen Marine, 1914-1918. Einsätze, Erfolge, Schicksal (in German). Hamburg: Verlag E.S. Mittler & Sohn GmbH. ISBN 3-8132-0713-7.
- Gröner, Erich; Jung, Dieter; Maass, Martin (1991). U-boats and Mine Warfare Vessels. German Warships 1815–1945. Vol. 2. Translated by Thomas, Keith; Magowan, Rachel. London: Conway Maritime Press. ISBN 0-85177-593-4.
- Rössler, Eberhard (1979). Die deutschen U-Boote und ihre Werften: eine Bilddokumentation über den deutschen U-Bootbau; in zwei Bänden (in German). Vol. I. Munich: Bernard & Graefe. ISBN 3-7637-5213-7.
