= SM UB-85 =

World War I U-boat in the German Imperial Navy

- UB-148 at sea, a U-boat similar to UB-85.

History

German Empire
- Name: UB-85
- Ordered: 23 September 1916
- Builder: AG Weser, Bremen
- Cost: 3,341,000 German Papiermark
- Yard number: 285
- Laid down: 24 January 1917
- Launched: 26 October 1917
- Commissioned: 24 November 1917
- Fate: Sunk 30 April 1918

General characteristics
- Class & type: Type UB III submarine
- Displacement: 516 t (508 long tons) surfaced; 647 t (637 long tons) submerged
- Length: 55.85 m (183 ft 3 in) (o/a)
- Beam: 5.80 m (19 ft)
- Draught: 3.72 m (12 ft 2 in)
- Propulsion: 2 × propeller shaft; 2 × Daimler four-stroke 6-cylinder diesel engines, 1,050 bhp (780 kW); 2 × BBC electric motors, 780 shp (580 kW)
- Speed: 13.4 knots (24.8 km/h; 15.4 mph) surfaced; 7.5 knots (13.9 km/h; 8.6 mph) submerged
- Range: 8,180 nmi (15,150 km; 9,410 mi) at 6 knots (11 km/h; 6.9 mph) surfaced; 50 nmi (93 km; 58 mi) at 4 knots (7.4 km/h; 4.6 mph) submerged
- Test depth: 50 m (160 ft)
- Complement: 3 officers, 31 men
- Armament: 5 × 50 cm (19.7 in) torpedo tubes (4 bow, 1 stern); 10 torpedoes; 1 × 8.8 cm (3.46 in) deck gun

Service record
- Part of: V Flotilla; 10 February – 30 April 1918
- Commanders: Kptlt. Günther Krech; 24 November 1917 – 30 April 1918
- Operations: 2 patrols
- Victories: None

SM UB-85 (Note: "SM" stands for "Seiner Majestät" (English: His Majesty's) and combined with the U for Unterseeboot would be translated as His Majesty's Submarine.) was a Type UB III U-boat in the German Imperial Navy (German: Kaiserliche Marine) during World War I. Ordered on 23 September 1916, the U-boat was built at the AG Weser shipyard in Bremen and commissioned on 24 November 1917, under the command of Kapitänleutnant Günther Krech. She was sunk by a British patrol boat on 30 April 1918 after being unable to submerge. The captain was rumoured to have later claimed the submarine had been damaged by a sea monster.

== Construction ==
SM UB-85 was built by AG Weser of Bremen and following just under a year of construction, launched at Bremen on 26 October 1917, and was commissioned later that same year. Like all Type UB III submarines, UB-85 carried 10 torpedoes and was armed with a 8.8 cm (3.46 in) deck gun. UB-85 would carry a crew of up to 3 officers and 31 men and had a cruising range of 8,180 nautical miles (15,150 km; 9,410 mi). UB-85 had a displacement of 516 t (508 long tons) while surfaced and 647 t (637 long tons) when submerged. Her engines enabled her to travel at 13.4 knots (24.8 km/h; 15.4 mph) when surfaced and 7.5 knots (13.9 km/h; 8.6 mph) when submerged.

== Service history ==
On her second patrol, she was picked up by HM Drifter Coreopsis II (Note: Not HMS Coreopsis (1917), a sloop and Q-ship with which it is often confused.) off the coast of Belfast, Northern Ireland on 30 April 1918, after she was partly flooded through a semi-open hatch while trying to evade attack by the British vessel. The ingress of water could not be controlled, since cables for a heater in the officers' compartment had previously been laid through a watertight door, by order of Kapt. Krech. The submarine was forced to surface and was abandoned by her crew while under fire at position 54°47′N 5°23′W. No casualties occurred amongst the 34 crew who were taken as prisoners of war.

== Relationship with cryptozoology ==
Under interrogation, the captain is rumoured to have said that the submarine had surfaced the night before to recharge the batteries and had been attacked by a large sea creature, a "strange beast" that rose out of the deep and damaged the vessel, leaving it unable to submerge. The crew had fired their sidearms at the creature.

== Wreck ==
Engineers working on an electricity cable, the Western HVDC Link, discovered the almost intact wreck of a Type UB III submarine, believed to be either UB-85 or UB-82, lying off the Galloway coast in October 2016. Dr Innes McCartney who identified the wreck said: "We are certainly closer to solving the so-called mystery of UB-85 and the reason behind its sinking - whether common mechanical failure or something that is less easily explained."

== See also ==
- SM U-28

== Bibliography ==
- Bendert, Harald (2000). Die UB-Boote der Kaiserlichen Marine, 1914-1918. Einsätze, Erfolge, Schicksal (in German). Hamburg: Verlag E.S. Mittler & Sohn GmbH. ISBN 3-8132-0713-7.
- Gröner, Erich; Jung, Dieter; Maass, Martin (1991). German Warships 1815–1945, U-boats and Mine Warfare Vessels. Vol. 2. Translated by Thomas, Keith; Magowan, Rachel. London: Conway Maritime Press. ISBN 0-85177-593-4.
- Rössler, Eberhard (1979). Die deutschen U-Boote und ihre Werften: eine Bilddokumentation über den deutschen U-Bootbau; in zwei Bänden (in German). Vol. I. Munich: Bernard & Graefe. ISBN 3-7637-5213-7.
