= St George's Channel =

Sea channel connecting the Irish Sea and the Celtic Sea

- Sianel San Siôr (Welsh); Muir Bhreatan (Irish)
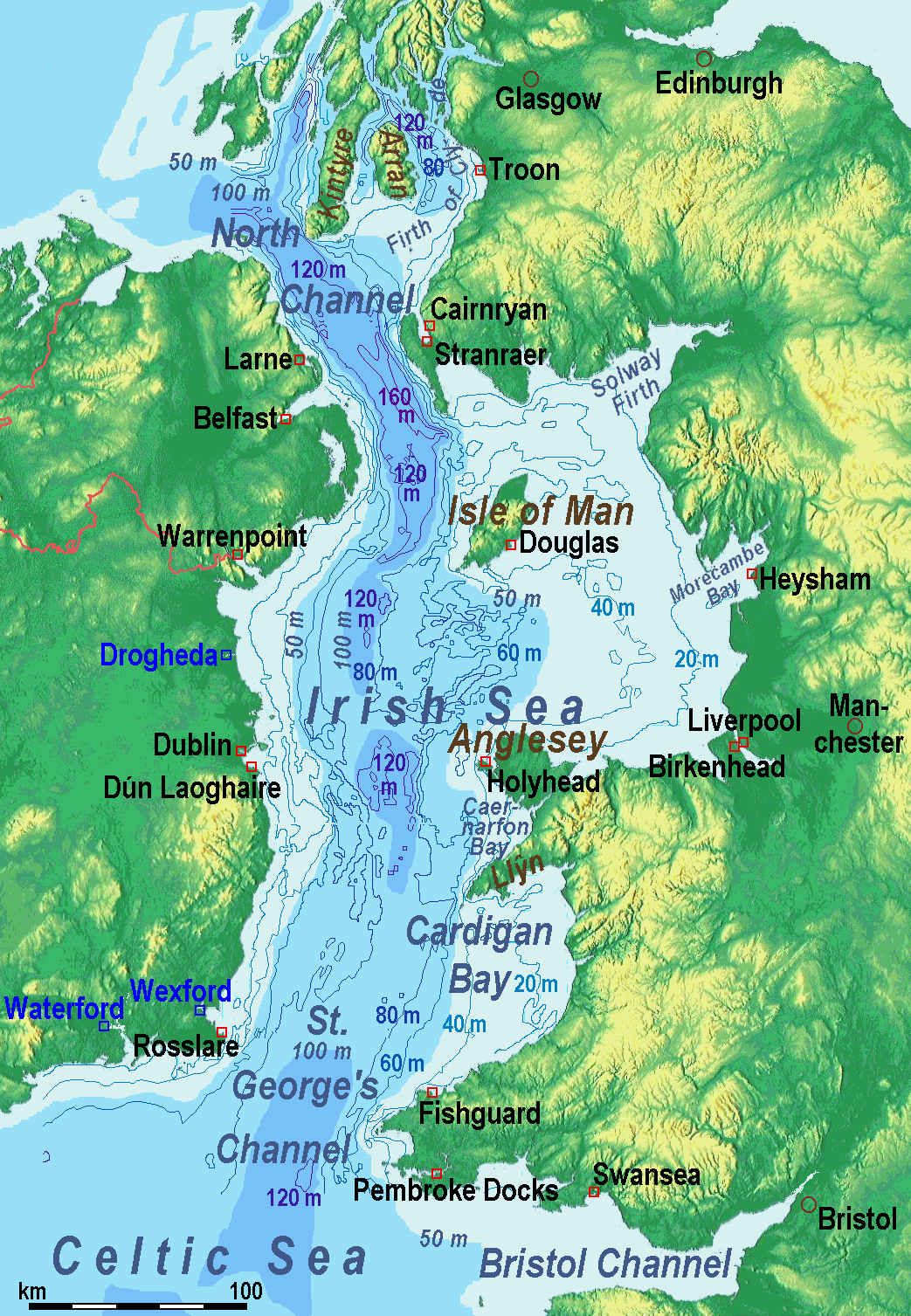
- Relief map depicting St George's Channel and the Irish Sea
- Interactive map of St George's Channel
- Location: British Isles
- Coordinates: 52°5′N 5°45′W
- Type: Sea channel
- Basin countries: United Kingdom; Republic of Ireland

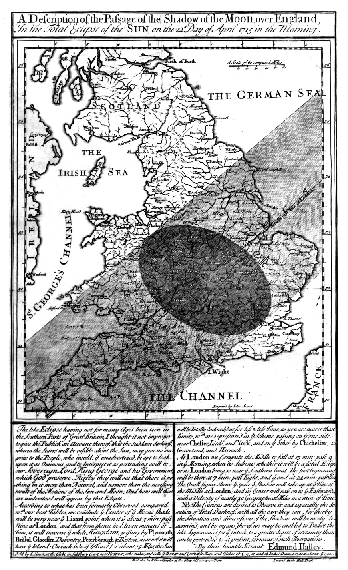
Edmond Halley's solar eclipse 1715 map showing St. George's Channel

St George's Channel (Welsh: Sianel San Siôr, Irish: Muir Bhreatan) is a sea channel connecting the Irish Sea to the north and the Celtic Sea to the southwest. It separates Wexford on the southeastern corner of Ireland from St Davids on the southwestern tip of Wales.

== Origin of name ==
The name "St George's Channel" is recorded in 1578 in Martin Frobisher's record of his second voyage. It is said to derive from a legend that Saint George had voyaged to Roman Britain from the Byzantine Empire, approaching Britain via the channel that bears his name. The name was popularised by English settlers in Ireland after the Plantations.

== Geography ==
Historically, the name "St George's Channel" was used interchangeably with "Irish Sea" or "Irish Channel" to encompass all the waters between Ireland to the west and Wales to the east. Some geographers restricted it to the portion separating Wales from Leinster, sometimes extending south to the waters between the West Country of England and East Munster; the latter have since the 1970s come to be called the Celtic Sea. In Ireland "St George's Channel" is now usually taken to refer only to the narrowest part of the channel, between Carnsore Point in County Wexford and St David's Head in Pembrokeshire. However, it is still possible in Ireland to hear about a "cross-channel trip", or "cross-channel soccer", etc., where "cross-channel" means "to/from Great Britain".

A 2004 letter from the St.George's Channel Shipping Company to Seascapes, an RTÉ Radio programme, said that St George's Channel bordered the Irish coast between Howth Head and Kilmore Quay, and criticised contributors to the programme who had used "Irish Sea" for these waters.

== Limits ==
The current (third, 1953) edition of the International Hydrographic Organization's publication Limits of Oceans and Seas defines the southern limit of "Irish Sea and St. George's Channel" as "A line joining St. David's Head (51°54′N 5°19′W) to Carnsore Point (52°10′N 6°22′W)"; it does not define the two waterbodies separately. The 2002 draft fourth edition omits the "and St. George's Channel" part of the label.

== See also ==
- Nicobar Islands in the Indian Ocean; the channel between Little Nicobar and Great Nicobar is also called St George's Channel
- North Channel (Great Britain and Ireland)
- Straits of Moyle
