= May 1918 =

Month in 1918

<<	May 1918					>>
Su	Mo	Tu	We	Th	Fr	Sa
			1	2	3	4
5	6	7	8	9	10	11
12	13	14	15	16	17	18
19	20	21	22	23	24	25
26	27	28	29	30	31

The following events occurred in May 1918:

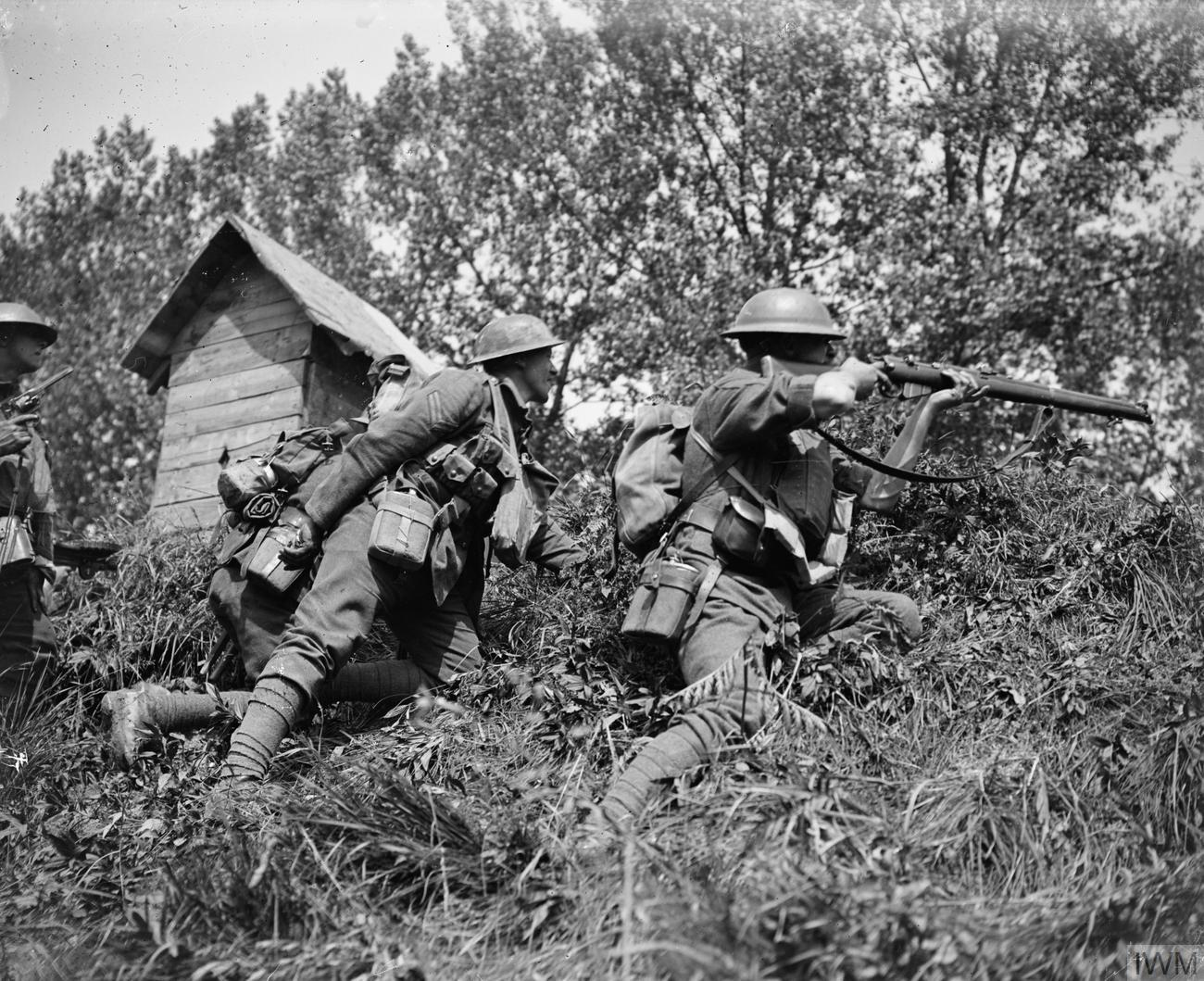
British troops hold the southern bank of the Aisne River during the first day of the Third Battle of the Aisne.

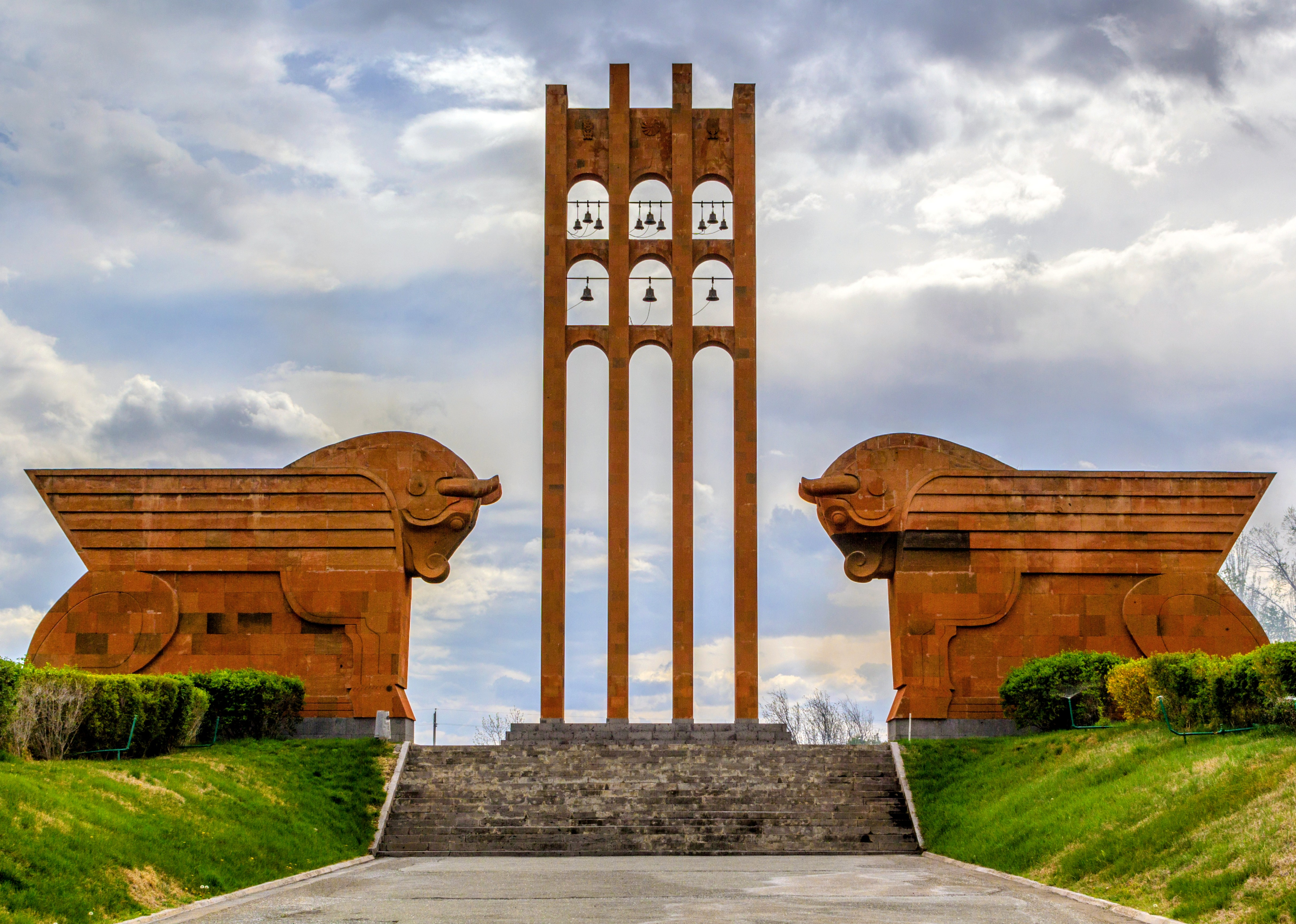
The memorial dedicated to the Armenian victory against the Ottoman Empire at the Battle of Sardarabad in Armenia.

== May 1, 1918 (Wednesday) ==
- The Egyptian Expeditionary Force captured the towns of Sunet Nimrun and Es Salt in Jordan but faced counterattacks from Ottoman and German forces.
- Battle of Lahti – The Red Guards fled their garrison at Hennala, ending the battle at Lahti, Finland. Some 30,000 Reds Guards and their supporters surrendered to the White Guards and the support German detachment force.
- The Royal Air Force established air squadron No. 252.
- The Kyung Sung Public Agricultural College was founded, the precursor to the University of Seoul.
- The Independent Voters Association was established as a conservative counterpart to the more socialist-leaning Nonpartisan League in North Dakota.
- Born: Jack Paar, American TV personality, host of The Tonight Show from 1957 to 1962; in Canton, Ohio, United States (d. 2004)
- Died: Grove Karl Gilbert, 74, American geologist, discoverer of the Meteor Crater in Arizona (b. 1843)

== May 2, 1918 (Thursday) ==
- Vyborg massacre – News of the murder of hundreds of Red Guard prisoners and civilians by White Guard militia in Vyborg, Finland reached White Guard commander Carl Gustaf Emil Mannerheim, He ordered an immediate investigation.
- German submarine SM UB-31 was sunk by depth charges from three Royal Navy ships with the loss of all 22 crew.
- Died: Jüri Vilms, 29, Estonian politician, first deputy prime minister of Estonia; executed (b. 1889)

== May 3, 1918 (Friday) ==
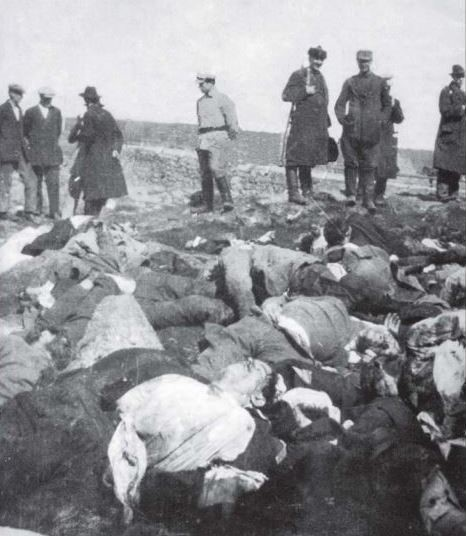
Victims of the Vyborg massacre in Finland.

- Vyborg massacre – Finnish commander Carl Gustaf Emil Mannerheim sent a telegram to the town commandant in Vyborg, Finland with an order to stop the massacre of Red Guard prisoners and ethnic Russians civilians in the town. In all, by the time the violence stopped, 1,200 people had been shot dead, including more than 800 Red Guard prisoners and between 360 and 420 civilians of Russian or affiliated ethnicity.
- Battle of Ahvenkoski – With the Kymi Valley now the last stronghold for the Red Guards in Finland, negotiations for surrender began with the Germans.
- The Soviet Red Army established the 6th Rifle Division in Gdov, Russia.
- Official war artist William Orpen opened his exhibition War in London and later donated the paintings to the British government. He was knighted in June.
- New Zealand writer Katherine Mansfield married her long-time partner John Middleton Murry at the Kensington register office in London.
- The University of the Philippines Cebu was established in Cebu, Philippines along with a preparatory school for students entering university.
- Born:
  - Richard Dudman, American journalist, member of the editorial staff for the St. Louis Post-Dispatch for over thirty years; in Centerville, Iowa, United States (d. 2017)
  - Ted Bates, English football player, forward for Southampton from 1937 to 1953 and manager from 1955 to 1973; as Edric Thornton Bates, in Thetford, England (d. 2003)
  - Mona Inglesby, British ballet dancer and choreographer, director of International Ballet; as Mona Vredenburg, in London, England (d. 2006)
- Died:
  - Derwas Cumming, 26, Australian Rules football player, forward for the Perth Football Club from 1907 to 1910, 1914 and Melbourne University Football Club from 1911 to 1912, recipient of the Military Cross; died from wounds sustained at the Second Battle of Villers-Bretonneux (b. 1891)
  - John Chase, 61, American army medical officer, commander of the Colorado National Guard during the Colorado Labor Wars and the Ludlow Massacre (b. 1856)

== May 4, 1918 (Saturday) ==
- The Egyptian Expeditionary Force retreated back to the Jordan Valley after failing to hold the towns of Sunet Nimrun and Es Salt, suffering 1,784 casualties while inflicting over 2,000 on the Ottomans.
- Soviet Russia established the Belomorsky, North Caucasus, and Volga Military Districts.
- The Senate of Finland was re-established in Vaasa, Finland.
- Baseball Ontario was established as the provincial governing body of the sport in Hamilton, Ontario.
- Born: Kakuei Tanaka, Japanese state leader, 40th Prime Minister of Japan; in Nishiyama, Niigata, Empire of Japan (present-day Japan) (d. 1993)
- Died: Howard Burnham, 46, American engineer and spy, collected intelligence for France while conducting mining surveying work in the Alps during World War I, brother to Frederick Russell Burnham (b. 1870)

== May 5, 1918 (Sunday) ==
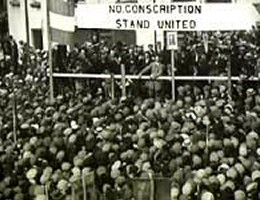
Irish nationalist leader John Dillon speaks from a platform at an anti-conscription rally in County Roscommon, Ireland.

- Battle of Ahvenkoski – The final force Red Guards of Finland surrendered at Ahvenkoski, Finland, with 800 soldiers laying down their arms to the German detachment force in Finland. The battle became the final military action of the Finnish Civil War.
- An estimated 15,000 people attended an anti-conscription meeting in County Roscommon, Ireland, where John Dillon, leader of the Irish Parliamentary Party, and Éamon de Valera of Sinn Féin shared the platform in a united cause against conscription.
- German submarine SM UB-119 was rammed and sunk in the Atlantic Ocean, killing all 34 crew.
- German submarine SM UB-70 disappeared after being seen in the Mediterranean Sea east of Gibraltar, with all 33 crew lost.
- The United States Army established the 1st Pursuit Group to support the American Expeditionary Forces on the Western Front.
- Mary Pickford starred in M'Liss, a remake of a 1915 film. It was directed by Marshall Neilan and adapted by screenwriter Frances Marion from the short story by Bret Harte.
- The village of Galahad, Alberta was established.
- Born: Egidio Galea, Maltese clergy, member of the Catholic resistance to Nazi Germany during World War II; in Birgu, Malta (d. 2005)

== May 6, 1918 (Monday) ==
- Nicaragua declared war on the Central Powers.
- The Don Cossacks under command of Pyotr Krasnov captured Rostov-on-Don in what was then the Don Soviet Republic, allowing German forces to occupy the city two days later. The area was later incorporated into the Don Republic.
- The United States Navy established the Coco Solo naval station near Cativá, Panama as part of the defense of the Panama Canal.
- Born:
  - Eva Kolstad, Norwegian politician and activist, promoter of women's rights in Norway and internationally, 18th Norwegian Association for Women's Rights, member of the United Nations Commission on the Status of Women from 1969 to 1975; as Eva Severine Lundegaard Hartvig, in Haldar, Norway (d. 1999)
  - Zayed bin Sultan Al Nahyan, Arabic noble and state leader, first President of the United Arab Emirates; in Abu Dhabi, Trucial States (present-day United Arab Emirates) (d. 2004)

== May 7, 1918 (Tuesday) ==
- Romania signed a treaty with the Central Powers to end its involvement with World War I but it was never ratified as Romanian monarch King Ferdinand refused to sign it. It was nullified when an armistice was signed with Germany on November 11.

== May 8, 1918 (Wednesday) ==
- The first Muslim-Christian Association met in Jaffa, Palestine.
- German submarine SM U-32 was depth charged and sunk in the Mediterranean Sea north west of Malta by a Royal Navy ship with all 41 crew killed.
- Born: Ptolemy Reid, Guyanese state leader, second Prime Minister of Guyana; in Dartmouth, British Guiana (present-day Guyana) (d. 2003)

== May 9, 1918 (Thursday) ==
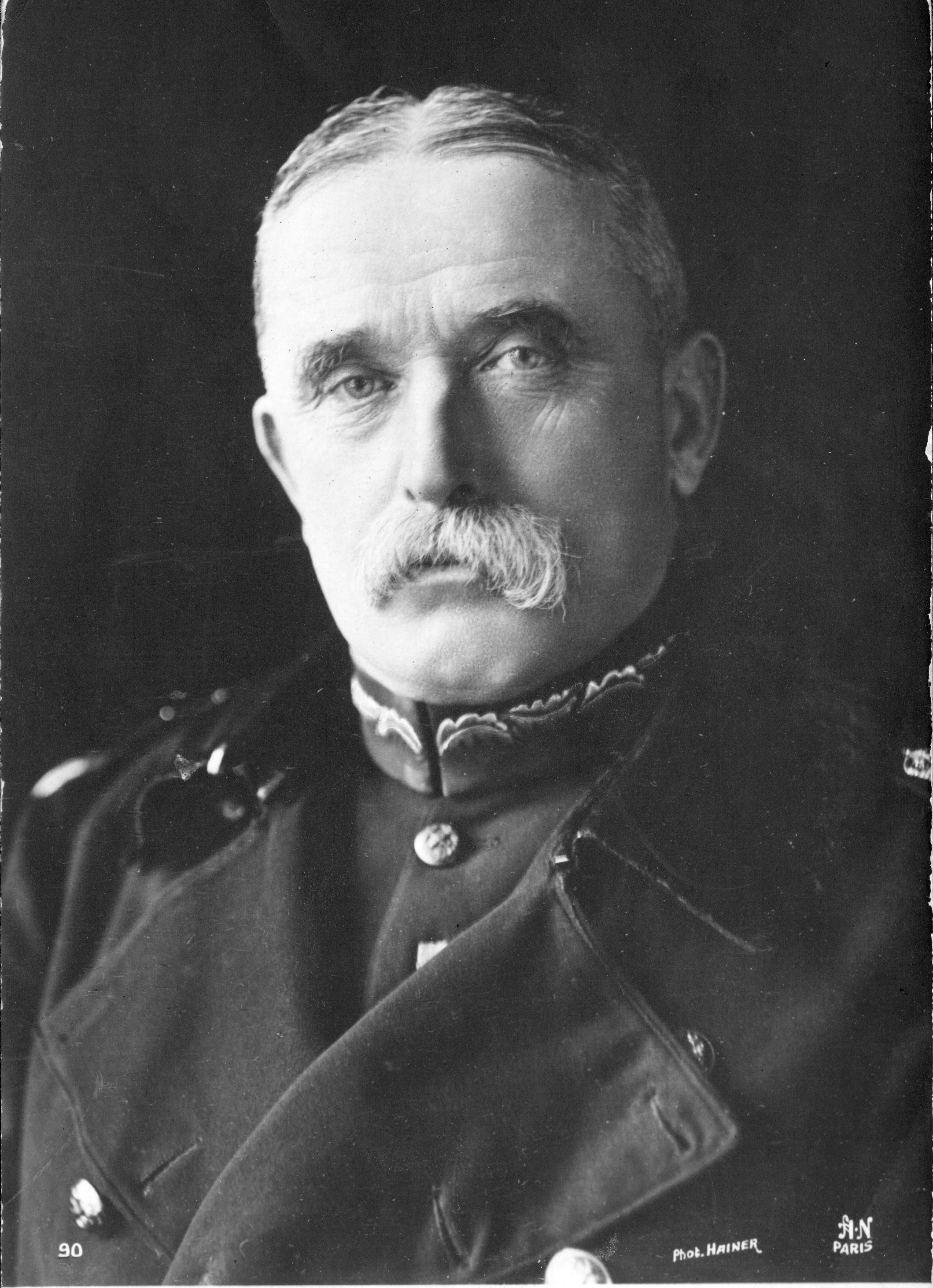
Field Marshal John French

- The Royal Navy failed in their second attempt to seal off the German U-boat base at Ostend, Belgium despite using the destroyer HMS Vindictive as a blockship.
- Liberal Party leader H. H. Asquith took up allegations of the British War Cabinet misleading Parliament about troop strengths on the Western Front from a letter published in the press on May 7 by Major-General Frederick Maurice of the British Army. The fierce debate in the House of Commons led to Prime Minister David Lloyd George refuting the claims and treating the issue as a vote of confidence, allowing him to win the debate and tip perception against Asquith as not being an effective wartime leader. The resulting vote was in favor of government support 295 votes to 108, although about half of the Members of Parliament were absent as they were serving in the war.
- Field Marshal John French was appointed Lord Lieutenant of Ireland and Supreme Commander of the British Army in Ireland.
- Germany conducted the first heavier-than-air raid on England since March, sending four Riesenfluzeuge bombers to Dover. High winds over the North Sea forced the squadron to turn back only to find their bases shrouded in fog. Only one landed safely, with the other three being destroyed in crashes.
- German submarine SM UC-78 was rammed and sunk in the English Channel off the coast of France by British steamer Queen Alexandra.
- French ace René Fonck shot down six German aircraft in a day.
- Edgar Sisson, an American field operative for the Committee on Public Information posted in Petrograd, began to introduce the first in a series of 68 Russian documents together titled The German-Bolshevik Conspiracy that alleged Russian revolutionary leaders Vladimir Lenin and Leon Trotsky had worked with Germany to bring about Russia's withdraw from World War I. The documents were later proven to be forgeries.
- The Royal Air Force established air squadron No. 158.
- Born:
  - Mike Wallace, American journalist, original and long-running member of the CBS news program 60 Minutes; as Myron Leon Wallace, in Brookline, Massachusetts, United States (d. 2012)
  - Orville Freeman, American politician, 29th Governor of Minnesota, 16th United States Secretary of Agriculture; in Minneapolis, United States (d. 2003)
  - Kyffin Williams, Welsh painter, best known for his landscape work of Wales; as John Kyffin Williams, in Llangefni, Wales (d. 2006)
- Died: Richard Hutton Davies, 56, English-New Zealand army officer, commander of the 6th Infantry Brigade and 20th Light Division during World War I, recipient of the Order of the Bath (b. 1861)

== May 10, 1918 (Friday) ==
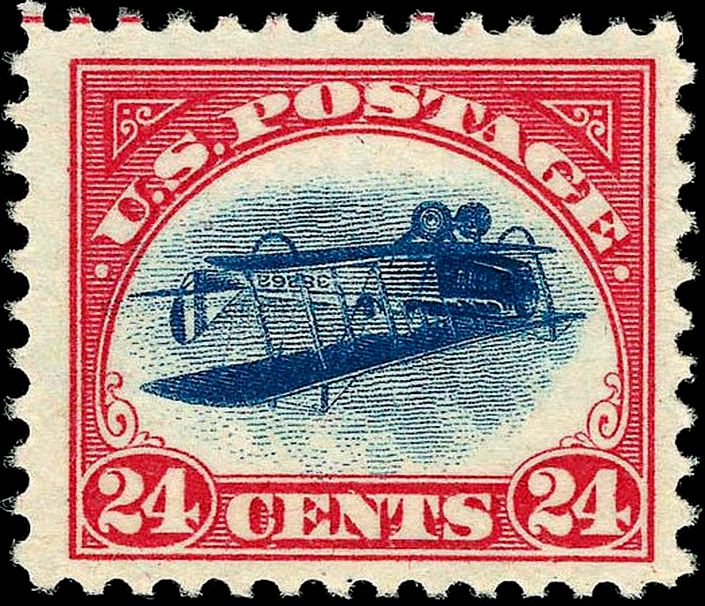
The 24-cent Inverted Jenny U.S. postage stamp, with the upside-down Curtiss Jenny airplane

- Battle of Kaniów – Around 8,000 troops with the Polish II Corps in Russia under command of Józef Haller were surprised and encircled by a larger Imperial German Army of 12,000 soldiers near Kaniów, Ukraine.
- German Zeppelin L 62 exploded and broke in half before crashing in flames over the North Sea with the loss of all hands. The German Naval Airship Service blamed her loss on an accident, while the Royal Air Force claimed one of its flying boats shot her down.
- German submarine SM UB-16 was torpedoed and sunk in the North Sea by Royal Navy submarine HMS E34 with the loss of 15 of her 16 crew.
- The Inverted Jenny postage stamp, which features an upside-down image of a Curtiss Jenny airplane, was issued by the United States Postal Service by accident. While probably the most famous errors in American philately, only one pane in 100 was ever found showing the error, making it also one of the most prized with an estimated value of US $977,500.
- Born:
  - Peter Porekuu Dery, Ghanaian clergy, Archbishop of Tamale from 1974 to 1994; in Wa, Gold Coast (present-day Ghana) (d. 2008)
  - R. N. Kao, Indian intelligence officer, first chief of the Research and Analysis Wing for the Government of India; as Rameshwar Nath Kao, in Benares, British India (present-day Varanasi, India) (d. 2002)
  - T. Berry Brazelton, American pediatrician, developer of the Neonatal Behavioral Assessment Scale; as Thomas Berry Brazelton, in Waco, Texas, United States (d. 2018)
  - George Welch, American air force officer and test pilot, recipient of the Distinguished Service Cross and Distinguished Flying Cross, Medal of Honor nominee for action during the attack on Pearl Harbor; in Wilmington, Delaware, United States (d. 1954, killed in a plane crash)
- Died: Alexander Oswald Brodie, 68, American army officer and politician, 15th Governor of the Arizona Territory, member of the Rough Riders during the Spanish–American War (b. 1849)

== May 11, 1918 (Saturday) ==
- The Mountainous Republic of the Northern Caucasus was officially established.
- Battle of Kaniów – After a full day of stiff resistance from the Polish II Corps in Russia, the German command offered a ceasefire. Germany suffered an estimated 1,500 dead while Polish forces sustained around 1,000 casualties, of those only two dozen died. Another 3,250 Polish troops were taken prisoner although many thousands, including commanding officer Józef Haller, managed to escape.
- Italian troopship Verona was sunk by German submarine SM UC-52, killing 880 passengers and crew.
- French Navy troopship Sant Anna was sunk in the Mediterranean Sea by German submarine SM UC-54, killing 605 passengers and crew.
- German submarine SM U-154 was torpedoed and sunk in the Atlantic Ocean by Royal Navy submarine HMS E35 with the loss of all 77 crew.
- Racing horse Exterminator with jockey Willie Knapp won the 44th running of the Kentucky Derby with a time of 2:10.08.
- British artist Paul Nash opened his exhibition The Void of War at the Leicester Galleries in London.
- The sports Club Universitario de Buenos Aires was established in Buenos Aires. It is most noted for its rugby union team but also offered a wide range of sports disciplines including basketball, boxing, association football, gymnastics, golf, field hockey, martial arts, swimming, tennis, volleyball and many others.
- Born:
  - Richard Feynman, American physicist, recipient of the Nobel Prize in Physics for his research into quantum mechanics; in New York City, United States (d. 1988)
  - Sheila Burnford, Scottish-Canadian children's writer, author of The Incredible Journey; in Edinburgh, Scotland (d. 1984)
- Died: George Elmslie, 57, Australian politician, 25th Premier of Victoria (b. 1861)

== May 12, 1918 (Sunday) ==
- German submarine SM UB-72 was depth charged and sunk in the English Channel by Royal Navy submarine HMS D4 with the loss of 34 of her crew.
- German submarine SM U-103 was rammed and sunk in the Atlantic Ocean by British ocean liner Olympic with the loss of nine of her 40 crew. Survivors were rescued by U.S. Navy destroyer USS Davis.
- The football Sport Club Gaúcho was established in Passo Fundo, Brazil.
- Born:
  - Julius Rosenberg, American spy, convicted along with Ethel for sharing state secrets with the Soviet Union; in New York City, United States (d. 1953, executed)
  - Mary Kay Ash, American business executive, founder of Mary Kay Cosmetics; as Mary Kathlyn Wagner, in Hot Wells, Texas, United States (d. 2001)
- Died: Rose Selfridge, 57, American-British socialite, wife to Harry Gordon Selfridge, the owner of the Selfridges department store chain (b. 1860)

== May 13, 1918 (Monday) ==
- The United States Postal Service issued the first airmail stamps to the public, bearing a picture of a Curtis "Jenny" airplane.
- German submarine SM UB-114 sank at Kiel, Germany with the loss of seven of her crew. The vessel was later raised.
- The French Army established the 501st Combat Tank Regiment.
- Children's author L. Frank Baum published the 12th Oz book, The Tin Woodman of Oz, which helped reverse a trend in declining sales of books in the series.
- Filmmaker William Desmond Taylor released Huck and Tom as a sequel to Tom Sawyer, with Jack Pickford and Robert Gordon reprising their roles of the Mark Twain characters.
- Fatty Arbuckle starred in the comedy short Moonshine, which he also directed. Portions of the film still survive.
- Born: Balasaraswati, Indian dancer and choreographer, known for her promotion of Bharatanatyam traditional dance, recipient of the Padma Bhushan and Padma Vibhushan civilian awards in India; as Tanjore Balasaraswati, in Madras, British India (present-day Chennai, India) (d. 1984)

== May 14, 1918 (Tuesday) ==
- Royal Navy destroyer HMS Phoenix was torpedoed and sunk in the Adriatic Sea by Austro-Hungarian submarine SM U-27, killing two of the 72 crew.
- South African mayor Harry Hands instituted the "Three Minute Pause", which was initiated by the daily firing of the Noon Gun on Signal Hill in Cape Town, South Africa. The ceremony inspired the introduction of the two-minute silence in November 1919.
- Iowa Governor William L. Harding issued a hard-line anti-German proclamation (later known as the Babel Proclamation) that stated "only English was legal in public or private schools, in public conversations, on trains, over the telephone, at all meetings, and in all religious services."
- Born: James Hardy, American surgeon, performed the first lung transplant; in Newala, Alabama, United States (d. 2003)
- Died: James Gordon Bennett Jr., 77, American newspaper mogul, publisher of the New York Herald (b. 1841)

== May 15, 1918 (Wednesday) ==
- The White Guards captured Russian-held Fort Ino at Neva Bay, Finland, formally ending all fighting in the Finnish Civil War.
- The United States Postal Service started the world's third regular airmail service between New York City, Philadelphia and Washington, D.C. Postmaster General Albert S. Burleson assigned Assistant Post Master General Otto Praeger additional duties as the first chief of the United States airmail service, telling Praeger, "The airmail once started must not stop, but must be constantly improved and expanded until it would become, like the steamship and the railroad, a permanent transportation feature of the postal service."
- The Royal Air Force established air squadron No. 145.
- The Packard-Le Père aircraft was first flown.
- Construction began on the Brooklyn Army Terminal in New York City.It opened in September 1919, ten months after World War I ended.
- Osaka Nomura Bank, as predecessor of Resona Holdings, a major financial group in Japan, was founded.
- The football club Violette was established in Port-au-Prince, Haiti.
- Born:
  - Eddy Arnold, American country music singer, second best-selling country music artist of all time with over 85 million records; as Richard Edward Arnold, in Henderson, Tennessee, United States (d. 2008)
  - Joseph Wiseman, Canadian actor, best known for Dr. No in the first James Bond film; in Montreal, Canada (d. 2009)
  - Arthur Jackson, American sharpshooter, bronze medalist at the 1952 Summer Olympics; in New York City, United States (d. 2015)

== May 16, 1918 (Thursday) ==
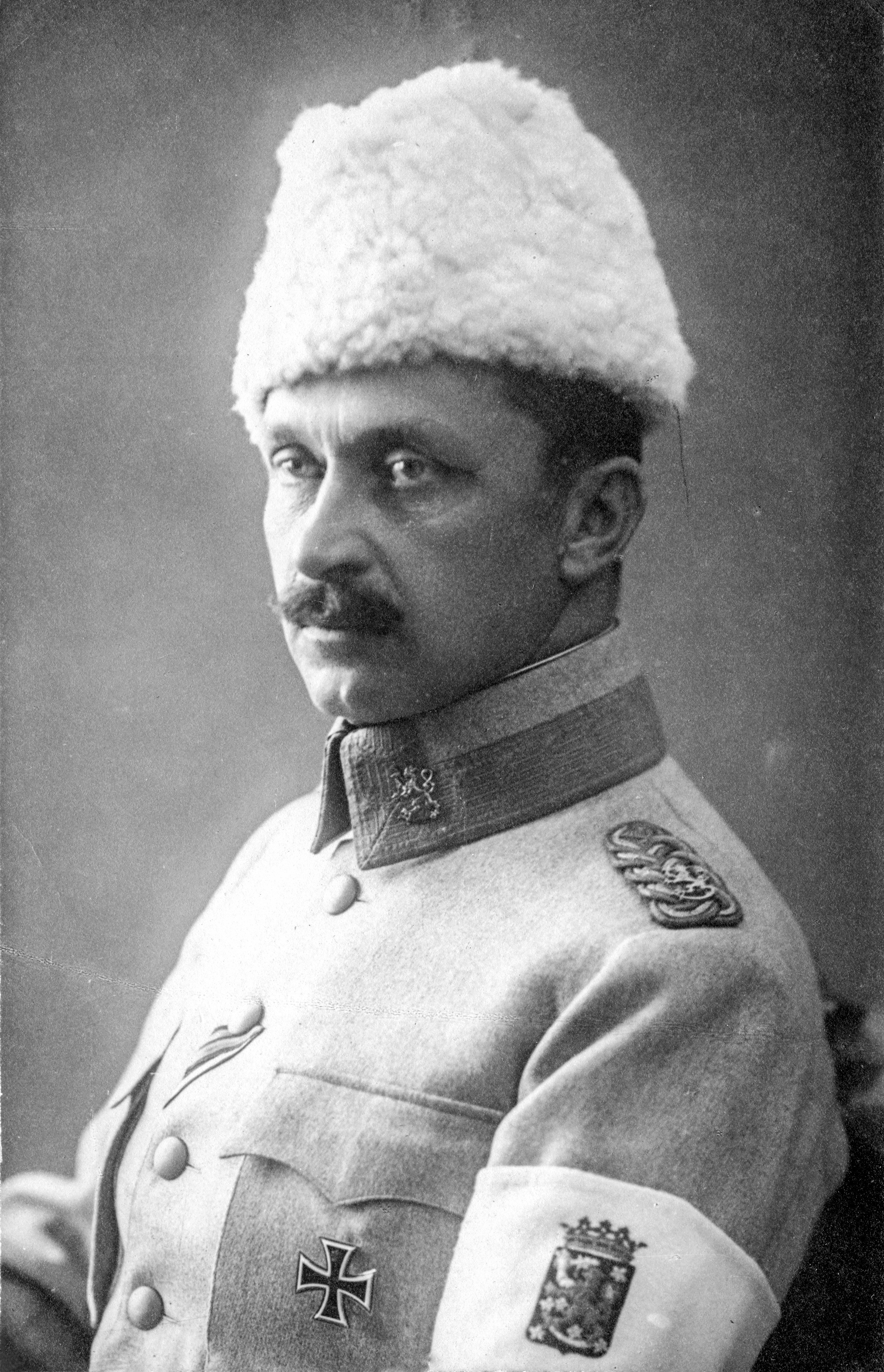
General C. G. E. Mannerheim in uniform with an armband showing the coat of arms of Finland

- United States Congress approved the Sedition Act, which extended the Espionage Act to cover a broader range of offenses including public speech or expression that cast the U.S. Government or its war effort in a negative light or interfered with its sale of war bonds.
- White Guard commander Carl Gustaf Emil Mannerheim held a victory parade in Helsinki to celebrate the end of the Finnish Civil War.
- The Imperial German Navy recommissioned the light cruiser Stuttgart as a seaplane tender, the only German seagoing aviation ship capable of working with the fleet commissioned during both world wars.
- The United States Army established the Third Corps to support Allied forces on the Western Front.
- The Ukrainian Socialist-Revolutionary Party split into two factions during its fourth congress.
- Ukrinform was established as the national news agency for Ukraine, with nationalist leader Dmytro Dontsov as its first director.
- Hazel Turner, a black farmer, was lynched by a white mob in Lowndes County, Georgia on suspicion for the shooting death of local farmer Hampton Smith, based on the assumption it was because of a public dispute between the two men. Turner's death was one of 13 black men killed by a vigilante mob on behalf of the Smith family.
- The Shenandoah National Forest was established in the Appalachian Mountains of the United States. It was renamed George Washington National Forest in 1932, with the Jefferson National Forest added to the preserve in 1936.
- Born: Wilf Mannion, English football player, inside forward for Middlesbrough from 1936 to 1954, and the England national football team from 1946 to 1951; as Wilfrid James Mannion, in South Bank, North Yorkshire, England (d. 2000)
- Died: Eusapia Palladino, 64, Italian spiritualist, best known for her séance demonstrations (b. 1854)

== May 17, 1918 (Friday) ==
- German submarine SM UC-35 was shelled and sunk in the Mediterranean Sea by a French Navy patrol ship with the loss of 20 of her 25 crew.
- The fraternity Pi Kappa Lambda was established at Northwestern University in Evanston, Illinois and became known as a music education fraternity.
- Japanese industrial paint manufacturer Kansai Paint was established in Amagasaki, Japan.
- The sports Club Atlético Banco de la Provincia de Buenos Aires was established in Vicente López, Argentina. It now has sections in field hockey, basketball, association football, gymnastics, golf, swimming, tennis, and martial arts.
- Born:
  - Birgit Nilsson, Swedish opera singer, best known for performances in Wagner operas for various companies including the Royal Swedish Opera; as Märta Birgit Nilsson, in Västra Karup, Sweden (d. 2005)
  - Robert Shields, American minister and teacher who became known for writing a diary of 37.5 million words, possibly the longest ever written; in Seymour, Indiana, United States (d. 2007)
- Died: William Drew Robeson, 73, American religious leader, minister of the black branch of the First Presbyterian Church of Princeton, father of singer and actor Paul Robeson (b. 1844)

== May 18, 1918 (Saturday) ==
- French Navy destroyer Catapulte collided with British cargo ship and sank in the Mediterranean Sea off Algeria.
- Royal Navy cargo ship SS Chesterfield, was torpedoed and sunk in the Mediterranean Sea by German submarine SM UC-52 with the loss of four of her crew.
- The British Indian Army established the 11th Gurkha Rifles for the Mesopotamian campaign.
- The football league Federação Gaúcha de Futebol was established to manage all football tournaments in Rio Grande do Sul, Brazil.
- The football club Ølstykke was established in Ølstykke, Denmark.
- Born: Tom Bolack, American politician, 20th Governor of New Mexico; as Thomas Felix Bolack, in Cowley County, Kansas, United States (d. 1998)
- Died: Toivo Kuula, 34, Finnish composer, known for works including Stabat mater and Ostrobothnian Suites (b. 1883)

== May 19, 1918 (Sunday) ==
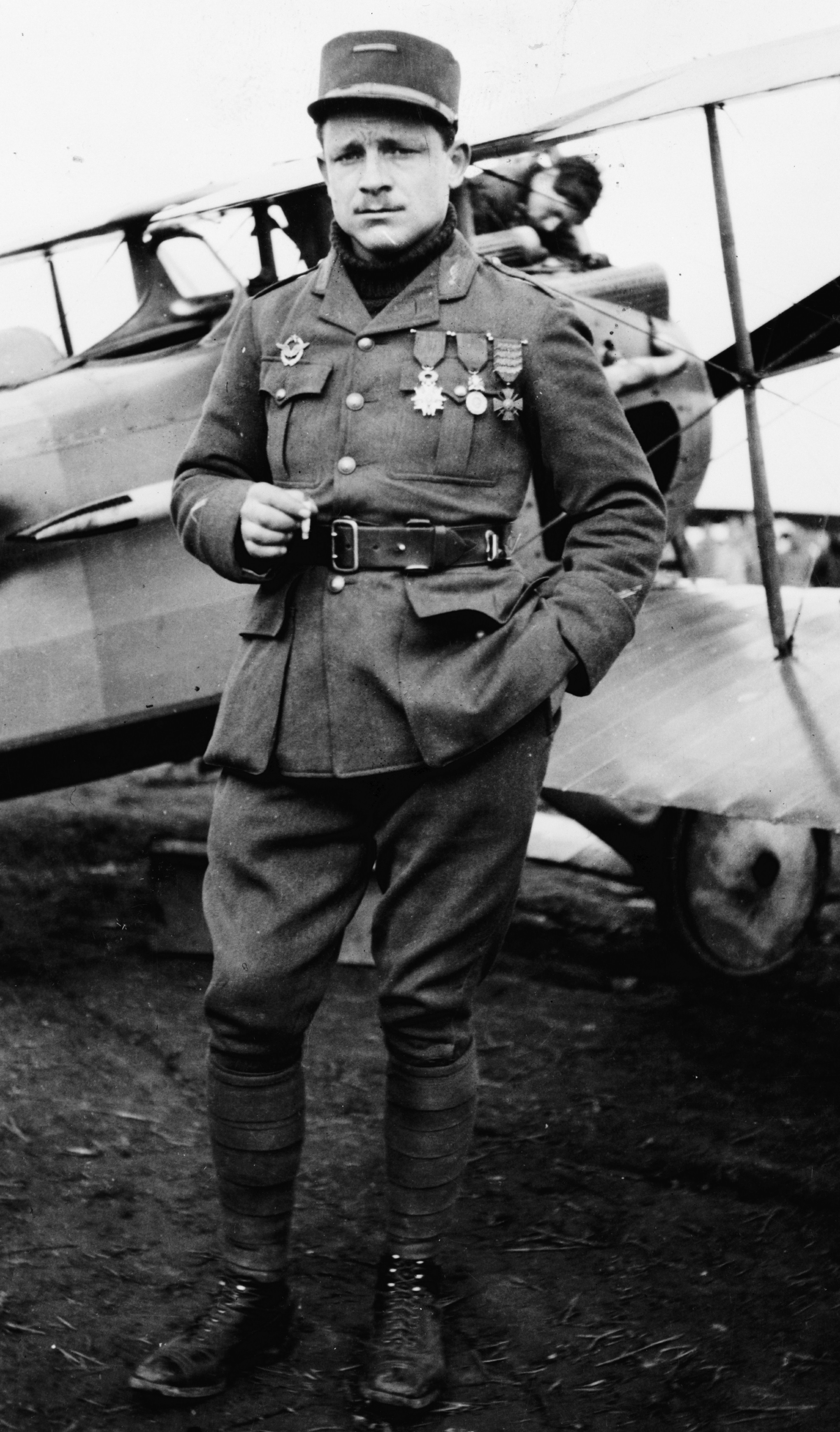
French flying ace Raoul Lufbery

- French flying ace Raoul Lufbery was killed when he fell from his plane during a dogfight with a German aircraft. He had 17 confirmed victories at the time of his death.
- Mary Turner, wife to Hazel Turner who was also pregnant, was lynched and burned to death by a white mob in Lowndes County, Georgia after speaking out against her husband's lynching three days earlier. Despite a state investigation that identified 15 suspects involved in the lynching, no charges were laid.
- U.S. Army Major Harold M. Clark Jr. and Sergeant Robert P. Gay make the first inter-island flight in Hawaii, flying from Fort Kamehameha on Oahu to Maui. They continued on to the island of Hawaii the same day, where they crashed on the slopes of Mauna Kea. Uninjured, they wandered on foot for a week before finding help.
- The film drama Old Wives for New, directed by Cecil B. DeMille, was released to controversy with its depiction of star Elliott Dexter actively seeking an adulterous affair. Despite the illicit material, the film became the fifth-highest grossing of the year. Copies of the film survive at the George Eastman Museum in Rochester, New York.
- Born:
  - Abraham Pais, Dutch-American physicist, known for collaborations with Niels Bohr and Albert Einstein; in Amsterdam, Netherlands (d. 2000)
  - Edward Blyden, Sierra Leone diplomat, ambassador to the United Nations, grandson of Edward Wilmot Blyden; in Freetown, Protectorate of Sierra Leone (present-day Sierra Leone) (d. 2010)
- Died:
  - Ferdinand Hodler, 65, Swiss painter, member of the Symbolism movement with works including Night (b. 1853)
  - George Bent, 75, Native American soldier, member of the Cheyenne nation who fought with the Confederates during the American Civil War, known for his collaborations with anthropologist George Bird Grinnell (b. 1843)

== May 20, 1918 (Monday) ==
- Germany launched the largest, and last, heavier-than-air raid against the United Kingdom of World War I, with 38 Gotha and three Riesenfkugzeug bombers participating. The bombers dropped 2,724 pounds (1,236 kg) of bombs according to British estimates or 1,500 kilograms (3,307 pounds) according to the Germans, killing 49 people, injuring 177, and inflicting £117,317 in damage. British fighters and antiaircraft guns shot down six Gothas, and a seventh was forced to land in England. Germany had made a total 27 heavier-than-air raids, dropping 111,935 kg (246,774 lbs) of bombs that killed total 835 people, injured 1,972, and inflicted £1,418,272 of damages in exchange for the loss of 62 bombers either shot down or crashed while returning to base.
- The small town of Codell, Kansas was hit for the third year in a row on the same date by a tornado, killing 10 people and damaging the town's school, Methodist church, hotel and several residencies. The third tornado proved to be the most damaging to the town's economy and it did not fully recover after the disaster.
- A special anti-conscription convention was held in Dublin, where leaders condemned the arrest and deportation of Sinn Féin leaders Éamon de Valera and Arthur Griffith for their alleged involvement in the "German Plot".
- The United States Army Aviation Section separated from Signal Corps and was divided into the Division of Military Aeronautics and the Bureau of Aircraft Production.
- Born:
  - Edward B. Lewis, American geneticist, recipient of the Nobel Prize in Physiology or Medicine for the development of evolutionary developmental biology; in Wilkes-Barre, Pennsylvania, United States (d. 2004)
  - David Ormsby-Gore, British diplomat, 36th Ambassador of the United Kingdom to the United States; as William David Ormsby-Gore, in London, England (d. 1985)
  - Piru Singh, Indian army officer, member of the Rajputana Rifles during the Indo-Pakistani War, recipient of the Param Vir Chakra; as Piru Singh Shekhawat, in Beri, British India (present-day India) (d. 1948, killed in action)

== May 21, 1918 (Tuesday) ==
- Battle of Sardarabad – An Ottoman army of 13,000 soldiers invaded Armenia by taking Sardarabad and advancing on the city of Yerevan.
- U.S. Navy patrol ship USS Christabel damaged German submarine SM UC-56 when it attempted to attack a British merchant ship it was escorting in the Atlantic Ocean off the coast of Spain.
- A fire destroyed an airplane manufacturing plant owned by Fowler Airplane Corporation in San Francisco, destroying 15 aircraft models and costing somewhere between $250,000 and $1 million in damages.
- Born:
  - Lloyd Hartman Elliott, American academic, president of George Washington University from 1965 to 1988; in Clay County, West Virginia, United States (d. 2013)
  - Robin McNair, British air force officer, commander of the No. 247, No. 74 Squadrons and No. 124 Wing during World War II, recipient of the Distinguished Flying Cross; in Rio de Janeiro, Brazil (d. 1996)
  - Karl Schwanzer, Austrian architect, designer of the 21er Haus and BMW Headquarters buildings; in Vienna, Austria-Hungary (present-day Austria) (d. 1975)

== May 22, 1918 (Wednesday) ==
- Battle of Sardarabad – The Armenian Army Corps of 9,000 men managed to force the Ottomans back to regroup at the Araks River.
- Battle of Abaran – An Armenian force of 1,000 riflemen halted the Ottoman advance towards Hamamlu at the Bash Abaran in Armenia.
- Axeman of New Orleans – Joseph Maggio, an Italian grocer in New Orleans, and his wife Catherine were murdered in their own home while sleeping. The killer cut both of their throats with a razor and bludgeoned them with an axe. Joseph survived long enough to be found by his brothers to report the attack. It set off a string of similar murders that terrorized the city until 1919 when the murder spree stopped. None of the serial murders have been solved.
- The Handley Page aircraft was first flown.
- Born:
  - Lude Check, Canadian ice hockey player, left winger for the Detroit Red Wings and Chicago Blackhawks from 1943 to 1951; as Ludic Albert Check, in Brandon, Manitoba, Canada (d. 2009)
  - John C. Haas, American business executive, chairman of Rohm and Haas from 1974 to 1978; in Haverford, Pennsylvania, United States (d. 2011)

== May 23, 1918 (Thursday) ==
- Costa Rica declared war on Germany.
- Royal Navy troopship RMS Moldavia was torpedoed and sunk in the English Channel by German submarine SM UB-57 with the loss of 56 lives.
- German submarine SM UB-52 was torpedoed and sunk in the Strait of Otranto by Royal Navy submarine HMS H4 with all hands lost.
- British passenger ship Innisfallen was torpedoed and sunk in the Irish Sea by German submarine SM UB-64 with the loss of 10 lives.
- The U.S. government approved the temporary assignment of U.S. air service cadets undergoing training to the Royal Italian Army's Military Aviation Corps so they could complete their tactical training with assignments to Italian bomber squadrons during combat operations, and with the right to transfer them to American units at any time.
- The Ukrainian Navy established its own infantry.
- Born:
  - Frank Mancuso, American major league baseball player and politician, catcher for the St. Louis Browns and Washington Senators from 1944 to 1947, member of Houston City Council from 1963 to 1994; in Houston, United States (d. 2007)
  - Walter Jackson Bate, American literary critic, recipient of the Pulitzer Prize for the biographies of John Keats in 1964 and Samuel Johnson in 1978; in Mankato, Minnesota, United States (d. 1999)
  - Denis Compton, English cricketer, batsman and bowler for Middlesex from 1936 to 1958, the Marylebone Cricket Club from 1936 to 1964 and the England cricket team from 1937 to 1957; in Hendon, England (d. 1997)
- Died:
  - Mariano Ponce, 55, Filipino politician, one of the founders of the news organization La Solidaridad (b. 1863)
  - Gerard Noel, 73, British naval officer, leading naval commander in the Second Anglo-Ashanti War, recipient of the Order of the Bath and Order of St Michael and St George (b. 1845)

== May 24, 1918 (Friday) ==
- Battle of Sardarabad – The Armenian Army Corps failed in their attempts to dislodge the Ottomans from their defensive positions around Araks River.
- Canadian women obtained the right to vote in federal elections. However, women identified as Status Indian were not given voting rights until 1960.
- U.S. President Woodrow Wilson issued an executive order to establish the United States Army Air Service to replace the Aviation Section of the U.S. Signal Corps. The Bureau of Aircraft Production and the Division of Military Aeronautics was also established to develop military aircraft for the new air force.
- The Red Air Fleet was established; the predecessor of the Soviet Air Forces.
- József Kiss, Austria-Hungary's fifth-highest-scoring ace, was shot down and killed in combat. He had scored 19 victories.
- The Confederación Sudamericana de Atletismo was established as the governing body for athletics in South America.
- Composer Béla Bartók premiered his opera Bluebeard's Castle at the Royal Hungarian Opera House in Budapest.
- The football club Piteå was established in Piteå, Sweden. Its women's division plays in Damallsvenskan, the highest women's association football league in Sweden, while the men's plays in Division 2.
- Born:
  - Peter J. Brennan, American public servant, 13th United States Secretary of Labor; in New York City, United States (d. 1996)
  - Jack Wrather, American business executive and television producer, known for classic 1950s television shows including The Lone Ranger, Sergeant Preston of the Yukon, and Lassie; as John Devereaux Wrather Jr., in Amarillo, Texas, United States (d. 1984)
  - Coleman Young, American politician, 66th Mayor of Detroit, first African American mayor of Detroit; in Tuscaloosa, Alabama, United States (d. 1997)

== May 25, 1918 (Saturday) ==
- Battle of Karakilisa – An Ottoman force of 10,000 soldiers marched on Karakilisa, Armenia where it met an Armenian force of 6,000 militia.
- Battle of Abaran – After three days of fierce fighting, the Armenians counterattacked Ottoman forces at the Bash Abaran in Armenia.
- The Ministry of Foreign Affairs was established for the Democratic Republic of Georgia.
- The Czechoslovak Communist Party was established in Moscow as a sort of government in exile until the Czechoslovak region gained independence from the Central Powers.
- James Joyce's Exiles: a play in three acts was published in London.
- Born: Fredrik Kayser, Norwegian army officer, member of the Norwegian Independent Company 1 during World War II, recipient of the St. Olav's Medal with Oak Branch, Military Medal and Legion of Honour (d. 2009)
- Died: William Pitt, 62, Australian architect, designer of major landmarks in Melbourne including the Queens Bridge (b. 1855)

== May 26, 1918 (Sunday) ==
- The Transcaucasian Democratic Federative Republic was abolished, allowing Georgia to declare its independence.
- German submarine SM UB-74 was depth charged and sunk in Lyme Bay by a Royal Navy ship, killing all 35 crew.
- The British built Kyarra was torpedoed and sunk one mile off Anvil Point, near Swanage, England by a UB-57 German submarine, killing 6 crew.

== May 27, 1918 (Monday) ==
- German spring offensive – German forces launched the third stage of their offensive against the Allies on the Western Front with Operation Blücher-Yorck, beginning with the attack on Aisne River in France. Taking advantage of thinly spread out defenses, the Germans advanced through a 40 km (25 mi) gap in the Allied line, punched through eight Allied divisions between Reims and Soissons, and gained another 15 km to the Vesle River by nightfall.
- Battle of Sardarabad – An Armenian force attacked the Ottoman Army from the rear while the main group pounded its front defenses, inflicting 3,500 casualties and forcing the Ottoman command to order a retreat.
- The Azerbaijani National Council was established as the governing body of Azerbaijan Democratic Republic.
- Born:
  - Yasuhiro Nakasone, Japanese state leader, 45th Prime Minister of Japan; in Takasaki, Empire of Japan (present-day Japan) (d. 2019)
  - Frank Balistrieri, American gangster, boss of the Milwaukee crime family from 1961 to 1983; in Milwaukee, United States (d. 1993)
- Died: Robert A. Little, 22, Australian air force officer, commander of the No. 208 and No. 203 Squadrons, recipient of the Distinguished Service Order, Distinguished Service Cross and Croix de guerre; killed in action (b. 1895)

== May 28, 1918 (Tuesday) ==
- Armenia and Azerbaijan both declared independence.
- Germany and Georgia signed a treaty at the Black Sea port of Poti, which was to guarantee Germany would protect Georgia's sovereignty from the growing Soviet Russia.
- Battle of Karakilisa – Ottoman forces failed to break out of Karakilisa, Armenia and subsequently retreated.
- Battle of Cantigny – The first military engagement for Americans occurred when the 1st Infantry Division attacked and captured the German-held village of Cantigny, France. American casualties were 1,603 while the Germans had 1,400 casualties and 250 captured.
- The Ministry of Foreign Affairs for the government of Azerbaijan was established.
- The city of Manteca, California was established.
- The sports club Ottestad was established in Ottestad, Norway. It now offers association football, handball, cross-country skiing and cycling.
- The film romantic comedy Bound in Morocco, starring Douglas Fairbanks and directed by Allan Dawn, was released through Famous Players–Lasky, becoming one of the top 10 grossing films of the year and the second hit for Fairbanks.
- Born:
  - Johnny Wayne, Canadian comedian, member of the popular comedic duo Wayne and Shuster; as Louis Weingarten, in Toronto, Canada (d. 1990)
  - John Birch, American army officer and missionary, recipient of the U.S. Army Distinguished Service Medal and two-time recipient of the Legion of Merit, namesake for the John Birch Society; in Landour, British India (present-day India) (d. 1945, killed in action)
  - John McKeithen, American politician, 49th Governor of Louisiana; in Grayson, Louisiana, United States (d. 1999)

== May 29, 1918 (Wednesday) ==
- Battle of Abaran – After two days of counterattacks, the Armenians inflicted enough heavy casualties on the Ottoman Army to force them back towards Hamamlu, Armenia.
- Battle of Skra-di-Legen – Greek forces supported by the French bombarded fortified Bulgarian positions at Skra, Greece.
- Born: Bert Corona, Mexican-American labor activist, leading member of the Congress of Industrial Organizations and the Chicano Movement in the 1960s; as Humberto Noé Corona (d. 2001)

== May 30, 1918 (Thursday) ==
- The Kuban Soviet Republic and Black Sea Soviet Republic merged into one Soviet republic.
- Third Battle of the Aisne – German forces advanced on Paris, capturing 50,000 Allied soldiers and over 800 guns.
- Battle of Skra-di-Legen – Greek forces captured the Bulgarian fort at Skra, Greece, taking 2,045 prisoners and inflicting 600 casualties. Allied casualties were 441 killed, 2,227 wounded and 164 missing.
- Birmingham College in Birmingham and Southern University in Greensboro, Alabama merged to become Birmingham–Southern College.
- The American Expeditionary Forces set up a second set of military hospitals in Châtel-Guyon, France, with Hospital No. 20 serving up to 2,000 wounded American soldiers.
- The movie house Rialto Theater opened to the public in Omaha, Nebraska.
- Born: Martin Lundström, Swedish Olympic cross-country skier, two-time gold medalist at the 1948 Winter Olympics and bronze medalist at the 1952 Winter Olympics; in Tvärliden, Sweden (d. 2016)
- Died:
  - Georgi Plekhanov, 61, Russian philosopher, one of the first philosophers to adopt Marxism (b. 1856)
  - Frederick Trump, 49, German-American business leader, founder of The Trump Organization, grandfather to Donald Trump (b. 1869)

== May 31, 1918 (Friday) ==
- U.S. Navy troopship USS President Lincoln was torpedoed and sunk in the Atlantic Ocean by German submarine SM U-90 with the loss of 26 of the 715 people on board. Survivors were rescued by fellow U.S. Navy ships USS Smith and USS Warrington.
- Royal Navy destroyer HMS Fairy rammed and sunk German submarine SM UC-75 in the North Sea but foundered herself and had to be abandoned.
- Czech nationalist leader Tomáš Masaryk led the signing of an agreement between Czech and Slovak expats in Pittsburgh to unite as one nation.
- Lieutenant General John Monash took command of the Australian Corps, the largest corps on the Western Front.
- American pilot Douglas Campbell scored his fifth victory, becoming the first ace from an American-trained unit.
- The football club Hebar Pazardzhik was established in Pazardzhik, Bulgaria.
- Born: Vilho Ylönen, Finnish shooter, silver medalist at the 1952 Summer Olympics and bronze medalist at the 1956 Summer Olympics; in Hankasalmi, Finland (d. 2000)
