= List of shipwrecks in May 1918 =

The list of shipwrecks in May 1918 includes ships sunk, foundered, grounded, or otherwise lost during May 1918.

== 1 May ==
List of shipwrecks: 1 May 1918
Ship	State	Description
HMS Blackmorevale	Royal Navy	World War I: The Hunt-class minesweeper struck a mine and sank in the North Sea off Tod Head, Aberdeenshire with the loss of 26 of her 74 crew.
City of Athens	United States	The steamer was sunk in a collision with Gloire (French Navy) in 110 feet (34 m) of water 20 miles (32 km) off the Delaware Capes in dense fog. 66 survivors were rescued by Gloire. 69 were killed, those passengers killed included two women, a child, 9 of 24 U.S. Marines and 6 of 20 French Navy sailors on board.
Era	Australia	World War I: The cargo ship was torpedoed and sunk in the Mediterranean Sea off Cape Ténès, Algeria (36°45′N 1°56′E) by SM U-32 (Imperial German Navy) with the loss of twelve crew.
Matiana	United Kingdom	World War I: The cargo ship was torpedoed and sunk in the Mediterranean Sea off Tunisia, Tunisia (37°15′N 10°05′E) by SM UC-27 (Imperial German Navy). Her crew survived.
Nikolaos	Greece	World War I: The sailing vessel was sunk in the Mediterranean Sea off the coast of Egypt (31°31′N 29°14′E) by SM UC-74 (Imperial German Navy).
Samsö	Denmark	World War I: The coaster struck a mine and sank in the North Sea 3 nautical miles (5.6 km) east by south of the Roker Lighthouse, County Durham, United Kingdom. Her crew survived.
San Nicola	Italy	World War I: The sailing vessel was sunk in the Mediterranean Sea (35°58′N 23°50′E) by SM U-27 (Austro-Hungarian Navy). Her crew survived.
Zavetni	Imperial Russian Navy	World War I: The Boiki-class destroyer was scuttled at Sevastopol.

== 2 May ==
List of shipwrecks: 2 May 1918
Ship	State	Description
HMT Antares II	Royal Navy	The naval trawler was lost on this date in the Mediterranean Sea.
Flawyl	United Kingdom	World War I: The cargo ship was torpedoed and sunk in the Mediterranean Sea 30 nautical miles (56 km) east south east of Pantelleria, Italy (36°41′N 12°42′E) by SM UB-52 (Imperial German Navy) with the loss of a crew member.
Franklyn	United Kingdom	World War I: The cargo ship was torpedoed and sunk in the Mediterranean Sea 65 nautical miles (120 km) east by north of Mahón, Spain (40°24′N 5°41′E) by SM UB-48 (Imperial German Navy). Her crew survived.
Girdleness	United Kingdom	World War I: The cargo ship was torpedoed and sunk in Bude Bay (50°54′N 4°41′W) by SM U-60 (Imperial German Navy) with the loss of two crew.
Medora	United Kingdom	World War I: The cargo ship was torpedoed and sunk in the Irish Sea 11 nautical miles (20 km) south west of the Mull of Galloway, Wigtownshire by SM U-86 (Imperial German Navy). Her crew survived, but three of them were taken as prisoners of war.
Thorsa	United Kingdom	World War I: The cargo ship was torpedoed and sunk in the Atlantic Ocean 3 nautical miles (5.6 km) north north west of the Pendeen Lighthouse, Cornwall (50°12′N 5°44′W) by SM UB-103 (Imperial German Navy). Her crew survived.
Tyler	United States	World War I: The cargo ship was torpedoed and sunk in the Mediterranean Sea 65 nautical miles (120 km) east by north of Mahón (40°24′N 5°41′E) by SM UB-48 (Imperial German Navy) with the loss of eleven of her crew.
SM UB-31	Imperial German Navy	World War I: The Type UB II submarine struck a mine and sank in the Strait of Dover (51°01′N 1°16′E) with the loss of all 22 crew.
SS Unity	United Kingdom	World War I: The cargo ship was torpedoed and sunk in the English Channel 9 nautical miles (17 km) south east of Folkestone, Kent by SM UB-57 (Imperial German Navy) with the loss of twelve of her crew.
Valdivia	France	World War I: The cargo ship was torpedoed and sunk in the Atlantic Ocean 45 nautical miles (83 km) south west of Cape Spartel, Morocco (35°07′N 6°30′W) by SM UB-70 (Imperial German Navy) with the loss of two of her crew.

== 3 May ==
List of shipwrecks: 3 May 1918
Ship	State	Description
SMS G9	Imperial German Navy	World War I: The V1-class destroyer struck a mine and sank in the North Sea with the loss of 31 of her crew.
Il Francesco	Italy	World War I: The sailing vessel was shelled and sunk in the Tyrrhenian Sea 8 nautical miles (15 km) east of Monte Santo, Sardinia (40°10′N 9°50′E) by SM UC-35 (Imperial German Navy).
Panaghia	Greece	World War I: The sailing vessel was sunk in the Mediterranean Sea (35°49′N 26°29′E) by SM U-27 (Austro-Hungarian Navy). Her crew survived.
Vasilefs Georgios	Greece	World War I: The cargo ship was torpedoed and sunk in the Atlantic Ocean 3 nautical miles (5.6 km) north east of Pendeen, Cornwall, United Kingdom (50°13′N 5°40′W) by SM UB-103 (Imperial German Navy).

== 4 May ==
List of shipwrecks: 4 May 1918
Ship	State	Description
SMS A71	Imperial German Navy	World War I: The A56-class torpedo boat struck a mine and sank in the North Sea with the loss of six of her crew.
Buffalo	United States	The 14-gross register ton motor sloop struck a reef in thick fog and darkness just north of Cape Resurrection (59°52′N 149°17′W) on the south-central coast of the Territory of Alaska. The only person aboard refloated her and beached her in shallow water to prevent her from sinking. He survived, but the surf wrecked Buffalo where she was beached. Her gasoline engine was salvaged, but otherwise she was a total loss.
Polbrae	United Kingdom	World War I: The cargo ship was torpedoed and sunk in the Atlantic Ocean 4.5 nautical miles (8.3 km) off Bude, Cornwall by SM U-60 (Imperial German Navy) with the loss of two crew.

== 5 May ==
List of shipwrecks: 5 May 1918
Ship	State	Description
Aghios Johannis	Greece	World War I: The sailing vessel was sunk in the Mediterranean Sea north of Crete by SM U-33 (Imperial German Navy).
Alberto Treves	Italy	World War I: The cargo ship was damaged in the Mediterranean Sea off Cartagena, Murcia, Spain by SM U-38 (Imperial German Navy) and was beached. She was subsequently refloated, repaired and returned to service.
Carrione	Italy	World War I: The sailing vessel was shelled and sunk in the Gulf of Genoa 5 nautical miles (9.3 km) west south west of the Capo Mele Lighthouse, Liguria (43°52′N 8°30′E) by SM UC-35 (Imperial German Navy).
HMS David Gillies	Royal Navy	The naval tug was lost in the Mediterranean Sea on this date.
SMS LM1	Imperial German Navy	The L1-class motor patrol boat was destroyed by a fire or explosion.
Petersham	United Kingdom	The cargo ship collided with another vessel and sank.
HMS Rhododendron	Royal Navy	World War I: The Anchusa-class sloop was sunk in the North Sea (59°33′N 2°50′W) by SM U-70 (Imperial German Navy) with the loss of fifteen of her 93 crew.
Sayeda	Egypt	World War I: The sailing vessel was sunk in the Mediterranean Sea off the coast of Egypt by SM UC-74 (Imperial German Navy).
Tommi	United Kingdom	World War I: The schooner was shelled and sunk in the Irish Sea between the Calf of Man and Chicken Rock, Isle of Man by SM U-86 (Imperial German Navy) with the loss of four of her crew.
SM UB-70	Imperial German Navy	World War I: The Type UB III submarine was last reported in the Mediterranean Sea east of Gibraltar. Subsequently lost with all 33 crew.
SM UB-119	Imperial German Navy	World War I: The Type UB III submarine was rammed and sunk in the Atlantic Ocean off Rathlin Island, County Donegal, United Kingdom (55°16′N 6°24′W) by Green Island (flag unknown) with the loss of all 34 crew.

== 6 May ==
List of shipwrecks: 6 May 1918
Ship	State	Description
Aghios Dimitrios	Greece	World War I: The sailing vessel was sunk in the Mediterranean Sea (35°42′N 25°25′E) by SM U-27 (Austro-Hungarian Navy). Her crew survived.
Evangelistria	Greece	World War I: The sailing vessel was sunk in the Mediterranean Sea (35°38′N 25°13′E) by SM U-27 (Austro-Hungarian Navy). Her crew survived.
Leeds City	United Kingdom	World War I: The cargo ship was torpedoed and sunk in the Irish Sea 5 nautical miles (9.3 km) east by south of the Skulmartin Lightship (United Kingdom) by SM U-86 (Imperial German Navy). Her crew survived.
Sandhurst	United Kingdom	World War I: The cargo ship was torpedoed and sunk in the Irish Sea 6 nautical miles (11 km) north west by west of Corsewall Point, Wigtownshire (54°58′N 5°25′W) by SM UB-72 (Imperial German Navy) with the loss of twenty of her crew.
Taxiarchis	Greece	World War I: The sailing vessel was sunk in the Mediterranean Sea (35°38′N 25°13′E) by SM U-27 (Austro-Hungarian Navy). Her crew survived.

== 7 May ==
List of shipwrecks: 7 May 1918
Ship	State	Description
HM CMB-10	Royal Navy	The Coastal Motor Boat was lost on this date.
SMS M49	Imperial German Navy	World War I: The Type 1915 minesweeper struck a mine and sank in the North Sea.
Nantes	United Kingdom	World War I: The cargo ship was torpedoed and sunk in the North Sea 83 nautical miles (154 km) east south east of Fair Isle by SM U-105 (Imperial German Navy). Her crew survived.
Saxon	United Kingdom	World War I: The cargo ship was torpedoed and sunk in the North Sea 83 nautical miles (154 km) east south east of Fair Isle by SM U-105 (Imperial German Navy) with the loss of 22 crew.

== 8 May ==
List of shipwrecks: 8 May 1918
Ship	State	Description
Constantia	United Kingdom	World War I: The coaster was torpedoed and sunk in the North Sea 2 nautical miles (3.7 km) off Robin Hood's Bay, Yorkshire by SM UB-21 (Imperial German Navy) with the loss of three of her crew.
Dux	United Kingdom	World War I: The cargo ship was torpedoed and sunk in the Atlantic Ocean 7 nautical miles (13 km) north west of the Godrevy Lighthouse, Cornwall (50°16′N 5°32′W) by SM U-54 (Imperial German Navy). Her crew survived.
Ingleside	United Kingdom	World War I: The cargo ship was torpedoed and sunk in the Mediterranean Sea 80 nautical miles (150 km) off Algiers, Algeria by SM U-38 (Imperial German Navy) with the loss of eleven crew.
Princess Dagmar	United Kingdom	World War I: The coaster was torpedoed and sunk in the Bristol Channel by SM U-54 (Imperial German Navy) with the loss of all 24 crew.
S. R. Kirby	United States	The cargo ship was struck by a huge wave, or ran aground on a reef, broke in two and sank in Keweenaw Bay. 20 of 24 crew died. One crewman was rescued by Berwind, two by Block and one by the barge Hartnell (all flag unknown). The wreck was discovered in 2018 and confirmed in 2020.
Thoralf	Denmark	World War I: The barque was scuttled in the Irish Sea 20 nautical miles (37 km) south east of the Coningbeg Lightship (United Kingdom) (51°56′N 5°55′W) by SM UB-65 (Imperial German Navy). Her crew survived.
SM U-32	Imperial German Navy	World War I: The Type U 31 submarine was depth charged and sunk in the Mediterranean Sea north west of Malta (36°07′N 13°28′E) by HMS Wildflower (Royal Navy) with the loss of all 41 crew.

== 9 May ==
List of shipwrecks: 9 May 1918
Ship	State	Description
Baron Ailsa	United Kingdom	World War I: The collier was torpedoed and sunk in the Irish Sea 18 nautical miles (33 km) west north west of the Smalls Lighthouse by SM UB-72 (Imperial German Navy) with the loss of ten of her crew.
Deipara	Italy	World War I: The cargo ship was sunk in the Mediterranean Sea off Cape Camarat, Var, France by SM UC-35 (Imperial German Navy) with the loss of eight of her crew.
Enrichetta	Italy	World War I: The cargo ship was sunk in the Atlantic Ocean (35°29′N 12°22′W) by SM U-153 (Imperial German Navy). Her crew survived.
SM UC-78	Imperial German Navy	World War I: The Type UC II submarine was rammed and sunk in the English Channel off Cherbourg, Manche, France by Queen Alexandra (United Kingdom).

== 10 May ==
List of shipwrecks: 10 May 1918
Ship	State	Description
Amplegarth	United Kingdom	World War I: The cargo ship struck a mine and sank in the English Channel 1 nautical mile (1.9 km) west south west of Dover, Kent. Her crew survived.
Anboto Mendi	Spain	World War I: The cargo ship was sunk in the North Sea off Robin Hood's Bay, Yorkshire, United Kingdom by SM UB-21 (Imperial German Navy).
Erich Lea	Norway	World War I: The cargo ship was sunk in the North Sea 6 nautical miles (11 km) south east of Whitby, Yorkshire by SM UB-107 (Imperial German Navy). Her crew survived.
Itinda	United Kingdom	World War I: The cargo ship was torpedoed and sunk in the Mediterranean Sea 40 nautical miles (74 km) north of Matra Susa, Libya (32°24′N 21°48′E) by SM U-47 (Austro-Hungarian Navy) with the loss of a crew member.
HMML 254	Royal Navy	The motor launch was lost on this date.
Szechuen	United Kingdom	World War I: The cargo ship was torpedoed and sunk in the Mediterranean Sea 60 nautical miles (110 km) north by east of Port Said, Egypt (32°00′N 32°46′E) by SM UB-51 (Imperial German Navy) with the loss of nine of her crew.
SM UB-16	Imperial German Navy	World War I: The Type UB I submarine was torpedoed and sunk in the North Sea off Harwich, Essex, United Kingdom (52°06′N 2°01′E) by HMS E34 (Royal Navy) with the loss of thirteen of her fourteen crew.
HMS Vindictive	Royal Navy	World War I: Second Ostend Raid: The Arrogant-class cruiser was sunk as a blockship at Ostend, West Flanders, Belgium.
Wileysike	United Kingdom	World War I: The cargo ship was torpedoed and sunk in St. George's Channel 8 nautical miles (15 km) off St. Ann's Head, Pembrokeshire by SM U-54 (Imperial German Navy) with the loss of four crew.

== 11 May ==
List of shipwrecks: 11 May 1918
Ship	State	Description
Agnes	Sweden	The steam trawler struck a mine while fishing in the North Sea, west of Vinga Lighthouse. Two survivors, eight casualties.
Clan Mackay	United Kingdom	The 6,580 GRT Clan Line vessel was in collision with an unnamed vessel in the Bay of Biscay and sank.
Gigilla	Italy	World War I: The sailing vessel was sunk in the Strait of Messina by SM UC-52 (Imperial German Navy).
Gothia	Sweden	World War I: The cargo ship was sunk in the North Sea eight nautical miles (15 km) north east of Hartlepool, County Durham, United Kingdom by SM UB-21 (Imperial German Navy). Her crew survived.
HMT Holly III	Royal Navy	The naval trawler was lost on this date.
Liberty	United States	The Schooner barge, under tow of Ontario (United States), foundered two miles (3.2 km) off the Vineyard Sound lightvessel. Four crew died.
Massouda	United Kingdom	World War I: The sailing vessel was scuttled in the Mediterranean Sea 50 nautical miles (93 km) north of Marsa Matruh, Egypt by an enemy submarine.
Michail	Russia	World War I: The fishing vessel was sunk in the Arctic Ocean eight nautical miles (15 km) east north east of Svyatoy Nos by SM U-22 (Imperial German Navy). Her crew survived.
Pilgrim	United States	The schooner Barge sank off Vineyard Haven, Massachusetts in Vineyard Sound. She broke up before salvage could be attempted.
San Andres	Norway	World War I: The cargo ship was sunk in the Irish Sea 100 nautical miles (190 km) west of Lundy Island, Devon, United Kingdom (51°23′N 7°53′W) by SM U-86 (Imperial German Navy) with the loss of two of her crew.
Sant Anna	French Navy	World War I: The troopship was sunk in the Mediterranean Sea south of Pantelleria, Italy (37°04′N 11°36′E) by SM UC-54 (Imperial German Navy) with the loss of 605 lives.
Suzette Fraissinet	France	World War I: The cargo ship was sunk in the Mediterranean Sea 37 nautical miles (69 km) south of Cape Spartivento, Italy by SM UB-52 (Imperial German Navy). Her crew survived.
SM U-154	Imperial German Navy	World War I: The Type U 151 submarine was torpedoed and sunk in the Atlantic Ocean (36°51′N 11°50′W) by HMS E35 (Royal Navy) with the loss of all 77 crew.
Verona	Italy	World War I: The troopship was sunk in the Strait of Messina (37°04′N 16°19′E) by SM UC-52 (Imperial German Navy) with the loss of 880 lives.

== 12 May ==
List of shipwrecks: 12 May 1918
Ship	State	Description
Haslingden	United Kingdom	World War I: The cargo ship was torpedoed and sunk in the North Sea 7 nautical miles (13 km) off Seaham, County Durham by SM UB-21 (Imperial German Navy) with the loss of eleven of her crew.
Inniscarra	United Kingdom	World War I: The passenger ship was torpedoed and sunk in the Atlantic Ocean 10 nautical miles (19 km) south east of Ballycottin Island, County Cork by SM U-86 (Imperial German Navy) with the loss of 28 of her crew.
Kong Raud	Norway	World War I: The trawler was sunk in the Barents Sea 32 nautical miles (59 km) north east of Svyatoy Nos, Russia by SM U-22 (Imperial German Navy). Her crew survived.
Omrah	United Kingdom	World War I: The passenger ship was torpedoed and sunk in the Mediterranean Sea 40 nautical miles (74 km) south by west of Cape Spartivento, Sicily, Italy by SM UB-52 (Imperial German Navy) with the loss of a crew member.
Pax	France	World War I: The coaster was torpedoed and sunk in the Mediterranean Sea 7 nautical miles (13 km) off Cape Camarat, Var 43°08′N 6°42′E by SM UC-35 (Imperial German Navy) with the loss of fifteen of her crew.
Tennes	Norway	World War I: The trawler was sunk in the Barents Sea 20 nautical miles (37 km) north east of Svyatoy Nos by SM U-22 (Imperial German Navy).
Togo	Italy	World War I: The cargo ship was torpedoed and sunk in the Mediterranean Sea (43°10′N 6°36′E) by SM UC-35 (Imperial German Navy) with the loss of a crew member.
SM U-103	Imperial German Navy	World War I: The Type U 57 submarine was rammed and sunk in the Atlantic Ocean (49°16′N 4°51′W) by Olympic (United Kingdom) with the loss of nine of her 40 crew. Survivors were rescued by USS Davis (United States Navy).
SM UB-72	Imperial German Navy	World War I: The Type UB III submarine was depth charged and sunk in the English Channel (50°08′N 2°41′W) by HMS D4 (Royal Navy) with the loss of 34 of her crew.
Vea	Norway	World War I: The trawler was sunk in the Barents Sea 20 nautical miles (37 km) east north east of Svyatoy Nos by SM U-22 (Imperial German Navy). Her crew survived.
Vimiera	United Kingdom	World War I: The cargo ship was torpedoed and sunk in the Mediterranean Sea 16 nautical miles (30 km) west south west of Lampedusa, Italy (35°23′N 12°19′E) by SM UC-54 (Imperial German Navy). Her crew survived.

== 13 May ==
List of shipwrecks: 13 May 1918
Ship	State	Description
HMT Balfour	Royal Navy	The naval trawler collided with Nidd (United Kingdom) and sank in the English Channel 5 nautical miles (9.3 km) west south west of the Royal Sovereign Lightship (United Kingdom). Her crew were rescued by Nidd.
Esperanza de Larrinaga	United Kingdom	World War I: The cargo ship was torpedoed and damaged in the Irish Sea (55°49′N 7°25′W) by SM UB-65 (Imperial German Navy) with the loss of a crew member. She was beached in Lough Swilly.
GGSY#4	United States	The 29-ton scow sank without loss of life during a gale in the Gulf of Alaska 140 nautical miles (260 km; 160 mi) west of Cape Spencer, Territory of Alaska.
Julia	Greece	World War I: The sailing vessel was sunk in the Mediterranean Sea (36°35′N 22°10′E) by SM U-32 (Austro-Hungarian Navy). Her crew survived.
Kabeljau	Imperial German Navy	World War I: The Kabeljau-class Vorpostenboot was sunk by mines west of Sylt.
HMT Loch Naver	Royal Navy	World War I: The naval trawler struck a mine and sank in the Aegean Sea (37°50′N 24°26′E) with the loss of thirteen of her crew.
SM UB-114	Imperial German Navy	The Type UB III submarine sank at Kiel, Schleswig-Holstein with the loss of seven of her crew. She was later raised.
USS Zaanland	United States Navy	The cargo ship was rammed and sunk in the Atlantic Ocean west of France by USS Hisko (United States Navy). Her crew were rescued by Munalbro (United States).

== 14 May ==
List of shipwrecks: 14 May 1918
Ship	State	Description
SMS A72	Imperial German Navy	World War I: The A56-class torpedo boat struck a mine and sank in the North Sea with the loss of 25 of her crew.
Embla	Denmark	World War I: The schooner was scuttled in the North Sea south west of Skudesneshavn, Rogaland, Norway (57°45′N 3°30′E) by SM U-101 (Imperial German Navy). Her crew survived.
Neches	United States	The steamer was sunk in a collision with a Royal Navy vessel 10 miles (16 km) from Start Point, Devon and 30 miles (48 km) east of Plymouth, England. Three crew were killed.
HMS Phoenix	Royal Navy	HMS Phoenix World War I: The Acheron-class destroyer was torpedoed and sunk in the Adriatic Sea off Vlorë, Albania by SM U-27 (Austro-Hungarian Navy) with the loss of two of her 72 crew.
Ruth	Sweden	World War I: The steam trawler struck a mine while fishing in the North Sea, southwest of Marstrand. All four crew perished.
Stairs	Norway	World War I: The trawler was sunk in the Barents Sea 10 nautical miles (19 km) north of Vaidaguada, Russia by SM U-22 (Imperial German Navy).
Woolston	United Kingdom	World War I: The cargo ship was torpedoed and sunk in the Mediterranean Sea 1.5 nautical miles (2.8 km) off Syracuse, Sicily, Italy (37°30′N 12°20′E) by SM UC-52 (Imperial German Navy) with the loss of nineteen of her crew.

== 15 May ==
List of shipwrecks: 15 May 1918
Ship	State	Description
J. H. Rutter	United States	The sail Barge sank near the dock of the Newport Coal Company, Newport, Rhode Island. Raised and returned to service.
Villa de Soller	Spain	World War I: The coaster was sunk in the Mediterranean Sea off Hyères, Var, France by SM UC-35 (Imperial German Navy). Her crew survived.
War Grange	United Kingdom	World War I: The cargo ship was torpedoed and damaged in the Atlantic Ocean 7 nautical miles (13 km) off Town Head, Cornwall (50°28′N 5°07′W) by SM U-55 (Imperial German Navy) with the loss of five crew. She was beached at Newquay but was later salvaged.

== 16 May ==
List of shipwrecks: 16 May 1918
Ship	State	Description
Direktor Schauseil	Imperial German Navy	World War I: The Neuwerk-class Vorpostenboot was sunk by mines in the North Sea.
Fyedor Chizhov	Russia	World War I: The coaster was sunk in the Barents Sea off Vaidaguada by SM U-22 (Imperial German Navy).
Heron Bridge	United Kingdom	World War I: The collier was torpedoed and sunk in the Atlantic Ocean 320 nautical miles (590 km) east by north of São Miguel Island, Azores, Portugal (38°49′N 18°26′W) by SM U-62 (Imperial German Navy) with the loss of a crew member.
Llancarvan	United Kingdom	World War I: The cargo ship was torpedoed and sunk in the Atlantic Ocean 370 nautical miles (690 km) east of São Miguel Island (38°24′N 17°18′W) by SM U-62 (Imperial German Navy). Her crew survived.
Mansoura	France	World War I: The sailing vessel was sunk in the Mediterranean Sea north of Port Said, Egypt (32°15′N 31°35′E) by SM UB-51 (Imperial German Navy).
Marie Frédérique	French Navy	World War I: The naval trawler struck a mine and sank in the Mediterranean Sea north of Cap de Garde, Algeria (37°02′N 7°52′E) with the loss of eighteen of her crew.
Polarstrømmen	Norway	World War I: The trawler was sunk in the Barents Sea 6 nautical miles (11 km) north of Vaidaguada, by SM U-22 (Imperial German Navy). Her crew survived.
HMT Silvery Harvest	Royal Navy	The naval trawler collided with another vessel and sank in the English Channel off Berry Head, Devon with some loss of life.
Tagona	Canada	World War I: The cargo ship was torpedoed and sunk in the Atlantic Ocean 5 nautical miles (9.3 km) west south west of Trevose Head, Cornwall, United Kingdom 50°29′N 5°07′W) by SM U-55 (Imperial German Navy) with the loss of eight crew.
Tartary	United Kingdom	World War I: The cargo ship was torpedoed and sunk in the Irish Sea 8 nautical miles (15 km) east north east of the Skulmartin Lightship (United Kingdom) by SM U-86 (Imperial German Navy). Her crew survived.
Yturri Bide	Spain	World War I: The coaster was sunk in the Atlantic Ocean north east of the Tuskar Rock, Ireland (52°27′N 5°35′W) by SM UB-118 (Imperial German Navy).

== 17 May ==
List of shipwrecks: 17 May 1918
Ship	State	Description
Mavisbrook	United Kingdom	World War I: The collier was torpedoed and sunk in the Mediterranean Sea 50 nautical miles (93 km) south east by south of Cabo de Gata, Andalusia, Spain (36°05′N 1°35′W) by SM UB-50 (Imperial German Navy) with the loss of eighteen crew.
Motricine	France	World War I: The tanker was sunk in the Atlantic Ocean 72 nautical miles (133 km) north east of Ouessant, Finistère (49°19′N 7°29′W) by SM U-55 (Imperial German Navy). Her captain was taken as a prisoner of war.
Pietro Brizzolari	Italy	World War I: The sailing vessel was sunk in the Strait of Messina by SM UC-52 (Imperial German Navy).
Sculptor	United Kingdom	World War I: Convoy GB 35: The cargo ship was torpedoed and damaged in the Mediterranean Sea 60 nautical miles (110 km) north west of Oran, Algeria by SM U-39 (Imperial German Navy). She was beached at Mers-el-Kebir, Libya The bow section of the ship was destroyed by an explosion during salvage operations and she was abandoned as a total loss.
SM UC-35	Imperial German Navy	World War I: The Type UC II submarine was shelled and sunk in the Mediterranean Sea south west of Sardinia, Italy (39°48′N 7°42′E) by Ailly (French Navy) with the loss of twenty of her 25 crew.

== 18 May ==
List of shipwrecks: 18 May 1918
Ship	State	Description
Catapulte	French Navy	The Arquebuse-class destroyer collided with Warrimoo (United Kingdom) and sank in the Mediterranean Sea off Bône, Algeria.
HMS Chesterfield	Royal Navy	World War I: The fleet messenger was torpedoed and sunk in the Mediterranean Sea 42 nautical miles (78 km) north east by east of Malta (36°17′N 15°13′E) by SM UC-52 (Imperial German Navy) with the loss of four of her crew.
Denbigh Hall	United Kingdom	World War I: The cargo ship was torpedoed and sunk in the Atlantic Ocean 90 nautical miles (170 km)) west south west of the Bishop Rock, Isles of Scilly (49°00′N 8°02′W) by SM U-55 (Imperial German Navy). Her crew survived.
Hurunui	United Kingdom	World War I: The cargo ship was torpedoed and sunk in the English Channel 48 nautical miles (89 km) south by east of The Lizard, Cornwall (49°08′N 5°00′W) by SM U-94 (Imperial German Navy) with the loss of a crew member.
John G. Mccullough	United States	World War I: The cargo ship was torpedoed and sunk in the Bay of Biscay 8 nautical miles (15 km) south of the Île d'Yeu (46°35′N 2°16′W) by SM UB-74 (Imperial German Navy) with the loss of a crew member.
Mabrouka	France	World War I: The 25-ton sailing vessel was sunk in the Mediterranean Sea north of Port Said, Egypt by SM UB-51 (Imperial German Navy).
Mabrouka	France	World War I: The 25-ton sailing vessel was sunk in the Mediterranean Sea north of Port Said by SM UB-51 (Imperial German Navy).
Maria	France	World War I: The sailing vessel was sunk in the Mediterranean Sea north of Port Said by SM UB-51 (Imperial German Navy).
Menewar	France	World War I: The sailing vessel was sunk in the Mediterranean Sea by SM UB-51 (Imperial German Navy).
Ninetta	Italy	World War I: The sailing vessel was shelled and sunk in the Mediterranean Sea 22 nautical miles (41 km) south east by south of Cape Passero, Sicily by SM UC-52 (Imperial German Navy).
Scholar	United Kingdom	World War I: The cargo ship was torpedoed and sunk in the Atlantic Ocean 90 nautical miles (170 km) west south west of the Bishop Rock (48°53′N 8°04′W) by SM U-55 (Imperial German Navy) with the loss of two crew.
Tewfig el Bari	France	World War I: The sailing vessel was sunk in the Mediterranean Sea by SM UB-51 (Imperial German Navy).
USS William Rockefeller	United States Navy	World War I: The tanker was sunk in the North Sea off Kinnaird Head, Aberdeenshire, United Kingdom (57°44′N 1°23′W) by SM UC-58 (Imperial German Navy) with the loss of three of her crew. Forty eight survivors rescued by HMT Princess Marie (Royal Navy) and tug "William Poulson" (United Kingdom).

== 19 May ==
List of shipwrecks: 19 May 1918
Ship	State	Description
Forsøk	Norway	World War I: The trawler was sunk in the Barents Sea south west of Cape Kanin Nos Russia by SM U-22 (Imperial German Navy). Her crew survived.
Kirstin Jensen	Denmark	World War I: The schooner was shelled and sunk in the Mediterranean Sea 40 nautical miles (74 km) off Cape Palos, Murcia, Spain by SM UB-50 (Imperial German Navy). Her crew survived.
Snowdon	United Kingdom	World War I: The collier was torpedoed and sunk in the Mediterranean Sea 84 nautical miles (156 km) south of Malta by SM U-63 (Imperial German Navy) with the loss of two crew.
Tacoma	United States	With 151 salmon cannery employees, a crew of 21, and a cargo of 1,373 tons of salmon cannery supplies on board, the 1,738-gross register ton, 222.2-foot (67.7 m) ship was crushed by ice and sank in Bristol Bay off the coast of the Territory of Alaska at 57°53′N 158°04′W. All on board survived.
Water Witch	United Kingdom	The schooner ran aground in the Strait of Gibraltar and sank.

== 20 May ==
List of shipwrecks: 20 May 1918
Ship	State	Description
Agios Dionysios	Greece	World War I: The sailing vessel was sunk in the Mediterranean Sea (36°39′N 22°18′E) by SM U-32 (Austro-Hungarian Navy). Her crew survived.
Angeliki	Greece	World War I: The sailing vessel was sunk in the Mediterranean Sea (36°39′N 22°18′E) by SM U-32 (Austro-Hungarian Navy). Her crew survived.
Khariton Leptev	Russia	World War I: The auxiliary brigantine was sunk in the Barents Sea off Murmansk by SM U-22 (Imperial German Navy).
New Sweden	Sweden	World War I: Convoy GaG 24: The cargo ship was sunk in the Mediterranean Sea 20 nautical miles (37 km) off the Sabinal Lighthouse, Spain (36°24′N 2°40′W) by SM UB-50 (Imperial German Navy). Her crew survived.

== 21 May ==
List of shipwrecks: 21 May 1918
Ship	State	Description
Chatham	United Kingdom	World War I: The cargo ship was torpedoed and sunk in the Mediterranean Sea 80 nautical miles (150 km) south west of Cape Matapan, Greece (34°51′N 21°34′E) by SM U-32 (Austro-Hungarian Navy). Her crew survived.
Rosalind	Sweden	World War I: The cargo ship hit a mine and sank in the Baltic Sea 35 nautical miles (65 km) south east of Stockholm, Sweden.

== 22 May ==
List of shipwrecks: 22 May 1918
Ship	State	Description
Meran	Norway	World War I: The sailing vessel was sunk in the North Sea off Songvår, Vest-Agder by SM U-86 (Imperial German Navy). Her crew survived.
Red Rose	United Kingdom	World War I: The coaster was sunk in the English Channel approximately 30 nautical miles (56 km) north of Cap d'Antifer, Seine-Inférieure, France (50°04′N 0°20′W) by SM UB-57 (Imperial German Navy) with the loss of eleven of her crew.
USS Wakiva II	United States Navy	The armed yacht/patrol vessel sank in a collision with USS Wabash (United States Navy) 20 miles (32 km) south of Île d'Yeu, France in the Bay of Biscay. Two killed.

== 23 May ==
List of shipwrecks: 23 May 1918
Ship	State	Description
SMS Direktor Schwarz	Imperial German Navy	The Vorpostenboot was lost on this date.
Innisfallen	United Kingdom	World War I: The passenger ship was torpedoed and sunk in the Irish Sea 16 nautical miles (30 km) east by north of the Kish Lightship (United Kingdom) (53°26′N 5°21′W) by SM UB-64 (Imperial German Navy) with the loss of ten lives.
Mefjord	Norway	World War I: The coaster was torpedoed and sunk in the Atlantic Ocean off Trevose Head, Cornwall, United Kingdom (50°28′N 5°11′W) by SM UC-64 (Imperial German Navy). Her crew survived.
HMS Moldavia	Royal Navy	World War I: The armed merchant cruiser, operating as a troopship, was torpedoed and sunk in the English Channel off Beachy Head, Sussex (50°24′N 0°26′W) by SM UB-57 (Imperial German Navy) with the loss of 56 lives.
Skaraas	United Kingdom	World War I: The cargo ship was torpedoed and sunk in the Atlantic Ocean 1 nautical mile (1.9 km) off Black Head, Cornwall (49°59′N 5°06′W) by SM UB-74 (Imperial German Navy) with the loss of nineteen of her crew.
SM UB-52	Imperial German Navy	World War I: The Type UB III submarine was torpedoed and sunk in the Strait of Otranto (41°36′N 18°52′E) by HMS H4 (Royal Navy) with the loss of 32 of her 34 crew.

== 24 May ==
List of shipwrecks: 24 May 1918
Ship	State	Description
HMT Gabir	Royal Navy	World War I: The naval trawler struck a mine and sank in the North Sea of Pakefield, Suffolk with the loss of two of her crew.
Ruth Hickman	United Kingdom	World War I: The schooner was scuttled in the Atlantic Ocean 60 nautical miles (110 km) north north west of Graciosa, Azores, Portugal (40°05′N 28°30′W) by SM U-62 (Imperial German Navy). Her crew survived.
HMT Yucca	Royal Navy	World War I: The naval trawler struck a mine and sank in the North Sea off Pakefield (52°26′N 1°48′E) with the loss of seven of her crew. by SM UC-17 (Imperial German Navy). Her crew survived.

== 25 May ==
List of shipwrecks: 25 May 1918
Ship	State	Description
Amiral Lafont	France	World War I: The auxiliary sailing vessel was sunk in the Mediterranean Sea north of the Isla de Alborán, Spain (36°31′N 2°27′W) by SM UB-50 (Imperial German Navy).
Edna	United States	World War I: The schooner was captured by SM U-151 (Imperial German Navy) 18–20 miles (29–32 km) south east of the Winter Quarter Lightship and was scuttled. The crew was released unharmed on 5 June.
Hattie Dunn	United States	World War I: The three-masted schooner was scuttled in the Atlantic Ocean (37°40′N 74°58′W) by SM U-151 (Imperial German Navy). Her crew survived.
Hauppauge	United States	World War I: The schooner was captured by SM U-151 (Imperial German Navy) off Maryland. A scuttling attempt caused her to capsize. She was towed in capsized, later righted and repaired.
Santa Teresa	Italy	World War I: The sailing vessel was scuttled in the Mediterranean Sea north of the Isla de Alborán (36°30′N 2°43′W) by SM UB-50 (Imperial German Navy).
Saphir	Norway	World War I: The cargo ship was torpedoed and sunk in the Atlantic Ocean 1.5 nautical miles (2.8 km) north north west of Trevose Head, Cornwall, United Kingdom by SM U-94 (Imperial German Navy). Her crew survived.

== 26 May ==
List of shipwrecks: 26 May 1918
Ship	State	Description
Kyarra	United Kingdom	World War I: The cargo liner was torpedoed and sunk in the English Channel off Swanage, Dorset by SM UB-57 (Imperial German Navy) with the loss of six crew.
HMT Clara & Alice	Royal Navy	The naval trawler was lost on this date.
Dayspring	United Kingdom	World War I: The fishing smack was shelled andsunk in the North Sea off the coast of Norfolk by SM UB-40 (Imperial German Navy). Her crew survived.
Eclipse	United Kingdom	World War I: The fishing smack was shelled and sunk in the North Sea off the coast of Norfolk by SM UB-40 (Imperial German Navy). Her crew survived.
Fortuna	United Kingdom	World War I: The fishing smack was scuttled in the North Sea off the coast of Norfolk by SM UB-40 (Imperial German Navy). Her crew survived.
Janvold	Norway	World War I: The cargo ship was sunk in the Irish Sea 28 nautical miles (52 km) north west of Bardsey Island, Pembrokeshire by SM U-98 (Imperial German Navy) with the loss of four crew.
Kyarra	United Kingdom	World War I: The passenger ship was sunk in the English Channel 2 nautical miles (3.7 km) south south east of Anvil Point, Dorset by SM UB-57 (Imperial German Navy) with the loss of six of her crew.
Le Gard	France	World War I: The passenger ship was torpedoed and sunk in the Mediterranean Sea 88 nautical miles (163 km) north west of Cape Bengut, Algeria by SM UB-49 (Imperial German Navy) with the loss of fourteen lives.
Princess Royal	United Kingdom	World War I: The passenger ship was torpedoed and sunk in the Atlantic Ocean 3 nautical miles (5.6 km) west north west of St. Agnes, Cornwall (50°19′24″N 5°19′54″W) by SM U-101 (Imperial German Navy) with the loss of nineteen crew.
Thames	United Kingdom	World War I: The cargo ship was torpedoed and sunk in the North Sea 6 nautical miles (11 km) south east by east of Seaham, County Durham by SM UC-17 (Imperial German Navy) with the loss of four of her crew.
SM UB-74	Imperial German Navy	World War I: The Type UB III submarine was depth charged and sunk in Lyme Bay (50°32′N 2°32′W) by HMY Lorna (Royal Navy) with the loss of all 35 crew.

== 27 May ==
List of shipwrecks: 27 May 1918
Ship	State	Description
Carmela	Italy	World War I: The brigantine was sunk in the Mediterranean Sea 80 nautical miles (150 km) south east of Formentera, Spain by SM UB-49 (Imperial German Navy).
Carskey	United Kingdom	The ketch sprang a leak and foundered. Her crew were rescued.
Forto	Norway	The cargo ship collided with another vessel and sank. Her crew were rescued.
Joseph Simone	France	World War I: The fishing vessel was sunk in the English Channel north west of Fécamp, Seine-Inférieure by SM UB-57 (Imperial German Navy).
SS Leasowe Castle	United Kingdom	World War I: The troopship was torpedoed and sunk in the Mediterranean Sea 104 nautical miles (193 km) west by north of Alexandria, Egypt (31°30′N 27°56′E) by SM UB-51 (Imperial German Navy) with the loss of 101 lives.
Merionethshire	United Kingdom	World War I: The cargo ship was torpedoed and sunk in the Atlantic Ocean 120 nautical miles (220 km) north of the Azores, Portugal by SM U-62 (Imperial German Navy). Her crew survived.
Molière	France	World War I: The cargo ship was sunk in the Atlantic Ocean 1 nautical mile (1.9 km) off Hartland Point, Devon, United Kingdom by SM U-101 (Imperial German Navy) with the loss of twelve crew.
Petit Georges	France	World War I: the fishing vessel was sunk in the English Channel north west of Fécamp (49°53′N 0°15′E) by SM UB-57 (Imperial German Navy).
Souvenir de Ste Marie	France	World War I: The fishing vessel was sunk in the English Channel north west of Fècamp by SM UB-57 (Imperial German Navy).
Uganda	United Kingdom	World War I: Convoy GaG28: The cargo liner was torpedoed and damaged in the Mediterranean Sea 90 nautical miles (170 km) north east of Algiers, Algeria (38°16′N 3°30′E) by SM UB-49 (Imperial German Navy). She sank on 29 May 40 nautical miles (74 km) north east of Algiers. Her crew survived.
Wayside Flower	United Kingdom	World War I: The vessel was scuttled in the North Sea 20 nautical miles (37 km) north east by north of the mouth of the Humber by SM UC-70 (Imperial German Navy).

== 28 May ==
List of shipwrecks: 28 May 1918
Ship	State	Description
Cairnross	United Kingdom	World War I: The cargo ship was torpedoed and sunk in the Atlantic Ocean 110 nautical miles (200 km) west north west of Flores Island, Azores by SM U-62 (Imperial German Navy). Her crew survived.
Coronation	United Kingdom	World War I: The fishing vessel was scuttled in the North Sea 13 nautical miles (24 km) east south east of Flamborough Head, Yorkshire by SM UC-70 (Imperial German Navy).
Dronning Margrethe	Denmark	World War I: The coaster was sunk in the North Sea 140 kilometres (76 nmi) east of Dundee, Forfarshire, United Kingdom (56°30′N 1°54′E) by SM U-111 (Imperial German Navy). Her crew survived.
Flora	France	World War I: The sailing vessel was scuttled in the Atlantic Ocean 2 nautical miles (3.7 km) off Tintagel, Cornwall, United Kingdom (50°46′N 4°41′W) by SM U-101 (Imperial German Navy).

== 29 May ==
List of shipwrecks: 29 May 1918
Ship	State	Description
Begum	United Kingdom	World War I: The cargo ship was torpedoed and sunk in the Atlantic Ocean 270 nautical miles (500 km) west by south of the Bishop Rock, Isles of Scilly (47°30′N 12°28′W) by SM U-90 (Imperial German Navy) with the loss of fifteen of her crew.
Carlton	United Kingdom	World War I: The cargo ship was torpedoed and sunk in the Atlantic Ocean 270 nautical miles (500 km) west by south of the Bishop Rock by SM U-90 (Imperial German Navy). Her crew survived.
HMT Dirk	Royal Navy	World War I, The coaster, operating as a naval trawler, was torpedoed and sunk in the North Sea off Flamborough Head, Yorkshire (54°08′N 0°11′E) by SM UC-75 (Imperial German Navy) with the loss of twenty of her crew.
Missir	United Kingdom	World War I: The coaster was torpedoed and sunk in the Mediterranean Sea 80 nautical miles (150 km) west by north of Alexandria, Egypt by SM UB-51 (Imperial German Navy) with the loss of 34 crew.
Souvenir	Denmark	World War I: The barque was shelled and sunk in the Atlantic Ocean (51°47′N 7°46′W) by SM U-101 (Imperial German Navy). Her crew survived.

== 30 May ==
List of shipwrecks: 30 May 1918
Ship	State	Description
Asiatic Prince	United Kingdom	World War I: The cargo ship was torpedoed and sunk in the Mediterranean Sea 190 nautical miles (350 km) east by south of Malta by SM U-63 (Imperial German Navy). Her crew survived.
Ausonia	United Kingdom	World War I: The passenger ship was torpedoed and sunk in the Atlantic Ocean 620 nautical miles (1,150 km) west south west of the Fastnet Rock (47°59′N 23°42′W) by SM U-62 (Imperial German Navy) with the loss of 44 crew.
Aymeric	United Kingdom	World War I: The cargo ship was torpedoed and sunk in the Mediterranean Sea 145 nautical miles (269 km) south west by west of Cape Matapan, Greece (34°53′N 20°15′E) by SM U-63 (Imperial German Navy). Her crew survived.
Cyprus	Isle of Man	World War I: The fishing smack was scuttled in the Irish Sea 26 nautical miles (48 km) west north west of the Calf of Man by SM UB-64 (Imperial German Navy). Her crew survived.
Glad Tidings	Isle of Man	World War I: The fishing smack was scuttled in the Irish Sea 26 nautical miles (48 km) west north west of the Calf of Man by SM UB-64 (Imperial German Navy). Her crew survived.
SMS Groning	Imperial German Navy	World War I: The Vorpostenboot was lost on this date.
Honey Bee	United Kingdom	World War I: The fishing vessel was scuttled in the Irish Sea 26 nautical miles (48 km) west north west of the Calf of Man by SM UB-64 (Imperial German Navy). Her crew survived.
Jane Gordon	United Kingdom	World War I: The fishing smack was scuttled in the Irish Sea 26 nautical miles (48 km) west north west of the Calf of Man by SM UB-64 (Imperial German Navy). Her crew survived.
Lloyd	Isle of Man	World War I: The fishing smack was scuttled in the Irish Sea 26 nautical miles (48 km) west north west of the Calf of Man by SM UB-64 (Imperial German Navy). Her crew survived.
Marianne McCrum	United Kingdom	World War I: The fishing smack was scuttled in the Irish Sea 26 nautical miles (48 km) west north west of the Calf of Man by SM UB-64 (Imperial German Navy). Her crew survived.
Never Can Tell	United Kingdom	World War I: The fishing smack was scuttled in the Irish Sea 26 nautical miles (48 km) west north west of the Calf of Man by SM UB-64 (Imperial German Navy). Her crew survived.
Pietro Maroncelli	Italy	World War I: The cargo ship was torpedoed and sunk in the Mediterranean Sea west of Sardinia (40°48′N 8°00′E) by SM UB-49 (Imperial German Navy). Her crew survived.
Seabird	United Kingdom	World War I: The fishing vessel was scuttled in the Irish Sea 26 nautical miles (48 km) west north west of the Calf of Man by SM UB-64 (Imperial German Navy). Her crew survived.
Sparkling Wave	United Kingdom	World War I: The fishing smack was scuttled in the Irish Sea 26 nautical miles (48 km) west north west of the Calf of Man by SM UB-64 (Imperial German Navy). Her crew survived.
St. Mary	United Kingdom	World War I: The fishing smack was scuttled in the Irish Sea 26 nautical miles (48 km) west north west of the Calf of Man by SM UB-64 (Imperial German Navy). Her crew survived.
Waneta	United Kingdom	World War I: The tanker was torpedoed and sunk in the Atlantic Ocean 42 nautical miles (78 km) south south east of the Old Head of Kinsale, County Cork by SM U-101 (Imperial German Navy) with the loss of eight crew.

== 31 May ==
List of shipwrecks: 31 May 1918
Ship	State	Description
Alert	United Kingdom	World War I: The sailing vessel was scuttled in the North Sea 6 nautical miles (11 km) north east of Boulmer, Northumberland by SM UB-40 (Imperial German Navy).
Attila	United Kingdom	The brig caught fire at Itaporã, Brazil. She was beached but was a total loss.
HMS Fairy	Royal Navy	World War I: The Gipsy-class destroyer foundered in the North Sea off Flamborough Head, Yorkshire after ramming and sinking SM UC-75 (Imperial German Navy).
USS President Lincoln	United States Navy	USS President Lincoln World War I: The troopship was torpedoed and sunk in the Atlantic Ocean 600 nautical miles (1,100 km) off Brest, Finistère, France by SM U-90 (Imperial German Navy) with the loss of 26 of the 715 people on board, plus 1 taken as a prisoner of war. Survivors were rescued by USS Smith and USS Warrington (both United States Navy).
Pretty Polly	United Kingdom	World War I: The fishing smack was shelled and sunk in the Atlantic Ocean off the coast of County Galway, Ireland by SM U-101 (Imperial German Navy) with the loss of seven crew.
SM UC-75	Imperial German Navy	World War I: The Type UC II submarine was rammed and sunk in the North Sea off Flamborough Head by Blaydonian (United Kingdom) and HMS Fairy (Royal Navy).

== Unknown date ==
List of shipwrecks: Unknown date 1918
Ship	State	Description
HNLMS Frans Naerebont	Royal Netherlands Navy	World War I: The minesweeper struck a mine and sank in the North Sea off Terschelling, Friesland in early May with the loss of at least five of her nineteen crew.
James Beard	United States	The ferry ran into a dock at Sarnia, Ontario, in fog and sank in 20 feet (6.1 m) of water on 18 or 31 May. Raised on 4 June, repaired and returned to service.
