= UC-35 =

UC-35 may refer to:

- SM UC-35, a World War I German coastal minelaying submarine
- Cessna Citation V, an airplane with a United States military designation of "UC-35"
