= SM U-22 (Germany) =

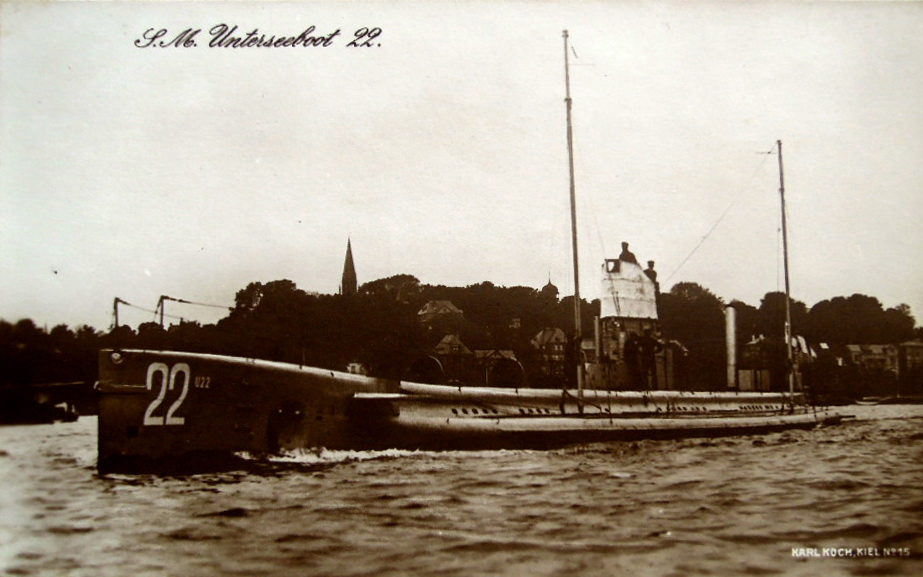
- A German WWI period postcard of U-22

History

German Empire
- Name: U-22
- Ordered: 25 November 1910
- Builder: Kaiserliche Werft Danzig
- Cost: 2,450,000 Goldmark
- Yard number: 16
- Laid down: 14 November 1911
- Launched: 6 March 1913
- Commissioned: 25 November 1913
- Fate: Surrendered 1 December 1918; broken up 1919-22

General characteristics
- Class & type: Type U 19 submarine
- Displacement: 650 t (640 long tons) surfaced; 837 t (824 long tons) submerged
- Length: 64.15 m (210 ft 6 in)
- Beam: 6.10 m (20 ft)
- Height: 7.30 m (23 ft 11 in)
- Draught: 3.58 m (11 ft 9 in)
- Propulsion: 2 shafts; 2 × MAN 8-cylinder two stroke diesel motors with 1,700 PS (1,250 kW; 1,680 shp); 2 × AEG double Motordynamos with 1,200 PS (880 kW; 1,180 shp); 320 rpm submerged
- Speed: 15.4 knots (28.5 km/h; 17.7 mph) surfaced; 9.5 knots (17.6 km/h; 10.9 mph) submerged
- Range: 9,700 nautical miles (18,000 km; 11,200 mi) at 8 kn surfaced; 80 nautical miles (150 km; 92 mi) at 5 kn submerged
- Test depth: 50 m (164 ft 1 in)
- Complement: 4 officers, 31 men
- Armament: 4 × 50 cm (19.7 in) torpedo tubes (2 each bow and stern) with 6 torpedoes; 1 × 8.8 cm (3.5 in) SK L/30 gun (at times 2 ×)

Service record
- Part of: III Flotilla; 1 August 1914 – 23 August 1916; Baltic Flotilla; 23 August 1916 – 16 March 1917; III Flotilla; 16 March 1917 – 11 November 1918
- Commanders: Kptlt. Bruno Hoppe; 25 November 1913 – 22 August 1916; Oblt.z.S. Karl Scherb; 23 August 1916 – 31 May 1917; Oblt.z.S. Hinrich Hermann Hashagen; 1 June 1917 – 11 November 1918
- Operations: 14 patrols
- Victories: 41 merchant ships sunk (38,435 GRT); 2 auxiliary warships sunk (8,086 GRT); 3 merchant ships damaged (8,988 GRT); 1 merchant ship taken as prize (1,170 GRT)

SM U-22 (Note: "SM" stands for "Seiner Majestät" (English: His Majesty's) and combined with the U for Unterseeboot would be translated as His Majesty's Submarine.) was one of 329 submarines serving in the Imperial German Navy in World War I. U-22 was engaged in commerce war as part of the naval warfare, during the First Battle of the Atlantic.

U-22 had a career of 14 patrols, sinking 43 ships for a total of 46,521 tons. In addition, she damaged three ships totalling 8,988 tons, and captured 1 prize worth 1,170 tons.

Oblt.z.S. Hashagen was the most successful, sinking 28 of the vessels, the largest being the British passenger steamer California at 5,629 tons. She was sunk 145 nautical miles (269 km; 167 mi) NWxN3/4N of Cape Villano on 17 October 1917.

U-22 was surrendered to the Allies at Harwich on 1 December 1918 in accordance with the requirements of the Armistice with Germany. She was sold (with one of her engines) by the British Admiralty to Hughes Bolckow on 3 March 1919 for £2,975, and was broken up at Blyth between 25 April 1919 and 1922.

== Summary of raiding history ==
Date	Name	Nationality	Tonnage (Note: Merchant ship tonnages are in gross register tons. Military vessels are listed by tons displacement.)	Fate
21 January 1915	U-7	Imperial German Navy		Sunk by accident (friendly fire)
21 April 1915	Ruth	Sweden	867	Sunk
22 April 1915	St. Lawrence	United Kingdom	196	Sunk
15 June 1915	Strathnairn	United Kingdom	4,336	Sunk
16 June 1915	Trafford	United Kingdom	215	Sunk
16 June 1915	Turnwell	United Kingdom	4,264	Damaged
20 June 1915	Premier	United Kingdom	169	Sunk
8 August 1915	India	Royal Navy	7,911	Sunk
12 August 1915	Grodno	United Kingdom	1,955	Sunk
6 April 1916	Vennacher	United Kingdom	4,700	Damaged
8 April 1916	Adamton	United Kingdom	2,304	Sunk
13 April 1916	Chic	United Kingdom	3,037	Sunk
21 June 1916	Francoise D’amboise	France	1,973	Sunk
2 November 1916	Vanadis	Russia	384	Sunk
2 November 1916	Runhild	Sweden	1,170	Captured as prize
3 November 1916	Ägir	Sweden	427	Sunk
3 November 1916	Frans	Sweden	134	Sunk
3 November 1916	Jönköping	Sweden	82	Sunk
8 November 1916	Taimi	Russia	114	Sunk
11 November 1916	Astrid	Sweden	191	Sunk
7 August 1917	Jarl	Sweden	1,643	Sunk
11 October 1917	Elve	United Kingdom	899	Sunk
16 October 1917	Jennie E. Righter	United States	647	Sunk
17 October 1917	California	United Kingdom	5,629	Sunk
19 October 1917	Australdale	Australia	4,379	Sunk
19 October 1917	Staro	Norway	1,805	Sunk
20 October 1917	Snetinden	Norway	2,859	Sunk
6 January 1918	Saint Mathieu	French Navy	175	Sunk
2 March 1918	Stina	Sweden	1,136	Sunk
11 May 1918	Michail	Russia	150	Sunk
12 May 1918	Kong Raud	Norway	60	Sunk
12 May 1918	Tennes	Norway	58	Sunk
12 May 1918	Vea	Norway	40	Sunk
14 May 1918	Stairs	Norway	54	Sunk
16 May 1918	Polarstrommen	Norway	54	Sunk
16 May 1918	Fedor Tschishoff	Russia	832	Sunk
16 May 1918	Unidentified fishing vessel	Russia	80	Sunk
19 May 1918	Forsok	Norway	31	Sunk
20 May 1918	Hertha	Russia	253	Sunk
19 August 1918	Buoni Amici	Italy	265	Sunk
20 August 1918	Magalhaes Lima	Portugal	196	Sunk
22 August 1918	Maria Luiza	Portugal	148	Sunk
31 August 1918	Norte	Portugal	254	Sunk
1 September 1918	Libertador	Portugal	185	Sunk
4 September 1918	Santa Maria	Portugal	48	Sunk
4 September 1918	Villa Franca	Portugal	46	Sunk
4 September 1918	Lloyd	Portugal	300	Sunk
4 September 1918	Prateado	Portugal	24	Damaged

== Bibliography ==
- Gröner, Erich; Jung, Dieter; Maass, Martin (1991). U-boats and Mine Warfare Vessels. German Warships 1815–1945. Vol. 2. Translated by Thomas, Keith; Magowan, Rachel. London: Conway Maritime Press. ISBN 0-85177-593-4.
