= SM UB-51 =

German Imperial Navy submarine

- UB-148 at sea, a U-boat similar to UB-51.

History

German Empire
- Name: UB-51
- Ordered: 20 May 1916
- Builder: Blohm & Voss, Hamburg
- Cost: 3,276,000 German Papiermark
- Yard number: 296
- Launched: 8 March 1917
- Commissioned: 26 July 1917
- Fate: Surrendered 16 January 1919; broken up at Swansea

General characteristics
- Class & type: Type UB III submarine
- Displacement: 516 t (508 long tons) surfaced; 651 t (641 long tons) submerged
- Length: 55.30 m (181 ft 5 in) (o/a)
- Beam: 5.80 m (19 ft)
- Draught: 3.68 m (12 ft 1 in)
- Propulsion: 2 × propeller shaft; 2 × MAN four-stroke 6-cylinder diesel engines, 1,085 bhp (809 kW); 2 × Siemens-Schuckert electric motors, 780 shp (580 kW)
- Speed: 13.6 knots (25.2 km/h; 15.7 mph) surfaced; 8 knots (15 km/h; 9.2 mph) submerged
- Range: 9,040 nmi (16,740 km; 10,400 mi) at 6 knots (11 km/h; 6.9 mph) surfaced; 55 nmi (102 km; 63 mi) at 4 knots (7.4 km/h; 4.6 mph) submerged
- Test depth: 50 m (160 ft)
- Complement: 3 officers, 31 men
- Armament: 5 × 50 cm (19.7 in) torpedo tubes (4 bow, 1 stern); 10 torpedoes; 1 × 8.8 cm (3.46 in) deck gun

Service record
- Part of: Mittelmeer / Mittelmeer II Flotilla; 19 October 1917 – 11 November 1918
- Commanders: Kptlt. Ernst Krafft; 26 July 1917 – 27 November 1918
- Operations: 6 patrols
- Victories: 18 merchant ships sunk (47,514 GRT); 1 auxiliary warship sunk (257 GRT); 1 merchant ship damaged (3,905 GRT)

SM UB-51 was a German Type UB III submarine or U-boat in the German Imperial Navy (German: Kaiserliche Marine) during World War I. She was commissioned into the Pola Flotilla of the German Imperial Navy on 26 July 1917 as SM UB-51. (Note: "SM" stands for "Seiner Majestät" (English: His Majesty's) and combined with the U for Unterseeboot would be translated as His Majesty's Submarine.)

She operated as part of the Pola Flotilla based in Cattaro. UB-51 was surrendered 16 January 1919 with the remainder of the Pola Flotilla following orders by Admiral Reinhard Scheer to return to port. UB-51 was later broken up at Swansea.

== Construction ==
UB-51 was ordered by the GIN on 20 May 1916. She was built by Blohm & Voss, Hamburg and following just under a year of construction, launched at Hamburg on 8 March 1917. UB-51 was commissioned later that same year under the command of Kptlt. Ernst Krafft. Like all Type UB III submarines, UB-51 carried 10 torpedoes and was armed with a 8.8 cm (3.46 in) deck gun. UB-51 would carry a crew of up to 3 officer and 31 men and had a cruising range of 9,040 nautical miles (16,740 km; 10,400 mi). UB-51 had a displacement of 516 t (508 long tons) while surfaced and 651 t (641 long tons) when submerged. Her engines enabled her to travel at 13.6 knots (25.2 km/h; 15.7 mph) when surfaced and 8 knots (15 km/h; 9.2 mph) when submerged.

== Summary of raiding history ==
Date	Name	Nationality	Tonnage (Note: Tonnages are in gross register tons)	Fate
30 September 1917	Amiral Troude	France	1,876	Sunk
5 October 1917	Forestmoor	United Kingdom	2,844	Sunk
12 October 1917	Themis	Norway	7,403	Sunk
17 November 1917	Clan Maccorquodale	United Kingdom	6,517	Sunk
27 November 1917	Tungue	Portugal	8,021	Sunk
8 February 1918	Cimbrier	United Kingdom	3,905	Damaged
10 May 1918	Szechuen	United Kingdom	1,862	Sunk
16 May 1918	Mansoura	France	50	Sunk
18 May 1918	Mabrouka	France	25	Sunk
18 May 1918	Tewfig El Bari	France	100	Sunk
18 May 1918	Maria	France	60	Sunk
18 May 1918	Menewar	France	270	Sunk
18 May 1918	Mabrouka	France	25	Sunk
27 May 1918	Leasowe Castle	United Kingdom	9,737	Sunk
29 May 1918	Missir	United Kingdom	786	Sunk
11 July 1918	Bacchus	France	2,045	Sunk
20 July 1918	Kosseir	United Kingdom	1,855	Sunk
22 July 1918	HMT Ijuin	Royal Navy	257	Sunk
22 July 1918	L 1	United Kingdom	130	Sunk
28 July 1918	Hyperia	United Kingdom	3,908	Sunk

== Bibliography ==
- Bendert, Harald (2000). Die UB-Boote der Kaiserlichen Marine, 1914-1918. Einsätze, Erfolge, Schicksal (in German). Hamburg: Verlag E.S. Mittler & Sohn GmbH. ISBN 3-8132-0713-7.
- Gröner, Erich; Jung, Dieter; Maass, Martin (1991). U-boats and Mine Warfare Vessels. German Warships 1815–1945. Vol. 2. Translated by Thomas, Keith; Magowan, Rachel. London: Conway Maritime Press. ISBN 0-85177-593-4.
- Rössler, Eberhard (1979). Die deutschen U-Boote und ihre Werften: eine Bilddokumentation über den deutschen U-Bootbau; in zwei Bänden (in German). Vol. I. Munich: Bernard & Graefe. ISBN 3-7637-5213-7.
