= SM UC-52 =

German minelaying submarine

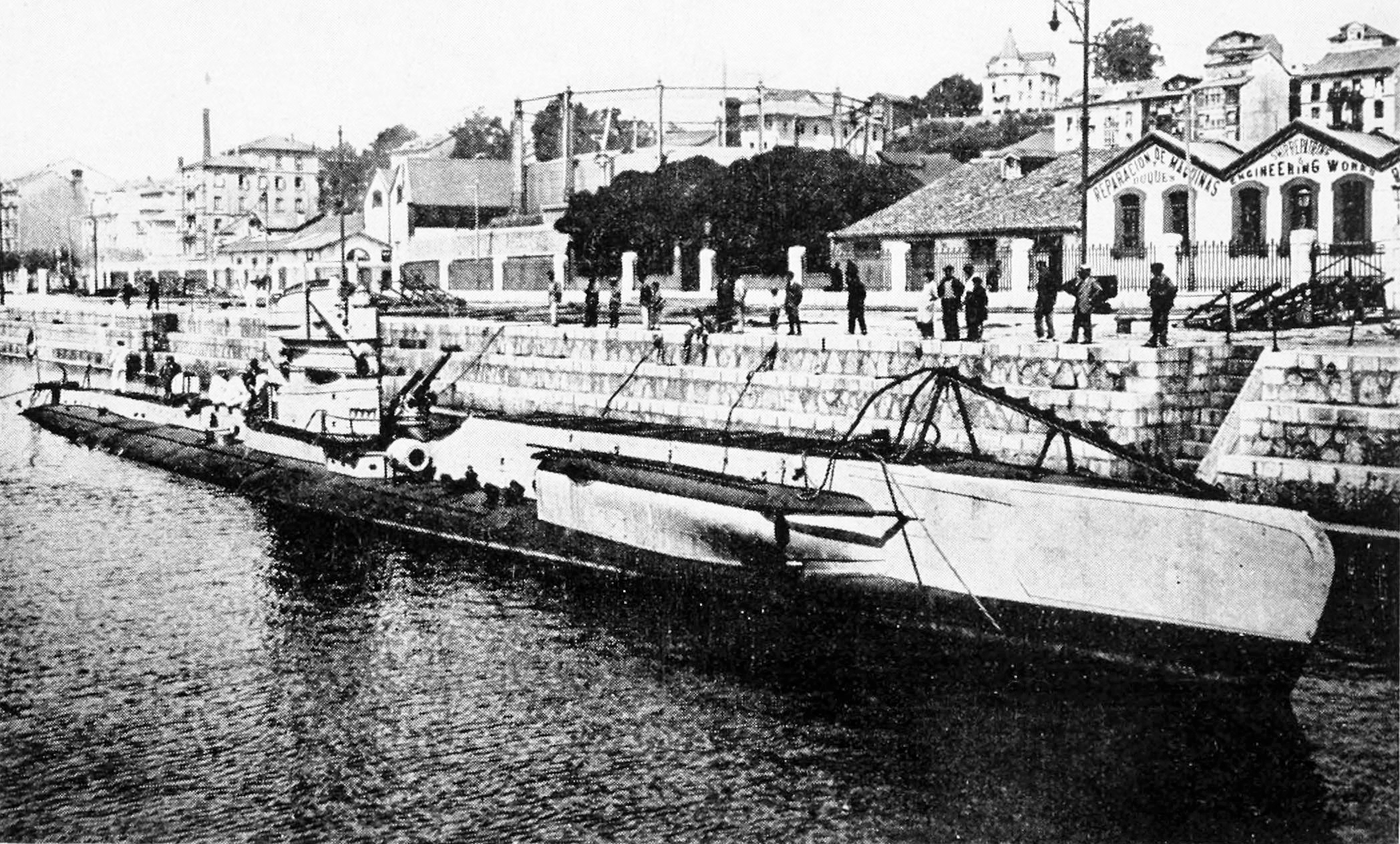
- German submarine UC-56 after internment at Santander, Spain

History

German Empire
- Name: UC-52
- Ordered: 12 January 1916
- Builder: Germaniawerft, Kiel
- Yard number: 268
- Launched: 23 January 1917
- Commissioned: 15 March 1917
- Fate: Surrendered, 16 January 1919; broken up

General characteristics
- Class & type: Type UC II submarine
- Displacement: 434 t (427 long tons), surfaced; 511 t (503 long tons), submerged
- Length: 52.69 m (172 ft 10 in) o/a; 40.96 m (134 ft 5 in) pressure hull
- Beam: 5.22 m (17 ft 2 in) o/a; 3.65 m (12 ft) pressure hull
- Draught: 3.64 m (11 ft 11 in)
- Propulsion: 2 × propeller shafts; 2 × 6-cylinder, 4-stroke diesel engines, 580–600 PS (430–440 kW; 570–590 shp); 2 × electric motors, 620 PS (460 kW; 610 shp)
- Speed: 11.8 knots (21.9 km/h; 13.6 mph), surfaced; 7.2 knots (13.3 km/h; 8.3 mph), submerged
- Range: 8,820–9,450 nmi (16,330–17,500 km; 10,150–10,870 mi) at 7 knots (13 km/h; 8.1 mph) surfaced; 56 nmi (104 km; 64 mi) at 4 knots (7.4 km/h; 4.6 mph) submerged
- Test depth: 50 m (160 ft)
- Complement: 26
- Armament: 6 × 100 cm (39.4 in) mine tubes; 18 × UC 200 mines; 3 × 50 cm (19.7 in) torpedo tubes (2 bow/external; one stern); 7 × torpedoes; 1 × 8.8 cm (3.5 in) Uk L/30 deck gun
- Notes: 30-second diving time

Service record
- Part of: Mittelmeer / Mittelmeer II Flotilla; 8 July 1917 – 11 November 1918
- Commanders: Kptlt. Ludwig Karl Sahl; 15 March – 27 September 1917; Oblt.z.S. Hellmuth von Doemming; 28 September 1917 – 17 July 1918; Oblt.z.S. Carl Heinrich Saß; 18 July – 11 November 1918
- Operations: 7 patrols
- Victories: 17 merchant ships sunk (17,217 GRT); 1 auxiliary warship sunk (1,013 GRT); 4 merchant ships damaged (13,580 GRT)

SM UC-52 was a German Type UC II minelaying submarine or U-boat in the German Imperial Navy (German: Kaiserliche Marine) during World War I. The U-boat was ordered on 12 January 1916 and was launched on 23 January 1917. She was commissioned into the German Imperial Navy on 15 March 1917 as SM UC-52. (Note: "SM" stands for "Seiner Majestät" (English: His Majesty's) and combined with the U for Unterseeboot would be translated as His Majesty's Submarine.) In seven patrols UC-52 was credited with sinking 18 ships, either by torpedo or by mines laid. She notably sank the Italian troopship Verona, killing 880 soldiers. UC-52 was surrendered on 16 January 1919 and broken up at Morecambe.

== Design ==
A Type UC II submarine, UC-52 had a displacement of 434 tonnes (427 long tons) when at the surface and 511 tonnes (503 long tons) while submerged. She had a length overall of 52.69 m (172 ft 10 in), a beam of 5.22 m (17 ft 2 in), and a draught of 3.64 m (11 ft 11 in). The submarine was powered by two six-cylinder four-stroke diesel engines each producing 290–300 metric horsepower (210–220 kW; 290–300 shp) (a total of 580–600 metric horsepower (430–440 kW; 570–590 shp)), two electric motors producing 620 metric horsepower (460 kW; 610 shp), and two propeller shafts. She had a dive time of 48 seconds and was capable of operating at a depth of 50 metres (160 ft).

The submarine had a maximum surface speed of 11.8 knots (21.9 km/h; 13.6 mph) and a submerged speed of 7.2 knots (13.3 km/h; 8.3 mph). When submerged, she could operate for 56 nautical miles (104 km; 64 mi) at 4 knots (7.4 km/h; 4.6 mph); when surfaced, she could travel 8,820 to 9,450 nautical miles (16,330 to 17,500 km; 10,150 to 10,870 mi) at 7 knots (13 km/h; 8.1 mph). UC-52 was fitted with six 100 centimetres (39 in) mine tubes, eighteen UC 200 mines, three 50 centimetres (20 in) torpedo tubes (one on the stern and two on the bow), seven torpedoes, and one 8.8 cm (3.5 in) Uk L/30 deck gun. Her complement was twenty-six crew members.

== Summary of raiding history ==
Date	Name	Nationality	Tonnage (Note: Merchant ship tonnages are in gross register tons. Military vessels are listed by tons displacement.)	Fate
13 September 1917	Arlequin	Tunisia	6	Sunk
13 September 1917	Chere Rose	Tunisia	28	Sunk
13 September 1917	Ortigia	Tunisia	17	Sunk
13 September 1917	Vittoria	Tunisia	24	Sunk
18 September 1917	Cachalot	Tunisia	17	Sunk
31 March 1918	San Nicola	United Kingdom	24	Sunk
6 April 1918	Madonna delle Grazie B.	Kingdom of Italy	105	Sunk
9 April 1918	Sunik	United Kingdom	5,017	Damaged
10 April 1918	Airedale	United Kingdom	3,044	Damaged
11 May 1918	Gigilla	Kingdom of Italy	120	Sunk
11 May 1918	Verona	Kingdom of Italy	8,261	Sunk
14 May 1918	Woolston	United Kingdom	2,986	Sunk
17 May 1918	Pietro Brizzolari	Kingdom of Italy	445	Sunk
18 May 1918	HMS Chesterfield	Royal Navy	1,013	Sunk
18 May 1918	Ninetta	Kingdom of Italy	17	Sunk
22 June 1918	Metamorphosis	Greece	130	Sunk
24 June 1918	Maria	Greece	25	Sunk
24 June 1918	Sofia	Greece	24	Sunk
4 July 1918	Cordova	Kingdom of Italy	4,933	Sunk
7 July 1918	Vergine Di Lourdes	Kingdom of Italy	55	Sunk
7 July 1918	Stalheim	Norway	1,469	Damaged
23 October 1918	Ischia	Kingdom of Italy	4,050	Damaged
