= SM UB-70 =

- UB-148 at sea, a U-boat similar to UB-70.

History

German Empire
- Name: UB-70
- Ordered: 20 May 1916
- Builder: Friedrich Krupp Germaniawerft, Kiel
- Cost: 3,276,000 German Papiermark
- Yard number: 288
- Launched: 7 August 1917
- Commissioned: 12 October 1917
- Fate: Missing after 5 May 1918

General characteristics
- Class & type: Type UB III submarine
- Displacement: 513 t (505 long tons) surfaced; 647 t (637 long tons) submerged
- Length: 55.83 m (183 ft 2 in) (o/a)
- Beam: 5.80 m (19 ft)
- Draught: 3.67 m (12 ft 0 in)
- Propulsion: 2 × propeller shaft; 2 × MAN four-stroke 6-cylinder diesel engines, 1,085 bhp (809 kW); 2 × Siemens-Schuckert electric motors, 780 shp (580 kW)
- Speed: 13.2 knots (24.4 km/h; 15.2 mph) surfaced; 7.6 knots (14.1 km/h; 8.7 mph) submerged
- Range: 9,090 nmi (16,830 km; 10,460 mi) at 6 knots (11 km/h; 6.9 mph) surfaced; 55 nmi (102 km; 63 mi) at 4 knots (7.4 km/h; 4.6 mph) submerged
- Test depth: 50 m (160 ft)
- Complement: 3 officers, 31 men
- Armament: 5 × 50 cm (19.7 in) torpedo tubes (4 bow, 1 stern); 10 torpedoes; 1 × 8.8 cm (3.46 in) deck gun

Service record
- Part of: I Flotilla; Unknown – 5 May 1918
- Commanders: Kptlt. Johannes Remy; 29 October 1917 – 5 May 1918
- Operations: 2 patrols
- Victories: 1 merchant ship sunk (1,794 GRT)

SM UB-70 was a German Type UB III submarine or U-boat in the German Imperial Navy (German: Kaiserliche Marine) during World War I. She was commissioned into the German Imperial Navy on 29 October 1917 as SM UB-70. (Note: "SM" stands for "Seiner Majestät" (English: His Majesty's) and combined with the U for Unterseeboot would be translated as His Majesty's Submarine.)

UB-70 was serving in the Mediterranean when she departed on her last patrol on 16 April 1918. She was last heard from on 5 May 1918 when she reported herself to be in the Mediterranean Sea east of Gibraltar. She was never seen or heard from again. Her entire crew of 33 men was lost.

== Construction ==
UB-70 was built by Friedrich Krupp Germaniawerft of Kiel and following just under a year of construction, launched at Kiel on 17 August 1917. UB-70 was commissioned later that same year under the command of Kptlt. Johannes Remy. Like all Type UB III submarines, UB-70 carried 10 torpedoes and was armed with a 8.8 cm (3.46 in) deck gun. UB-70 would carry a crew of up to 3 officer and 31 men and had a cruising range of 9,090 nautical miles (16,830 km; 10,460 mi). UB-70 had a displacement of 513 t (505 long tons) while surfaced and 647 t (637 long tons) when submerged. Her engines enabled her to travel at 13.2 knots (24.4 km/h; 15.2 mph) when surfaced and 7.6 knots (14.1 km/h; 8.7 mph) when submerged.

== Summary of raiding history ==
Date	Name	Nationality	Tonnage (Note: Tonnages are in gross register tons)	Fate
2 May 1918	Valdivia	France	1,794	Sunk

== Bibliography ==
- Bendert, Harald (2000). Die UB-Boote der Kaiserlichen Marine, 1914-1918. Einsätze, Erfolge, Schicksal (in German). Hamburg: Verlag E.S. Mittler & Sohn GmbH. ISBN 3-8132-0713-7.
- Gröner, Erich; Jung, Dieter; Maass, Martin (1991). U-boats and Mine Warfare Vessels. German Warships 1815–1945. Vol. 2. Translated by Thomas, Keith; Magowan, Rachel. London: Conway Maritime Press. ISBN 0-85177-593-4.
- Rössler, Eberhard (1979). Die deutschen U-Boote und ihre Werften: eine Bilddokumentation über den deutschen U-Bootbau; in zwei Bänden (in German). Vol. I. Munich: Bernard & Graefe. ISBN 3-7637-5213-7.
