= HMS D4 =

Submarine of the Royal Navy

- HMS D4

History

United Kingdom
- Name: HMS D4
- Builder: Vickers Armstrong, Barrow-in-Furness
- Laid down: 24 February 1910
- Launched: 27 May 1911
- Commissioned: 29 November 1911
- Decommissioned: 1919
- Fate: Sold 17 December 1921 to H Pounds, Portsmouth

General characteristics
- Class & type: D-class submarine
- Displacement: Surfaced= 483 tons / Submerged= 595 tons
- Length: 163.0 ft (49.7 m) (oa)
- Beam: 13.6 ft (4.1 m) (oa)
- Propulsion: 550 hp electric 1750 hp diesel twin screws
- Speed: Surfaced=14.0 kn / Dived= 10.0 (design) 9.0 (service)
- Range: Surface= 2500 nmi at 10 kn / Submerged=45 nmi at 5 kn
- Complement: 25
- Armament: 3x18 in (46 cm) torpedo tubes (2 forward, one aft, 6 torpedoes) / 1x12 pdr (76 mm) QF gun

HMS D4 was a British D-class submarine built by Vickers, Barrow. D4 was laid down on 24 February 1910, launched 27 May 1911 and was commissioned on 29 November 1911. She was the first submarine to be fitted with a gun for offensive use.

During World War I, on 22 June 1915, D4 found the stranded German minesweeper Bielefeld in the Heligoland Bight off Juist, Germany, guarded by a German destroyer. D4′s commanding officer decided to attack the destroyer first, but the torpedo D4 fired missed. The alerted destroyer made several runs over D4, which was submerged in water only 30 feet (9.1 metres) deep, in an attempt to ram her, but did not succeed and eventually left the scene. D4 then surfaced and sank Bielefeld. Although the Germans salvaged Bielefeld, she did not go back into naval service and instead was returned to her pre-war civilian owners.

Later in her career, D4 torpedoed UB-72 on 12 May 1918. At 04:30 that day, whilst on patrol approximately midway between Guernsey and Portland Bill, D4 observed UB-72 on the surface travelling in a southerly direction some two miles distant. Five minutes later Lt Claud Barry, in command of D4, saw UB-72, obviously unaware of the British boat's presence, alter course so that the U-boat appeared to be approaching D4. In order that his presence should not be detected Lt Barry lowered his periscope for a few minutes but at 0443 D4′s periscope was raised to reveal UB-72 steering an easterly course. A few minutes later UB-72 was on the British boat's port side and Barry waited until the U-boat came on to his sights. At 0450 Lt Barry fired a torpedo 600 yards (550 metres) from the target and after lowering the periscope for a few moments he released a second one. Ten seconds later the crew of D4 heard an explosion and felt a violent concussion. Barry brought his boat to the surface and headed towards three men swimming in a patch of oil. He succeeded in picking up these men, who were the only survivors of UB-72′s crew of three officers and thirty-one men.

D4 was decommissioned in 1919 and was then sold on 17 December 1921 to H Pounds, Portsmouth.
