= SM UC-35 =

German submarine used during World War I

History

German Empire
- Name: UC-35
- Ordered: 20 November 1915
- Builder: Blohm & Voss, Hamburg
- Yard number: 276
- Launched: 6 May 1916
- Commissioned: 2 October 1916
- Fate: Sunk, 16 May 1918

General characteristics
- Class & type: Type UC II submarine
- Displacement: 427 t (420 long tons), surfaced; 509 t (501 long tons), submerged
- Length: 50.35 m (165 ft 2 in) o/a; 40.30 m (132 ft 3 in) pressure hull
- Beam: 5.22 m (17 ft 2 in) o/a; 3.65 m (12 ft) pressure hull
- Draught: 3.65 m (12 ft)
- Propulsion: 2 × propeller shafts; 2 × 6-cylinder, 4-stroke diesel engines, 600 PS (440 kW; 590 shp); 2 × electric motors, 460 PS (340 kW; 450 shp)
- Speed: 11.6 knots (21.5 km/h; 13.3 mph), surfaced; 6.8 knots (12.6 km/h; 7.8 mph), submerged
- Range: 10,180 nmi (18,850 km; 11,710 mi) at 7 knots (13 km/h; 8.1 mph) surfaced; 54 nmi (100 km; 62 mi) at 4 knots (7.4 km/h; 4.6 mph) submerged
- Test depth: 50 m (160 ft)
- Complement: 26
- Armament: 6 × 100 cm (39.4 in) mine tubes; 18 × UC 200 mines; 3 × 50 cm (19.7 in) torpedo tubes (2 bow/external; one stern); 7 × torpedoes; 1 × 8.8 cm (3.5 in) Uk L/30 deck gun
- Notes: 35-second diving time

Service record
- Part of: Pola / Mittelmeer / Mittelmeer II Flotilla; 25 December 1916 – 16 May 1918
- Commanders: Kptlt. Ernst von Voigt; 4 October 1916 – 13 June 1917; Oblt.z.S. Hans Paul Korsch; 14 June 1917 – 16 May 1918
- Operations: 11 patrols
- Victories: 46 merchant ships sunk (67,348 GRT); 1 warship sunk (970 tons); 1 auxiliary warship sunk (2,766 GRT); 5 merchant ships damaged (16,706 GRT)

SM UC-35 was a German Type UC II minelaying submarine or U-boat in the German Imperial Navy (German: Kaiserliche Marine) during World War I. The U-boat was ordered on 20 November 1915 and was launched on 6 May 1916. She was commissioned into the German Imperial Navy on 2 October 1916 as SM UC-35. (Note: "SM" stands for "Seiner Majestät" (English: His Majesty's) and combined with the U for Unterseeboot would be translated as His Majesty's Submarine.) In eleven patrols UC-35 was credited with sinking 48 ships, either by torpedo or by mines laid. UC-35 was sunk by gunfire from the French naval trawler Ailly southwest of Sardinia on 16 May 1918 at 39°48′N 7°42′E.

== Design ==
A Type UC II submarine, UC-35 had a displacement of 427 tonnes (420 long tons) when at the surface and 509 tonnes (501 long tons) while submerged. She had a length overall of 50.35 m (165 ft 2 in), a beam of 5.22 m (17 ft 2 in), and a draught of 3.65 m (12 ft). The submarine was powered by two six-cylinder four-stroke diesel engines each producing 300 metric horsepower (220 kW; 300 shp) (a total of 600 metric horsepower (590 shp; 440 kW)), two electric motors producing 460 metric horsepower (340 kW; 450 shp), and two propeller shafts. She had a dive time of 35 seconds and was capable of operating at a depth of 50 metres (160 ft).

The submarine had a maximum surface speed of 11.8 knots (21.9 km/h; 13.6 mph) and a submerged speed of 6.6 knots (12.2 km/h; 7.6 mph). When submerged, she could operate for 54 nautical miles (100 km; 62 mi) at 4 knots (7.4 km/h; 4.6 mph); when surfaced, she could travel 10,180 nautical miles (18,850 km; 11,710 mi) at 7 knots (13 km/h; 8.1 mph). UC-35 was fitted with six 100 centimetres (39 in) mine tubes, eighteen UC 200 mines, three 50 centimetres (20 in) torpedo tubes (one on the stern and two on the bow), seven torpedoes, and one 8.8 cm (3.5 in) Uk L/30 deck gun. Her complement was twenty-six crew members.

== Summary of raiding history ==
| Date | Name | Nationality | Tonnage (Note: Merchant ship tonnages are in gross register tons. Military vessels are listed by tons displacement.) | Fate |
|---|---|---|---|---|
| 22 February 1917 | Nostra Signora Del Porto Salvo | United Kingdom | 136 | Sunk |
| 28 February 1917 | Cassini | French Navy | 970 | Sunk |
| 28 February 1917 | Elisabetta Concettina | Kingdom of Italy | 45 | Sunk |
| 28 February 1917 | Giustina Madre | Kingdom of Italy | 35 | Sunk |
| 3 March 1917 | River Forth | United Kingdom | 4,421 | Sunk |
| 4 April 1917 | City of Paris | United Kingdom | 9,191 | Sunk |
| 9 May 1917 | Dio Ti Guardi | Kingdom of Italy | 11 | Sunk |
| 9 May 1917 | L’Oriente | Kingdom of Italy | 11 | Sunk |
| 9 May 1917 | Peppino Aiello | Kingdom of Italy | 111 | Sunk |
| 9 May 1917 | San Pietro | Kingdom of Italy | 11 | Sunk |
| 10 May 1917 | Leone Decimo Terzo | Kingdom of Italy | 78 | Sunk |
| 11 May 1917 | Limassol | United Kingdom | 100 | Sunk |
| 11 May 1917 | Luisa Madre | Kingdom of Italy | 85 | Sunk |
| 11 May 1917 | Carolina | Kingdom of Italy | 87 | Sunk |
| 11 May 1917 | Rosalia Madre | Kingdom of Italy | 95 | Sunk |
| 11 May 1917 | Sant’ Antonio | Kingdom of Italy | 40 | Sunk |
| 16 May 1917 | Hilonian | United States | 2,921 | Sunk |
| 23 May 1917 | Pipitsa | Greece | 224 | Sunk |
| 24 May 1917 | McClure | United Kingdom | 220 | Sunk |
| 25 May 1917 | Nicolino | Kingdom of Italy | 121 | Sunk |
| 26 May 1917 | Risorgimento | Kingdom of Italy | 222 | Sunk |
| 3 June 1917 | Dockleaf | United Kingdom | 5,311 | Damaged |
| 10 June 1917 | Annam | France | 6,075 | Sunk |
| 25 June 1917 | Anatolia | United Kingdom | 3,847 | Sunk |
| 9 August 1917 | Alfonso | Kingdom of Italy | 15 | Sunk |
| 9 August 1917 | S. Gerlano | Kingdom of Italy | 11 | Sunk |
| 14 August 1917 | Umberto I | Regia Marina | 2,766 | Sunk |
| 17 August 1917 | Lorenzina Aiello | Kingdom of Italy | 120 | Sunk |
| 17 August 1917 | San Rossore | Kingdom of Italy | 5,601 | Damaged |
| 26 August 1917 | Maria Del Carmine | Kingdom of Italy | 108 | Sunk |
| 3 October 1917 | Elisa | Kingdom of Italy | 178 | Sunk |
| 3 October 1917 | Giuseppe Ferrante | Kingdom of Italy | 51 | Sunk |
| 11 October 1917 | Cayo Bonito | United Kingdom | 3,427 | Sunk |
| 11 October 1917 | Italia | Kingdom of Italy | 3,456 | Sunk |
| 11 October 1917 | Lovli | Kingdom of Italy | 7,212 | Sunk |
| 13 October 1917 | Tripoli | Kingdom of Italy | 1,743 | Damaged |
| 12 November 1917 | Anteo | Kingdom of Italy | 2,774 | Sunk |
| 22 November 1917 | Kohistan | United Kingdom | 4,732 | Sunk |
| 23 November 1917 | Luigina | Kingdom of Italy | 278 | Sunk |
| 26 November 1917 | Pontida | Kingdom of Italy | 5,834 | Sunk |
| 27 November 1917 | Thornhill | United Kingdom | 3,848 | Damaged |
| 28 November 1917 | Albert Watts | United States | 3,302 | Sunk |
| 4 December 1917 | Alberto Verderame | Kingdom of Italy | 195 | Sunk |
| 31 March 1918 | Immacolata | Kingdom of Italy | 35 | Sunk |
| 4 April 1918 | Liberia | France | 1,942 | Sunk |
| 5 April 1918 | Camelia | Kingdom of Italy | 396 | Sunk |
| 3 May 1918 | Il Francesco | Kingdom of Italy | 116 | Sunk |
| 5 May 1918 | Carrione | Kingdom of Italy | 65 | Sunk |
| 5 May 1918 | Il Secondo | Kingdom of Italy | 203 | Damaged |
| 9 May 1918 | Deipara | Kingdom of Italy | 2,282 | Sunk |
| 12 May 1918 | Pax | France | 798 | Sunk |
| 12 May 1918 | Togo | Kingdom of Italy | 1,484 | Sunk |
| 15 May 1918 | Villa De Soller | Spain | 450 | Sunk |
