= List of designations under the Protection of Military Remains Act =

This is a list of all military vessels designated under the Protection of Military Remains Act 1986, an act of the Parliament of the United Kingdom. All of the wrecks are designated under the 2026 order (which came into force on 30 March 2026) since this revoked the previous order. Information about the wrecks can generally be found in the announcement for the year that they designated (2002, 2006, 2008, 2009, 2017, 2019 or 2026).

== Other wrecks with protected status ==
The primary reason for designation under this Act is to protect as a 'war grave' the last resting place of UK servicemen (or other nationals). HMS Ardent (F184), HMS Antelope and HMS Coventry, which were sunk in the Falklands War, are not protected under this act, but are protected under the Falkland Islands Protection of Wrecks Ordnance 1977.

The Protection of Wrecks Act 1973 provides for wrecks to be designated for their historical, archaeological or artistic value or because they are dangerous. A small number of wrecks are given protection under the Ancient Monuments and Archaeological Areas Act 1979.

== List of protected places designated under the Act ==
Protected places are designated by name and can be designated even if the exact location is not known. Diving on these sites is permitted, but it is an offence to penetrate the wreck, interfere with, disturb or remove anything from the site unless licensed to do so by the Ministry of Defence.

| Name | Year designated | Date sunk | Conflict | Location |
|---|---|---|---|---|
| Atlantic Conveyor | 2008 | 25 May 1982 | Falklands War | Falkland Islands; 50°40′S 54°28′W |
| HMS Aboukir | 2017 | 22 September 1914 | First World War | North Sea |
| HMS Acheron | 2006 | 17 December 1940 | Second World War | Isle of Wight |
| HMS Albacore (1909) | 2026 | 9 March 1917 | | |
| HMS Amphion | 2008 | 6 August 1914 | First World War | Harwich |
| HMHS Anglia | 2017 | 17 November 1915 | First World War | English Channel; 51°2′N 1°19′E |
| HMS Ardent (1913) | 2006 | 31 May 1916 | First World War, Battle of Jutland | Jutland—international waters |
| SS Armenian | 2017 | 28 June 1915 | First World War | Cornwall |
| HMT Beech | 2012 | 22 June 1941 | | |
| HMS Black Prince | 2006 | 31 May 1916 | First World War, Battle of Jutland | Jutland—international waters |
| HMS Blackwood | 2006 | 15 June 1944 | Second World War | Dorset |
| HMS Boadicea | 2006 | 13 June 1944 | Second World War | Isle of Portland |
| HMS Bullen | 2006 | 6 December 1944 | Second World War | North West Scotland |
| RFA Cairndale | 2026 | 30 May 1941 | | |
| HMS Calgarian | 2009 | 1 March 1918 | First World War | Northern Ireland |
| Chasseur 06 | 2019 | 11 October 1940 | | |
| Chasseur 07 | 2019 | 11 October 1940 | | |
| HMS Coquette (1897) | 2026 | 7 March 1916 | | |
| RFA Creosol | 2012 | 7 February 1918 | | |
| HMS Cressy | 2017 | 22 September 1914 | First World War | North Sea; 52°15′01″N 3°40′08″E |
| HMS Curaçao | 2008 | 2 October 1942 | Second World War | North West Ireland |
| HMS C29 | 2019 | 29 August 1915 | First World War | |
| HMS Defence | 2006 | 31 May 1916 | First World War, Battle of Jutland | Jutland—international waters |
| HMS Delight | 2008 | 29 July 1940 | Second World War | Lyme Bay |
| RFA Dinsdale | 2026 | 31 May 1942 | | |
| HMS Duke of Albany | 2009 | 26 August 1916 | First World War | North Sea |
| HMS D5 | 2019 | 3 November 1914 | First World War | |
| Emile Deschamps | 2026 | 4 June 1940 | | |
| HMS Exmoor | 2006 | 25 February 1941 | Second World War | Lowestoft |
| HMS E6 | 2019 | 26 December 1915 | First World War | |
| HMS E18 | 2012 | 26 May 1916 | First World War | Estonia |
| HMS E47 | 2017 | 20 August 1917 | First World War | Netherlands; 53°6′8.10″N 4°33′28.0″E |
| HMS E49 | 2017 | 12 March 1917 | First World War | Shetland Islands |
| HMS E50 | 2012 | 31 January 1918 | First World War | North Sea – international waters |
| HMS Falmouth | 2017 | 20 August 1916 | First World War | Flamborough Head, Yorkshire; 53°58.93′N 0°4.50′W |
| HMS Fisgard II | 2009 | 17 September 1914 | Accidental loss in First World War | Portland Bill |
| HMS Fitzroy | 2009 | 27 May 1942 | Second World War | Great Yarmouth |
| HMS Fortuna | 2012 | 3 April 1941 | | |
| HMS Fortune | 2006 | 31 May 1916 | First World War, Battle of Jutland | Jutland—international waters |
| HMS Gloucester | 2002 | 22 May 1941 | Second World War | North of Crete; 35°50′N 23°0′E |
| HMS Ghurka | 2008 | 8 February 1918 | First World War | Dungeness |
| RFA Gray Ranger | 2026 | 22 September 1942 | | |
| HMS G8 | 2012 | 14 January 1918 | First World War | North Sea |
| HMS Hawke (1891) | 2026 | 15 October 1914 | | |
| HMS Hogue | 2017 | 22 September 1914 | First World War | North Sea |
| HMS Hood | 2002 | 24 May 1941 | Second World War | Denmark Strait; 63°20′N 31°50′W |
| RFA Hungerford | 2026 | 16 April 1918 | | |
| HMS Indefatigable | 2006 | 31 May 1916 | First World War, Battle of Jutland | Jutland—international waters |
| RFA Industry | 2026 | 18 October 1918 | | |
| HMS Invincible | 2006 | 31 May 1916 | First World War, Battle of Jutland | Jutland—international waters |
| HMY Iolaire | 2019 | 1 January 1919 | First World War | |
| RFA Isleford | 2012 | 25 January 1942 | | |
| HMS Jason (1892) | 2026 | 3 April 1917 | | |
| HMS Kale (1904) | 2026 | 27 March 1918 | | |
| HMS K4 | 2006 | 31 January 1918 | Accidental loss in First World War | Isle of May |
| HMS K17 | 2006 | 31 January 1918 | First World War | Isle of May |
| HMT Kurd | 2009 | 10 July 1945 | | Cornwall |
| HMS L24 | 2008 | 10 January 1924 | Accidental loss in peacetime | Portland Bill |
| HMS Lady Patricia | 2017 | 20 May 1917 | First World War | South-west Ireland; 51°42′N 13°13′W |
| HMS Laurentic | 2017 | 23 January 1917 | First World War | Lough Swilly, Ireland; 55.262°N 6.818°W |
| HMS Loyalty | 2008 | 22 August 1944 | Second World War | English Channel |
| HMS Lynx | 2012 | 9 August 1915 | First World War | Moray Firth |
| HMS M1 | 2006 | 12 November 1925 | Accidental loss in peacetime | English Channel; 49°59′N 3°56′W |
| HMS M2 | 2006 | 26 January 1932 | Accidental loss in peacetime | Lyme Bay; 50°34.6′N 2°33.93′W |
| SS Mendi | 2009 | 21 February 1917 | First World War | Isle of Wight; 50°28′0″N 1°33′0″W |
| ML-247 | 2026 | 29 September 1918 | | |
| HMS Moldavia | 2017 | 23 May 1917 | First World War | English Channel; 50°23.13′N 0°28.72′W |
| RFA Montenol | 2026 | 1 May 1942 | | |
| HMS Mourne | 2009 | 15 June 1944 | Second World War | English Channel |
| HMS Nestor | 2006 | 31 May 1916 | First World War, Battle of Jutland | Jutland—international waters |
| HMS Nomad | 2006 | 31 May 1916 | First World War, Battle of Jutland | Jutland—international waters |
| HMS Nottingham (1913) | 2026 | 19 August 1916 | | |
| HMS Pathfinder | 2009 | 5 September 1914 | First World War | St. Abbs Head |
| HMS Patia | 2012 | 27 April 1941 | | |
| HMS Penylan | 2008 | 3 December 1942 | Second World War | English Channel |
| HMS Pheasant | 2017 | 1 March 1917 | First World War | Orkney; 58°52.07′N 3°27.41′W |
| HMS Prince of Wales | 2002 | 10 December 1941 | Second World War | Off Kuantan, Malaysia; 3°33′36″N 104°28′42″E |
| HMS Queen Mary | 2006 | 31 May 1916 | First World War, Battle of Jutland | Jutland—international waters |
| HMS Recruit (1896) | 2026 | 1 May 1915 | | |
| HMS Repulse | 2002 | 10 December 1941 | Second World War | Off Kuantan, Malaysia; 3°33′36″N 104°28′42″E |
| HMS Shark | 2006 | 31 May 1916 | First World War, Battle of Jutland | Jutland—international waters 56°58′30″N 06°03′00″E |
| HMS Sheffield | 2006 | 9 May 1982 | Falklands War | Falkland Islands—international waters 53°04′S 56°56′W |
| RFA Salviking | 2026 | 14 February 1944 | | |
| RFA Sir Galahad | 2002 | 25 June 1982 | Falklands War | Falkland Islands; 51.841°S 58.211°W |
| RFA Slavol | 2026 | 26 March 1942 | | |
| HMS Sparrowhawk | 2006 | 31 May 1916 | First World War, Battle of Jutland | Jutland—international waters |
| SS Storaa | 2008 | 3 November 1943 | Second World War | Hastings |
| HMS Swordfish | 2006 | 7 November 1940 | Second World War | Isle of Wight; 50°28′N 1°21′W |
| USCG Tampa | 2026 | 26 September 1918 | | |
| TB-10 | 2026 | 10 June 1915 | | |
| TB-11 | 2026 | 7 March 1916 | | |
| HMS Tipperary | 2006 | 31 May 1916 | First World War, Battle of Jutland | Jutland—international waters |
| HMS Turbulent | 2006 | 31 May 1916 | First World War, Battle of Jutland | Jutland—international waters |
| HMT Ullswater | 2019 | 19 November 1942 | Second World War | |
| HMS Umpire | 2006 | 19 July 1941 | Second World War | Blakeney, Norfolk |
| HMS Vandal | 2006 | 24 February 1943 | Second World War | Lochranza Isle of Arran |
| HMS Vervain | 2009 | 20 February 1945 | Second World War | South Ireland |
| HMS Viknor | 2017 | 13 January 1915 | First World War | County Donegal, Ireland |
| HMS Vortigern | 2006 | 19 March 1942 | Second World War | Cromer |
| HMS Warrior | 2006 | 31 May 1916 | First World War, Battle of Jutland | Jutland—international waters |
| HMS Warwick | 2006 | 20 February 1944 | Second World War | Cornwall |
| U-12 | 2002 | 5 October 1939 | Second World War | Dover |
| U-714 | 2008 | 14 March 1945 | Second World War | Firth of Forth |
| U-1018 | 2012 | 27 February 1945 | Second World War | Cornwall |
| U-1063 | 2012 | 15 April 1945 | Second World War | Devon |
| SM UB-31 | 2019 | 2 May 1918 | First World War | |
| SM UB-41 | 2019 | 5 October 1917 | First World War | |
| SM UB-65 | 2006 | 14 July 1918 | First World War | North Cornwall |
| SM UB-75 | 2019 | 10 December 1917 | First World War | |
| SM UB-78 | 2019 | 19 April 1918 | First World War | |
| SM U-87 | 2019 | 25 December 1917 | First World War | |
| SM UB-107 | 2019 | 28 July 1918 | First World War | |
| SM UB-109 | 2019 | 29 August 1918 | First World War | |

== List of Controlled Sites designated under the Act ==
Controlled sites are specifically designated by location and no operations, such as diving, excavation or salvage, may be carried out without a license from the Ministry of Defence

Controlled Sites in the United Kingdom

| Name | Year designated | Date sank | Conflict | Location |
|---|---|---|---|---|
| HMS Affray | 2002 | 16 April 1951 | Accidental loss in peacetime | Isle of Wight; 49°50.023′N 2°23.843′W |
| HMS A7 | 2002 | 16 January 1914 | Accidental loss in peacetime | Whitsand Bay; 50°18.518′N 4°17.984′W |
| HMS Bulwark | 2002 | 26 November 1914 | Accidental loss in First World War | Sheerness; 51°25.392′N 0°39.172′E |
| HMS B2 | 2019 | 14 October 1912 | Accidental loss in peacetime | Strait of Dover; 51°07.153′N 1°27.587′E |
| HMS Cobra | 2026 | 18 September 1901 | Accidental loss in peacetime | North Sea; 53°27.000′N 1°7.00′E |
| HMS Dasher | 2002 | 27 March 1943 | Accidental loss in Second World War | River Clyde; 55°37.747′N 5°0.953′W |
| HMS Exmouth | 2002 | 21 January 1940 | Second World War | Moray Firth; 58°18.467′N 2°28.938′W |
| HMS Formidable | 2002 | 1 January 1915 | First World War | Torbay, Devon; 50°13.179′N 3°4.071′W |
| HMS H5 | 2002 | 6 March 1918 | First World War | Anglesey; 53°5.483′N 4°41.975′W |
| HMS Hampshire | 2002 (amended 2003) | 5 June 1916 | First World War | Scapa Flow; 59°7.065′N 3°23.843′W |
| HMS Natal | 2002 | 30 December 1915 | Accidental loss in First World War | Cromarty; 57°41.2415′N 4°5.3207′W |
| HMCS Regina (K234) | 2026 | 8 August 1944 | Second World War | Celtic Sea; 50°42.769′N 4°58.423′W |
| HMS Royal Oak | 2002 | 14 October 1939 | Second World War | Scapa Flow; 58°55.848′N 2°59.001′W |
| HMCS Trentonian | 2026 | 22 February 1945 | Second World War | English Channel; 50°7.037′N 4°44.609′W |
| SM UB-81 | 2002 | 5 January 1918 | First World War | Isle of Wight; 50°29.442′N 0°58.351′W |
| HMS Vanguard | 2002 | 9 July 1917 | Accidental loss in First World War | Scapa Flow; 58°51.4′N 3°6.405′W |
