= List of shipwrecks in December 1917 =

The list of shipwrecks in 1917 includes ships sunk, foundered, grounded, or otherwise lost during December 1917.

== 1 December ==
List of shipwrecks: 1 December 1917
Ship	State	Description
Antonios Stathatos	Greece	World War I: The cargo ship was sunk in the Bay of Biscay off the Île du Pilier, Vendée, France (47°05′N 2°36′W) by SM U-84 (Imperial German Navy).
Citta di Sassari	Italy	World War I: The passenger ship was sunk in the Tyrrhenian Sea off Cape Mele, Liguria (44°08′N 8°14′E) by SM U-65 (Imperial German Navy). Her crew survived.
Euphorbia	United Kingdom	World War I: The cargo ship was torpedoed and sunk in the English Channel 14 nautical miles (26 km) east by south of the Royal Sovereign Lightship (United Kingdom) by SM UC-75 (Imperial German Navy) with the loss of fourteen of her crew.
Phoebus	French Navy	World War I: The naval yacht/auxiliary minesweeper struck a mine and sank in the Mediterranean Sea off Cape Cepet, Var (43°10′N 5°20′E).
Rion	United Kingdom	World War I: The fishing smack was scuttled in the English Channel 8 nautical miles (15 km) north east of Start Point, Devon by SM UB-35 (Imperial German Navy). Her crew survived.
Rydal Hall	United Kingdom	World War I: The cargo ship was torpedoed and sunk in the English Channel 14 nautical miles (26 km) east by south of the Royal Sovereign Lightship (United Kingdom) by SM UC-75 (Imperial German Navy) with the loss of 23 of her crew.
Vind	Sweden	The cargo steamer was last heard from departing Lerwick bound for Gothenburg. Nineteen casualties.
USS Washington	United States Navy	The coal barge ran aground in the Ambrose Channel and was wrecked.

== 2 December ==
List of shipwrecks: 2 December 1917
Ship	State	Description
Berwick Law	United Kingdom	World War I: The cargo ship was torpedoed and sunk in the Mediterranean Sea off Cape Ténès, Algeria by SM U-34 (Imperial German Navy) with the loss of a crew member.
Birchgrove	United Kingdom	World War I: The cargo ship was torpedoed and sunk in the Bay of Biscay off Groix, Morbihan, France (47°38′N 3°45′W) by SM U-84 (Imperial German Navy) with the loss of a crew member.
Carlino	Italy	World War I: The sailing vessel was sunk in the Tyrrhenian Sea east of Corsica, France (42°08′N 7°27′E) by SM U-65 (Imperial German Navy).
Heinrich Horn	Germany	The cargo vessel stranded in the North Sea at Langeoog, East Frisian Islands, Germany and was wrecked, later scrapped
Kintuck	United Kingdom	World War I: The cargo ship was torpedoed and sunk in the Atlantic Ocean 8 nautical miles (15 km) north west by north of the Godrevy Lighthouse, Cornwall by a Kaiserliche Marine submarine with the loss of a crew member.
La Margherita	Italy	World War I: The sailing vessel was sunk in the Tyrrhenian Sea east of Corsica (42°11′N 7°20′E) by SM U-65 (Imperial German Navy).
La Rance	France	World War I: The cargo ship was torpedoed, shelled and sunk in the Mediterranean Sea off the Île de Planier, Bouches-du-Rhône (42°48′N 5°15′E) by SM UC-67 (Imperial German Navy) with the loss of four of her crew.
HMT Lord Grey	Royal Navy	The naval trawler was wrecked on the La Barrier Shoal, in the English Channel off Cap Gris Nez, Pas-de-Calais, France.
Minas	Greece	World War I: The cargo ship was sunk in the Mediterranean Sea off Cape Ténès by SM U-34 (Imperial German Navy). Her crew survived.
Molesey	United Kingdom	World War I: The cargo ship was torpedoed and sunk in the English Channel 12 nautical miles (22 km) south west by west of the Brighton Lightship (United Kingdom) by a Kaiserliche Marine submarine.
San Antonio Il Vittorioso	Italy	World War I: The sailing vessel was sunk in the Tyrrhenian Sea east of Corsica (42°16′N 7°20′E) by SM U-65 (Imperial German Navy).
Tasmania	Russia	World War I: The full-rigged ship was sunk in the Bay of Biscay south west of Ouessant, Finistère, France by SM UC-17 (Imperial German Navy).
SM UB-81	Imperial German Navy	World War I: The Type UB III submarine struck a mine and sank in the English Channel off Dunnose Head, Isle of Wight, United Kingdom, then was rammed by a Royal Navy patrol boat with the loss of either 27 of her 34 crew or 29 of her 35 crew (sources differ). The survivors were rescued by a Royal Navy patrol boat.

== 3 December ==
List of shipwrecks: 3 December 1917
Ship	State	Description
Carmen	Italy	World War I: The cargo ship was sunk in the Mediterranean Sea south of the Île du Planier, Bouches-du-Rhône, France (43°05′N 5°12′E) by SM UC-67 (Imperial German Navy).
Copeland	United Kingdom	World War I: The cargo ship was sunk in the Atlantic Ocean 5 nautical miles (9.3 km) south south west of the Tuskar Rock, Ireland (52°03′N 6°25′W) by SM U-57 (Imperial German Navy) with the loss of twelve crew.
Livonia	United Kingdom	World War I: The cargo ship was torpedoed and sunk in the English Channel 4 nautical miles (7.4 km) east by north of Start Point, Devon by SM UB-35 (Imperial German Navy) with the loss of 23 of her crew.
Melo	Italy	World War I: The cargo ship struck a mine and sank in the Mediterranean Sea off Cape Spartivento, E. of Sicily with the loss of two of her crew.
Unknown pile driver	United States	The pile driver capsized at Bayles Shipyard, Port Jefferson, New York.
Wreathier	United Kingdom	World War I: The coaster was torpedoed and sunk in the English Channel 1 nautical mile (1.9 km) west of Prawle Point, Devon by SM UB-35 (Imperial German Navy) with the loss of three of her crew.

== 4 December ==
List of shipwrecks: 4 December 1917
Ship	State	Description
Alberto Verderame	Italy	World War I: The brigantine was shelled and sunk in the Gulf of Genoa (39°57′N 9°48′E) by SM UC-35 (Imperial German Navy).
HMT Bounteous	Royal Navy	The naval trawler was lost on this date.
Brigitta	United Kingdom	World War I: The cargo ship struck a mine and sank in the English Channel 6 nautical miles (11 km) south west of the Nab Lightship (United Kingdom) with the loss of two of her crew.
Dowlais	United Kingdom	World War I: The cargo ship was torpedoed and sunk in the Mediterranean Sea off Cape de Fer, Algeria by SM UB-48 (Imperial German Navy) with the loss of 26 of her crew.
Eagle	United Kingdom	World War I: The coaster was scuttled in the English Channel 10 nautical miles (19 km) south of Start Point, Devon by SM UB-35 (Imperial German Navy). Her crew survived.
Forfar	United Kingdom	World War I: Convoy OF 15: The cargo ship was torpedoed and sunk in the Atlantic Ocean 115 nautical miles (213 km) south west by west of The Lizard by SM UC-17 (Imperial German Navy) with the loss of three of her crew.
Gerasimos	Greece	World War I: The cargo ship was sunk in the Mediterranean Sea off Cap de Fer by SM UB-48 (Imperial German Navy).
Helge	Sweden	World War I: The coaster was shelled and sunk in the English Channel 6 nautical miles (11 km) north of Guernsey, Channel Islands at (48°49′N 2°45′W) by SM UB-35 (Imperial German Navy). Her crew survived.
Vav	Norway	World War I: The cargo ship was sunk in the English Channel 1 nautical mile (1.9 km) south of The Lizard, Cornwall, United Kingdom by SM UB-80 (Imperial German Navy) with the loss of nineteen of her crew.

== 5 December ==
List of shipwrecks: 5 December 1917
Ship	State	Description
Aigburth	United Kingdom	World War I: The coaster was torpedoed and sunk in the North Sea 2 nautical miles (3.7 km) off Robin Hood's Bay, Yorkshire by SM UB-75 (Imperial German Navy) with the loss of eleven of her crew.
Armenia	United States	World War I: The cargo liner was torpedoed and damaged in the English Channel 20 nautical miles (37 km) east of Start Point, Devon, United Kingdom by SM UB-80 (Imperial German Navy). She was beached but was later refloated and returned to service by the beginning of February.
Greenwich	United Kingdom	World War I: The cargo ship was torpedoed and sunk in the Mediterranean Sea 9 nautical miles (17 km) south of the Île du Planier, Bouches-du-Rhône, France (43°04′N 5°12′E) by SM UC-67 (Imperial German Navy). Her crew survived.
HMT Helen Wilson	Royal Navy	The naval trawler was lost on this date.
Seaforth	United Kingdom	The ship struck the wreck of the Franklin (United Kingdom) and foundered in the Bristol Channel. Her eleven crew were rescued. The wreck was raised in April 1918.

== 6 December ==
List of shipwrecks: 6 December 1917
Ship	State	Description
Ambiorix	Belgium	The cargo ship sank in the English Channel (49°59′N 1°13′W) after a collision with Primo (Norway).
HMT Apley	Royal Navy	World War I: The naval trawler struck a mine and sank in the English Channel east of the Isle of Wight (50°37′N 0°56′W) with the loss of eleven of her crew.
Asaba	United Kingdom	World War I: The coaster was torpedoed and sunk in the English Channel 2 nautical miles (3.7 km) west south west of The Lizard, Cornwall by SM UC-17 (Imperial German Navy) with the loss of sixteen of her crew.
Braeside	United Kingdom	World War I: The coaster was torpedoed and sunk in the English Channel 5 nautical miles (9.3 km) south of the Owers Lightship (United Kingdom) by SM UC-71 (Imperial German Navy) with the loss of all eleven crew.
Curaca	United Kingdom	Halifax Explosion: The cargo ship was sunk at Dartmouth, Nova Scotia, Canada by the explosion of Mont-Blanc (France) with the loss of 45 of her 46 crew. She was later refloated, repaired and returned to service.
Ilvington Court	United Kingdom	World War I: The collier was torpedoed and sunk in the Mediterranean Sea 8 nautical miles (15 km) north west by west of Cape Cherchell, Algeria (36°43′N 2°06′E) by SM U-34 (Imperial German Navy) with the loss of eight crew.
Imo	Norway	Imo Halifax Explosion: The cargo ship collided with Mont-Blanc (France) at Halifax, Nova Scotia, Canada. Mont-Blanc caught fire and was obliterated in a massive explosion that killed approximately 2,000 people and drove Imo ashore. Imo subsequently was refloated on 26 April 1918, repaired, and returned to service.
USS Jacob Jones	United States Navy	World War I: The Tucker-class destroyer was torpedoed and sank in the Atlantic Ocean, 30 miles (48 km) south of the Isles of Scilly, United Kingdom (49°53′N 6°50′W) by U-53 (Imperial German Navy). Sixty-six of the crew were killed, two were taken prisoner. The wreck was discovered in 400 feet (120 m) of water in 2022.
Leda	Netherlands	World War I: The cargo ship was sunk in the North Sea (54°12′N 0°08′W) by SM UB-75 (Imperial German Navy).
Mont-Blanc	France	The pyrocumulus cloud generated by the explosion of Mont Blanc, photographed an estimated 15 to 20 seconds after the explosion from an estimated 21 km (13 miles) away. Halifax Explosion: The cargo ship collided with Imo (Norway) at Halifax, Nova Scotia, Canada, causing Mont-Blanc to catch fire and explode. The explosion obliterated Mont Blanc, devastated Halifax′s Richmond district, and killed approximately 2,000 people.
Sambro	Canada	Halifax Explosion: The tug was sunk by the explosion of Mont-Blanc (France). She was refloated in 1927, repaired and returned to service.
Stella Maris	Canada	Halifax Explosion: The tug was severely damaged by the explosion of Mont-Blanc (France), which she was towing. Subsequently repaired and returned to service.
Tubereuse	French Navy	World War I: The naval trawler struck a mine and sank in the Gulf of Patras with the loss of 24 of her crew.
Tuscarora	United States	The steamer struck rocks off the south east point of Saint Paul Island and sank with all 30 hands.
SM UC-69	Imperial German Navy	The Type UC II submarine collided with SM U-96 (Imperial German Navy) at Barfleur, Manche, France (49°47′N 1°10′W) and sank with the loss of eleven of her crew.
Wyndhurst	United Kingdom	World War I: The coaster was torpedoed and sunk in the English Channel 30 nautical miles (56 km) south of St. Catherine's Point, Isle of Wight by SM UC-71 (Imperial German Navy) with the loss of eleven of her crew.

== 7 December ==
List of shipwrecks: 7 December 1917
Ship	State	Description
Earl of Elgin	United Kingdom	World War I: The cargo ship was torpedoed and sunk in the Irish Sea 10 nautical miles (19 km) west by south of the Caernarvon Bay Lightship (United Kingdom) by SM UC-75 (Imperial German Navy) with the loss of eighteen of her crew.
Highgate	United Kingdom	World War I: The cargo ship was torpedoed and sunk in the North Sea 2.5 nautical miles (4.6 km) east of Robin Hood's Bay, Yorkshire by SM UB-75 (Imperial German Navy). Her crew survived.
Proba	United Kingdom	World War I: The schooner was scuttled in the English Channel three nautical miles (5.6 km) south east of The Lizard, Cornwall (49°56′N 5°08′W) by SM UB-55 (Imperial German Navy). Her crew survived.
Simcoe	Canada	The supply vessel foundered off the Magdalen Islands. 44 people lost.
W. C. McKay	Canada	World War I: The schooner was scuttled in the Atlantic Ocean north east of the Azores, Portugal (40°57′N 18°16′W) by SM U-156 (Imperial German Navy) with the loss of all six of her crew.

== 8 December ==
List of shipwrecks: 8 December 1917
Ship	State	Description
Chippewa	United States	The lighter barge, under tow of Charles A. McCaffery (United States), foundered in a severe snowstorm off Point Judith, Rhode Island. Her captain and his two young children died.
Consols	United Kingdom	World War I: The cargo ship was torpedoed and damaged in the Mediterranean Sea 40 nautical miles (74 km) north west of Cape Bon, Algeria by SM UB-48 (Imperial German Navy) with the loss of three of her crew. She was shelled and sunk the next day.
Corinto	Norway	World War I: The coaster was sunk in the Atlantic Ocean 26 nautical miles (48 km) north of Ouessant, Finistère, France (48°53′N 5°17′W) by SM UB-55 (Imperial German Navy). Her crew survived.
Desmond	United States	The sucker dredge capsized and sank after sand shifted in a severe gale off the South Chicago light. Her captain froze to death and six other crew died. Six crew were rescued by William A. Field (United States).
Eugene F. Moran	United States	The tow steamer, with three barges in tow, foundered in a severe gale 2 or 3 miles (3.2 or 4.8 km) off Atlantic City, New Jersey, or Aberdeen, New Jersey. Lost with all 11 or 13 hands.
Giuseppe Naccari	Italy	World War I: The brigantine was scuttled in the Mediterranean Sea 19 nautical miles (35 km) north of Marettimo (38°36′N 12°00′E) by SM UC-53 (Imperial German Navy).
HMS Grive	Royal Navy	World War I: The armed boarding steamer was torpedoed and damaged in the North Sea off Lerwick, Shetland Islands. She was beached but subsequently foundered on 24 December four nautical miles (7.4 km) east north east of the North Ronaldsay Lighthouse, Orkney Islands whilst under tow.
Lampada	United Kingdom	World War I: The cargo ship was torpedoed and sunk in the North Sea three nautical miles (5.6 km) north of Whitby, Yorkshire by SM UB-75 (Imperial German Navy) with the loss of five of her crew.
La Vittoria	Italy	World War I: The sailing vessel was sunk in the Mediterranean Sea south of Sardinia by SM UC-67 (Imperial German Navy).
Madison	United States	The barge, under tow of Charles A. McCaffery (United States), foundered in a severe snowstorm off Point Judith, Rhode Island. Her captain died.
Marion B	United States	The lighter barge, under tow of Charles A. McCaffery (United States), foundered in a severe snowstorm off Point Judith, Rhode Island. Her captain and his wife died.
Maindy Bridge	United Kingdom	World War I: The cargo ship was torpedoed and sunk in the North Sea four nautical miles (7.4 km) east north east of Sunderland, County Durham (55°01′N 1°18′W) by SM UC-49 (Imperial German Navy) with the loss of two of her crew.
Nonni	Russia	World War I: The cargo ship was sunk in the Atlantic Ocean off Brest, Finistère (48°53′N 4°28′W) by SM UB-18 (Imperial German Navy).
Poitou	French Navy	The auxiliary minesweeper was lost on this date.
USS Rush	United States Navy	The patrol vessel struck a submerged log at League Island Navy Yard and sank. She was declared a total loss.

== 9 December ==
List of shipwrecks: 9 December 1917
Ship	State	Description
Adour	Norway	World War I: The cargo ship was sunk in the Mediterranean Sea two nautical miles (3.7 km) off the Isla Horminga Lighthouse, Spain (37°40′N 0°34′W) by SM U-64 (Imperial German Navy) with the loss of two crew.
Costas	Greece	World War I: The cargo ship was sunk in the Mediterranean Sea off Cape Vaticano, Italy (38°44′N 15°34′E) by SM UC-53 (Imperial German Navy). Her crew survived.
Lancaster	United States	The schooner barge, under tow of Georges Creek (United States), foundered in a severe gale eight miles (13 km) south south west of the Winter Quarter Light. Lost with all four hands.
SM UB-18	Imperial German Navy	World War I: The Type UB II submarine was rammed and sunk in the English Channel (49°17′N 5°47′W) by HMT Ben Lawer (Royal Navy) with the loss of all 24 crew.
Venetia	United Kingdom	World War I: The collier was torpedoed and sunk in the North Sea 3 nautical miles (5.6 km) north north west of Whitby, Yorkshire (54°32′N 0°39′W) by SM UB-75 (Imperial German Navy). Her crew survived.
War Tune	United Kingdom	World War I: The cargo ship was torpedoed and sunk in the English Channel 1.5 nautical miles (2.8 km) south south east of Black Head, Cornwall (49°59′N 5°05′W) by SM U-53 (Imperial German Navy) with the loss of a crew member.

== 10 December ==
List of shipwrecks: 10 December 1917
Ship	State	Description
Antonio Magliulo	Italy	World War I: The sailing vessel was shelled and sunk in the Tyrrhenian Sea west of Naples (40°35′N 13°18′E) by SM UC-53 (Imperial German Navy).
Codorus	United States	The steamer was stranded in a storm on Escamanic Point near Chatham, New Brunswick in the Gulf of St. Lawrence. Considered a total loss at the time, she was refloated in 1919.
Crathorne	Norway	World War I: The cargo ship was torpedoed and sunk in the Mediterranean Sea off Alicante, Spain (38°28′N 0°01′W) by SM U-64 (Imperial German Navy) with the loss of three of her crew.
Dredge No. 1	United States	The dredge sank at New London, Connecticut.
Forward	United Kingdom	World War I: The fishing smack was scuttled in the North Sea off Aldeburgh, Suffolk by SM UB-17 (Imperial German Navy). Her crew survived.
Øiekast	Norway	World War I: The coaster was sunk in the English Channel 25 nautical miles (46 km) north east of Barfleur, Manche, France by SM U-53 (Imperial German Navy). Her crew survived.
Owasco	United States	World War I: The cargo ship was sunk in the Mediterranean Sea off Alicante (38°28′N 0°13′W) by SM U-64 (Imperial German Navy) with the loss of two of her crew.
SM UB-75	Imperial German Navy	World War I: The Type UB III submarine struck a mine and sank in the North Sea off Scarborough, Yorkshire, United Kingdom with the loss of all 34 crew.
SMS Wien	Austro-Hungarian Navy	World War I: The Monarch-class coastal defense ship was torpedoed and sunk at Trieste, Italy by two Regia Marina torpedo boats with the loss of 46 of her 469 crew.
Unity	United States	The 17-gross register ton, 39.5-foot (12.0 m) fishing vessel was wrecked on Outer Point on the northwest end of Douglas Island in Southeast Alaska during a gale and snowstorm. All four crewmen survived.

== 11 December ==
List of shipwrecks: 11 December 1917
Ship	State	Description
Argus	Portugal	World War I: The fishing vessel was sunk in the Atlantic Ocean off Leixões by SM UB-55 (Imperial German Navy).
Bard	Norway	World War I: The coaster was torpedoed and sunk in the Atlantic Ocean off St. Agnes Head, Cornwall, United Kingdom (50°19′N 5°22′W) by SM U-60 (Imperial German Navy) with the loss of seven crew.
D. A. Gordon	United Kingdom	World War I: The cargo ship was torpedoed and sunk in the Mediterranean Sea off Alicante, Spain (38°22′N 0°19′W) by SM U-64 (Imperial German Navy) with the loss of a crew member.
Ligeiro	Portugal	World War I: The fishing vessel was sunk in the Atlantic Ocean off Leixões by SM UB-55 (Imperial German Navy).
Minorca	United Kingdom	World War I: The cargo ship was torpedoed and sunk in the Mediterranean Sea off Cabo de las Huertas, Spain by SM U-64 (Imperial German Navy). Her crew survived.
Oldfield Grange	United Kingdom	World War I: The cargo ship was torpedoed and sunk in the Atlantic Ocean 30 nautical miles (56 km) north east of Tory Island, County Donegal (55°46′N 7°56′W) by SM U-62 (Imperial German Navy). Her crew survived.
Persier	United Kingdom	World War I: The collier was torpedoed and sunk in the Mediterranean Sea 50 nautical miles (93 km) east of Cape Spartivento, Calabria, Italy (ERROR - Coords. wrong) - (37°58′N 17°09′E) by SM U-35 (Imperial German Navy) with the loss of a crew member.
Portuguesa	Portugal	World War I: The sailing vessel was sunk in the Atlantic Ocean off Leixões by SM UB-55 (Imperial German Navy).
Vigneira (or Virgeira)	Portugal	World War I: The fishing vessel was sunk in the Atlantic Ocean off Leixões by SM UB-55 (Imperial German Navy).

== 12 December ==
List of shipwrecks: 12 December 1917
Ship	State	Description
Amadavat	United Kingdom	World War I: The trawler struck a mine and sank in the North Sea east of the Shetland Islands with the loss of nine crew.
Bellville	Sweden	World War I: The barque was scuttled in the Atlantic Ocean south west of the Tuskar Rock (51°42′N 6°19′W) by SM UB-65 (Imperial German Navy). Her crew survived.
Cavour	Italy	The passenger ship collided with the auxiliary cruiser Caprera (Italy) 2.5 nautical miles (4.6 km) off L'Ametlla de Mar, Catalonia, Spain and sank.
Charleston	United Kingdom	World War I: The collier was scuttled in St. George's Channel 30 nautical miles (56 km) west of The Smalls (51°37′N 5°59′W) by SM UB-65 (Imperial German Navy). Her crew survived, but two of them were taken as prisoners of war.
HMT Commander Fullerton	Royal Navy	World War I: The naval trawler was shelled and sunk in the Norwegian Sea by SMS G101, SMS G103, SMS G104 and SMS V100 (all Imperial German Navy).
Cordova	United Kingdom	World War I: The cargo ship was torpedoed and sunk in the Norwegian Sea 50 nautical miles (93 km) west of Bergen, Rogaland, Norway by SMS G101, SMS G103, SMS G104 and SMS V100 (all Imperial German Navy).
USS Elizabeth	United States Navy	The patrol vessel collided with Northland (United States) at Norfolk, Virginia and sank. Two crew killed. She was subsequently salvaged, repaired and returned to service.
Emanuele C.	Italy	World War I: The schooner was shelled and sunk in the Mediterranean Sea off Cape Bougaroun, Algeria (37°37′N 8°30′E) by SM U-34 (Imperial German Navy). Her crew survived.
Emlyndene	United Kingdom	World War I: The coaster was torpedoed and sunk in the English Channel east of Start Point, Devon by SM UC-50 (Imperial German Navy) with the loss of all fourteen of her crew.
Francis Blanchflower	United Kingdom	World War I: The trawler was shelled and sunk in the North Sea by three Imperial German Navy destroyers with the loss of four of her eight crew.
John M. Smart	United Kingdom	World War I: The trawler was shelled and sunk in the North Sea 10 nautical miles (19 km) east of the mouth of the River Tyne by an Imperial German Navy torpedo boat destroyer with the loss of four of her crew.
Leonatus	United Kingdom	World War I: The cargo ship was torpedoed and sunk in the North Sea 2 nautical miles (3.7 km) east by south of the Bressay Lighthouse, Shetland Islands by SM UC-40 (Imperial German Navy). Her crew survived.
HMT Livingstone	Royal Navy	World War I: The naval trawler was torpedoed, shelled and sunk in the Norwegian Sea by SMS G101, SMS G103, SMS G104 and SMS V100 (all Imperial German Navy).
HMT Lord Alverstone	Royal Navy	The naval trawler was shelled and sunk in the Norwegian Sea by SMS G101, SMS G103, SMS G104 and SMS V100 (all Imperial German Navy).
Maracaibo	Denmark	World War I: The cargo ship was shelled and sunk in the Norwegian Sea 50 nautical miles (93 km) west of Bergen by SMS G101, SMS G103, SMS G104 and SMS V100 (all Imperial German Navy).
Nike	Sweden	World War I: The cargo ship was torpedoed and sunk with the loss of sixteen crew in the North Sea 8 nautical miles (15 km) east of Blyth, Northumberland by SMS B97 and SMS B111 (both Imperial German Navy).
HMS Partridge	Royal Navy	World War I: The Admiralty M-class destroyer was shelled and sunk in the Norwegian Sea by SMS G101, SMS G103, SMS G104 and SMS V100 (all Imperial German Navy). Twenty four survivors were rescued by the Germans.
St. Croix	Norway	World War I: The cargo liner was torpedoed and damaged in the Bristol Channel 13 nautical miles (24 km) north west of Hartland Point, Devon, United Kingdom (50°49′N 4°49′W) by SM U-60 (Imperial German Navy) with the loss of two crew. She was taken under tow but sank the next day 10 nautical miles (19 km) south west by west of Hartland Point.
HMT Tokio	Royal Navy	World War I: The naval trawler was shelled and sunk in the Norwegian Sea by SMS G101, SMS G103, SMS G104 and SMS V100 (all Imperial German Navy).
Torleif	Sweden	World War I: The cargo ship was shelled and sunk in the Norwegian Sea (59°43′N 4°10′E) by SMS G101, SMS G103, SMS G104 and SMS V100 (all Imperial German Navy).
HMS Wolverine	Royal Navy	The Beagle-class destroyer collided with HMS Rosemary (Royal Navy) in the Atlantic Ocean north west of Ireland and sank.

== 13 December ==
List of shipwrecks: 13 December 1917
Ship	State	Description
Arnewood	United Kingdom	World War I: The collier struck a mine and sank in the Atlantic Ocean four nautical miles (7.4 km; 4.6 mi) east south east of Sleat Point, Skye (57°01′N 5°54′W). Her crew survived.
August Demarest	United States	The canal boat went ashore on, or sank at, Duck Island, Connecticut, or Kelsey Point, Connecticut. She went to pieces before salvage could be attempted.
Bangarth	United Kingdom	World War I: The collier was torpedoed and sunk in the North Sea 13 nautical miles (24 km; 15 mi) north north east of the mouth of the River Tyne by SM UB-34 (Imperial German Navy) with the loss of two of her crew.
Britannic	United Kingdom	World War I: The sailing vessel was scuttled in the English Channel 12 nautical miles (22 km; 14 mi) north north west of the Les Hanois Lighthouse, Guernsey, Channel Islands (49°36′N 2°53′W) by SM UB-31 (Imperial German Navy). Her crew survived.
Chili	France	World War I: The barque was damaged in the Atlantic Ocean 100 nautical miles (190 km; 120 mi) west of Ouessant, Finistère by SM UB-54 (Imperial German Navy). She sank the next day.
Danif	United States	The barge sank at South Norwalk, Connecticut.
E. R. Tatnall	United States	The barge sank off South Norwalk, Connecticut.
Garthwaite	United Kingdom	World War I: The cargo ship was torpedoed and sunk in the North Sea four nautical miles (7.4 km; 4.6 mi) east of Whitby, Yorkshire by SM UB-22 (Imperial German Navy) with the loss of fourteen crew.
Karen	Norway	World War I: The cargo ship was sunk in the Mediterranean Sea five nautical miles (9.3 km; 5.8 mi) off Porto Anzio, Italy by SM UC-53 (Imperial German Navy) with the loss of a crew member.
Little Gem	United Kingdom	World War I: The schooner was sunk in the English Channell west of the Casquets, Channel Islands by SM U-87 (Imperial German Navy) with the loss of five of her crew.
Noviembre	Spain	World War I: The cargo ship was sunk in the Bay of Biscay ten nautical miles (19 km; 12 mi) off the mouth of the Gironde River, France (45°24′N 1°37′W) by SM U-102 (Imperial German Navy). Her crew survived.
Ottokar	United Kingdom	World War I: The coaster was sunk in the North Sea off Whitby by SM UB-38 (Imperial German Navy). Her crew survived.
Paris II	French Navy	World War I: The naval trawler/patrol ship was shelled and sunk by Turkish coastal artillery off Cape Avova.
Sha	Imperial Russian Navy	The transport ship ran aground in the Baltic Sea off Stirsudden, Finland. She was abandoned as a total loss on 7 January 1918.
HMS Stephen Furness	Royal Navy	World War I: The 88-metre (289 ft) armed boarding steamer was sunk in the Irish Sea in 90 metres (300 ft) of water, 10 miles (16 km) east of the entrance to Strangford Lough, Northern Ireland by SM UB-64 (Imperial German Navy) with the loss of 101 lives.
SM U-75	Imperial German Navy	World War I: The Type UE I submarine struck a mine and sank in the North Sea off Terschelling, Friesland, Netherlands with the loss of 23 of her crew.
Vermont	United States	The canal boat went ashore on, or sank at, Duck Island, Connecticut or Kelsey Point, Connecticut.
Virginia	United States	The canal boat sank at Duck Island, Connecticut or Kelsey Point, Connecticut.
William M. Moran	United States	The barge sank off South Norwalk, Connecticut.

== 14 December ==
List of shipwrecks: 14 December 1917
Ship	State	Description
Châteaurenault	French Navy	World War I: The protected cruiser was torpedoed and sunk in the Mediterranean Sea (38°15′N 20°22′E) by SM UC-38 (Imperial German Navy). The 1,162 survivors were rescued by Lansquenet, Mameluck and Rouen (all French Navy).
Coila	United Kingdom	World War I: The cargo ship was torpedoed and sunk in the Mediterranean Sea 3 nautical miles (5.6 km) south east of Canet Point, Spain (39°37′N 0°08′E) by SM U-64 (Imperial German Navy) with the loss of three of her crew.
George N. Orr	United States	The steamer was wrecked/sank on the north shore of Prince Edward Island near Savage Harbour in heavy seas, breaking in two and sinking in eight feet (2.4 m) of water, a total loss. Various dates of 7, 9, 14, and 17 December are listed in sources.
Hare	United Kingdom	World War I: The coaster was torpedoed and sunk in the Irish Sea 7 nautical miles (13 km) off the Kish Lightship (United Kingdom) by SM U-62 (Imperial German Navy) with the loss of twelve crew.
Nor	Norway	World War I: The cargo ship was sunk in the Irish Sea (52°45′N 5°43′W) by SM UB-65 (Imperial German Navy) with the loss of two of her crew.
SM UC-38	Imperial German Navy	World War I: The Type UC II submarine was depth charged and sunk in the Mediterranean Sea (38°15′N 20°22′E) by Lansquenet (French Navy). There were twenty survivors.
Volnay	United Kingdom	World War I: The cargo ship struck a mine and sank in the Atlantic Ocean 2 nautical miles (3.7 km) south of The Manacles (50°04′N 5°03′W). Her crew survived.

== 15 December ==
List of shipwrecks: 15 December 1917
Ship	State	Description
Bernard	United Kingdom	World War I: The cargo ship was torpedoed and sunk in the Atlantic Ocean 180 nautical miles (330 km; 210 mi) west south west of the Bishop Rock, Isles of Scilly (48°40′N 9°58′W) by SM U-94 (Imperial German Navy) with the loss of a crew member.
Dafni	Greece	World War I: The cargo ship was sunk in the North Sea three nautical miles (5.6 km; 3.5 mi) north north east of Hartlepool, County Durham, United Kingdom (54°44′N 1°09′W) by SM UB-34 (Imperial German Navy). Her crew survived.
Edward E. Briry	United States	Carrying a cargo of coal, the 228-foot (69 m), 1,613-gross register ton four-masted schooner sank during a gale without loss of life in up to 50 feet (15 m) of water on the south side of Little Round Shoal, 6 nautical miles (11 km; 6.9 mi) north-northeast of Great Point, Nantucket, Massachusetts, at 41°29′N 069°56′W.
Formby	United Kingdom	World War I: The passenger ship was sunk in the Irish Sea 20 nautical miles (37 km; 23 mi) north west of Bardsey Island, by SM U-62 (Imperial German Navy) with the loss of all 35 crew.
Ioannina	Greece	World War I: The cargo ship was scuttled in the Atlantic Ocean 150 nautical miles (280 km; 170 mi) north west of Madeira, Portugal (34°40′N 19°45′W) by SM U-156 (Imperial German Navy).
Maidag	Norway	World War I: The cargo ship was torpedoed and sunk in the Atlantic Ocean 22 nautical miles (41 km; 25 mi) south of the Wolf Rock, Cornwall, United Kingdom (49°36′N 5°36′W) by SM U-104 (Imperial German Navy) with the loss of three crew.
Maréchal Davout	France	World War I: The A Type Ch. de La Loire-class barque was sunk by SMS Wolf (Imperial German Navy) in the South Atlantic.

== 16 December ==
List of shipwrecks: 16 December 1917
Ship	State	Description
HMS Arbutus	Royal Navy	World War I: The Anchusa-class sloop, operating as a Q-ship, was sunk in St. George's Channel (51°37′N 5°24′W) by SM UB-65 (Imperial German Navy) with the loss of nine of her crew.
Bristol City	United Kingdom	World War I: The cargo ship was sunk in the Atlantic Ocean 250 nautical miles (460 km) west of Ouessant, Finistère, France (46°38′N 10°28′W) by SM U-94 (Imperial German Navy) with the loss of 30 of her crew.
Foylemore	United Kingdom	World War I: The cargo ship was torpedoed and sunk in the English Channel 22 nautical miles (41 km) east of The Lizard, Cornwall (49°58′N 4°38′W) by SM UB-55 (Imperial German Navy). Her crew survived.
Greenhill	United Kingdom	The collier was lost.
New York	Italy	World War I: The brigantine was shelled and sunk in the Mediterranean Sea off Cape San Vito, Sicily (38°14′N 12°55′E) by SM UB-49 (Imperial German Navy).
Pilot	United States	The pilot boat became entangled in a submarine net while attempting to enter the inner harbor at Hampton Roads, Virginia. Before she could free herself, the steamer Berkshire (United States) collided with and sank her without loss of life.
San Francesco di Paola	Italy	World War I: The sailing vessel was sunk in the Mediterranean Sea off Cape San Vito by SM UB-49 (Imperial German Navy).
Saranac	United States	The steamer went ashore on McNab Island, near Halifax, Nova Scotia. Refloated and returned to service.

== 17 December ==
List of shipwrecks: 17 December 1917
Ship	State	Description
Acoria	Portugal	World War I: The schooner was scuttled in the Atlantic Ocean south east of the Azores (35°10′N 18°20′W) by SM U-156 (Imperial German Navy). Her crew survived.
Cambridge	United States	The dredge went ashore and sank near Point Judith, Rhode Island.
Coningbeg	United Kingdom	World War I: The cargo ship was sunk in the Irish Sea 20 nautical miles (37 km) south west of Bardsey Island, by SM U-62 (Imperial German Navy) with the loss of all fifteen crew.
HMT Duster	Royal Navy	The naval trawler was wrecked in Scratten Cove, Portreath, Cornwall.
USS F-1	United States Navy	The F-class submarine sank in the Pacific Ocean after a collision with USS F-3 (United States Navy) off Point Loma, California. Nineteen of her 22 crew were killed.
Henry Cort	United States	The whaleback steamer was sunk in a collision with Midvale (flag unknown) while breaking ice 4 1/2 miles (7.2 km) off Colchester Reef in Lake Erie in 30 feet (9.1 m) of water. Her crew walked across the ice to Midvale. She was located on 24 April 1918, 4 miles (6.4 km) from where she sank, in only 7 feet (2.1 m) of water. She was raised on 22 September 1918, repaired and returned to service.
Hugh Hawn	United States	The pile driver went ashore and sank near Point Judith, Rhode Island.
Neptune	United Kingdom	World War I: The fishing smack struck a mine and sank in the Atlantic Ocean 4.5 nautical miles (8.3 km) north of Black Head, County Clare with the loss of four crew.
Nina	Greece	World War I: The sailing vessel was sunk in the Mediterranean Sea south east of Crete (34°36′N 27°16′E) by SM UB-53 (Imperial German Navy).

== 18 December ==
List of shipwrecks: 18 December 1917
Ship	State	Description
Charles	United Kingdom	World War I: The sailing vessel was shelled and sunk in the English Channel by a Kaiserliche Marine submarine SM U-90 with the loss of three of her crew. (Note: Incorrect date for the action i British Vessels Lost at Sea 1914-18)
Riversdale	United Kingdom	World War I: The cargo ship was torpedoed and sunk in the English Channel 1 nautical mile (1.9 km) south of Prawle Point, Devon by SM UB-31 (Imperial German Navy) with the loss of a crew member.

== 19 December ==
List of shipwrecks: 19 December 1917
Ship	State	Description
HMT Annie	Royal Navy	The naval trawler was lost in the Mediterranean Sea.
Arno	Denmark	World War I: The cargo ship struck a mine and sank in the North Sea east south east of Aberdeen, United Kingdom (57°20′N 1°00′W). Her crew survived.
Borgsten	Norway	World War I: The cargo ship was torpedoed and sunk in the English Channel 30 nautical miles (56 km) off Barfleur, Manche, France by SM UC-64 (Imperial German Navy). Her crew survived.
Ingrid II	Norway	World War I: The cargo ship was torpedoed and sunk in the Atlantic Ocean 6 nautical miles (11 km) off Trevose Head, Cornwall, United Kingdom (50°36′N 5°11′W) by SM U-60 (Imperial German Navy) with the loss of ten crew.
Kumback (or Kimback)	United States	The 37-gross register ton, 50.3-foot (15.3 m) motor yacht sank off Anchorage, Territory of Alaska. The two people on board survived.
S. Giuseppe B.	Italy	World War I: The sailing vessel was sunk in the Mediterranean Sea by SM UB-50 (Imperial German Navy).
Trevelyan	United Kingdom	World War I: The cargo ship was torpedoed and damaged in the English Channel 20 nautical miles (37 km) north of Cap Barfleur, Manche by SM UC-64 (Imperial German Navy). She was beached and was consequently declared a constructive total loss. Later repaired and returned to service.
SM UB-56	Imperial German Navy	World War I: The Type UB III submarine struck a mine and sank in the Strait of Dover (50°58′N 1°21′E) with the loss of all 37 crew.
Vinovia	United Kingdom	World War I: The cargo ship was torpedoed and sunk in the Atlantic Ocean 8 nautical miles (15 km) south of the Wolf Rock, Cornwall (49°56′N 5°33′W) by SM U-105 (Imperial German Navy) with the loss of nine crew.

== 20 December ==
List of shipwrecks: 20 December 1917
Ship	State	Description
Alice Marie	United Kingdom	World War I: The cargo ship was torpedoed and sunk in the English Channel 6 nautical miles (11 km) east north east of Start Point, Devon by SM UB-31 (Imperial German Navy). Her crew survived.
Attualita	Italy	World War I: The cargo ship was sunk in the Gulf of Genoa off Arma di Taggia, Liguria (43°49′N 7°53′E) by SM UB-49 (Imperial German Navy). Her crew survived.
Eveline	United Kingdom	World War I: The cargo ship was torpedoed and sunk in the English Channel 9.5 nautical miles (17.6 km) south of Berry Head, Devon by SM UB-31 (Imperial German Navy). Her crew survived.
Fiscus	United Kingdom	World War I: The cargo ship was torpedoed and sunk in the Mediterranean Sea 10 nautical miles (19 km) north north east of Cape Ivi, Algeria by SM U-35 (Imperial German Navy) with the loss of a crew member.
Noris	Norway	World War I: The coaster was sunk in the English Channel 10 nautical miles (19 km) off Port-en-Bessin, Calvados, France by SM UB-54 (Imperial German Navy) with the loss of fourteen crew.
Polvarth	United Kingdom	World War I: The cargo ship was torpedoed and sunk in the Atlantic Ocean 35 nautical miles (65 km) west of Ouessant, Finistère, France (48°20′N 6°00′W) by SM U-86 (Imperial German Navy) with the loss of two of her crew.
Regin	Norway	World War I: The cargo ship was sunk in the Gulf of Genoa 1 nautical mile (1.9 km) south of Cape Mele, Liguria by SM UB-49 (Imperial German Navy) with the loss of a crew member.
Suruga	United States	World War I: The cargo ship was damaged in the Gulf of Genoa by SM UB-49 (Imperial German Navy). She was beached at San Remo, Liguria. Later refloated, repaired and returned to service.
Warsaw	United Kingdom	World War I: The coaster was torpedoed and sunk in the English Channel 4 nautical miles (7.4 km) south east by east of Start Point by SM UB-31 (Imperial German Navy) with the loss of seventeen crew.
Waverley	United Kingdom	World War I: The cargo ship was torpedoed and sunk in the Mediterranean Sea 33 nautical miles (61 km) north east of Cape Ivi (36°37′N 0°33′E) by SM U-35 (Imperial German Navy) with the loss of 22 crew.

== 21 December ==
List of shipwrecks: 21 December 1917
Ship	State	Description
Boa Vista	Portugal	World War I: The cargo ship was torpedoed and sunk in the Bay of Biscay 5 nautical miles (9.3 km) south west of the Île d'Yeu, Vendée, France (46°37′N 2°33′W) by SM U-89 (Imperial German Navy) with the loss of two of her crew. Survivors were rescued by Sauterelle (French Navy).
City of Lucknow	United Kingdom	World War I: The cargo ship was torpedoed and sunk in the Mediterranean Sea 50 nautical miles (93 km) north east by east of the Cani Rocks by SM UB-50 (Imperial German Navy). Her crew survived.
HMT Ocean Scout I	Royal Navy	The naval trawler collided with another vessel and sank in the Atlantic Ocean west of Ireland.
Orne	France	World War I: The coaster was sunk in the English Channel 25 nautical miles (46 km) west of Portland Bill, Dorset, United Kingdom by SM UB-54 (Imperial German Navy). Her crew survived.
Spro	Norway	World War I: The cargo ship was sunk in the Bay of Biscay 4 nautical miles (7.4 km) off the Glénan Islands, Finistère, France (47°36′N 4°04′W) by SM U-104 (Imperial German Navy) with the loss of twelve crew.
Stromboli	Italy	World War I: The cargo ship was sunk in the Gulf of Genoa off Cape Mele, Liguria (43°57′N 8°12′E) by SM UB-49 (Imperial German Navy).

== 22 December ==
List of shipwrecks: 22 December 1917
Ship	State	Description
Clan Cameron	United Kingdom	World War I: The cargo ship was torpedoed and sunk in the English Channel 23 nautical miles (43 km) south west of Portland Bill, Dorset by SM UB-58 (Imperial German Navy).
Colemere	United Kingdom	World War I: The cargo ship was torpedoed and sunk in St. George's Channel 35 nautical miles (65 km) west of the Smalls Lighthouse by SM U-105 (Imperial German Navy) with the loss of four crew.
Mabel Baird	United Kingdom	World War I: The cargo ship was torpedoed and sunk in the Atlantic Ocean 4 nautical miles (7.4 km) west south west of The Lizard, Cornwall (49°57′N 5°17′W) by SM UB-57 (Imperial German Navy) with the loss of five of her crew.
Mohawk	United States	The steam-powered canal boat sank at the dock of Wheeler and Howes Company, Bridgeport, Connecticut.
Piemonte	Italy	World War I: The cargo ship was damaged in the Gulf of Genoa south of Livorno, Tuscany by SM UB-49 (Imperial German Navy). She was beached but was later salvaged.
USS SC-117	United States Navy	The SC-1-class submarine chaser was destroyed by fire off Fortress Monroe, Virginia.

== 23 December ==
List of shipwrecks: 23 December 1917
Ship	State	Description
Caboto	Italy	World War I: The cargo ship was sunk in the Gulf of Genoa 20 nautical miles (37 km)north of Polpulonia, Tuscany by SM UB-49 (Imperial German Navy).
Grantley Hall	United Kingdom	World War I: The cargo ship struck a mine and sank in the North Sea 5 nautical miles (9.3 km) east of Orfordness, Suffolk. Her crew survived.
Hilda Lea	United Kingdom	World War I: The cargo ship was torpedoed and sunk in the English Channel 24 nautical miles (44 km) south by east of St. Catherine's Point, Isle of Wight by SM UB-35 (Imperial German Navy) with the loss of a crew member.
Pietro	Italy	World War I: The cargo ship was sunk in the Mediterranean Sea off Puerto Mazarrón, Murcia, Spain (37°28′N 1°10′W) by SM U-35 (Imperial German Navy).
Ragna	Norway	World War I: The cargo ship was sunk in the English Channel 16 nautical miles (30 km) north west of the Cap de La Heve Lighthouse, Seine-Inférieure, France by SM UB-54 (Imperial German Navy). Her crew survived.
HMS Surprise	Royal Navy	World War I: The Yarrow Later M-class destroyer struck a mine and sank in the North Sea off the coast of the Netherlands.
HMS Tornado	Royal Navy	World War I: The R-class destroyer struck a mine and sank in the North Sea off the coast of the Netherlands.
HMS Torrent	Royal Navy	World War I: The R-class destroyer struck a mine and sank in the North Sea off the coast of the Netherlands.
Vellore	Norway	World War I: The sailing vessel was sunk in the Atlantic Ocean 35 nautical miles (65 km) west of the Bishop Rock, Isles of Scilly, United Kingdom by SM UB-57 (Imperial German Navy). Her crew survived.

== 24 December ==
List of shipwrecks: 24 December 1917
Ship	State	Description
Canova	United Kingdom	World War I: The cargo ship was torpedoed and sunk 15 nautical miles (28 km) south of Mine Head, Ireland by SM U-105 (Imperial German Navy).
Daybreak	United Kingdom	World War I: The cargo ship was torpedoed and sunk in the Irish Sea 1 nautical mile (1.9 km) east of the South Rock Lightship (United Kingdom) by SM U-87 (Imperial German Navy) with the loss of 21 of her crew.
Luciston	United Kingdom	World War I: The cargo ship was torpedoed and damaged in the English Channel 1.5 nautical miles (2.8 km) west by south of the Owers Lightship (United Kingdom) by SM UC-71 (Imperial German Navy) with the loss of a crew member. She was beached was declared a total loss. The wreck was dispersed in December 1923.
HMS Penshurst	Royal Navy	World War I: The Q-ship was torpedoed and sunk in the Bristol Channel (51°38′N 5°48′W) by SM U-110 (Imperial German Navy) with the loss of two crew.
Turnbridge	United Kingdom	World War I: The collier was torpedoed and sunk in the Mediterranean Sea 34 nautical miles (63 km) north east by north of Cape Ivi, Algeria (36°37′N 0°24′E) by SM U-35 (Imperial German Navy) with the loss of a crew member.

== 25 December ==
List of shipwrecks: 25 December 1917
Ship	State	Description
Agberi	United Kingdom	World War I: The Elder Dempster 3,463 grt ocean liner was torpedoed and sunk in St. George's Channel 18 nautical miles (33 km) north west of Bardsey Island, Pembrokeshire by SM U-87 (Imperial German Navy) en route from Dakar to Liverpool. There were no casualties.
Ajax	Denmark	World War I: The cargo ship was torpedoed and sunk in the Bay of Biscay off Audierne, Finistère (47°53′N 4°32′W) by SM U-104 (Imperial German Navy) with the loss of eleven crew.
Argo	United Kingdom	World War I: The collier was torpedoed and sunk in the Mediterranean Sea 18 nautical miles (33 km) north west of Cape Ténès, Algeria (36°42′N 1°01′E) by SM U-35 (Imperial German Navy). Her crew survived.
Cliftondale	United Kingdom	World War I: The collier was torpedoed and sunk in the Mediterranean Sea 36 nautical miles (67 km) east by north of Cape Ténès by SM U-35 (Imperial German Navy) with the loss of three crew.
Espagne	Belgium	World War I: The cargo ship was sunk in the English Channel off St. Catherine's Point, Isle of Wight, United Kingdom (50°26′N 1°29′W) by SM UC-71 (Imperial German Navy).
Hekla	Denmark	World War I: The coaster struck a mine and sank in the Mediterranean Sea 3 nautical miles (5.6 km) south west of Cape Palinuro, Italy (39°50′N 15°42′E) with the loss of thirteen of her crew.
Hercules	Germany	The steam fishing vessel, en route to Geestemünde, Germany, disappeared without trace, with the loss of all ten crew.
Nordpol	Norway	World War I: The cargo ship was sunk in the Mediterranean Sea 30 nautical miles (56 km) off Cape Cherchell, Algeria (37°02′N 2°02′E) by SM U-35 (Imperial German Navy). Her crew survived.
Sant' Antonio	Italy	World War I: The barque was shelled and sunk in the Mediterranean Sea off the coast of Algeria by SM UB-50 (Imperial German Navy).
SM U-87	Imperial German Navy	World War I: The Type U 87 submarine was rammed in the Irish Sea by HMS Buttercup and was then depth charged and sunk by the patrol craft PC-56 (both Royal Navy) with the loss of all 44 crew.
Umballa	United Kingdom	World War I: The cargo ship was torpedoed and sunk in the Gulf of Policastro 8 nautical miles (15 km) south of Cape Scala, Italy (39°46′N 15°39′E) by SM UB-49 (Imperial German Navy). Her crew survived.

== 26 December ==
List of shipwrecks: 26 December 1917
Ship	State	Description
Benito	United Kingdom	World War I: Convoy OF 18: The cargo ship was torpedoed and sunk in the English Channel 9 nautical miles (17 km) south of Dodman Point, Cornwall (50°04′N 4°45′W) by SM UB-57 (Imperial German Navy). Her crew survived.
Lidia	Portugal	World War I: The sailing vessel was sunk in the Atlantic Ocean south of Faial Island, Azores (37°50′N 28°40′W) by SM U-157 (Imperial German Navy). Her crew survived.
Skaala	Norway	World War I: The cargo ship was torpedoed and sunk in the English Channel 4 nautical miles (7.4 km) west of Prawle Point, Devon, United Kingdom (50°11′N 3°50′W) by SM UB-35 (Imperial German Navy) with the loss of a crew member.
Tregenna	United Kingdom	World War I: Convoy OF 18: The cargo ship was torpedoed and sunk in the English Channel 9 nautical miles (17 km) south of Dodman Point (50°04′N 4°45′W) by SM UB-57 (Imperial German Navy). Her crew survived.

== 27 December ==
List of shipwrecks: 27 December 1917
Ship	State	Description
Adela	United Kingdom	World War I: The coaster was torpedoed and sunk in the Irish Sea 12 nautical miles (22 km) north west of The Skerries, Isle of Anglesey by SM U-100 (Imperial German Navy) with the loss of 24 of her crew.
P.L.M. 4	France	World War I: The cargo ship was sunk in the English Channel 28 nautical miles (52 km) north east of Barfleu, Seine-Inférieure by SM UC-71 (Imperial German Navy).

== 28 December ==
List of shipwrecks: 28 December 1917
Ship	State	Description
Alfred H. Read	United Kingdom	World War I: The pilot vessel struck a mine and sank in the River Mersey with the loss of 39 lives.
Chirripo	United Kingdom	World War I: The cargo ship struck a mine and sank in Belfast Lough. Her crew survived.
Clara	United Kingdom	World War I: The collier was torpedoed and sunk in the English Channel (50°11′N 5°36′W) by SM UB-57 (Imperial German Navy). Her crew survived.
Dauno	Italy	World War I: The coaster was sunk in the Mediterranean Sea east of Benghazi, Libya by SM UC-73 (Imperial German Navy).
Fallodon	United Kingdom	World War I: The cargo ship was torpedoed and sunk in the English Channel 12 nautical miles (22 km) south south east of St. Catherine's Point, Isle of Wight (50°26′N 1°06′W) by SM UC-71 (Imperial German Navy) with the loss of a crew member.
Lord Derby	United Kingdom	World War I: The collier was torpedoed and sunk in St. George's Channel 7 nautical miles (13 km) south west by south of St. Anns Head by SM U-105 (Imperial German Navy) with the loss of three crew.
SMS M11	Imperial German Navy	World War I: The M1-class minesweeper was sunk by mines in the North Sea.
Magellan	France	World War I: The cargo ship was sunk in the Atlantic Ocean 166 nautical miles (307 km) north west of Cape Finisterre, Spain (43°10′N 13°32′W) by SM U-43 (Imperial German Navy).
Maxton	United Kingdom	World War I: The cargo ship was torpedoed and sunk in the Atlantic Ocean 28 nautical miles (52 km) north of Malin Head, County Donegal by SM U-19 (Imperial German Navy) with the loss of a crew member.
HMT Piscatorial II	Royal Navy	World War I: The naval trawler struck a mine and sank in the English Channel 7 nautical miles (13 km) south west of Brighton, Sussex with the loss of all ten of her crew.
Robert Eggleton	United Kingdom	World War I: The cargo ship was torpedoed and sunk in St. George's Channel 10 nautical miles (19 km) south west of Bardsey Island, Pembrokeshire by SM U-91 (Imperial German Navy). Her crew survived.
Santa Amalia	United Kingdom	World War I: The cargo ship was torpedoed and sunk in the Atlantic Ocean 30 nautical miles (56 km) north north east of Malin Head by SM U-19 (Imperial German Navy) with the loss of 43 crew.

== 29 December ==
List of shipwrecks: 29 December 1917
Ship	State	Description
Ennismore	United Kingdom	World War I: The cargo ship was torpedoed and sunk in the North Sea 15 nautical miles (28 km) south east of Buchan Ness, Aberdeenshire (57°17′N 1°25′W) by SM UC-58 (Imperial German Navy) with the loss of ten of her crew.
Patria	Russia	World War I: The cargo ship was sunk in the North Sea 8 nautical miles (15 km) off Hartlepool, County Durham, United Kingdom by SM UB-21 (Imperial German Navy).
Peregrine	United Kingdom	The passenger ship ran aground in the North Sea 14 nautical miles (26 km) off Walton-on-the-Naze, Essex. All 88 people on board were rescued by the Walton Lifeboat.
HMT Sapper	Royal Navy	World War I: The naval trawler struck a mine and sank in the English Channel off the Owers Lightship (United Kingdom) (50°37′N 0°41′W) with the loss of all nineteen crew.
Tiro	Norway	World War I: The cargo ship was sunk in the Atlantic Ocean 7 nautical miles (13 km) north west by west of The Lizard, Cornwall, United Kingdom (49°56′N 5°23′W) by SM UB-57 (Imperial German Navy). Her crew survived.

== 30 December ==
List of shipwrecks: 30 December 1917
Ship	State	Description
Aragon	United Kingdom	World War I: The troopship was torpedoed and sunk in the Mediterranean Sea off Alexandria, Egypt (31°18′N 29°48′E) by SM UC-34 (Imperial German Navy) with the loss of 610 lives.
HMS Attack	Royal Navy	World War I: The Acheron-class destroyer was torpedoed and sunk in the Mediterranean Sea off Alexandria (31°18′N 29°49′E) by SM UC-34 (Imperial German Navy) whilst rescuing survivors from Aragon (United Kingdom). Ten of her 70 crew were killed.
Hercules	United Kingdom	World War I: The collier was torpedoed and sunk in the North Sea 3 nautical miles (5.6 km) east north east of Whitby, Yorkshire (54°32′N 0°39′W) by SM UB-21 (Imperial German Navy) with the loss of twelve of her crew.
Joachim Mumbru	Spain	World War I: The cargo ship was sunk in the Atlantic Ocean south of Madeira, Portugal (31°17′N 17°20′W) by SM U-156 (Imperial German Navy).
Zone	United Kingdom	World War I: The cargo ship was torpedoed and sunk in the Atlantic Ocean 4 nautical miles (7.4 km) off St. Ives, Cornwall (50°16′N 5°29′W) by SM U-110 (Imperial German Navy). Her crew survived.

== 31 December ==
List of shipwrecks: 31 December 1917
Ship	State	Description
USS Fli-Hawk	United States Navy	The patrol boat collided with Gratitude (United States) at Norfolk, Virginia and sank. She was subsequently raised, repaired and returned to service.
Lily	Greece	World War I: The cargo ship was sunk in the Mediterranean Sea 50 nautical miles (93 km) west of Port Said, Egypt (32°12′N 32°08′E) by SM UB-53 (Imperial German Navy).
HMS Osmanieh	Royal Navy	World War I: The fleet messenger struck a mine from SM UC-34 and sank at Alexandria, Egypt with the loss of 198 lives.
Vigrid	Norway	World War I: The cargo ship was torpedoed and sunk in the English Channel 10 nautical miles (19 km) north west of The Lizard, Cornwall, United Kingdom (50°03′N 5°55′W) by SM U-95 (Imperial German Navy) with the loss of five of her crew.
Westville	United Kingdom	World War I: The cargo ship was torpedoed and sunk in the English Channel 5 nautical miles (9.3 km) west south west of St. Catherine's Point, Isle of Wight (50°32′N 1°25′W) by SM UB-35 (Imperial German Navy). Her crew survived.

== Unknown date ==
List of shipwrecks: unknown December 1917
Ship	State	Description
John H. Kirby	United States	World War I: The barque was captured and scuttled in the Indian Ocean 320 miles (510 km) south east of Port Elizabeth, South Africa by SMS Wolf (Imperial German Navy). Reported dates are 18 or 30 November or 1 December 1917.
Unknown barge	United States	The wrecking barge was wrecked while attempting salvage of the wrecked steamer Mariposa (United States) in the Territory of Alaska probably during the first week of December.
