= SS Colemere =

History
- Name: Colemere
- Namesake: Cole Mere
- Owner: Watson Steamship Co. (1915–1916); Bromport Steamship Co. (1916–1917)
- Port of registry: (United Kingdom) Liverpool
- Builder: Dunlop, Bremner and Co., Port Glasgow, Scotland
- Launched: 17 December 1914
- Completed: 9 March 1915
- Identification: Official number: 135362
- Fate: Sunk by submarine, 22 December 1917

General characteristics
- Type: Freighter
- Tonnage: 2,120 gross register tons (GRT); 1,160 net register tons (NRT)
- Length: 303.6 ft (92.5 m)
- Beam: 44.7 ft (13.6 m)
- Draught: 18.3 ft (5.6 m)
- Installed power: 173 nhp; 1,350 ihp (1,010 kW)
- Propulsion: 1 screw propeller; 1 triple-expansion steam engine
- Speed: 10.5 knots (19.4 km/h; 12.1 mph)

SS Colemere was a small freighter built during the First World War. Completed in 1915, she was intended for the West African trade. The ship was sunk by the German submarine SM U-105 in December 1917 with the loss of four crewmen.

== Description ==
Colemere had an overall length of 303.6 feet (92.5 m), with a beam of 44.7 feet (13.6 m) and a draught of 18.3 feet (5.6 m). The ship was assessed at 2,120 gross register tons (GRT) and 1,160 net register tons (NRT). She had a vertical triple-expansion steam engine driving a single screw propeller. The engine was rated at a total of 173 nominal horsepower and produced 1,350 indicated horsepower (1,010 kW). This gave her a maximum speed of 10.5 knots (19.4 km/h; 12.1 mph).

== Construction and career ==
Colemere, named after Cole Mere, was laid down as yard number 279 by Dunlop, Bremner and Co. at its shipyard in Port Glasgow, Scotland for the Watson Steamship Co. The ship was launched on 17 December 1914 and completed on 9 March 1915. She was sold to the Lever Brothers' newly formed Bromport Steamship Co. on 11 May 1916. Colemere was bound for Freetown, Sierra Leone, with a general cargo when she was torpedoed by U-105 35 miles (56 km) west of Smalls Lighthouse with the loss of four crewmen on 22 December 1917.

== Bibliography ==
- Admiralty (1988) [1919]. "Merchant Shipping (Losses): British Merchant Vessels Captured or Destroyed by the Enemy". British Vessels Lost at Sea, 1914-18 and 1939-45 (3rd ed.). Wellingborough, UK: Patrick Stephens. pp. 1–99. ISBN 1-85260-134-5.
- Fenton, Roy (December 2022). "Levers' Early Shipping Ventures: Bromport Steamship Co., Ltd. and its Predecessors". Marine News Supplement. 76 (12): S340–S352. ISSN 0966-6958.
