= SS Athos =

Coordinates: 35.3667°N 18.5333°E

History

France
- Name: SS Athos
- Namesake: Athos
- Owner: Messageries Maritimes
- Builder: Ateliers et Chantiers de France, Dunkirk
- Launched: 25 July 1914
- In service: 28 November 1915
- Fate: Torpedoed and sunk, 17 February 1917

General characteristics
- Type: Cargo-passenger ship
- Tonnage: 12,698 GRT; 9,400 DWT
- Displacement: 18,570 metric tons
- Length: 161.7 m (530 ft 6 in)
- Beam: 18.83 m (61 ft 9 in)
- Propulsion: 2 × triple-expansion steam engines, 9,000 hp (6,711 kW); 9 × coal-fired boilers; 2 shafts
- Speed: 17.5 knots (32.4 km/h; 20.1 mph)
- Capacity: Passengers: 112 first-class; 96 second-class; 90 third-class; 390–1000 in steerage

SS Athos was a French cargo-passenger ship of the Messageries Maritimes, launched in 1914, that was sunk in the Mediterranean by the German submarine SM U-65 during World War I.

== Ship history ==
Construction of the ship started on 25 July 1914 in Dunkirk, but was halted when the city was bombed during the First Battle of Ypres. The ship was towed to Saint Nazaire, where it was completed as a troopship and not, as intended, as a passenger ship. Measuring 12,644 gross register tons, the ship was 156.48 metres (513 ft 5 in) long, with a beam of 18.84 metres (61 ft 10 in). Her speed was 17.5 knots (32.4 km/h; 20.1 mph).

Her first voyage was to China, leaving on 28 November 1915. Her second was between 29 October and 26 December 1916 from Marseille to Yokohama and back.

At 12:27 on 17 February 1917, during her third voyage, Athos was torpedoed by the German submarine SM U-65 commanded by Hermann von Fischel, while 180 nautical miles (330 km; 210 mi) east by south of Malta. Aboard Athos were 1,950 people, including the crew, Chinese Labour Corps, a large continent of Senegalese Tirailleurs soldiers, and civilian passengers, including women and children. The ship sank in 14 minutes taking with her 754 people, including the captain and 11 crew members. The survivors were picked up by the escort ships Enseigne Henry and Mameluck, as well as the gunboat Moqueuse and the torpedo-boat Baliste.
