= SS Sarnia (1910) =

British World War I passenger vessel

History
- Name: 1910–1914: SS Sarnia; 1914–1918: HMS Sarnia
- Operator: London and South Western Railway
- Port of registry: (United Kingdom of Great Britain and Ireland)
- Builder: Cammell Laird, Birkenhead
- Yard number: 765
- Launched: 9 July 1910
- Fate: Sunk 12 September 1918

General characteristics
- Tonnage: 1,498 GRT
- Length: 284.6 ft (86.7 m)
- Beam: 39.1 ft (11.9 m)
- Draught: 15.8 ft (4.8 m)
- Installed power: Two double-ended marine boilers
- Propulsion: Set of Parsons turbines driving 3 shafts
- Speed: 20 knots (37 km/h; 23 mph)
- Crew: 48

SS Sarnia was a passenger vessel built for the London and South Western Railway in 1910. During the First World War, she served in the Royal Navy as the armed boarding steamer HMS Sarnia.

== History ==
Sarnia was built by Cammell Laird in Birkenhead, England, and launched on 9 July 1910. Propulsion was by two double-ended marine boilers providing steam for a set of Parsons turbines driving three shafts. Passenger accommodations were for 186 first and 114 second class passengers supported by 48 crew. Sarnia was one of a pair of ships ordered by the London and South Western Railway, the other being Caesarea. They were the first turbine steamers ordered by the railway company. They were deployed on the route to the Channel Islands for a few years until the outbreak of the First World War.

The Admiralty requisitioned her during the First World War for use by the Royal Navy and reconfigured her as the armed boarding steamer HMS Sarnia. On 28 October 1915 she collided with the auxiliary minesweeper HMS Hythe in the Dardanelles; Hythe sank with the loss of 154 lives.

The Imperial German Navy submarine SM U-65 sank Sarnia in the Mediterranean Sea off Alexandria, Egypt, (31°58′N 30°55′E) on 12 September 1918 with the loss of 53 crew.
