= SM U-65 (Germany) =

Submarine serving in the Imperial German Navy in World War I

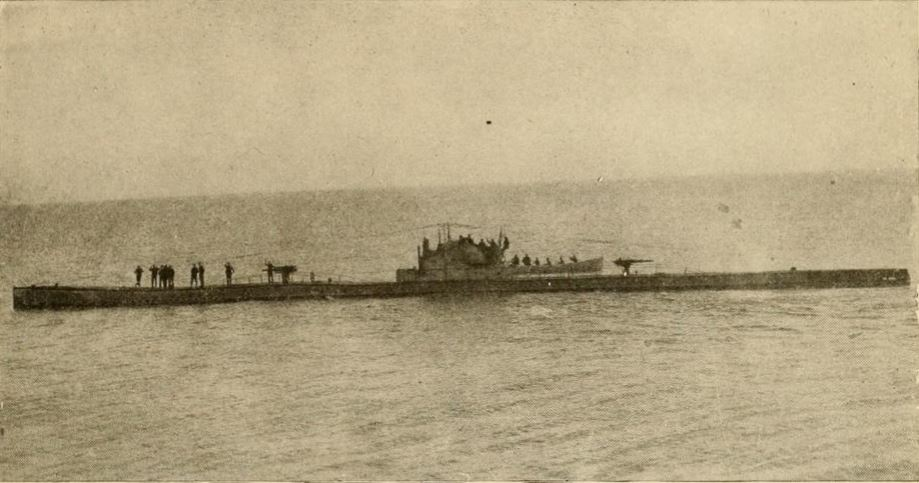
- U-65

History

German Empire
- Name: U-65
- Ordered: 17 May 1915
- Builder: Germaniawerft, Kiel
- Yard number: 249
- Laid down: 4 June 1915
- Launched: 21 March 1916
- Commissioned: 11 May 1916
- Fate: 28 October 1918 - Scuttled at Pola in position 44°52′N 13°50′E during the evacuation from there.

General characteristics
- Class & type: Type U 63 submarine
- Displacement: 810 t (800 long tons) surfaced; 927 t (912 long tons) submerged
- Length: 68.36 m (224 ft 3 in) (o/a); 55.55 m (182 ft 3 in) (pressure hull)
- Beam: 6.30 m (20 ft 8 in) (oa); 4.15 m (13 ft 7 in) (pressure hull)
- Height: 7.65 m (25 ft 1 in)
- Draught: 4.04 m (13 ft 3 in)
- Installed power: 2 × 2,200 PS (1,618 kW; 2,170 shp) surfaced; 2 × 1,200 PS (883 kW; 1,184 shp) submerged
- Propulsion: 2 shafts
- Speed: 16.5 knots (30.6 km/h; 19.0 mph) surfaced; 9.0 knots (16.7 km/h; 10.4 mph) submerged
- Range: 9,170 nmi (16,980 km; 10,550 mi) at 8 knots (15 km/h; 9.2 mph) surfaced; 60 nmi (110 km; 69 mi) at 5 knots (9.3 km/h; 5.8 mph) submerged
- Test depth: 50 m (164 ft 1 in)
- Complement: 36
- Armament: 4 × 50 cm (19.7 in) torpedo tubes (two bow, two stern); 8 torpedoes; 1 × 8.8 cm (3.5 in) SK L/30 deck gun

Service record
- Part of: IV Flotilla; 2 July - 18 November 1916; Pola / Mittelmeer / Mittelmeer I Flotilla; 18 November 1916 - 28 October 1918
- Commanders: Kptlt. Hermann von Fischel; 11 May 1916 – 18 July 1918; Kptlt. Gustav Sieß; 19 July – 29 September 1918; Kptlt. Clemens Wickel; 30 September – 28 October 1918
- Operations: 11 patrols
- Victories: 47 merchant ships sunk (75,280 GRT); 1 auxiliary warship sunk (1,498 GRT); 3 merchant ships damaged (8,402 tons)

SM U-65 (Note: "SM" stands for "Seiner Majestät" (English: His Majesty's) and combined with the U for Unterseeboot would be translated as His Majesty's Submarine.) was one of the 329 submarines serving in the Imperial German Navy in World War I. U-65 was engaged in the naval warfare and took part in the First Battle of the Atlantic.

== Operations ==
U-65. Kaptlt. Hermann von Fischel. On completion at Kiel did trials at Kiel School about May and June 1916, afterwards proceeding to the North Sea to join 4th Flotilla.

- ? 11–14 July 1916. North Sea patrol.
- 16–24 July 1916. North Sea patrol.
- 17–21 August 1916. North Sea patrol, attacked minesweeper Haldon 20 August.
- 3–4 September 1916. North Sea patrol. Returned with defects.
- 26 October – 19 November 1916. To Mediterranean, northabout. Engaged by armed yacht Valiant II in 35°55′N 3°57′W. Sank nothing. On arrival at Cattaro joined the Pola-Cattaro Flotilla.
- 28 November – 7 December 1916. Left Cattaro and on 1 December probably sank a steamer. On 4 December sank British SS Caledonia in 35°40′N 17°04′E. The submarine was badly rammed by Caledonia and appears to have returned home immediately on the surface.
- 17 February 1917. Sank troopship SS Athos (12,644 tons). 754 casualties.
- 29 March – 19/20 April 1917. In western Mediterranean sank 4 steamships, 5 sailing vessels (13,000 tons).
- 14 May – 9 June 1917. Possible cruise of U-65. After leaving Cattaro submarine damaged cruiser HMS Dartmouth by torpedo on 15 May in 41°11′N 18°15′E. She then sank 7 steamers and 12 sailing vessels in the central Mediterranean. 6 June, she was reported off Cape Passaro, 7 June in the vicinity of Straits of Messina, and 8 June was possibly attacked by seaplane in 39°4′N 19°00′E.
- The next cruise of U-65 which can be reconstructed with probability was from 10 to 31 January or 1 February 1918. On this cruise she sank 2 steamers and 1 sailing vessel, and was twice attacked from the air and once by depth-charged by Campanula, which she missed by torpedo.
- A later possible cruise was for about the first 3 weeks of September 1918, on which she sank 4 steamers and damaged 4 more, between longitudes 8° and 17°E.
- At the end of October 1918 she was scuttled by the Germans at Pola or Cattaro.

== Summary of raiding history ==
Date	Name	Nationality	Tonnage (Note: Tonnages are in gross register tons)	Fate
4 December 1916	Caledonia	United Kingdom	9,223	Sunk
17 February 1917	Athos	France	12,644	Sunk
24 February 1917	Venere	Kingdom of Italy	290	Sunk
28 February 1917	Emancipato	Kingdom of Italy	30	Sunk
1 March 1917	Nicolaos	Greece	1,215	Sunk
1 March 1917	Teresina	Kingdom of Italy	212	Sunk
2 March 1917	S. Vincenzo F.	Kingdom of Italy	52	Sunk
6 March 1917	Porto Di Smirne	Kingdom of Italy	2,576	Sunk
1 April 1917	Maria T.	Kingdom of Italy	45	Sunk
1 April 1917	Maria Santissima D. Grazie	Kingdom of Italy	35	Sunk
2 April 1917	Britannia	United Kingdom	3,129	Sunk
3 April 1917	Maria Ferrara	Kingdom of Italy	106	Sunk
5 April 1917	Calliope	United Kingdom	3,829	Sunk
7 April 1917	Trefusis	United Kingdom	2,642	Sunk
8 April 1917	Lucia	Kingdom of Italy	138	Sunk
8 April 1917	Papa Gian Battista	Kingdom of Italy	138	Sunk
11 April 1917	Tremorvah	United Kingdom	3,654	Sunk
12 April 1917	Angela M.	Kingdom of Italy	187	Sunk
21 May 1917	Ampleforth	United Kingdom	3,873	Sunk
21 May 1917	Don Diego	United Kingdom	3,632	Sunk
23 May 1917	England	United Kingdom	3,798	Sunk
23 May 1917	Febronia Maria Antonina	Kingdom of Italy	55	Sunk
24 May 1917	Sant Antonio Di Padova	Kingdom of Italy	184	Sunk
25 May 1917	Diego Russo	Kingdom of Italy	113	Sunk
25 May 1917	Natale Monaco	Kingdom of Italy	57	Sunk
25 May 1917	Rosina R.	Kingdom of Italy	54	Sunk
25 May 1917	Vincenzino C.	Kingdom of Italy	55	Sunk
26 May 1917	Angelo Padre	Kingdom of Italy	50	Sunk
26 May 1917	Umaria	United Kingdom	5,317	Sunk
27 May 1917	Luigi	Kingdom of Italy	137	Sunk
27 May 1917	Maria Giuseppe	Kingdom of Italy	26	Sunk
4 June 1917	Manchester Trader	United Kingdom	3,938	Sunk
7 June 1917	Rosa M.	Kingdom of Italy	65	Sunk
5 July 1917	Ciboure	France	2,388	Sunk
6 July 1917	Roma	Kingdom of Italy	53	Sunk
8 July 1917	L'Immortale Leone	Kingdom of Italy	133	Sunk
24 November 1917	Enna	Kingdom of Italy	1,814	Sunk
1 December 1917	Citta Di Sassari	Kingdom of Italy	2,167	Sunk
2 December 1917	Carlino	Kingdom of Italy	95	Sunk
2 December 1917	La Margherita	Kingdom of Italy	41	Sunk
2 December 1917	San Antonio Il Vittorioso	Kingdom of Italy	45	Sunk
3 December 1917	Angelo	Kingdom of Italy	542	Damaged
25 January 1918	Giuseppe O.	Kingdom of Italy	74	Sunk
27 June 1918	Sotolongo	Spain	3,009	Sunk
1 July 1918	Monte Cristo	France	622	Sunk
4 July 1918	Merida	United Kingdom	5,951	Damaged
2 September 1918	San Andres	United Kingdom	3,314	Sunk
12 September 1918	Chao Chow Fu	United Kingdom	1,909	Damaged
12 September 1918	HMS Sarnia	Royal Navy	1,498	Sunk
14 September 1918	Ioanna No. 45	United Kingdom	9	Sunk
15 September 1918	Ioanna No. 37	United Kingdom	17	Sunk

== See also ==
- Room 40
- Anti-submarine warfare
- U-boat Campaign (World War I)

== Bibliography ==
- Gröner, Erich; Jung, Dieter; Maass, Martin (1991). U-boats and Mine Warfare Vessels. German Warships 1815–1945. Vol. 2. Translated by Thomas, Keith; Magowan, Rachel. London: Conway Maritime Press. ISBN 0-85177-593-4.
- Spindler, Arno (1966) [1932]. Der Handelskrieg mit U-Booten. 5 Vols. Berlin: Mittler & Sohn. Vols. 4+5, dealing with 1917+18, are very hard to find: Guildhall Library, London, has them all, also Vol. 1-3 in an English translation: The submarine war against commerce.
- Beesly, Patrick (1982). Room 40: British Naval Intelligence 1914-1918. London: H Hamilton. ISBN 978-0-241-10864-2.
- Halpern, Paul G. (1995). A Naval History of World War I. New York: Routledge. ISBN 978-1-85728-498-0.
- Roessler, Eberhard (1997). Die Unterseeboote der Kaiserlichen Marine. Bonn: Bernard & Graefe. ISBN 978-3-7637-5963-7.
- Schroeder, Joachim (2002). Die U-Boote des Kaisers. Bonn: Bernard & Graefe. ISBN 978-3-7637-6235-4.
- Koerver, Hans Joachim (2008). Room 40: German Naval Warfare 1914-1918. Vol I., The Fleet in Action. Steinbach: LIS Reinisch. ISBN 978-3-902433-76-3.
- Koerver, Hans Joachim (2009). Room 40: German Naval Warfare 1914-1918. Vol II., The Fleet in Being. Steinbach: LIS Reinisch. ISBN 978-3-902433-77-0.
