= RMS Medina =

Steamship liner

Coordinates: 50.2500°N 3.5000°W

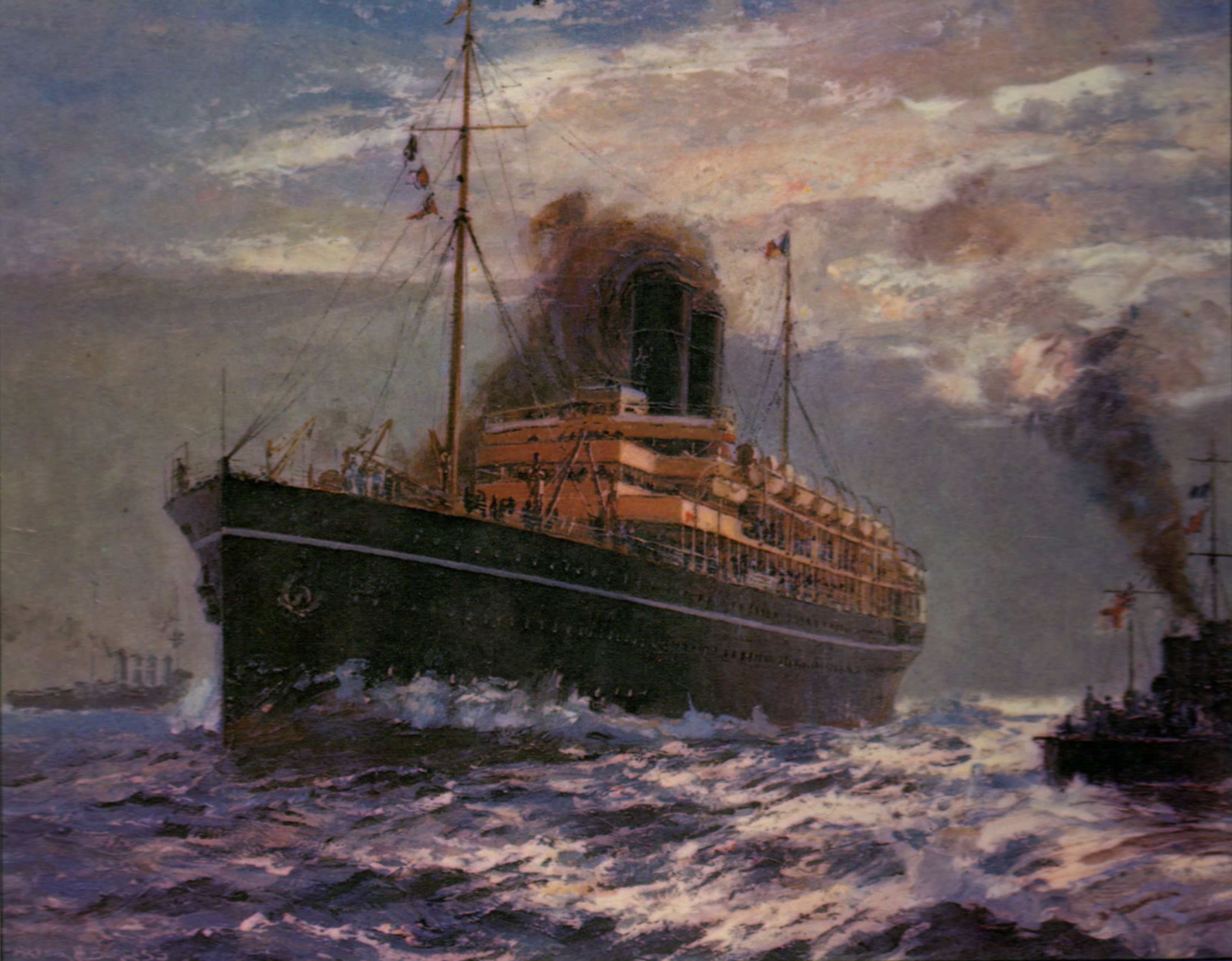
- Painting by Kenneth King

History

United Kingdom
- Name: RMS Medina
- Owner: P&O Steam Navigation Co
- Port of registry: London
- Route: London – Australia mail route
- Builder: Caird & Company, Greenock
- Cost: £332,377
- Yard number: 317
- Launched: 14 March 1911
- Completed: 10 October 1911 (commissioned)
- Maiden voyage: 11 November 1911
- Identification: Official number 131849
- Fate: Torpedoed off Start Point, Devon on 28 April 1917

General characteristics
- Class & type: P&O M-class ocean liner
- Tonnage: 12,358 tons
- Length: 550 ft (170 m)
- Beam: 62 ft (19 m)
- Depth: 34 ft 4 in (10.46 m)
- Installed power: Coal-fired quadruple-expansion steam engines rated at 1,400 ihp (1,000 kW)
- Propulsion: twin screw
- Speed: 19 knots (35 km/h; 22 mph)
- Capacity: 450 first class passengers; 220 second class passengers

RMS Medina was an ocean liner built by Caird and Company, Greenock, Scotland, in 1911, for the Peninsular and Oriental Steam Navigation Company. She was a Royal Mail Ship intended for use on the London to Australia route and was the last of the ten ships in P&O's M class. Between November 1911 and February 1912 Medina took King George V and Queen Mary to India for the Delhi Durbar. Medina was lost when she was torpedoed on 28 April 1917.

== Design and construction ==
Medina was the last of ten ships ordered by the Peninsular and Oriental Steam Navigation Company of the ‘M’ class. The order was placed with Caird and Company of Greenock, Scotland. She was 550 feet (170 m) long and 62 feet (19 m) wide with a depth of 34 feet (10 m). She was to carry 670 passengers, 450 in first class and 220 in second. She was powered by quadruple-expansion steam engines which produced 1,400 indicated horsepower (1,000 kW) to her twin screws which moved through the water at a top speed of 19 knots (35 km/h; 22 mph).

During building it was decided that Medina would take King George V and Queen Mary to India for the Delhi Durbar. Medina was, therefore, initially commissioned into the Royal Navy as the royal yacht and her crew were mainly naval personnel. Medina was provided with an extra mast, necessary to maintain Royal flag etiquette and furnished with a white hull with bands of royal blue and gold and buff funnels. Various large rooms intended for public use were redecorated as royal apartments.

== Maiden voyage ==
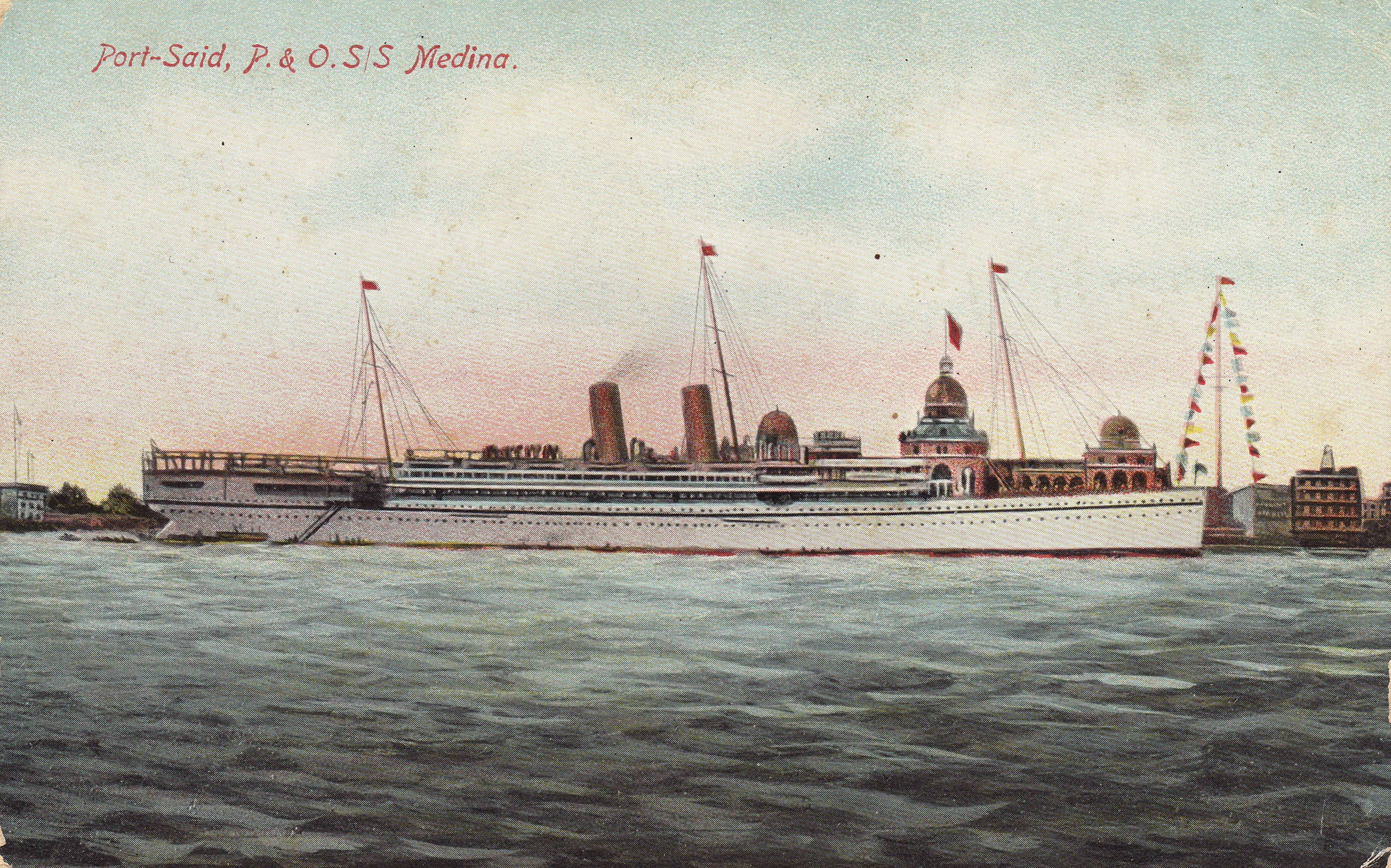
SS Medina as a P&O ship in 1915 at Port Said, Egypt

Medina left Portsmouth for India on the afternoon of 11 November 1911 (being saluted from the guns of HMS Victory, then still afloat in Portsmouth harbour), returning on 4 February 1912, after which she returned to Caird and Co. for refitting. She was then delivered to P&O in June 1912. She had only two years of peacetime service before the First World War broke out, but remained with P&O during the war.

== Torpedoed ==
The German submarine SM UB-31 torpedoed her 3 miles east northeast of Start Point, Devon on 28 April 1917. Ninety four survivors rescued by smack "Onward" (United Kingdom) that also collected 3 lifeboats.

== Wreck today ==
Medina's wreck lies upright with a 15 degree list to port. She is reasonably intact despite salvage of copper and passengers' baggage from forward holds. Her stern is most damaged and she is sinking into the mud of the seabed. Her bulkheads are collapsing and her compartments are folding down.
