= SM UB-65 =

German World War I U-boat

History

German Empire
- Name: UB-65
- Ordered: 20 May 1916
- Builder: Vulkan Werke, Hamburg
- Cost: 3,279,000 German Papiermark
- Yard number: 90
- Launched: 26 June 1917
- Commissioned: 18 August 1917
- Fate: Lost to unknown cause off Padstow, Cornwall after 14 July 1918.

General characteristics
- Class & type: Type UB III submarine
- Displacement: 508 t (500 long tons) surfaced; 639 t (629 long tons) submerged
- Length: 55.52 m (182 ft 2 in) (o/a)
- Beam: 5.76 m (18 ft 11 in)
- Draught: 3.70 m (12 ft 2 in)
- Propulsion: 2 × propeller shaft; 2 × MAN four-stroke 6-cylinder diesel engines, 1,050 bhp (780 kW); 2 × Siemens-Schuckert electric motors, 780 shp (580 kW)
- Speed: 13.3 knots (24.6 km/h; 15.3 mph) surfaced; 8 knots (15 km/h; 9.2 mph) submerged
- Range: 8,420 nmi (15,590 km; 9,690 mi) at 6 knots (11 km/h; 6.9 mph) surfaced; 55 nmi (102 km; 63 mi) at 4 knots (7.4 km/h; 4.6 mph) submerged
- Test depth: 50 m (160 ft)
- Complement: 3 officers, 31 men
- Armament: 5 × torpedo tubes (4 bow, 1 stern); 10 × torpedoes; 1 × 8.8 cm (3.46 in) deck gun

Service record
- Part of: V Flotilla; 30 September 1917 – 18 April 1918; II Flotilla; 18 April – 14 July 1918
- Commanders: Kptlt. Martin Schelle; 18 August 1917 – 14 July 1918
- Operations: 6 patrols
- Victories: 6 merchant ships sunk (6,197 GRT); 1 warship sunk (1,290 tons); 6 merchant ships damaged (11,443 GRT)

SM UB-65 was a Type UB III U-boat of the Imperial German Navy during World War I. Ordered on 20 May 1916, the U-boat was built at the Vulkan Werke shipyard in Hamburg, launched on 26 June 1917, and commissioned on 18 August 1917, under the command of Kapitänleutnant Martin Schelle.

== Service history ==
During her active career she sailed on six war patrols, sinking six merchant ships and damaging six more. She also sank the British Anchusa-class sloop HMS Arbutus.

The U-boat was lost off Padstow, Cornwall on or after 14 July 1918 with the loss of all her 37 crew.

== Rediscovery ==
An expedition mounted in 2004 as part of the Channel 4 Wreck Detectives underwater archaeological TV series to survey a previously unidentified U-boat wreck that had been located earlier at 50.611°N 5.005°W, during a routine survey by the Royal Navy, confirmed the identity of the boat as UB-65. Inspection of the wreck by nautical archaeologist Innes McCartney and U-boat historian Dr. Axel Niestlé (through identification of design features such as the type of deck gun, and identification numbers that were stamped on one of her propellers) proved conclusively that the wreck was that of UB-65. A survey of the wreck showed no obvious indication of weapon attack being the cause of loss (although this could not be ruled out; damage assessment expert David Manley determined that shock damage from a depth charge attack could have caused loss through failure of internal seawater systems and hull penetrations that would not be obvious from an external examination). The aft hatches were open, indicating a possible attempt by at least some of the crew to escape from the vessel. Consideration of the various observations of the wreck, along with historical observations regarding depth control and handling difficulties on diving experienced by other boats of the class, led to a conclusion that she was most likely lost through accidental causes on or after 14 July 1918, the date of the sinking of a Portuguese vessel in the Padstow area. All of her crew of 37 were listed as lost. Having been identified as UB-65, the wreck was given protected place status under the Protection of Military Remains Act 1986 on 1 November 2006.

== Previous beliefs regarding loss ==
The identification of the Padstow U-boat wreck corrected the earlier accepted version of UB-65's loss. According to official German Naval records the boat was presumed lost following a premature explosion of one of her own torpedoes on 10 July 1918, south of the Irish coast.

According to United States Navy records it was reported that, whilst returning from patrol and near Fastnet Rock, the U.S. submarine L-2 observed what the captain Paul F. Foster first took to be a buoy on the horizon. Moving closer, Captain Foster found that it was actually a German submarine, only later to be identified as UB-65. It was listing heavily on the water's surface, seemingly disabled. Forster guided his sub around it, hoping to line up a torpedo shot. But before he could do so, the crippled vessel was torn apart by a huge explosion. UB-65 rose up on its bows and sank. There were no survivors and no bodies were ever recovered. The sound of small propellers and an underwater signalling device could be heard for a short while after the explosion. The cause of the explosion was not known.

RECORD ITEM Y1022 ROLL ONI ROLL
PG 61825 58 TA-17-D

Admiralstab der Marine, Abt. A, KTB, Band 1, U.B.65 der V.U.Flottille und der II. U. Flottille.

Kommandant: Kaptlt. Schelle.
U.B.65 conducted operations in the Irish Sea, the western Hebrides, and St George's Channel.
U.B.65 sank among other vessels an unidentified British armed vessel (probably the sloop HMS Arbutus) on 15 December 1917; the Norwegian steamer "Havana" (1,150 t), 5 March 1918; and the British steamer "Pensilva" (4,316 t), 4 May 1918.
U.B.65 departed from Heligoland 2 July 1918, for war operations and was accidentally sunk on 10 July 1918.

_{National Archives and Records Service, U.S. General Services Administration, Washington: 1984}

== Allegations of haunting ==
UB-65 is the subject of many tales of a ghost, said to be the second officer, Lieutenant Richter, who was killed when a torpedo exploded fairly early in the U-boat's career. Indeed, the building of the ship was plagued by disaster, including asphyxiation of three crew members by diesel fumes in the engine room and the crushing of two more by a falling girder. While UB-65 was being tested for seaworthiness, one of the crew members was swept overboard when he was inspecting the hatches. He was never seen again. During the first test dive of UB-65, a fracture occurred in a ballast tank, causing the submarine to sink to the bottom of the sea. The crew lacked any means of renewing the oxygen in the vessel, but after 12 hours the crew finally managed to raise the submarine to the surface of the ocean. These incidents may have given rise to a belief among the crew that the ship was cursed. As no one wanted to board or be stationed on the ship, it is believed that the German Imperial Navy called a priest on board to exorcise the ship. In his book "Tales of Real Haunting", Tony Allan quotes "According to one source, the American officer thought he saw someone on deck just before UB-65 went down. It was a figure in a German officer's overcoat, standing near the bow with folded arms. If this can be believed, Lieutenant Richter may have put in a final appearance".

According to researchers George Behe and Michael Goss, the stories about hauntings from UB-65 were invented by the journalist Hector Charles Bywater, who wrote about the subject. They speculated that Bywater was a good story teller who had invented some of his references, such as a post-war pamphlet written by a "Dr. Hecht". Behe and Goss concluded that "Official documents make it extremely difficult to believe that UB-65 was haunted... The responsibility for that rumor-like legend in all its dramatic detail cannot be traced back with any certainty before Hector C. Bywater."

== Summary of raiding history ==
| Date | Name | Nationality | Tonnage (Note: Merchant ship tonnages are in gross register tons. Military vessels are listed by tons displacement.) | Fate |
|---|---|---|---|---|
| 31 October 1917 | Margrete | Denmark | 1,277 | Damaged |
| 12 December 1917 | Bellville | Sweden | 992 | Sunk |
| 12 December 1917 | Charleston | United Kingdom | 1,866 | Sunk |
| 14 December 1917 | Nor | Norway | 1,418 | Sunk |
| 16 December 1917 | HMS Arbutus | Royal Navy | 1,290 | Sunk |
| 2 March 1918 | Havna | Norway | 1,150 | Sunk |
| 4 May 1918 | Pensilva | United Kingdom | 4,316 | Damaged |
| 5 May 1918 | Pandora | United Kingdom | 85 | Damaged |
| 5 May 1918 | M. J. Hedley | United Kingdom | 449 | Damaged |
| 8 May 1918 | Elizabetta | United Kingdom | 335 | Damaged |
| 8 May 1918 | Thoralf | Denmark | 586 | Sunk |
| 13 May 1918 | Esperanza De Larrinaga | United Kingdom | 4,981 | Damaged |
| 14 July 1918 | Maria Jose | Portugal | 185 | Sunk |

== Bibliography ==
- Gröner, Erich; Jung, Dieter; Maass, Martin (1991). German Warships 1815–1945, U-boats and Mine Warfare Vessels. Vol. 2. Translated by Thomas, Keith; Magowan, Rachel. London: Conway Maritime Press. ISBN 0-85177-593-4.
- Rössler, Eberhard (1979). Die deutschen U-Boote und ihre Werften: eine Bilddokumentation über den deutschen U-Bootbau; in zwei Bänden (in German). Vol. I. Munich: Bernard & Graefe. ISBN 3-7637-5213-7.
