= SM UB-31 =

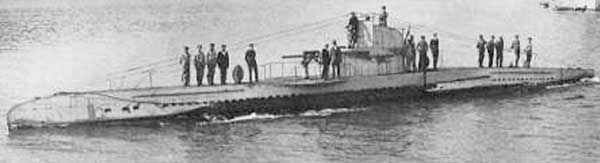
- SM UB-45, a U-boat similar to UB-31

History

German Empire
- Name: UB-31
- Ordered: 22 July 1915
- Builder: Blohm & Voss, Hamburg
- Cost: 1,152,000 German Papiermark
- Yard number: 255
- Launched: 16 November 1915
- Completed: 24 March 1916
- Commissioned: 25 March 1916
- Fate: Sunk 2 May 1918

General characteristics
- Class & type: Type UB II submarine
- Displacement: 274 t (270 long tons) surfaced; 303 t (298 long tons) submerged
- Length: 36.90 m (121 ft 1 in) o/a; 27.90 m (91 ft 6 in) pressure hull
- Beam: 4.37 m (14 ft 4 in) o/a; 3.85 m (12 ft 8 in) pressure hull
- Draught: 3.69 m (12 ft 1 in)
- Propulsion: 1 × propeller shaft; 2 × 6-cylinder diesel engine, 270 PS (200 kW; 270 bhp); 2 × electric motor, 280 PS (210 kW; 280 shp)
- Speed: 9.06 knots (16.78 km/h; 10.43 mph) surfaced; 5.71 knots (10.57 km/h; 6.57 mph) submerged
- Range: 7,030 nmi (13,020 km; 8,090 mi) at 5 knots (9.3 km/h; 5.8 mph) surfaced; 45 nmi (83 km; 52 mi) at 4 knots (7.4 km/h; 4.6 mph) submerged
- Test depth: 50 m (160 ft)
- Complement: 2 officers, 21 men
- Armament: 2 × 50 cm (19.7 in) torpedo tubes; 4 × torpedoes (later 6); 1 × 8.8 cm (3.5 in) Uk L/30 deck gun
- Notes: 42-second diving time

Service record
- Part of: Baltic Flotilla; 16 May 1916 – 24 February 1917; Flandern Flotilla; 24 February 1917 – 2 May 1918
- Commanders: Oblt.z.S. Karl Vesper; 18 March – 11 August 1916; Oblt.z.S. Thomas Bieber; 12 August 1916 – 31 January 1918; Oblt.z.S. Wilhelm Braun; 1 February – 2 May 1918
- Operations: 25 patrols
- Victories: 27 merchant ships sunk (73,810 GRT); 8 merchant ships damaged (34,699 GRT)

SM UB-31 (Note: "SM" stands for "Seiner Majestät" (English: His Majesty's) and combined with the U for Unterseeboot would be translated as His Majesty's Submarine.) was a German Type UB II submarine or U-boat in the German Imperial Navy (German: Kaiserliche Marine) during World War I. The U-boat was ordered on 22 July 1915 and launched on 16 November 1915. She was commissioned into the German Imperial Navy on 25 March 1916 as SM UB-31.

The submarine sank 27 ships in 25 patrols. UB-31 was depth charged and sunk by British warships HMS Lord Leitrim, HMS Loyal Friend, and HMS Ocean Roamer in the English Channel on 2 May 1918. Alternatively she may have been sunk by a mine on that date.

== Design ==
A Type UB II submarine, UB-31 had a displacement of 274 tonnes (270 long tons) when at the surface and 303 tonnes (298 long tons) while submerged. She had a total length of 36.90 m (121 ft 1 in), a beam of 4.37 m (14 ft 4 in), and a draught of 3.69 m (12 ft 1 in). The submarine was powered by two Benz six-cylinder diesel engines producing a total 270 metric horsepower (270 shp; 200 kW), two Siemens-Schuckert electric motors producing 280 metric horsepower (210 kW; 280 shp), and one propeller shaft. She was capable of operating at depths of up to 50 metres (160 ft).

The submarine had a maximum surface speed of 9.06 knots (16.78 km/h; 10.43 mph) and a maximum submerged speed of 5.71 knots (10.57 km/h; 6.57 mph). When submerged, she could operate for 45 nautical miles (83 km; 52 mi) at 4 knots (7.4 km/h; 4.6 mph); when surfaced, she could travel 7,030 nautical miles (13,020 km; 8,090 mi) at 5 knots (9.3 km/h; 5.8 mph). UB-31 was fitted with two 50 centimetres (20 in) torpedo tubes, four torpedoes, and one 8.8 cm (3.5 in) Uk L/30 deck gun. She had a complement of twenty-one crew members and two officers and a 42-second dive time.

== Summary of raiding history ==
Date	Name	Nationality	Tonnage (Note: Tonnages are in gross register tons)	Fate
9 April 1917	Kittiwake	United Kingdom	1,866	Sunk
24 April 1917	Saint Jacques	France	415	Damaged
28 April 1917	Medina	United Kingdom	12,350	Sunk
21 May 1917	City of Corinth	United Kingdom	5,870	Sunk
15 June 1917	Teesdale	United Kingdom	2,470	Damaged
17 June 1917	Stanhope	United Kingdom	2,854	Sunk
5 July 1917	Ocean Swell	United Kingdom	195	Sunk
6 July 1917	Ariadne Christine	United Kingdom	3,550	Damaged
7 July 1917	Bellucia	United Kingdom	4,368	Sunk
10 July 1917	Hildegard	United States	622	Sunk
11 July 1917	Brunhilda	United Kingdom	2,296	Sunk
1 August 1917	Alcyone	United Kingdom	149	Sunk
1 August 1917	Laertes	United Kingdom	4,541	Sunk
2 August 1917	Newlyn	United Kingdom	4,019	Sunk
3 August 1917	Renee Marthe	France	49	Sunk
8 August 1917	Algerie	France	3,386	Damaged
8 September 1917	Elizabeth	United Kingdom	58	Sunk
9 September 1917	Pluton	Norway	1,449	Sunk
19 October 1917	Waikawa	United Kingdom	5,666	Sunk
20 October 1917	Colorado	United Kingdom	7,165	Sunk
23 October 1917	Lepanto	United Kingdom	6,389	Damaged
19 November 1917	Farn	United Kingdom	4,393	Sunk
13 December 1917	Britannic	United Kingdom	92	Sunk
15 December 1917	Sachem	United Kingdom	5,354	Damaged
18 December 1917	Riversdale	United Kingdom	2,805	Sunk
20 December 1917	Alice Marie	United Kingdom	2,210	Sunk
20 December 1917	Eveline	United Kingdom	2,605	Sunk
20 December 1917	Warsaw	United Kingdom	608	Sunk
22 January 1918	Admiral Cochrane	United Kingdom	6,565	Damaged
22 January 1918	Greatham	United Kingdom	2,338	Sunk
24 January 1918	Elsa	Norway	3,581	Sunk
28 February 1918	Heenvliet	Netherlands	492	Sunk
20 March 1918	Boorara	Australia	6,570	Damaged
24 April 1918	Agnete	United Kingdom	1,127	Sunk
25 April 1918	Joseph	France	42	Sunk

== Bibliography ==
- Bendert, Harald (2000). Die UB-Boote der Kaiserlichen Marine, 1914-1918. Einsätze, Erfolge, Schicksal (in German). Hamburg: Verlag E.S. Mittler & Sohn GmbH. ISBN 3-8132-0713-7.
- Gröner, Erich; Jung, Dieter; Maass, Martin (1991). U-boats and Mine Warfare Vessels. German Warships 1815–1945. Vol. 2. Translated by Thomas, Keith; Magowan, Rachel. London: Conway Maritime Press. ISBN 0-85177-593-4.
- Rössler, Eberhard (1979). Die deutschen U-Boote und ihre Werften: eine Bilddokumentation über den deutschen U-Bootbau; in zwei Bänden (in German). Vol. I. Munich: Bernard & Graefe. ISBN 3-7637-5213-7.
