= SM U-105 =

World War I German submarine

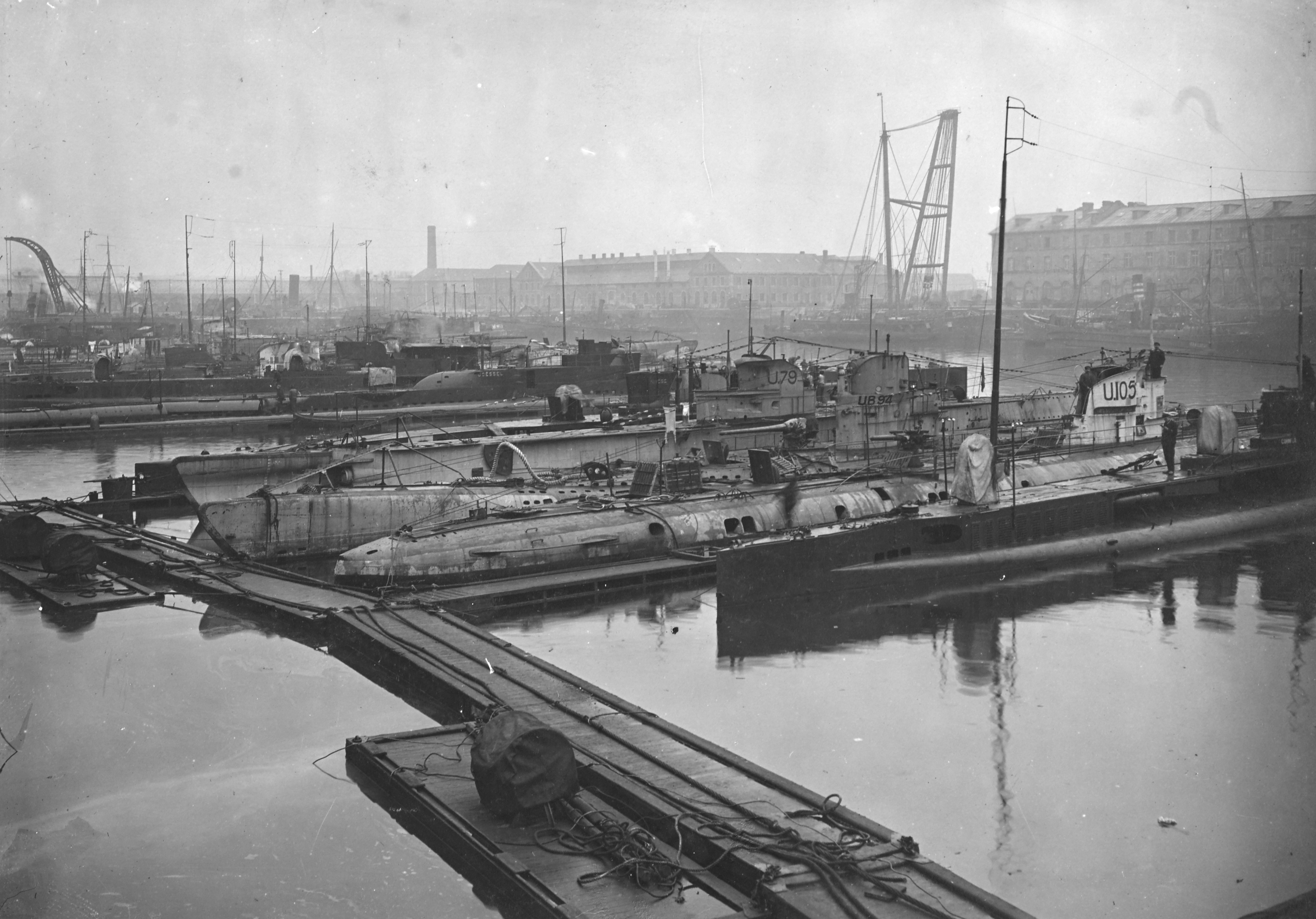
- U-105 in Cherbourg around 1920

History

German Empire
- Name: U-105
- Ordered: 5 May 1916
- Builder: Germaniawerft, Kiel
- Yard number: 274
- Launched: 16 May 1917
- Commissioned: 4 July 1917
- Fate: Surrendered to France 20 November 1918

France
- Name: Jean Autric
- Namesake: Jean Autric
- Acquired: 1918
- Stricken: 27 January 1937
- Fate: Sold for scrap, 1938

General characteristics
- Class & type: Type U 93 submarine
- Displacement: 798 t (785 long tons) surfaced; 1,000 t (980 long tons) submerged
- Length: 71.55 m (234 ft 9 in) (o/a); 56.05 m (183 ft 11 in) (pressure hull)
- Beam: 6.30 m (20 ft 8 in) (o/a); 4.15 m (13 ft 7 in) (pressure hull)
- Height: 8.25 m (27 ft 1 in)
- Draught: 3.90 m (12 ft 10 in)
- Installed power: 2 × 2,400 PS (1,765 kW; 2,367 shp) surfaced; 2 × 1,200 PS (883 kW; 1,184 shp) submerged
- Propulsion: 2 shafts, 2 × 1.70 m (5 ft 7 in) propellers
- Speed: 16.4 knots (30.4 km/h; 18.9 mph) surfaced; 8.4 knots (15.6 km/h; 9.7 mph) submerged
- Range: 9,280 nmi (17,190 km; 10,680 mi) at 8 knots (15 km/h; 9.2 mph) surfaced; 50 nmi (93 km; 58 mi) at 5 knots (9.3 km/h; 5.8 mph) submerged
- Test depth: 50 m (164 ft 1 in)
- Complement: 4 officers, 32 enlisted
- Armament: 6 × 50 cm (19.7 in) torpedo tubes (four bow, two stern); 12-16 torpedoes; 1 × 10.5 cm (4.1 in) SK L/45 deck gun; 1 × 8.8 cm (3.5 in) SK L/30 deck gun

Service record
- Part of: Imperial German Navy: IV Flotilla; 3 September 1917 – 11 November 1918
- Commanders: Kptlt. Friedrich Strackerjan; 4 July 1917 – 11 November 1918
- Operations: 6 patrols
- Victories: 18 merchant ships sunk (48,956 GRT); 1 auxiliary warship sunk (6,878 GRT); 2 merchant ships damaged (Unknown GRT)

SM U-105 (Note: "SM" stands for "Seiner Majestät" (English: His Majesty's) and combined with the U for Unterseeboot would be translated as His Majesty's Submarine.) was one of the 329 submarines serving in the Imperial German Navy in World War I. U-105 was engaged in the naval warfare and took part in the First Battle of the Atlantic. After the war she was ceded to France, where the unit served as Jean Autric until being scrapped in 1938.

On 17 October 1917, SM U-105 met Antilles, an American troop transport, during the return leg of a voyage to Europe. Antilles was torpedoed by the submerged U-boat and went down just five minutes after being hit. A total of 67 persons were killed in the sinking, making the destruction of Antilles the event costing the single greatest number of American lives in the war to that date.

== Design ==
Type U 93 submarines were preceded by the shorter Type U 87 submarines. U-105 had a displacement of 798 tonnes (785 long tons) when at the surface and 1,000 tonnes (980 long tons) while submerged. She had a total length of 71.55 m (234 ft 9 in), a pressure hull length of 56.05 m (183 ft 11 in), a beam of 6.30 m (20 ft 8 in), a height of 8.25 m (27 ft 1 in), and a draught of 3.90 m (12 ft 10 in). The submarine was powered by two 2,400 metric horsepower (1,800 kW; 2,400 shp) engines for use while surfaced, and two 1,200 metric horsepower (880 kW; 1,200 shp) engines for use while submerged. The boat had two propeller shafts and two 1.70 m (5 ft 7 in) propellers. She was capable of operating at depths of up to 50 metres (160 ft).

The submarine had a maximum surface speed of 16.4 knots (30.4 km/h; 18.9 mph) and a maximum submerged speed of 8.4 knots (15.6 km/h; 9.7 mph). When submerged, she could operate for 50 nautical miles (93 km; 58 mi) at 5 knots (9.3 km/h; 5.8 mph); when surfaced, she could travel 9,280 nautical miles (17,190 km; 10,680 mi) at 8 knots (15 km/h; 9.2 mph). U-105 was fitted with six 50 centimetres (20 in) torpedo tubes (four at the bow and two at the stern), twelve to sixteen torpedoes, one 10.5 cm (4.1 in) SK L/45, and one 8.8 cm (3.5 in) SK L/30 deck gun. She had a complement of thirty-six (thirty-two crew members and four officers).

== Summary of raiding history ==
Date	Name	Nationality	Tonnage (Note: Tonnages are in gross register tons)	Fate
14 October 1917	Ecaterini C. D.	Greece	3,739	Sunk
15 October 1917	Saint Paul	France	79	Sunk
15 October 1917	St. Helens	United States	1,497	Sunk
17 October 1917	Antilles	United States Army	6,878	Sunk
19 December 1917	Vinovia	United Kingdom	7,046	Sunk
22 December 1917	Colemere	United Kingdom	2,120	Sunk
24 December 1917	Canova	United Kingdom	4,637	Sunk
28 December 1917	Lord Derby	United Kingdom	3,757	Sunk
24 February 1918	Sarpfos	Norway	1,458	Sunk
26 February 1918	Dalewood	United Kingdom	2,420	Sunk
27 February 1918	Largo	United Kingdom	1,764	Sunk
1 March 1918	Penvearn	United Kingdom	3,710	Sunk
2 March 1918	Carmelite	United Kingdom	2,583	Sunk
29 April 1918	Christiana Davis	United Kingdom	86	Sunk
29 April 1918	Johnny Toole	United Kingdom	84	Sunk
7 May 1918	Nantes	United Kingdom	1,580	Sunk
7 May 1918	Saxon	United Kingdom	1,595	Sunk
2 July 1918	Pieuse Paysanne	France	unknown	Damaged
2 July 1918	Albert 1er	France	unknown	Damaged
31 August 1918	Milwaukee	United Kingdom	7,323	Sunk
7 September 1918	Ruysdael	United Kingdom	3,478	Sunk

== Bibliography ==
- Gröner, Erich; Jung, Dieter; Maass, Martin (1991). U-boats and Mine Warfare Vessels. German Warships 1815–1945. Vol. 2. Translated by Thomas, Keith; Magowan, Rachel. London: Conway Maritime Press. ISBN 0-85177-593-4.
