= Colemere Countryside Site =

Countryside heritage site in Shropshire, England

Coordinates: 52.8901°N 2.8405°W

Colemere Countryside Site is a countryside heritage site. Due to its important conservation status it has two key designations being a Site of Special Scientific Interest (SSSI) and an internationally important Ramsar wetland site. 3 miles (4.8 km) south-east of Ellesmere, Shropshire.

== Recreational activities ==
A number of walking routes are available locally, mostly of a moderate length, but including a recently established family-friendly route. Other than walking, the mere is often used for sailing by the Colemere Sailing Club at different times in the year. The Sailing Club has recently undergone a renovation which includes two rescue boats and some purpose-built jetties, using funding from the Sport England Olympic Legacy Fund. The club has been running since 1959.

No public fishing is allowed on the site due to the fishing rights being leased to a private club.

== Background information ==
The main feature of the site is Cole Mere, one of the Shropshire meres, and is nearly completely enclosed by mature woodland and two hay meadows. The site attracts a mixture of wildlife, and is an ideal location for birds such as wildfowl and waders including snipe, curlew, goldeneye and pochard.

Cole Mere is the only English site for the least water-lily. and the meadow in the spring and summer is perfect for flowers such as the southern marsh orchid, meadow cranesbill and lady’s smock. Insects are also abundant, including the brown hawker dragonfly and common blue damselfly.

Because of its wildlife, the site has several formal designations including Local Nature Reserve, Site of Special Scientific Interest and Ramsar site. To protect the site, the public are advised not to remove or collect any plants or animals.

== Management ==
A management plan for Colemere has been agreed on, and seven objectives for the site have been made, some of which include restoring the aquatic/emergent vegetation and aquatic invertebrate fauna in the open standing water habitat, and maintaining the semi-improved neutral and marshy grassland.

The site requires special management to keep the flower-rich meadows, and grazing is considered to be the best method, this is currently being achieved by rare breeds of Hereford cattle in the area.
