= List of shipwrecks in March 1918 =

The list of shipwrecks in March 1918 includes ships sunk, foundered, grounded, or otherwise lost during March 1918.

== 1 March ==
List of shipwrecks: 1 March 1918
Ship	State	Description
SMS A57	Imperial German Navy	World War I: The A56-class torpedo boat struck a mine and sank in the North Sea with the loss of twelve of her crew.
Borga	United Kingdom	World War I: The cargo ship was torpedoed and sunk in the English Channel 9 nautical miles (17 km) south east by south of Beer Head, Devon (50°32′N 2°56′W) by SM U-55 (Imperial German Navy) with the loss of 5 crew.
HMS Calgarian	Royal Navy	World War I: The armed merchant cruiser was torpedoed and sunk in the Irish Sea off Rathlin Island, County Antrim (55°25′N 6°15′W) by SM U-19 (Imperial German Navy) with the loss of 49 crew.
SMS Hermann Siebert	Imperial German Navy	World War I: The Gronland-class Vorpostenboot was sunk by mines north west of Vlieland.
Norefos	Norway	World War I: The supply vessel was scuttled in the Atlantic Ocean 60 nautical miles (110 km) off Dakar, French West Africa.
Penvearn	United Kingdom	World War I: The cargo ship was torpedoed and sunk in the Irish Sea 15 nautical miles (28 km) north of South Stack, Anglesey (53°35′N 4°49′W) by SM U-105 (Imperial German Navy) with the loss of 21 crew.
S #2	United States	While under tow with a cargo of 10 drums containing 11,000 pounds (4,990 kg) of distillates, the 54-gross register ton barge experienced icing, her towline broke, and she sank in the Gulf of Alaska between Kodiak and Chignik, Territory of Alaska.
Sunrise	United Kingdom	The ketch struck a submerged wreck and sank.
HMT Thomas Collard	Royal Navy	World War I: The naval trawler was sunk by the force of the explosions of the torpedoes that sunk HMS Calgarian (Royal Navy), which was a victim of SM U-19 (Imperial German Navy). Her crew survived.

== 2 March ==
List of shipwrecks: 2 March 1918
Ship	State	Description
Bessy	Isle of Man	World War I: The coaster was shelled and sunk in the Irish Sea 12 nautical miles (22 km) north west of Peel by SM U-91 and SM U-105 (both Imperial German Navy). Her crew survived.
Carmelite	United Kingdom	World War I: The cargo ship was torpedoed and sunk in the Irish Sea 10 nautical miles (19 km) south west of the Calf of Man, Isle of Man (54°00′N 4°52′W) by SM U-105 (Imperial German Navy) with the loss of two of her crew.
Euxeinos	Greece	World War I: The cargo ship was sunk in the Mediterranean Sea (32°17′N 32°03′E) by SM UB-53 (Imperial German Navy).
HMS H5	Royal Navy	World War I: The H-class submarine was rammed and sunk by Rutherglen (United Kingdom), which mistook her for a U-boat. All 22 crew were killed.
Havna	Norway	World War I: The cargo ship was sunk in the Irish Sea 20 nautical miles (37 km) east south east of the Tuskar Rock by SM UB-65 (Imperial German Navy) with the loss of eleven of her eighteen crew.
Kenmare	United Kingdom	World War I: The cargo ship was torpedoed and sunk in the Irish Sea 25 nautical miles (46 km) north west of The Skerries, Isle of Anglesey by SM U-104 (Imperial German Navy) with the loss of 29 crew.
Maria	United Kingdom	The schooner foundered with the loss of three of her crew.
Otto Schlick	Imperial German Navy	World War I: The Augustenburg-class Vorpostenboot was sunk by mines off Texel.
Rockpool	United Kingdom	World War I: The cargo ship was torpedoed and sunk in the Atlantic Ocean 12 nautical miles (22 km) north east by north of Eagle Island, County Mayo by SM U-94 (Imperial German Navy). Her crew survived, but her captain was taken as a prisoner of war.
Stina	Sweden	World War I: The cargo ship was torpedoed, shelled and sunk in the Atlantic Ocean 8 nautical miles (15 km) north by east of the Cairns of Coll, Argyllshire, United Kingdom (56°48′N 6°30′W) by SM U-22 (Imperial German Navy). Her crew survived.

== 3 March ==
List of shipwrecks: 3 March 1918
Ship	State	Description
Countess	United Kingdom	The vessel foundered in the English Channel off Deal, Kent. Her crew were rescued by the Deal Lifeboat.
Diamond	United Kingdom	The vessel foundered in the English Channel off Deal. Her crew were rescued by the Deal Lifeboat.
Eliza and Alice	United Kingdom	The vessel foundered in the English Channel off Deal. Her crew were rescued by the Deal Lifeboat.
Navator	United Kingdom	The vessel foundered in the English Channel off Deal. Her crew were rescued by the Deal Lifeboat.
Nikolaus Schoke	Imperial German Navy	World War I: The Ditmar Koel-class Vorpostenboot was sunk by mines off Terschelling.
Puritan	United States	The steamer drifted ashore on Fishers Island, New York after her anchor chain parted in the harbor at New London, Connecticut.
Romeo	United Kingdom	World War I: The refrigerated cargo ship was torpedoed and sunk in the Irish Sea 11 nautical miles (20 km) north west of Peel, Isle of Man (52°22′N 4°52′W) by SM U-102 (Imperial German Navy) with the loss of 26 of her 29 crew. The survivors were rescued by Ardgavel (United Kingdom) and HMS Kilgobnet (Royal Navy).

== 4 March ==
List of shipwrecks: 4 March 1918
Ship	State	Description
Antioco Accame	Italy	World War I: The cargo ship was sunk in the Atlantic Ocean west of Gibraltar (35°11′N 7°55′W) by SM U-155 (Imperial German Navy). Her crew survived.
Castle Eden	United Kingdom	World War I: The collier was torpedoed and sunk in the Atlantic Ocean 4 nautical miles (7.4 km) south south east of the Inishtrahull Lighthouse, County Donegal by SM U-110 (Imperial German Navy) with the loss of a crew member.
Clan Macpherson	United Kingdom	World War I: The cargo ship was torpedoed and sunk in the Mediterranean Sea 24 nautical miles (44 km) north of Cape Serrat, Tunisia (37°47′N 9°05′E) by SM UC-27 (Imperial German Navy) with the loss of eighteen of her crew.
Geneva	United Kingdom	The coaster struck a submerged wreck and was beached. She sank the next day.
Lady Londonderry	United Kingdom	The coaster collided with another vessel and sank.
Northfield	United Kingdom	World War I: The collier was torpedoed and sunk in the Bristol Channel 25 nautical miles (46 km) south west of Lundy Island, Devon (50°55′15″N 4°45′30″W) by SM U-60 (Imperial German Navy) with the loss of fifteen crew.
Polkerris	France	World War I: The cargo ship was sunk in the English Channel 10 nautical miles (19 km) south east of Portland Bill, Dorset, United Kingdom by SM UB-80 (Imperial German Navy). Her crew survived.
Puritan	United States	The 78-gross register ton, 80.6-foot (24.6 m) fishing vessel was wrecked on Montague Island at the entrance to Prince William Sound on the south-central coast of the Territory of Alaska. Her entire crew of 17 survived.

== 5 March ==
List of shipwrecks: 5 March 1918
Ship	State	Description
Coalgas	United Kingdom	World War I: The cargo ship struck a mine and sank in the North Sea 5 nautical miles (9.3 km) south by west of the Shipwash Lightship (United Kingdom). Her crew survived.
Edouard Marie	Belgium	World War I: The fishing vessel was sunk in the Atlantic Ocean 5 nautical miles (9.3 km) south of the Wolf Rock, Cornwall, United Kingdom (49°52′N 5°52′W) by SM UC-75 (Imperial German Navy).
Estrella	United Kingdom	World War I: The cargo ship struck a mine and sank in the North Sea 5 nautical miles (9.3 km) south by west of the Shipwash Lightship (United Kingdom) with the loss of twenty of her crew.
Quarnero	Italy	World War I: The cargo ship was sunk in the Atlantic Ocean 5 nautical miles (9.3 km) north of Portreath, Cornwall, United Kingdom (50°21′N 5°19′W) by SM U-60 (Imperial German Navy).
Roxburgh	United Kingdom	World War I: The cargo ship was torpedoed and sunk in the Mediterranean Sea 15 nautical miles (28 km) east by north of Cape St. John, Crete, Greece by SM UC-74 (Imperial German Navy) with the loss of six of her crew.
Tusnastabb	Norway	World War I: The cargo ship struck a mine and sank in the North Sea south west of the Shipwash Lightship (United Kingdom) (51°57′N 1°43′E). Her crew survived.
Uskmoor	United Kingdom	World War I: The cargo ship was torpedoed and sunk in the English Channel 3 nautical miles (5.6 km) south west of Prawle Point, Devon by SM UB-80 (Imperial German Navy). Her crew survived.
HMT William Tennant	Royal Navy	The naval trawler collided with a British trawler and sank.

== 6 March ==
List of shipwrecks: 6 March 1918
Ship	State	Description
Daiten Maru	Japan	World War I: The cargo ship was sunk in the Mediterranean Sea west of Sicily, Italy by SM U-35 (Imperial German Navy). Her crew survived.
Elector	Portugal	World War I: The sailing vessel was sunk in the Atlantic Ocean off Rio de Oro by SM U-152 (Imperial German Navy).
Francis Inness	United States	The schooner went ashore on Block Island, Rhode Island. Refloated by naval vessels.
Kalgan	United Kingdom	World War I: The cargo ship was torpedoed and sunk in the Mediterranean Sea 33 nautical miles (61 km) south west of Jaffa, Occupied Enemy Territory Administration by SM UB-53 (Imperial German Navy) with the loss of a crew member.
HMT Princess Alice	Royal Navy	The naval trawler was lost in the Mediterranean Sea on this date.

== 7 March ==
List of shipwrecks: 7 March 1918
Ship	State	Description
Begona No.4	Spain	World War I: The cargo ship was shelled and sunk in the Mediterranean Sea 60 nautical miles (110 km) north west of Marettimo, Italy by SM U-35 (Imperial German Navy).
Braatt II	Norway	World War I: The cargo ship was torpedoed and sunk in the English Channel 7 nautical miles (13 km) south west by south of St. Catherine's Point, Isle of Wight, United Kingdom (50°29′N 1°21′W) by SM UB-30 (Imperial German Navy). Her crew survived.
Brise	France	World War I: The sailing vessel was shelled and sunk in the Atlantic Ocean 3.5 nautical miles (6.5 km) north of Trevose Head, Cornwall, United Kingdom (50°36′N 5°03′W) by SM U-55 (Imperial German Navy).
Luigi	Italy	World War I: The cargo ship was sunk in the Atlantic Ocean off Rio de Oro (25°35′N 14°38′W) by SM U-152 (Imperial German Navy). Her crew survived.
Martha	Belgium	World War I: The coaster was torpedoed and sunk in the English Channel 5 nautical miles (9.3 km) west by south of Portland Bill, Dorset, United Kingdom (50°30′N 2°36′W) by SM UB-80 (Imperial German Navy).
Saint Georges	France	World War I: The sailing vessel was shelled and sunk in the Atlantic Ocean 2 nautical miles (3.7 km) north of Trevose Head (50°35′N 5°03′W) by SM U-55 (Imperial German Navy).
Saint Joseph	France	World War I: The three-masted barquentine was shelled and sunk in the Atlantic Ocean 5 nautical miles (9.3 km) north west of Trevose Head (50°36′N 5°08′W) by SM U-55 (Imperial German Navy).
Tarbetness	United Kingdom	World War I: The cargo ship was torpedoed and sunk in the Irish Sea 12 nautical miles (22 km) south west of the Caernarvon Lightship (United Kingdom) by SM U-110 (Imperial German Navy). Her crew survived.
Umatilla	United States	The cargo ship was wrecked when she ran aground north of Inuboyesaki, Japan.
RFA Vitol	Royal Navy	World War I: The tanker was sunk in the Irish Sea (52°38′N 5°04′W) by SM U-110 (Imperial German Navy) with the loss of four crew.

== 8 March ==
List of shipwrecks: 8 March 1918
Ship	State	Description
Ayr	United Kingdom	World War I: The cargo ship was torpedoed and sunk in the Mediterranean Sea 31 nautical miles (57 km) north of Linosa, Italy (36°23′N 13°45′E) by SM UC-27 (Imperial German Navy). Her crew survived.
City of Parkersburg	United States	The steamer struck a sunken barge and sank in deep water in the Ohio River off Russell, Kentucky/Ironton, Ohio.
Corsham	United Kingdom	World War I: The cargo ship was torpedoed and sunk in the North Sea 6 nautical miles (11 km) east south east of the mouth of the River Tees by SM UC-40 (Imperial German Navy) with the loss of nine of her crew.
Erica	United Kingdom	World War I: The schooner was shelled and sunk in the Irish Sea 5 nautical miles (9.3 km) south west of Bardsey Island, Pembrokeshire by SM U-110 (Imperial German Navy). Her crew survived.
Intent	United Kingdom	World War I: The collier was torpedoed and sunk in the North Sea 4 nautical miles (7.4 km) east by north of Seaham, County Durham by SM UC-40 (Imperial German Navy) with the loss of a crew member.
Madeline	United Kingdom	World War I: The cargo ship was torpedoed and sunk in the Atlantic Ocean 14 nautical miles (26 km) east north east of the Pendeen Lighthouse, Cornwall (50°02′N 5°25′W) by SM U-55 (Imperial German Navy) with the loss of three crew.
Uganda	United Kingdom	World War I: The cargo ship was torpedoed and sunk in the Mediterranean Sea 32 nautical miles (59 km) north east by north of Linosa, Italy (36°18′N 13°15′E) by U-28 (Austro-Hungarian Navy) with the loss of a crew member.

== 9 March ==
List of shipwrecks: 9 March 1918
Ship	State	Description
Admiral Evans	United States	The 2,393-gross register ton passenger steamer struck a reef and was beached in a sinking condition in Hawk Inlet (58°05′N 134°46′W) in Southeast Alaska. After her 91 passengers were taken off, she was refloated, repaired, and returned to service.
Grane	Norway	World War I: The cargo ship was sunk in the English Channel 4 nautical miles (7.4 km) west-southwest of Portland Bill, Dorset, United Kingdom by SM UB-80 (Imperial German Navy) with the loss of two of her crew.
Hindenburg	Germany	World War I: Finnish Civil War: The icebreaker struck a mine and sank in the Baltic Sea off Åland, Sweden. Three of her crew killed, five wounded. The wreck was found in 1995 at a depth of 50 metres (160 ft) by dive instructor Richard Johansson from Maltaproffsen and his crew from Ålands Dykcenter and FF-Dyk.
Jolanda	Italy	World War I: The brigantine was scuttled in the Mediterranean Sea northeast of Sardinia (41°25′N 9°40′E) by the submarine SM UC-67 (Imperial German Navy). Her crew survived.
Marguerite	United Kingdom	World War I: The fishing smack was shelled, captured and scuttled with explosives in the Irish Sea off Barrow-in-Furness, Lancashire, England, 25 miles North east of Beaumaris, Isle of Anglesey, Wales by the submarine SM UC-75 (Imperial German Navy). Her three crew was later released and put in "Sunrise"'s boat, they made it to shore.
Nanny Wignall	United Kingdom	World War I: The schooner was sunk by gunfire in the Atlantic Ocean 14 nautical miles (26 km) southeast by south of the Tusker Rock, Ireland, by the submarine SM U-110 (Imperial German Navy). Her crew survived.
Pasqualina	Italy	World War I: The schooner was scuttled in the Mediterranean Sea northeast of Sardinia by the submarine SM UC-67 (Imperial German Navy).
Randelsborg	Denmark	World War I: The cargo ship was sunk in the Skagerrak 20 nautical miles (37 km) southeast of Oscö, Denmark, by the submarine SM UB-34 (Imperial German Navy). Her crew survived.
Silverdale	United Kingdom	World War I: The cargo ship was torpedoed and sunk in the Mediterranean Sea 28 nautical miles (52 km) east by north of the Cani Rocks, Tunisia, by the submarine SM U-35 (Imperial German Navy). Her crew survived.
Udala Mendi	Spain	The cargo ship collided with a British merchant vessel and sank. Her crew were rescued.

== 10 March ==
List of shipwrecks: 10 March 1918
Ship	State	Description
Chagres	United Kingdom	World War I: The passenger ship was torpedoed and sunk in the Mediterranean Sea 62 nautical miles (115 km) east north east of Cape Drepano, Crete, Greece by SM UC-74 (Imperial German Navy) with the loss of one life.
HMT Columba	Royal Navy	World War I: The naval trawler struck a mine and sank in the Firth of Forth 2 nautical miles (3.7 km) off the Isle of May, Fife (56°10′N 2°34′W) with the loss of five of her crew.
Cristina	Spain	World War I: The cargo ship was torpedoed and sunk in the Atlantic Ocean 15 nautical miles (28 km) south west of Trevose Head, Cornwall, United Kingdom (50°23′N 5°13′W) by SM U-55 (Imperial German Navy). Her crew survived.
HMT Endeavour	Royal Navy	The 101.7-foot (31.0 m), 156-ton steam naval trawler/boom defense ship hit the boom off Kirkwall and sank.
Germaine	France	World War I: The cargo ship was torpedoed and sunk in the Atlantic Ocean 2 nautical miles (3.7 km) off Pentire Head, Cornwall (50°37′N 4°58′W) by SM U-110 (Imperial German Navy).
Hampshire	United States	The barge, under tow of Mars (United States), foundered in a severe gale near Five Fathom Bank light station. All 4 hands died.
SMS M91	Imperial German Navy	World War I: The Type 1916 minesweeper struck a mine and sank in the North Sea.
Prince Charles de Belgique	Belgium	The cargo ship collided with Firtree (United Kingdom) in the English Channel, 3 to 4 nautical miles (5.6 to 7.4 km) east of Bull Point 51°20′N 4°06′W and sank. Her ten crew were rescued.
Skrymer	Norway	World War I: The cargo ship was torpedoed and sunk in the Atlantic Ocean 2 nautical miles (3.7 km) off Pendeen, Cornwall (50°11′N 5°40′W) by SM UC-77 (Imperial German Navy) with the loss of two of her crew.
Sunrise	United Kingdom	World War I: The 69.2-foot (21.1 m), 56-ton fishing smack was captured and scuttled with explosives in the Irish Sea 10 nautical miles (19 km) south east of Maughold Head, Isle of Man by SM UC-75 (Imperial German Navy). Her crew and the crew of "Margurite" were put on her boat and released. They made it to shore.
SM UB-58	Imperial German Navy	World War I: The Type UB III submarine struck a mine and sank in the English Channel (51°00′N 1°19′E) with the loss of all 35 crew.
Wave	United Kingdom	World War I: The 23-ton fishing smack was scuttled in the Irish Sea 10 nautical miles (19 km) south west by west of St Bees Head, Cumberland by SM UC-75 (Imperial German Navy). Her crew survived.

== 11 March ==
List of shipwrecks: 11 March 1918
Ship	State	Description
HMT Frigate Bird	Royal Navy	The naval trawler was lost on this date.
Stolt Nielsen	United Kingdom	World War I: The cargo ship was torpedoed and sunk in the Mediterranean Sea 38 nautical miles (70 km) south of Dellimara Point, Malta (35°10′N 14°40′E) by SM U-28 (Austro-Hungarian Navy). Her crew survived.
Tripoli	Italy	World War I: The barque was scuttled in the Mediterranean Sea off Toulon, Var, France by SM UC-67 (Imperial German Navy).
SM UB-17	Imperial German Navy	World War I: The Type UB I submarine departed Zeebrugge, West Flanders, Belgium on patrol. No further trace, lost with all eighteen crew.
SM UB-54	Imperial German Navy	World War I: The Type UB III submarine departed for a patrol in the English Channel. Sunk on 11 March 1918 at 53°15′N 0°45′E by destroyers HMS Sturgeon, Thruster, and Retriever (all Royal Navy) using depth charges, lost with all 29 crew.
W. A. Massey	United Kingdom	World War I: The trawler struck a mine and sank in the Atlantic Ocean 4 nautical miles (7.4 km) west by north of Handa Island, Sutherland with the loss of ten of her crew.
William A. Bisso	United States	The ocean going tug was sunk in a collision with Cohauila (Mexico) in the Mississippi River at Point Celest Bend 50 miles (80 km) below New Orleans, Louisiana. Her captain and eight crew were killed, 8 rescued.
William P. Palmer	United States	The steamer stranded on Great Ledge at the entrance to the harbor at New Bedford, Massachusetts. Refloated and returned to service.

== 12 March ==
List of shipwrecks: 12 March 1918
Ship	State	Description
HMS D3	Royal Navy	World War I: The D-class submarine was bombed and sunk in the English Channel by the French airship AT-0 with the loss of all 25 crew.
Gaupen	United Kingdom	World War I: The cargo ship struck a mine and sank in the English Channel 5 nautical miles (9.3 km) south east by east of North Foreland, Kent.
Kershaw	United States	The steamer went ashore near Shinnecock Hills, New York. Refloated and returned to service.
No. 3	Imperial Russian Navy	The No. 1-class submarine was lost on the Danube.
Nordkyn	Norway	World War I: The cargo ship was sunk in the Atlantic Ocean (34°12′N 10°17′W) by SM U-154 (Imperial German Navy). Her crew survived.
Oswin	Sweden	World War I: The cargo ship was sunk in the North Sea 40 nautical miles (74 km) east north east of St Abb's Head, Berwickshire, United Kingdom by SM UB-62 (Imperial German Navy). Her crew survived.

== 13 March ==
List of shipwrecks: 13 March 1918
Ship	State	Description
SMS A56	Imperial German Navy	World War I: The A56-class torpedo boat struck a mine and sank in the North Sea with the loss of sixteen of her crew.
Adine	Norway	World War I: The cargo ship was torpedoed and sunk in the North Sea 8 nautical miles (15 km) off the Heugh Battery, Hartlepool, County Durham, United Kingdom (54°42′N 0°58′E) by SM UB-34 (Imperial German Navy). Her crew survived.
HMT Adrian	Royal Navy	The naval trawler was lost on this date.
A. E. Whyland	United States	World War I: The whaler was sunk in the Atlantic Ocean 55 nautical miles (102 km) off Tenerife, Canary Islands, Spain (27°02′N 16°26′W) by SM U-152 (Imperial German Navy). Her crew survived.
Arno Mendi	Spain	World War I: The cargo ship was torpedoed and sunk in the Irish Sea 14 nautical miles (26 km) south of the Stack Lighthouse by SM UC-75 (Imperial German Navy).
Crayford	United Kingdom	World War I: The cargo ship was torpedoed and sunk in the North Sea 110 nautical miles (200 km) west by south of Skudesneshavn, Rogaland, Norway by SM U-46 (Imperial German Navy) with the loss of a crew member.
Lisette	United Kingdom	World War I: The cargo ship was torpedoed and sunk in the North Sea 8 nautical miles (15 km) north east by north of the Shipwash Lightship (United Kingdom) by a Kaiserliche Marine submarine with the loss of a crew member.
Londonier	Belgium	World War I: The cargo ship was torpedoed and sunk in the English Channel south of the Isle of Wight, United Kingdom (50°31′N 1°19′W) by SM UC-71 (Imperial German Navy)
HMT Nexus	Royal Navy	The naval trawler was lost on this date.
S. Francesco Di Paola D.	Italy	World War I: The sailing vessel was sunk in the Tyrrhenian Sea 70 nautical miles (130 km) south of Naples (39°45′N 12°38′E) by SM UB-49 (Imperial German Navy).
Tweed	United Kingdom	World War I: The collier was torpedoed and sunk in the English Channel 10 nautical miles (19 km) south by west of St. Catherine's Point, Isle of Wight by SM UB-59 (Imperial German Navy) with the loss of seven of her crew.
Wegadesk	Norway	World War I: The cargo ship was scuttled in the Atlantic Ocean west of Gibraltar by SM U-155 (Imperial German Navy). Her crew survived.

== 14 March ==
List of shipwrecks: 14 March 1918
Ship	State	Description
A. A. Raven	United States	World War I: The cargo ship was sunk in the Atlantic Ocean 15 nautical miles (28 km) south of the Wolf Rock, Cornwall, United Kingdom (49°41′N 5°50′W) by SM UB-55 (Imperial German Navy) with the loss of seven crew.
HMT Agate	Royal Navy	World War I: The naval trawler struck a mine and sank in the English Channel off the Royal Sovereign Lightship (United Kingdom) with the loss of four of her crew. by SM UC-71 (Imperial German Navy). Her crew survived.
Amulet	United Kingdom	The cargo ship collided with a Norwegian merchant vessel and sank. Her crew were rescued.
HMS Ardandearg	Royal Navy	World War I: The collier was torpedoed and sunk in the Mediterranean Sea 86 nautical miles (159 km) east of Malta by SM UC-54 (Imperial German Navy) with the loss of two of her crew.
Arpillao	Spain	World War I: The cargo ship was sunk in the Atlantic Ocean off Las Palmas, Canary Islands (29°08′N 14°53′W) by SM U-157 (Imperial German Navy). Her crew survived.
Carla	Norway	World War I: The barque was shelled and sunk in the English Channel 56 nautical miles (104 km) north west by north of Le Havre, Seine-Inférieure, France by SM UB-33 (Imperial German Navy). Her crew survived.
Castleford	United Kingdom	World War I: The cargo ship was torpedoed and sunk in the North Sea 2 nautical miles (3.7 km) east by north of Robin Hood's Bay, Yorkshire by SM UC-40 (Imperial German Navy). Her crew survived.
Jeanne	France	World War I: The schooner was scuttled in the Gulf of Lion (42°32′N 4°10′E) by SM UC-67 (Imperial German Navy).
Jeanne Marie	France	World War I: The cargo ship struck a mine and sank in the English Channel off Sark, Channel Islands (49°20′N 2°22′W).
Principessa Laetitia	Italy	World War I: The cargo ship was sunk in the Tyrrhenian Sea off Ponza by SM UB-49 (Imperial German Navy). Her crew survived.
Tweed	United Kingdom	World War I: The cargo ship was torpedoed and sunk in St. George's Channel 15 nautical miles (28 km) south south east of the Tuskar Rock, Ireland (52°11′N 5°50′W) by SM UC-75 (Imperial German Navy). Her crew survived.
Venezuela	France	World War I: The coaster was sunk in the English Channel off the Isle of Wight, United Kingdom by SM UB-59 (Imperial German Navy) with the loss of all hands.

== 15 March ==
List of shipwrecks: 15 March 1918
Ship	State	Description
Adriatico	Italy	The cargo ship collided with a British merchant vessel and sank.
Alessandra	Italy	World War I: The full-rigged ship was scuttled in the Atlantic Ocean west of Madeira, Portugal (33°21′N 21°00′W) by SM U-153 (Imperial German Navy).
Amazon	United Kingdom	World War I: The ocean liner was torpedoed and sunk in the Atlantic Ocean off Malin Head, County Donegal (55°49′N 8°06′W) by SM U-110 (Imperial German Navy). Her crew survived.
Armonia	Canada	World War I: The cargo ship was torpedoed and sunk in the Mediterranean Sea 38 nautical miles (70 km) off Porquerolles, Var, France by SM UC-67 (Imperial German Navy) with the loss of seven of her crew.
Carrie A. Lane	United States	The schooner foundered in the Gulf of Guinea off Assinie, French West Africa.
Clan Macdougall	United Kingdom	World War I: The cargo ship was sunk in the Mediterranean Sea 60 nautical miles (110 km) south of Cape Carbonara, Sardinia, Italy by SM UB-49 (Imperial German Navy) with the loss of 33 crew.
Greta	Imperial German Navy	World War I: The Greta-class Vorpostenboot was sunk by mines off Blaavand Point.
Severn	United Kingdom	The coaster collided with the Widnes-Runcorn Transporter Bridge and sank in the River Mersey with the loss of all three crew.
Sparkling Foam	United Kingdom	World War I: The three-masted sailing vessel was scuttled in the English Channel 9 nautical miles (17 km) south east of Beer Head, Devon by SM UB-33 (Imperial German Navy). Her crew survived.
SM U-110	Imperial German Navy	World War I: The Type U 93 submarine was depth charged and sunk in the Atlantic Ocean off Malin Head (54°49′N 8°06′W) by HMS Michael and HMS Moresby (both Royal Navy) with the loss of all 39 crew.
SM UB-106	Imperial German Navy	The Type UB III submarine sank at Kiel, Schleswig-Holstein (54°42′N 10°09′E) with the loss of all 35 crew. She was raised on 18 March, repaired and returned to service.

== 16 March ==
List of shipwrecks: 16 March 1918
Ship	State	Description
Ellaston	United Kingdom	World War I: The collier was scuttled in the Atlantic Ocean 180 nautical miles (330 km) off the Canary Islands, Spain by SM U-152 (Imperial German Navy). Her crew survived, but her captain was taken as a prisoner of war.
Lightfoot	United Kingdom	World War I: The cargo ship was torpedoed and sunk in the English Channel 2 nautical miles (3.7 km) south of the Owers Lightship (United Kingdom) by SM UB-30 (Imperial German Navy). Her crew survived.
Oilfield	United Kingdom	World War I: The tanker was torpedoed and damaged in the Atlantic Ocean off Cape Wrath, Sutherland (58°45′N 5°26′W) by SM U-90 (Imperial German Navy). She was beached at Stornoway, Orkney Islands but was declared a constructive total loss.
Quintero	Denmark	World War I: The three-masted barque was scuttled in the North Sea off Skagen (57°54′N 9°33′E) by SM UB-34 (Imperial German Navy). Her crew survived.
HMT Vulture II	Royal Navy	The naval trawler collided with another vessel and sank off Eriboll, Sutherland.

== 17 March ==
List of shipwrecks: 17 March 1918
Ship	State	Description
Anne Yvonne	France	World War I: The sailing vessel was shelled and sunk in the English Channel 1.5 nautical miles (2.8 km) off Cadgwith, Cornwall, United Kingdom (49°59′N 5°10′W) by SM UB-57 (Imperial German Navy).
Arvor	France	World War I: The sailing vessel was sunk in the English Channel 1.5 nautical miles (2.8 km) north east of The Lizard, Cornwall (49°59′N 5°10′W) by SM UB-57 (Imperial German Navy).
Beata	France	World War I: The sailing vessel was shelled and sunk in the English Channel 1.5 nautical miles (2.8 km) north east of The Lizard (49°59′N 5°10′W) by SM UB-57 (Imperial German Navy).
Cressida	United Kingdom	World War I: The steam yacht was torpedoed and sunk in the Irish Sea 16 nautical miles (30 km) west by north of The Skerries, Isle of Anglesey (53°23′N 5°05′W by SM U-103 (Imperial German Navy) with the loss of three crew.
Dunure	United Kingdom	The barque sprang a leak and foundered in the Mediterranean Sea 12 nautical miles (22 km) south of Isla Cristina, Spain. Her crew were rescued.
Eliza Anne	United Kingdom	World War I: The ketch was scuttled in the Atlantic Ocean 33 nautical miles (61 km) south by west of the Eddystone Lighthouse by SM UC-75 (Imperial German Navy). Her crew survived.
Guadalquivir	Spain	World War I: The cargo ship was sunk in the Atlantic Ocean (33°10′N 9°37′W) by SM U-154 (Imperial German Navy). Her crew survived.
Ivydene	United Kingdom	World War I: The cargo ship was torpedoed and sunk in the Mediterranean Sea 36 nautical miles (67 km) north of Cape Bougaroni, Algeria (38°49′N 6°32′E by SM UB-52 (Imperial German Navy) with the loss of a crew member.
Sea Gull	United Kingdom	World War I: The coaster was torpedoed and sunk in the Irish Sea 7 nautical miles (13 km) off Point Lynas, Anglesey by SM U-103 (Imperial German Navy) with the loss of twenty crew.
South Western	United Kingdom	World War I: The coaster was torpedoed and sunk in the English Channel 9 nautical miles (17 km) west by south of St. Catherine's Point, Isle of Wight by SM UB-59 (Imperial German Navy) with the loss of 24 of her crew.
Tripoli	Italy	World War I: The passenger ship was sunk in the Mediterranean Sea off Capo Figari, Sardinia (41°07′N 9°57′E) by SM UB-49 (Imperial German Navy).
Waihemo	United Kingdom	World War I: The cargo ship struck a mine and sank in the Aegean Sea off Piraeus. Her crew survived.

== 18 March ==
List of shipwrecks: 18 March 1918
Ship	State	Description
Atlantic Sun	United Kingdom	World War I: The tanker was torpedoed and sunk off Orsay, Inner Hebrides (55°49′N 7°10′W) by U-46 (Imperial German Navy) with the loss of two of her crew.
Baygitano	United Kingdom	World War I: The cargo ship was torpedoed and sunk in the English Channel off Lyme Regis, Dorset (50°41′N 2°56′W) by SM UC-77 (Imperial German Navy) with the loss of two of her crew.
Heian Maru No.18	Japan	The cargo ship caught fire and sank at Nagasaki. She was a total loss.
John H. Barry	United Kingdom	World War I: The cargo ship was torpedoed and sunk in the Mediterranean Sea 104 nautical miles (193 km) north north west of Cape Bougaroni, Algeria (38°42′N 5°45′E) by SM UB-52 (Imperial German Navy) with the loss of three crew.
Massilia	Italy	World War I: The coal hulk was torpedoed and sunk at Augusta, Sicily by SM UC-25 (Imperial German Navy).
Prometeo	Italy	World War I: The tanker was sunk in the Atlantic Ocean off Cape Carvoeiro, Portugal (37°54′N 16°00′W) by SM U-155 (Imperial German Navy).
Reidar	Norway	World War I: The cargo ship was sunk in the Atlantic Ocean 340 nautical miles (630 km) off the coast of Portugal by SM U-155 (Imperial German Navy) with the loss of four of her crew.
Saldanha	United Kingdom	World War I: The cargo ship was torpedoed and damaged in the Mediterranean Sea 95 nautical miles (176 km) north of Algiers, Algeria (38°19′N 2°39′E) by SM UB-52 (Imperial German Navy). She was torpedoed again the next day and sank with the loss of six crew.
Utrecht	French Navy	World War I: The naval tug was shelled and sunk in the Mediterranean Sea 90 nautical miles (170 km) east of Capo Figari, Sardinia, Italy (41°04′N 11°48′E) by SM UB-49 (Imperial German Navy) with the loss of two of her crew.

== 19 March ==
List of shipwrecks: 19 March 1918
Ship	State	Description
Burnstone	United Kingdom	World War I: The collier was torpedoed and sunk in the North Sea 44 nautical miles (81 km) north of the Farne Islands, Northumberland by SM UB-62 (Imperial German Navy) with the loss of five of her crew.
Giovanni Albanesi	Italy	World War I: The barque was shelled and sunk in the Gulf of Naples (40°25′N 13°17′E) by SM UB-49 (Imperial German Navy).
Linz	Austria-Hungary	World War I: The ocean liner sank in the Adriatic Sea on 19 March 1918 after she hit a mine.
San Francesco di Paolo	Italy	World War I: The sailing vessel was scuttled in the Gulf of Naples 70 nautical miles (130 km) west of Naples (40°40′N 13°48′E) by SM UB-49 (Imperial German Navy).
Luxor	United Kingdom	World War I: The cargo ship was torpedoed and sunk in the English Channel 27 nautical miles (50 km) west by south of St. Catherine's Point, Isle of Wight by SM UB-57 (Imperial German Navy). Her crew survived.

== 20 March ==
List of shipwrecks: 20 March 1918
Ship	State	Description
Antonios M. Theophilatos	Greece	World War I: The cargo ship was sunk in the Mediterranean Sea 75 nautical miles (139 km) north west of Port Said, Egypt (32°04′N 32°08′E) by SM U-33 (Imperial German Navy).
Azemmour	France	World War I: The coaster was torpedoed and sunk in the English Channel south of the Isle of Wight, United Kingdom (50°32′N 1°36′W) by SM UB-59 (Imperial German Navy).
Eros	Sweden	World War I: The coaster was torpedoed and sunk in the Atlantic Ocean 8 nautical miles (15 km) west of The Lizard, Cornwall, United Kingdom (49°56′N 5°25′W) by SM UB-103 (Imperial German Navy) with the loss of three of her crew.
Glenford	United Kingdom	World War I: The coaster was shelled and sunk in the Irish Sea 24 nautical miles (44 km) east of Rockabill, County Dublin (53°40′N 5°20′W) by SM U-101 (Imperial German Navy). Her crew survived.
Kassanga	United Kingdom	World War I: The cargo ship was torpedoed and sunk in the Irish Sea 23 nautical miles (43 km) south east by south of the South Arklow Lightship (United Kingdom) (52°27′N 5°26′W) by SM U-103 (Imperial German Navy). Her crew survived.
Matteo Renato Imbriani	Italy	World War I: The cargo ship struck a mine and sank in the Mediterranean Sea 6 nautical miles (11 km) south west of the Île du Planier, Bouches-du-Rhône, France by SM UC-67 (Imperial German Navy).
Saint Dimitrios	United Kingdom	World War I: The cargo ship was torpedoed and sunk in the Mediterranean Sea 50 nautical miles (93 km) north by east of Port Said by SM U-33 (Imperial German Navy). Her crew survived.
Samoset	United Kingdom	World War I: The tanker was torpedoed and sunk in the Mediterranean Sea 50 nautical miles (93 km) east north east of Port Said by SM U-33 (Imperial German Navy) with the loss of three crew.
Yochow	United Kingdom	World War I: The cargo ship was torpedoed and sunk in the Mediterranean Sea 54 nautical miles (100 km) north by east of Port Said by SM U-33 (Imperial German Navy) with the loss of 50 crew.

== 21 March ==
List of shipwrecks: 21 March 1918
Ship	State	Description
SMS A7	Imperial German Navy	World War I: The A1-class torpedo boat was shelled and sunk in the North Sea off Zeebrugge, West Flanders, Belgium by HMS Morris (Royal Navy) and/or Bouclier and Capitaine Mehl (both French Navy) with the loss of 23 of her crew.
SMS A10	Imperial German Navy	World War I: The destroyer was rammed and sunk in the North Sea off Zeebrugge by HMS Botha (Royal Navy).
Begonia	United Kingdom	World War I: The collier was torpedoed and sunk in the Atlantic Ocean 44 nautical miles (81 km) north of Wolf Rock, Cornwall (49°13′N 5°40′W) by SM UB-55 (Imperial German Navy). Her crew survived.
Dante C	Italy	World War I: The vessel was sunk in the Gulf of Naples by SM UB-49 (Imperial German Navy).
Ikeda	United Kingdom	World War I: The cargo ship was torpedoed and sunk in the English Channel 7 nautical miles (13 km) west of the Brighton Lightship (United Kingdom) by SM UB-40 (Imperial German Navy). Her crew survived.
Termini	Italy	World War I: The cargo ship was torpedoed and sunk in the Aegean Sea off Milos, Greece (36°49′N 24°21′E) by SM UC-37 (Imperial German Navy).
Tyrhaug	United Kingdom	World War I: The cargo ship was torpedoed and sunk in the Atlantic Ocean 10 nautical miles (19 km) north east of the Pendeen Lighthouse, Cornwall (50°19′N 5°36′W) by SM UB-103 (Imperial German Navy) with the loss of two of her crew.
William C. Moore	United States	The barge was damaged in a collision with USS Salem (United States Navy). She later sank at the wharf of Chappell Lumber Company, New London, Connecticut.

== 22 March ==
List of shipwrecks: 22 March 1918
Ship	State	Description
USS A-1	United States Navy	The Plunger-class submarine sank at New Suffolk, Massachusetts. Raised and sent to the Salvage Diving School at New London, Connecticut.
HMS Gaillardia	Royal Navy	World War I: The Aubrietia-class sloop struck a mine and sank in the North Sea.
HMT J. C. P.	Royal Navy	The naval trawler was lost on this date.
Polleon	United Kingdom	World War I: The cargo ship was torpedoed and sunk in the North Sea 3 nautical miles (5.6 km) east north east of the mouth of the River Tyne by SM UB-78 (Imperial German Navy) with the loss of four of her crew.
Saint Jean II	France	World War I: The cargo ship was sunk in the Mediterranean Sea 61 nautical miles (113 km) north west of Cape Bon, Algeria (37°56′N 10°49′E) by SM UB-50 (Imperial German Navy). Her crew survived.
S. Giuseppe C.	Italy	World War I: The sailing vessel was sunk in the Mediterranean Sea south of Sardinia by SM UC-67 (Imperial German Navy).
Trinidad	United Kingdom	World War I: The cargo ship was torpedoed and sunk in the Irish Sea 12 nautical miles (22 km) east of the Codling Bank Lightship (United Kingdom) by SM U-101 (Imperial German Navy) with the loss of 39 crew.

== 23 March ==
List of shipwrecks: 23 March 1918
Ship	State	Description
HMS Arno	Royal Navy	The destroyer collided with HMS Hope (Royal Navy) in the Dardanelles (40°14′30″N 26°30′30″E) and sank.
Aulton	United Kingdom	World War I: The coaster was torpedoed and sunk in the North Sea 9 nautical miles (17 km) southeast by east of Berwick-upon-Tweed, Northumberland by SM UB-83 (Imperial German Navy) with the loss of two of her crew.
Chattahoochee	United States	World War I: The cargo ship was torpedoed and sunk in the English Channel 28 nautical miles (52 km) south of Penzance, Cornwall, United Kingdom (49°39′N 5°23′W) by SM UB-55 (Imperial German Navy). Her crew survived.
Etonian	United Kingdom	World War I: The passenger ship was torpedoed and sunk in the Atlantic Ocean 34 nautical miles (63 km) south by east of the Old Head of Kinsale, County Cork by SM U-61 (Imperial German Navy) with the loss of seven crew.
Jane Grey	United Kingdom	World War I: The schooner was shelled and sunk in the Irish Sea 14 nautical miles (26 km) north west by west of the Smalls Lighthouse by SM U-101 (Imperial German Navy). Her crew survived.
SMS M36	Imperial German Navy	World War I: The Type 1915 minesweeper struck a mine and sank in the North Sea.
Madame Midas	United Kingdom	World War I: The cargo ship was torpedoed and sunk in the Atlantic Ocean 38 nautical miles (70 km) west south west of The Lizard, Cornwall (49°27′N 5°28′W) by SM UB-55 (Imperial German Navy). Her crew survived.
Mar Baltico	Spain	World War I: The cargo ship was sunk in the English Channel (49°17′N 5°05′W) by SM UB-55 (Imperial German Navy).
HMT New Dawn	Royal Navy	World War I: The naval trawler struck a mine and sank in the English Channel off The Needles, Isle of Wight with the loss of three of her crew.
Venborg	Norway	World War I: The cargo ship was sunk in the Atlantic Ocean 25 nautical miles (46 km) north of Ouessant, Finistère, France (48°55′N 5°02′W) by SM UB-55 (Imperial German Navy). Her crew survived.

== 24 March ==
List of shipwrecks: 24 March 1918
Ship	State	Description
Anteros	United Kingdom	World War I: The cargo ship was torpedoed and sunk in the Irish Sea 16 nautical miles (30 km) west by north of South Stack (53°17′N 5°09′W) by SM UB-103 (Imperial German Navy) with the loss of two of her crew.
Avala	Italy	World War I: The cargo ship was shelled and sunk in the Atlantic Ocean 320 nautical miles (590 km) west of Madeira, Portugal (38°32′N 17°58′W) by SM U-155 (Imperial German Navy).
Fileur	France	World War I: The sailing vessel was sunk in the Atlantic Ocean 40 nautical miles (74 km) north west of the Île de Batz, Finistère by SM UB-55 (Imperial German Navy).
John G. Walter	United Kingdom	World War I: The schooner was shelled and sunk in the Irish Sea 20 nautical miles (37 km) south west of the Smalls Lighthouse by SM U-101 (Imperial German Navy). Her crew survived.
Jorgina	United Kingdom	World War I: The schooner was shelled and sunk in the Atlantic Ocean 360 nautical miles (670 km) north by west of Madeira (38°40′N 18°14′W) by SM U-155 (Imperial German Navy). Her crew survived.
La Nuova Felice	Italy	World War I: The sailing vessel was sunk in the Strait of Sicily by SM UC-53 (Imperial German Navy).
Nuovo Genio	Italy	World War I: The sailing vessel was sunk in the Strait of Sicily by SM UC-53 (Imperial German Navy).
O. B. Jennings	United States	The tanker collided with War Knight (United Kingdom) in the English Channel off the Needles Lighthouse, Isle of Wight. She was towed into Sandown Bay where she continued to burn for ten days. The tanker was then torpedoed and sunk by friendly fire. O. B. Jennings was raised, repaired and returned to service. The collision created a massive inferno killed everyone on board.
Partenope	Regia Marina	World War I: The Partenope-class minelayer was sunk in the Mediterranean Sea off Bizerta, Algeria (37°53′N 10°10′E) by SM UC-67 (Imperial German Navy). Her crew survived.
Regina Immacolata	Italy	World War I: The sailing vessel was sunk in the Strait of Sicily by SM UC-53 (Imperial German Navy).
Tre Sorrelle Salvo	Italy	World War I: The sailing vessel was sunk in the Strait of Sicily by SM UC-53 (Imperial German Navy).
War Knight	United Kingdom	World War I: The cargo ship collided with O. B. Jennings (United States) in the English Channel off the Needles Lighthouse, Isle of Wight. War Knight then struck a mine and was beached at Freshwater, Isle of Wight, a total loss. The collision created a massive inferno killed all 32 on board.

== 25 March ==
List of shipwrecks: 25 March 1918
Ship	State	Description
HMT Border Lads	Royal Navy	World War I: The naval trawler was torpedoed and sunk in the North Sea 2 nautical miles (3.7 km) off the mouth of the River Tyne by SM UB-78 (Imperial German Navy) with the loss of four of her crew.
Carlo Splendor	Italy	World War I: The sailing vessel was sunk in the Strait of Messina by SM UB-49 (Imperial German Navy).
Destro	United Kingdom	World War I: The coaster was torpedoed and sunk in the Irish Sea 5 nautical miles (9.3 km) south west of the Mull of Galloway, Wigtownshire (54°34′N 4°45′W) by SM U-96 (Imperial German Navy) with the loss of six of her crew.
Francesco Antonio Aiello	Italy	World War I: The sailing vessel was sunk in the Strait of Sicily by SM UC-67 (Imperial German Navy).
Hercules	United Kingdom	World War I: The cargo ship was torpedoed and sunk in the North Sea 4 nautical miles (7.4 km) north north west of Flamborough Head, Yorkshire by SM UB-21 (Imperial German Navy) with the loss of a crew member.
L'Iniziatore	Italy	World War I: The sailing vessel was sunk in the Strait of Sicily (37°30′N 11°45′W) by SM UC-67 (Imperial German Navy).
Rio Ave	Portugal	World War I: The schooner was shelled and sunk in the Atlantic Ocean 100 nautical miles (190 km) off Madeira (38°33′N 18°08′W) by SM U-155 (Imperial German Navy).
Tokitsukaze	Imperial Japanese Navy	The destroyer ran aground in heavy rain and broke in half near Aoshima Island in Miyazaki Prefecture, Kyūshū, Japan. Her machinery and weapons were salvaged and she later returned to service with a new hull.

== 26 March ==
List of shipwrecks: 26 March 1918
Ship	State	Description
USS Admiral	United States Navy	The Naval Yacht struck a rock and sank off Plymouth, Massachusetts. Raised, repaired and returned to service.
Elisabetha	Italy	World War I: The sailing vessel was sunk in the Strait of Sicily by SM UC-67 (Imperial German Navy).
RFA Lady Cory-Wright	Royal Navy	World War I: The mine carrier was torpedoed and sunk in the English Channel 14 nautical miles (26 km) off The Lizard, Cornwall by SM UC-17 (Imperial German Navy) with the loss of 39 of her 40 crew.
SM U-61	Imperial German Navy	World War I: The Type U 57 submarine was sunk in the Atlantic Ocean by USS PC-51 (United States Navy) with the loss of all 36 crew.
Volturno	Italy	World War I: The bulk carrier was sunk in the Mediterranean Sea off Bône, Algeria (37°27′N 8°07′E) by SM UB-50 (Imperial German Navy).

== 27 March ==
List of shipwrecks: 27 March 1918
Ship	State	Description
Allendale	United Kingdom	World War I: The cargo ship was torpedoed and sunk in the Atlantic Ocean 52 nautical miles (96 km) south by west of The Lizard, Cornwall (49°50′N 5°50′W) by SM U-101 (Imperial German Navy with the loss of a crew member.
Beira	Portugal	World War I: The sailing vessel was sunk in the Atlantic Ocean (34°10′N 14°35′W) by SM U-154 (Imperial German Navy). Her crew survived.
Carlo P.	Italy	World War I: The sailing vessel was sunk in the Mediterranean Sea 30 nautical miles (56 km) north of the Galite Islands, Tunisia by SM UC-54 (Imperial German Navy).
Castrenzo Coppola	Italy	World War I: The sailing vessel was sunk in the Tyrrhenian Sea off Naples by SM UC-53 (Imperial German Navy).
HMS Kale	Royal Navy	World War I: The E-class destroyer struck a naval mine and sank in the North Sea.
MB 3, MB 8 and MB 9	Ottoman Navy	The MB 1-class motor gunboats were lost on this date.
Watauga	United Kingdom	World War I: The schooner was shelled and sunk in the Atlantic Ocean 450 nautical miles (830 km) west by north of Lisbon, Portugal (38°54′N 18°24′W) by SM U-155 (Imperial German Navy) with the loss of five crew.

== 28 March ==
List of shipwrecks: 28 March 1918
Ship	State	Description
SMS Amrumbank	Imperial German Navy	World War I: The Gronland-class Vorpostenboot was sunk by mines off Cape Tachkuna, Estonia.
Botha	United Kingdom	World War I: The trawler was scuttled in the North Sea 3 nautical miles (5.6 km) east of Whitby, Yorkshire by SM UC-64 (Imperial German Navy).
Brotherly Love	United Kingdom	World War I: The trawler was shelled and sunk in the North Sea 6 nautical miles (11 km) east north east of Whitby by SM UC-64 (Imperial German Navy).
City of Winchester	United Kingdom	World War I: The ketch was shelled and sunk in the English Channel 10 nautical miles (19 km) north west by west of the Les Hanois Lighthouse, Guernsey, Channel Islands (49°28′N 2°55′W) by SM U-90 (Imperial German Navy). Her crew survived.
Grampus	United Kingdom	The dredger foundered on this date.
Honora	United Kingdom	World War I: The fishing vessel was shelled and sunk in the North Sea 6 nautical miles (11 km) east north east of Whitby by SM UC-64 (Imperial German Navy).
Inkosi	United Kingdom	World War I: The cargo ship was torpedoed and sunk in the Irish Sea 10 nautical miles (19 km) south west of Burrow Head, Wigtownshire by SM U-96 (Imperial German Navy) with the loss of three crew.
Noel	United Kingdom	World War I: The fishing vessel was shelled and sunk in the North Sea 6 nautical miles (11 km) east north east of Whitby by SM UC-64 (Imperial German Navy).
SMS Polarstern	Imperial German Navy	The Vorpostenboot was lost on this date.
SMS Scharbeutz	Imperial German Navy	World War I: The Anneliese-class Vorpostenboot was sunk as a blockship.
HMS Tithonus	Royal Navy	World War I: The armed boarding steamer was sunk in the North Sea 50 nautical miles (93 km) east of Aberdeen (57°04′N 0°33′W) by SM UB-72 (Imperial German Navy) with the loss of four of her crew.

== 29 March ==
List of shipwrecks: 29 March 1918
Ship	State	Description
SMS F32	Imperial German Navy	The F Type minesweeping boat was lost on this date.
Porto Santo	Portugal	The cargo ship foundered in the Aegean Sea off Antimilos, Greece, possibly after striking a mine. Her crew survived.
HMT Swallow	Royal Navy	The 133.7-foot (40.8 m), 243-ton steam minesweeping naval trawler was sunk in a collision with Audax (Norway) 5 miles (8.0 km) south east of Whitby.
T. R. Thompson	United Kingdom	World War I: The cargo ship was torpedoed and sunk in the English Channel 7 nautical miles (13 km) south of Newhaven, Sussex by SM UB-57 (Imperial German Navy) with the loss of 33 of her crew.

== 30 March ==
List of shipwrecks: 30 March 1918
Ship	State	Description
SMS G87	Imperial German Navy	World War I: The G85-class torpedo boat struck a mine and sank in the North Sea with the loss of 43 of her crew.
SMS G93	Imperial German Navy	World War I: The G85-class torpedo boat struck a mine and sank in the North Sea with the loss of ten of her crew.
SMS G94	Imperial German Navy	World War I: The G85-class torpedo boat struck a mine and sank in the North Sea.
Geraldine	United Kingdom	World War I: The fishing smack was shelled and sunk in the Irish Sea 10 nautical miles (19 km) east of Lambay Island, County Dublin by SM U-96 (Imperial German Navy) with the loss of all five of her crew.
Lough Fisher	United Kingdom	World War I: The coaster was sunk in the Atlantic Ocean 12 nautical miles (22 km) south south east of Helvick Head, County Waterford by SM U-101 (Imperial German Navy) with the loss of thirteen crew.
Salaminia	Greece	World War I: The cargo ship was shelled and sunk in the Irish Sea 13 nautical miles (24 km) south south east of Rockabill (53°27′N 5°32′W) by SM UB-64 (Imperial German Navy). There were a number of casualties.
Stabil	Norway	World War I: The coaster was torpedoed and sunk in the Atlantic Ocean off the Pendeen Lighthouse, Cornwall, United Kingdom (50°19′N 5°36′W) by SM U-46 (Imperial German Navy) with the loss of nine crew.
St. Michan	United Kingdom	World War I: The fishing vessel was shelled and sunk in the Irish Sea 10 nautical miles (19 km) east of Lambay Island by SM U-96 (Imperial German Navy). Her crew survived.
Vafos	Norway	World War I: The cargo ship was sunk in the North Sea 35 nautical miles (65 km) south west by west of the Marstenen Lighthouse by SM UB-72 (Imperial German Navy) with the loss of four of her crew.

== 31 March ==
List of shipwrecks: 31 March 1918
Ship	State	Description
Celtic	United Kingdom	World War I: The ocean liner was torpedoed and damaged in the Irish Sea 11 nautical miles (20 km) south of the Isle of Man by SM UB-77 (Imperial German Navy) with the loss of six lives. She was beached but was later refloated, repaired and returned to service.
Conargo	United Kingdom	World War I: The cargo ship was torpedoed and damaged in the Irish Sea 12 nautical miles (22 km)) west by north of the Calf of Man, Isle of Man (54°02′N 5°11′W) by SM U-96 (Imperial German Navy). She was torpedoed again the next day and sunk with the loss of nine of her crew (53°33′N 4°50′W).
Excellence Pleske	United Kingdom	World War I: The cargo ship was torpedoed and sunk in the English Channel 2.5 nautical miles (4.6 km) south south east of Dungeness, Kent by SM UB-57 (Imperial German Navy) with the loss of thirteen of her crew.
Immacolata	Italy	World War I: The sailing vessel was sunk in the Tyrrhenian Sea off Bari Sardo, Sardinia by SM UC-35 (Imperial German Navy).
Indien	Denmark	World War I: The cargo ship was sunk in the Atlantic Ocean (40°40′N 28°15′W) by SM U-152 (Imperial German Navy) with the loss of 29 crew.
La Loire	France	World War I: The cargo ship was sunk in the Mediterranean Sea north east of Alexandria, Egypt by SM U-33 (Imperial German Navy).
San Nicola	United Kingdom	World War I: The sailing vessel was shelled and sunk in the Mediterranean Sea 18 nautical miles (33 km) east north east of Valletta, Malta by SM UC-52 (Imperial German Navy).
Slieve Bloom	United Kingdom	The ferry collided with the destroyer USS Stockton (United States Navy) and sank with the loss of one life.
Vianna	United Kingdom	World War I: The coaster was torpedoed and sunk in the North Sea 4 nautical miles (7.4 km) east of Seaham Harbour, County Durham (54°50′N 1°12′W) by SM UC-64 (Imperial German Navy) with the loss of four of her crew.

== Unknown date ==
List of shipwrecks: Unknown date 1918
Ship	State	Description
Alose	French Navy	The submarine was sunk as a target in the Mediterranean Sea off Fréjus, France.
Angelo Raffaele	Italy	World War I: The vessel was sunk in the Gulf of Naples between 19 and 21 March by SM UB-49 (Imperial German Navy).
Avé Maria	France	The schooner sprang a leak and foundered in early March. Her crew were rescued.
Cecil L. Shave	United Kingdom	World War I: The sailing vessel was sunk in the Atlantic Ocean off the Azores, Portugal by a Kaiserliche Marine submarine.
USS Cyclops	United States Navy	The Proteus-class collier foundered in the Bermuda Triangle some time after 4 March with the loss of all 306 passengers and crew.
Lottie A. Silver	United Kingdom	The schooner foundered in the Atlantic Ocean in early March.
