= E35 =

E35 may refer to:

== Roads ==
- European route E35
- Guthrie Corridor Expressway, route E35 in Malaysia
- Nishi-Kyūshū Expressway, route E35 in Japan
- Ecuador Highway 35, signposted as E-35.

== Vehicles ==
- HMS E35, a British E class submarine built in 1916
- VinFast VF e35, a 2022–present Vietnamese compact electric SUV
