= UC-67 =

UC-67 may refer to:

- SM UC-67, a World War I German coastal minelaying submarine
- B-23 Dragon, an airplane with a United States military designation of "UC-67"
