= SM U-101 =

History

German Empire
- Name: U-101
- Ordered: 15 September 1915
- Builder: AG Weser, Bremen
- Yard number: 252
- Laid down: 30 November 1915
- Launched: 1 April 1917
- Commissioned: 15 May 1917
- Fate: Surrendered 21 November 1918

General characteristics
- Class & type: German Type U 57 submarine
- Displacement: 750 t (740 long tons) surfaced; 952 t (937 long tons) submerged
- Length: 67.60 m (221 ft 9 in) (o/a); 54.02 m (177 ft 3 in) (pressure hull)
- Beam: 6.32 m (20 ft 9 in) (o/a); 4.05 m (13 ft 3 in) (pressure hull)
- Height: 8.25 m (27 ft 1 in)
- Draught: 3.65 m (12 ft)
- Installed power: 2 × 2,400 PS (1,765 kW; 2,367 shp) surfaced; 2 × 1,200 PS (883 kW; 1,184 shp) submerged
- Propulsion: 2 shafts, 2 × 1.65 m (5 ft 5 in) propellers
- Speed: 16.5 knots (30.6 km/h; 19.0 mph) surfaced; 8.8 knots (16.3 km/h; 10.1 mph) submerged
- Range: 10,100 nmi (18,700 km; 11,600 mi) at 8 knots (15 km/h; 9.2 mph) surfaced; 56 nmi (104 km; 64 mi) at 5 knots (9.3 km/h; 5.8 mph) submerged
- Test depth: 50 m (164 ft 1 in)
- Complement: 4 officers, 32 enlisted
- Armament: 4 × 50 cm (19.7 in) torpedo tubes (two bow, two stern); 10–12 torpedoes; 2 × 8.8 cm (3.5 in) SK L/30 deck gun

Service record
- Part of: II Flotilla; 10 July 1917 – 11 November 1918
- Commanders: Kptlt. Karl Koopmann; 15 May 1917 – 19 December 1917; Kptlt. Carl-Siegfried Ritter von Georg; 20 December 1917 – 17 June 1918; Kptlt. Friedrich Ulrich; 18 June 1918 – 11 November 1918
- Operations: 8 patrols
- Victories: 22 merchant ships sunk (26,045 GRT); 1 auxiliary warship sunk (208 GRT); 3 merchant ships damaged (11,217 GRT)

SM U-101 was one of the 329 submarines serving in the Imperial German Navy in World War I. U-101 was engaged in the German campaign against Allied commerce (Handelskrieg) during that conflict. On 26 November 1917, U-101 torpedoed and damaged RFA Crenella, which managed to return to port with assistance from USS Cushing.

== Summary of raiding history ==
Date	Name	Nationality	Tonnage (Note: Merchant ship tonnages are in gross register tons. Military vessels are listed by tons displacement.)	Fate
6 August 1917	Rosemount	United Kingdom	3,044	Sunk
26 September 1917	Jacqueline	France	2,899	Sunk
9 October 1917	Nervier	Belgium	1,759	Sunk
26 November 1917	RFA Crenella	Royal Navy	7,035	Damaged
27 November 1917	Notre Dame De Rostrenen	France	186	Sunk
19 January 1918	St. Clair	United Kingdom	621	Damaged
1 February 1918	Kindly Light	United Kingdom	116	Sunk
2 February 1918	Marie Magdeleine	France	115	Sunk
2 February 1918	Sofie	United Kingdom	354	Sunk
3 February 1918	Nikolaos	Kingdom of Italy	3,561	Damaged
5 February 1918	Mexico City	United Kingdom	5,078	Sunk
20 March 1918	Glenford	United Kingdom	494	Sunk
22 March 1918	Trinidad	United Kingdom	2,592	Sunk
23 March 1918	Jane Gray	United Kingdom	124	Sunk
24 March 1918	John G. Walter	United Kingdom	258	Sunk
27 March 1918	Allendale	United Kingdom	2,153	Sunk
30 March 1918	Lough Fisher	United Kingdom	418	Sunk
2 April 1918	Solway Queen	United Kingdom	307	Sunk
14 May 1918	Embla	Denmark	157	Sunk
26 May 1918	Princess Royal	United Kingdom	1,986	Sunk
27 May 1918	Molière	France	1,545	Sunk
28 May 1918	Flora	France	209	Sunk
29 May 1918	Souvenir	Denmark	549	Sunk
30 May 1918	Waneta	United Kingdom	1,683	Sunk
31 May 1918	Pretty Polly	United Kingdom	19	Sunk
3 June 1918	HMT St. John's	Royal Navy	208	Sunk

== Bibliography ==
- Gröner, Erich; Jung, Dieter; Maass, Martin (1991). U-boats and Mine Warfare Vessels. German Warships 1815–1945. Vol. 2. Translated by Thomas, Keith; Magowan, Rachel. London: Conway Maritime Press. ISBN 0-85177-593-4.
