= HMS Ophelia =

Destroyer of the Royal Navy

History

United Kingdom
- Name: HMS Ophelia
- Namesake: Ophelia
- Builder: William Doxford & Sons
- Launched: 13 October 1915
- Fate: Sold to the Slough Trading Company, 11 November 1921

General characteristics
- Class & type: Admiralty M-class destroyer
- Displacement: 971 long tons (987 t)
- Length: 273 ft 4 in (83.31 m) o/a
- Beam: 26 ft 8 in (8.13 m)
- Draught: 9 ft 8 in (2.95 m)
- Installed power: 25,000 shp (19,000 kW); 4 × Yarrow boilers
- Propulsion: 3 Shafts; 3 steam turbines
- Speed: 34 knots (63 km/h; 39 mph)
- Range: 2,100 nmi (3,900 km; 2,400 mi) at 15 knots (28 km/h; 17 mph)
- Complement: 76
- Armament: 3 × QF 4-inch (102 mm) Mark IV guns; 2 × QF 1.5-pounder (37 mm) or QF 2-pounder (40 mm) "pom-pom" anti-aircraft guns; 2 × twin 21-inch (533 mm) torpedo tubes

HMS Ophelia was an Admiralty M-class destroyer built for the Royal Navy during the First World War, entering service in 1916. The ship served at the Battle of Jutland on 31 May/1 June 1916, and sank a German submarine in 1918. She was sold for scrap in 1921.

== Description ==
The Admiralty M class were improved and faster versions of the preceding Laforey-class destroyers. They displaced 971 long tons (987 t). The ships had an overall length of 273 feet 4 inches (83.3 m), a beam of 26 feet 8 inches (8.1 m) and a draught of 9 feet 8 inches (2.9 m). They were powered by three Parsons direct-drive steam turbines, each driving one propeller shaft, using steam provided by four Yarrow boilers. The turbines developed a total of 25,000 shaft horsepower (19,000 kW) and gave a maximum speed of 34 knots (63 km/h; 39 mph). The ships carried a maximum of 237 long tons (241 t) of fuel oil that gave them a range of 2,100 nautical miles (3,900 km; 2,400 mi) at 15 knots (28 km/h; 17 mph). The ships' complement was 76 officers and ratings.

The ships were armed with three single QF 4-inch (102 mm) Mark IV guns and two QF 1.5-pounder (37 mm) anti-aircraft guns. These latter guns were later replaced by a pair of QF 2-pounder (40 mm) "pom-pom" anti-aircraft guns. The ships were also fitted with two above water twin mounts for 21-inch (533 mm) torpedoes.

== Construction and service ==
Ophelia was ordered under the Third War Programme in November 1914 and laid down on 1 February 1915 by William Doxford & Sons at their shipyard in Sunderland. The ship was launched on 13 October and completed in May 1916.

Ophelia was attached to the 4th Destroyer Flotilla, part of the Grand Fleet during the Battle of Jutland on 31 May/1 June 1916. Ophelia was one of four destroyers of the 4th Flotilla (the others were Shark, Acasta and Christopher) that formed a screen for the 3rd Battlecruiser Squadron. The four destroyers engaged German ships which were carrying out a torpedo attack on the 3rd Battlecruiser Squadron. Ophelia fired one torpedo that missed its target, but was undamaged.

After Jutland, Ophelia joined the newly established 14th Destroyer Flotilla, also part of the Grand Fleet. On 10 September 1918, Ophelia was on patrol, with a Kite balloon deployed, when the observer in the balloon spotted the conning tower of a submarine. The submarine dived, but Ophelia dropped depth charges on the site of the submarine's submergence, which were rewarded by a large underwater explosion and a large oil slick. Ophelia had sunk the German submarine UB-83.

By the end of the war, Ophelia had transferred to the 3rd Destroyer Flotilla. She was sold for breaking up to the Slough Trading Company on 11 November 1921.

== Pennant numbers ==
Pennant number	Date
G03	May 1916
G57	January 1917
G58	January 1918
GA9	November 1918

== Bibliography ==
- Campbell, John (1998). Jutland: An Analysis of the Fighting. London: Conway Maritime Press. ISBN 0-85177-750-3.
- Colledge, J. J.; Warlow, Ben (2006) [1969]. Ships of the Royal Navy: The Complete Record of All Fighting Ships of the Royal Navy from the 15th Century to the Present (3rd Rev ed.). London: Chatham Publishing. ISBN 978-1-86176-281-8. OCLC 67375475.
- Dittmar, F.J. & Colledge, J.J. (1972). British Warships 1914–1919. Shepperton, UK: Ian Allan. ISBN 0-7110-0380-7.
- Friedman, Norman (2009). British Destroyers: From Earliest Days to the Second World War. Barnsley, UK: Seaforth Publishing. ISBN 978-1-84832-049-9.
- Gardiner, Robert & Gray, Randal (1985). Conway's All The World's Fighting Ships 1906–1921. London: Conway Maritime Press. ISBN 0-85177-245-5.
- Grant, Robert M. (1964). U-Boats Destroyed: The Effects of Anti-Submarine Warfare 1914–1918. London: Putnam. OCLC 878496783.
- Jellicoe, John (1920). Battle of Jutland: 30th May to 1st June 1916: Official Despatches with Appendices. London: His Majesty's Stationery Office.
- March, Edgar J. (1966). British Destroyers: A History of Development, 1892–1953; Drawn by Admiralty Permission From Official Records & Returns, Ships' Covers & Building Plans. London: Seeley Service. OCLC 164893555.
