= SM UC-64 =

1916 German type UC II minelaying U-boat

History

German Empire
- Name: UC-64
- Ordered: 12 January 1916
- Builder: AG Weser, Bremen
- Yard number: 262
- Laid down: 3 April 1916
- Launched: 23 January 1917
- Commissioned: 22 February 1917
- Fate: Sunk by mine, 20 June 1918

General characteristics
- Class & type: Type UC II submarine
- Displacement: 422 t (415 long tons), surfaced; 504 t (496 long tons), submerged
- Length: 51.85 m (170 ft 1 in) o/a; 40.40 m (132 ft 7 in) pressure hull
- Beam: 5.22 m (17 ft 2 in) o/a; 3.65 m (12 ft) pressure hull
- Draught: 3.67 m (12 ft 0 in)
- Propulsion: 2 × propeller shafts; 2 × 6-cylinder, 4-stroke diesel engines, 600 PS (440 kW; 590 shp); 2 × electric motors, 620 PS (460 kW; 610 shp)
- Speed: 11.9 knots (22.0 km/h; 13.7 mph), surfaced; 7.2 knots (13.3 km/h; 8.3 mph), submerged
- Range: 8,000 nmi (15,000 km; 9,200 mi) at 7 knots (13 km/h; 8.1 mph) surfaced; 59 nmi (109 km; 68 mi) at 4 knots (7.4 km/h; 4.6 mph) submerged
- Test depth: 50 m (160 ft)
- Complement: 26
- Armament: 6 × 100 cm (39.4 in) mine tubes; 18 × UC 200 mines; 3 × 50 cm (19.7 in) torpedo tubes (2 bow/external; one stern); 7 × torpedoes; 1 × 8.8 cm (3.5 in) Uk L/30 deck gun
- Notes: 30-second diving time

Service record
- Part of: Flandern / Flandern II Flotilla; 13 May 1917 – 20 June 1918
- Commanders: Oblt.z.S. Ernst Müller-Schwarz; 22 February – 12 September 1917; Oblt.z.S. Erich Hecht; 13 September 1917 – 22 February 1918; Oblt.z.S. Ferdinand Schwartz; 23 February – 20 June 1918
- Operations: 15 patrols
- Victories: 26 merchant ships sunk (20,473 GRT); 4 merchant ships damaged (14,012 GRT)

SM UC-64 was a German Type UC II minelaying submarine or U-boat in the German Imperial Navy (German: Kaiserliche Marine) during World War I. The U-boat was ordered on 12 January 1916, laid down on 3 April 1916, and was launched on 23 January 1917. She was commissioned into the German Imperial Navy on 22 February 1917 as SM UC-64. (Note: "SM" stands for "Seiner Majestät" (English: His Majesty's) and combined with the U for Unterseeboot would be translated as His Majesty's Submarine.) In 15 patrols UC-64 was credited with sinking 26 ships, either by torpedo or by mines laid. UC-64 was mined and sunk in the Dover Strait on 20 June 1918.

== Design ==
A Type UC II submarine, UC-64 had a displacement of 422 tonnes (415 long tons) when at the surface and 504 tonnes (496 long tons) while submerged. She had a length overall of 51.85 m (170 ft 1 in), a beam of 5.22 m (17 ft 2 in), and a draught of 3.67 m (12 ft 0 in). The submarine was powered by two six-cylinder four-stroke diesel engines each producing 300 metric horsepower (220 kW; 300 shp) (a total of 600 metric horsepower (440 kW; 590 shp)), two electric motors producing 620 metric horsepower (460 kW; 610 shp), and two propeller shafts. She had a dive time of 48 seconds and was capable of operating at a depth of 50 metres (160 ft).

The submarine had a maximum surface speed of 11.9 knots (22.0 km/h; 13.7 mph) and a submerged speed of 7.2 knots (13.3 km/h; 8.3 mph). When submerged, she could operate for 59 nautical miles (109 km; 68 mi) at 4 knots (7.4 km/h; 4.6 mph); when surfaced, she could travel 8,000 nautical miles (15,000 km; 9,200 mi) at 7 knots (13 km/h; 8.1 mph). UC-64 was fitted with six 100 centimetres (39 in) mine tubes, eighteen UC 200 mines, three 50 centimetres (20 in) torpedo tubes (one on the stern and two on the bow), seven torpedoes, and one 8.8 cm (3.5 in) Uk L/30 deck gun. Her complement was twenty-six crew members.

== Summary of raiding history ==
Date	Name	Nationality	Tonnage (Note: Merchant ship tonnages are in gross register tons. Military vessels are listed by tons displacement.)	Fate
20 May 1917	Voorwaarts	Netherlands	114	Sunk
23 May 1917	Alberdina	Netherlands	100	Sunk
21 June 1917	Hendrika	Netherlands	109	Sunk
24 June 1917	Telegraaf XVIII	Netherlands	306	Sunk
16 July 1917	Timor	Netherlands	135	Sunk
17 August 1917	Esperance	France	97	Sunk
16 September 1917	Eendracht VII	Netherlands	251	Sunk
17 September 1917	Paraciers	France	2,542	Sunk
22 September 1917	Ville De Valenciennes	France	1,734	Sunk
18 October 1917	Altair	Norway	1,674	Sunk
18 October 1917	Sten	United Kingdom	928	Sunk
16 November 1917	Jules Verne	France	157	Sunk
27 November 1917	Ville De Thann	France	1,416	Sunk
4 December 1917	Manchester Mariner	United Kingdom	4,106	Damaged
14 December 1917	Volnay	United Kingdom	4,610	Sunk
19 December 1917	Borgsten	Norway	1,718	Sunk
19 December 1917	Trevelyan	United Kingdom	3,066	Damaged
23 December 1917	Manicia	Norway	1,868	Damaged
20 January 1918	Queen Margaret	United Kingdom	4,972	Damaged
26 January 1918	May	United Kingdom	24	Sunk
26 January 1918	Rob Roy	United Kingdom	112	Sunk
28 March 1918	Botha	United Kingdom	17	Sunk
28 March 1918	Brotherly Love	United Kingdom	19	Sunk
28 March 1918	Honora	United Kingdom	29	Sunk
28 March 1918	Noel	United Kingdom	21	Sunk
31 March 1918	Vianna	Royal Navy	401	Sunk
23 April 1918	Laurium	United Kingdom	582	Sunk
25 April 1918	Sote	Sweden	1,353	Sunk
26 April 1918	Llwyngwair	United Kingdom	1,304	Sunk
23 May 1918	Mefjord	Norway	720	Sunk
