= SM UB-59 =

1916–1918 German submarine

- UB-148 at sea, a U-boat similar to UB-59.

History

German Empire
- Name: UB-59
- Ordered: 20 May 1916
- Builder: AG Weser, Bremen
- Cost: 3,276,000 German Papiermark
- Yard number: 271
- Laid down: 13 September 1916
- Launched: 21 July 1917
- Commissioned: 25 August 1917
- Fate: Scuttled 5 October 1918 off Zeebrugge at 51°19′N 03°12′E

General characteristics
- Class & type: Type UB III submarine
- Displacement: 516 t (508 long tons) surfaced; 646 t (636 long tons) submerged
- Length: 55.85 m (183 ft 3 in) (o/a)
- Beam: 5.80 m (19 ft)
- Draught: 3.72 m (12 ft 2 in)
- Propulsion: 2 × propeller shaft; 2 × Körting four-stroke 6-cylinder diesel engines, 1,050 bhp (780 kW); 2 × Siemens-Schuckert electric motors, 780 shp (580 kW)
- Speed: 13.4 knots (24.8 km/h; 15.4 mph) surfaced; 7.8 knots (14.4 km/h; 9.0 mph) submerged
- Range: 9,020 nmi (16,710 km; 10,380 mi) at 6 knots (11 km/h; 6.9 mph) surfaced; 55 nmi (102 km; 63 mi) at 4 knots (7.4 km/h; 4.6 mph) submerged
- Test depth: 50 m (160 ft)
- Complement: 3 officers, 31 men
- Armament: 5 × 50 cm (19.7 in) torpedo tubes (4 bow, 1 stern); 10 torpedoes; 1 × 8.8 cm (3.46 in) deck gun

Service record
- Part of: Flandern I Flotilla; 5 November 1917 – 2 October 1918
- Commanders: Oblt.z.S. Peter Ernst Eiffe; 10 August 1917 – February 1918; Kptlt. Erwin Waßner; 25 August 1917 – 5 May 1918
- Operations: 5 patrols
- Victories: 7 merchant ships sunk (8,361 GRT); 2 merchant ships damaged (12,413 GRT)

SM UB-59 was a German Type UB III submarine or U-boat in the German Imperial Navy (German: Kaiserliche Marine) during World War I. She was commissioned into the Flanders Flotilla of the German Imperial Navy on 25 August 1917 as SM UB-59. (Note: "SM" stands for "Seiner Majestät" (English: His Majesty's) and combined with the U for Unterseeboot would be translated as His Majesty's Submarine.)

She operated as part of the Flanders Flotilla based in Zeebrugge. UB-59 scuttled 5 October 1918 off Zeebrugge at 51°19′N 03°12′E during the evacuation of Belgium by German forces.

== Construction ==
She was built by AG Weser, Bremen and following just under a year of construction, launched at Bremen on 21 July 1917. UB-59 was commissioned later that same year. Like all Type UB III submarines, UB-59 carried 10 torpedoes and was armed with a 8.8 cm (3.46 in) deck gun. UB-59 would carry a crew of up to 3 officer and 31 men and had a cruising range of 9,020 nautical miles (16,710 km; 10,380 mi). UB-59 had a displacement of 516 t (508 long tons) while surfaced and 646 t (636 long tons) when submerged. Her engines enabled her to travel at 13.4 knots (24.8 km/h; 15.4 mph) when surfaced and 7.8 knots (14.4 km/h; 9.0 mph) when submerged.

== Summary of raiding history ==
Date	Name	Nationality	Tonnage (Note: Tonnages are in gross register tons)	Fate
28 November 1917	Jeanne Conseil	France	2,309	Sunk
29 November 1917	Texas	France	6,674	Damaged
5 December 1917	City of Naples	United Kingdom	5,739	Damaged
2 February 1918	Avanti	United Kingdom	2,128	Sunk
3 February 1918	Holmtown	United Kingdom	598	Sunk
13 March 1918	Tweed	United Kingdom	1,025	Sunk
14 March 1918	Venezuela	France	730	Sunk
16 March 1918	South Western	United Kingdom	674	Sunk
20 March 1918	Azemmour	France	897	Sunk

== Bibliography ==
- Bendert, Harald (2000). Die UB-Boote der Kaiserlichen Marine, 1914-1918. Einsätze, Erfolge, Schicksal (in German). Hamburg: Verlag E.S. Mittler & Sohn GmbH. ISBN 3-8132-0713-7.
- Gröner, Erich; Jung, Dieter; Maass, Martin (1991). U-boats and Mine Warfare Vessels. German Warships 1815–1945. Vol. 2. Translated by Thomas, Keith; Magowan, Rachel. London: Conway Maritime Press. ISBN 0-85177-593-4.
- Rössler, Eberhard (1979). Die deutschen U-Boote und ihre Werften: eine Bilddokumentation über den deutschen U-Bootbau; in zwei Bänden (in German). Vol. I. Munich: Bernard & Graefe. ISBN 3-7637-5213-7.
