= Operation Seawolf =

World War II U-Boat Film

Operation Seawolf is a 2022 German war film, about a German commander of a World War II German U-boat.

== Plot ==
In 1918 at the end of World War I a German commander would be piloting U-103 sighting the HMT Olympic where the sub intended to torpedo it. Still, it missed and the Olympic would attempt to ram it with the submarine diving in an attempt to evade it only for it to be rammed by the larger vessel with the massive propellers striking it making the submarine sink. The Captain would pass on the mantle to one of his crewmates as the sub go down as the Olympic passes by.

Decades later in World War II, Germany would launch Operation Seawolf in having U-Boats targeting the American sealines with U-Boats with special missiles. They would have successful first run in attacking shipping lanes until America sent their warships taking down some submarines.

== Cast ==
- Hiram A. Murray
- Andrew Stecker
- Apostolos Gliarmis
- Dolph Lundgren
- Frank Grillo
- Bates Wilder as Peter Rudolf, captain of SM U-103. In real life he survived the sinking.

== Home media ==
Its broadcast version is available on YouTube, Tubi, Amazon Video and other streaming services.

== Reception ==
On Rotten Tomatoes it has a 33% critics score approval rating.
