= SM U-103 =

Imperial German submarine sunk by HMT Olympic in 1918

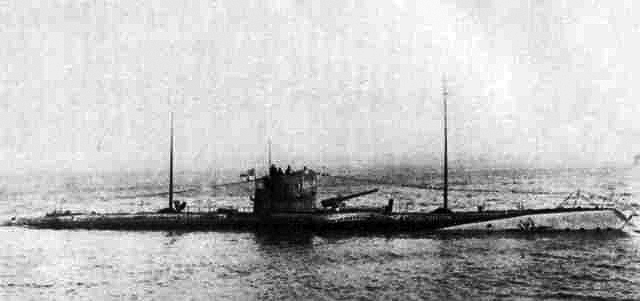

History

German Empire
- Name: U-103
- Ordered: 15 September 1915
- Builder: AG Weser, Bremen
- Yard number: 254
- Laid down: 8 August 1916
- Launched: 9 June 1917
- Commissioned: 15 July 1917
- Fate: Rammed and sunk 12 May 1918

General characteristics
- Class & type: German Type U 57 submarine
- Displacement: 750 t (740 long tons) surfaced; 952 t (937 long tons) submerged
- Length: 67.60 m (221 ft 9 in) (o/a); 54.02 m (177 ft 3 in) (pressure hull)
- Beam: 6.32 m (20 ft 9 in) (o/a); 4.05 m (13 ft 3 in) (pressure hull)
- Height: 8.25 m (27 ft 1 in)
- Draught: 3.65 m (12 ft 0 in)
- Installed power: 2 × 2,400 PS (1,765 kW; 2,367 shp) surfaced; 2 × 1,200 PS (883 kW; 1,184 shp) submerged
- Propulsion: 2 shafts, 2 × 1.65 m (5 ft 5 in) propellers
- Speed: 16.5 knots (30.6 km/h; 19.0 mph) surfaced; 8.8 knots (16.3 km/h; 10.1 mph) submerged
- Range: 10,100 nmi (18,700 km; 11,600 mi) at 8 knots (15 km/h; 9.2 mph) surfaced; 56 nmi (104 km; 64 mi) at 5 knots (9.3 km/h; 5.8 mph) submerged
- Test depth: 50 m (164 ft 1 in)
- Complement: 4 officers, 32 enlisted
- Armament: 4 × 50 cm (19.7 in) torpedo tubes (two bow, two stern); 10–12 torpedoes; 2 × 8.8 cm (3.5 in) SK L/30 deck gun

Service record
- Part of: II Flotilla; 26 August 1917 – 12 May 1918
- Commanders: Kptlt. Claus Rücker; 26 August 1917 – 12 May 1918
- Operations: 5 patrols
- Victories: 8 merchant ships sunk (15,467 GRT); 1 merchant ship damaged (6,042 GRT)

SM U-103 (Note: "SM" stands for "Seiner Majestät" (English: His Majesty's) and combined with the U for Unterseeboot would be translated as His Majesty's Submarine.) was an Imperial German Navy Type U 57 U-boat that was rammed and sunk by HMT Olympic during the First World War. U-103 was built by AG Weser in Bremen, launched on 9 June 1917 and commissioned 15 July 1917. She completed five tours of duty under Kptlt. Claus Rücker and sank eight ships totalling 15,467 gross register tons (GRT) before being lost in the English Channel on 12 May 1918.

== Sinking ==
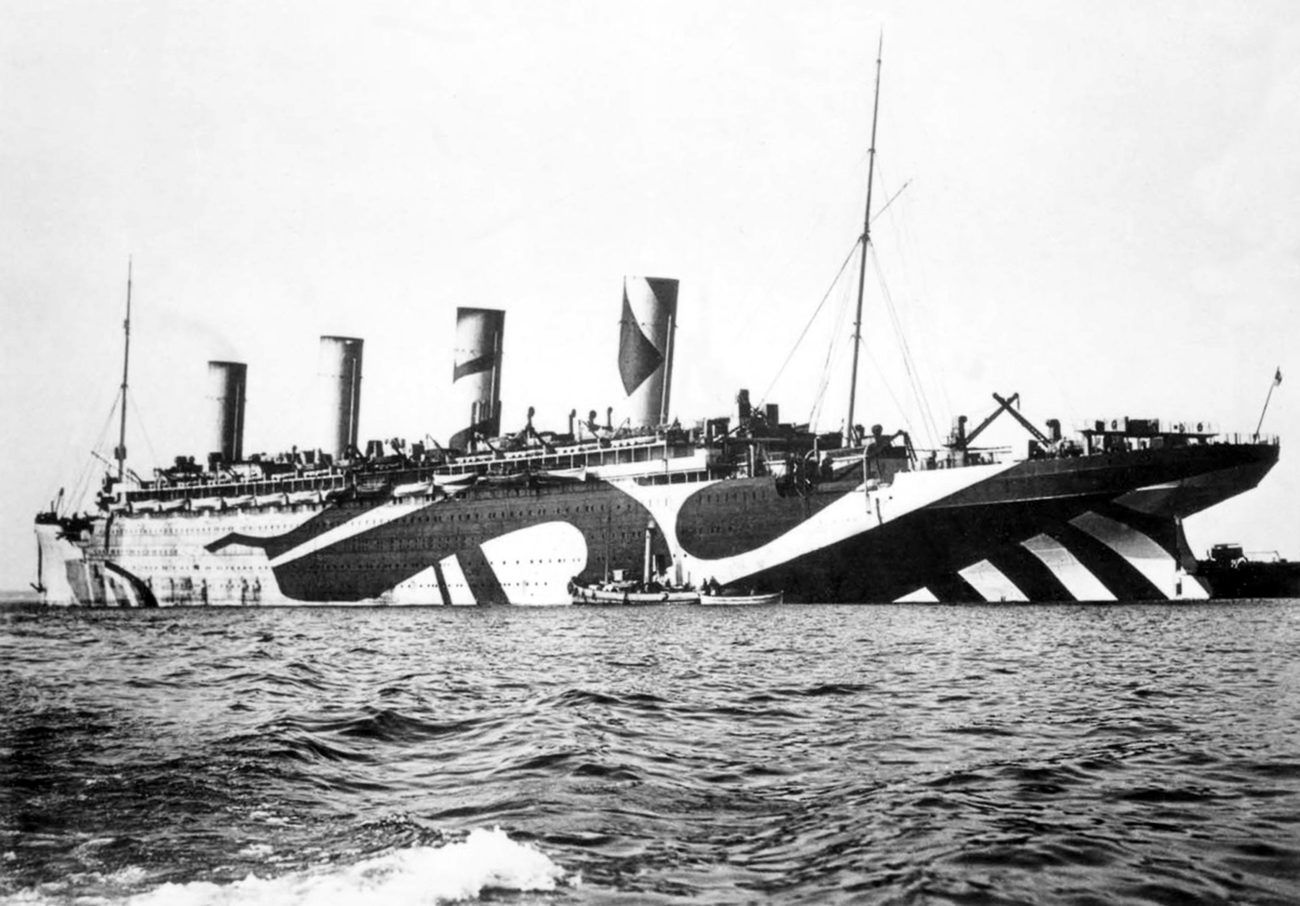
HMT Olympic in dazzle camouflage during the First World War

In the early hours of 12 May 1918, the surfaced U-103 sighted Olympic, the older sister of RMS Titanic and HMHS Britannic, which was carrying U.S. troops to France. The crew prepared to launch torpedoes from her stern torpedo tubes but was unable to flood them in time before the submarine was spotted by Olympic, whose gunners opened fire as the transport ship turned to ram.

SM U-103 started to crash dive to 16 fathoms (96 ft; 29 m) in an attempt to turn to a parallel course to the liner. But there was not enough time before the bow of Olympic rammed the submarine, cutting into its pressure hull just aft of the conning tower. The crew of U-103 blew ballast tanks before scuttling their sinking submarine. Nine crewmen lost their lives. Olympic did not stop to pick up the survivors but continued on to Cherbourg. USS Davis later sighted a distress flare and took 35 survivors to Queenstown (now Cobh) in Ireland.

== Wreck ==
The remains of U-103 lie at a depth of 49 fathoms (294 ft; 90 m) in the English Channel about midway between England and France (49°16′N 4°51′W). Its deep location makes it largely inaccessible to divers but the wreck was surveyed and identified by a remotely operated underwater vehicle in 2012.

== Summary of raiding history ==
Date	Name	Nationality	Tonnage (Note: Tonnages are in gross register tons)	Fate
12 September 1917	St. Margaret	United Kingdom	943	Sunk
12 November 1917	Depute Pierre Goujon	France	4,121	Sunk
16 November 1917	Garron Head	United Kingdom	1,933	Sunk
26 January 1918	Cork	United Kingdom	1,232	Sunk
29 January 1918	Glenfruin	United Kingdom	3,097	Sunk
17 March 1918	Cressida	United Kingdom	150	Sunk
17 March 1918	Sea Gull	United Kingdom	976	Sunk
18 March 1918	Grainton	United Kingdom	6,042	Damaged
20 March 1918	Kassanga	United Kingdom	3,015	Sunk

== In popular culture ==
- Its sinking by the Olympic was shown in the opening of the film Operation Seawolf.

== See also ==
- U-boat Campaign (World War I)

== Bibliography ==
- Gröner, Erich; Jung, Dieter; Maass, Martin (1991). U-boats and Mine Warfare Vessels. German Warships 1815–1945. Vol. 2. Translated by Thomas, Keith; Magowan, Rachel. London: Conway Maritime Press. ISBN 0-85177-593-4.
