= SM UB-83 =

- UB-148 at sea, a U-boat similar to UB-83.

History

German Empire
- Name: UB-83
- Ordered: 23 September 1916
- Builder: AG Weser, Bremen
- Cost: 3,341,000 German Papiermark
- Yard number: 283
- Laid down: 15 January 1917
- Launched: 15 September 1917
- Commissioned: 15 October 1917
- Fate: Sunk 10 September 1918

General characteristics
- Class & type: Type UB III submarine
- Displacement: 516 t (508 long tons) surfaced; 647 t (637 long tons) submerged
- Length: 55.85 m (183 ft 3 in) (o/a)
- Beam: 5.80 m (19 ft)
- Draught: 3.72 m (12 ft 2 in)
- Propulsion: 2 × propeller shaft; 2 × Daimler four-stroke 6-cylinder diesel engines, 1,050 bhp (780 kW); 2 × BBC electric motors, 780 shp (580 kW)
- Speed: 13.4 knots (24.8 km/h; 15.4 mph) surfaced; 7.5 knots (13.9 km/h; 8.6 mph) submerged
- Range: 8,180 nmi (15,150 km; 9,410 mi) at 6 knots (11 km/h; 6.9 mph) surfaced; 50 nmi (93 km; 58 mi) at 4 knots (7.4 km/h; 4.6 mph) submerged
- Test depth: 50 m (160 ft)
- Complement: 3 officers, 31 men
- Armament: 5 × 50 cm (19.7 in) torpedo tubes (4 bow, 1 stern); 10 torpedoes; 1 × 8.8 cm (3.46 in) deck gun

Service record
- Part of: V Flotilla; 24 December 1917 – 10 September 1918
- Commanders: Oblt.z.S. Günther Krause; 15 October 1917 – 9 June 1918; Oblt.z.S. Hans Buntebardt; 10 June – 10 September 1918
- Operations: 6 patrols
- Victories: 1 merchant ship sunk (634 GRT); 1 merchant ship damaged (6,970 GRT)

SM UB-83 was a German Type UB III submarine or U-boat in the German Imperial Navy (German: Kaiserliche Marine) during World War I. She was commissioned into the German Imperial Navy on 15 October 1917 as SM UB-83. (Note: "SM" stands for "Seiner Majestät" (English: His Majesty's) and combined with the U for Unterseeboot would be translated as His Majesty's Submarine.)

UB-83 was sunk on 10 September 1918 by HMS Ophelia off Orkney at 58°28′N 1°50′W, all 35 of the crew members died in the event.

== Construction ==
She was built by AG Weser of Bremen and following just under a year of construction, launched at Bremen on 15 September 1917. UB-83 was commissioned later that same year under the command of Oblt.z.S. Günther Krause. Like all Type UB III submarines, UB-83 carried 10 torpedoes and was armed with a 8.8 cm (3.46 in) deck gun. UB-83 would carry a crew of up to 3 officer and 31 men and had a cruising range of 8,180 nautical miles (15,150 km; 9,410 mi). UB-83 had a displacement of 516 t (508 long tons) while surfaced and 647 t (637 long tons) when submerged. Her engines enabled her to travel at 13.4 knots (24.8 km/h; 15.4 mph) when surfaced and 7.5 knots (13.9 km/h; 8.6 mph) when submerged.

== Summary of raiding history ==
Date	Name	Nationality	Tonnage (Note: Tonnages are in gross register tons)	Fate
23 March 1918	Aulton	United Kingdom	634	Sunk
23 March 1918	Meline	United Kingdom	6,970	Damaged

== Bibliography ==
- Bendert, Harald (2000). Die UB-Boote der Kaiserlichen Marine, 1914-1918. Einsätze, Erfolge, Schicksal (in German). Hamburg: Verlag E.S. Mittler & Sohn GmbH. ISBN 3-8132-0713-7.
- Gröner, Erich; Jung, Dieter; Maass, Martin (1991). U-boats and Mine Warfare Vessels. German Warships 1815–1945. Vol. 2. Translated by Thomas, Keith; Magowan, Rachel. London: Conway Maritime Press. ISBN 0-85177-593-4.
- Rössler, Eberhard (1979). Die deutschen U-Boote und ihre Werften: eine Bilddokumentation über den deutschen U-Bootbau; in zwei Bänden (in German). Vol. I. Munich: Bernard & Graefe. ISBN 3-7637-5213-7.
