= SM UB-49 =

German submarine

History

German Empire
- Name: UB-49
- Ordered: 20 May 1916
- Builder: Blohm & Voss, Hamburg
- Cost: 3,276,000 German Papiermark
- Yard number: 294
- Launched: 6 January 1917
- Commissioned: 28 June 1917
- Fate: Handed over to the United Kingdom 16 January 1919 and broken up in Swansea 1922.

General characteristics
- Class & type: Type UB III submarine
- Displacement: 516 t (508 long tons) surfaced; 651 t (641 long tons) submerged
- Length: 55.30 m (181 ft 5 in) o/a
- Beam: 5.80 m (19 ft)
- Draught: 3.68 m (12 ft 1 in)
- Propulsion: 2 × propeller shaft; 2 × MAN four-stroke 6-cylinder diesel engine, 1,100 PS (810 kW; 1,100 bhp); 2 × Siemens-Schuckert electric motor, 788 PS (580 kW; 777 shp); 450 rpm surfaced; 362 rpm submerged
- Speed: 13.6 knots (25.2 km/h; 15.7 mph) surfaced; 8 knots (15 km/h; 9.2 mph) submerged
- Range: 9,040 nmi (16,740 km; 10,400 mi) at 6 knots (11 km/h; 6.9 mph) surfaced; 55 nmi (102 km; 63 mi) at 4 knots (7.4 km/h; 4.6 mph) submerged
- Test depth: 50 m (160 ft)
- Boats & landing craft carried: 1 dingi
- Complement: 3 officers, 31 men
- Sensors & processing systems: 2 periscopes
- Armament: 5 × 50 cm (19.7 in) torpedo tubes (4 bow, 1 stern); 10 torpedoes; 1 × 8.8 cm (3.46 in) deck gun

Service record
- Part of: Mittelmeer / Mittelmeer II Flotilla; 9 September 1917 – 11 November 1918
- Commanders: Kptlt. Hans von Mellenthin; 28 June 1917 – 12 June 1918; Oblt. z.S. Adolf Ehrensberger; 13 June – 29 November 1918
- Operations: 8 patrols
- Victories: 38 merchant ships sunk (72,287 GRT); 2 auxiliary warships sunk (530 GRT); 7 merchant ships damaged (31,556 GRT)

SM UB-49 was a German Type UB III submarine or U-boat in the German Imperial Navy (German: Kaiserliche Marine) during World War I. She was commissioned into the German Imperial Navy on 28 June 1917 as SM UB-49. (Note: "SM" stands for "Seiner Majestät" (English: His Majesty's) and combined with the U for Unterseeboot would be translated as His Majesty's Submarine.)

UB-49 served mainly in the Mediterranean. In the Austro-Hungarian Navy she was listed as SM U-80. In eight wartime patrols she sank 40 ships totaling 72,817 gross register tons (GRT) and one escort. After the Armistice with Germany UB-49 returned to Kiel via Norway. Handed over to the United Kingdom on 16 January 1919, she was broken up in Swansea in 1922.

== Construction ==
UB-49 was ordered by the German Imperial Navy on 20 May 1916. She was built by Blohm & Voss, Hamburg and following just under a year of construction, launched at Hamburg on 6 January 1917. UB-49 was commissioned later that same year under the command of Kapitänleutnant (Kptlt.) Hans von Mellenthin. Like all Type UB III submarines, UB-49 carried 10 torpedoes and was armed with an 8.8 centimetres (3.5 in) deck gun. UB-49 could carry a crew of up to 34 men and had a cruising range of 9,040 nautical miles (16,740 km; 10,400 mi). UB-49 had a displacement of 516 t (508 long tons) while surfaced and 651 t (641 long tons) when submerged. Her engines enabled her to travel at 13.6 knots (25.2 km/h; 15.7 mph) when surfaced and 8 knots (15 km/h; 9.2 mph) when submerged.

== Service history ==
=== First War Patrol ===
On 22 August 1917, UB-49 left Kiel for Cattaro to join the Pola Flotilla passing the Orkney-Shetland barrier four days later. Before breaking through the Strait of Gibraltar, UB-49 sank six ships, damaging one further. On 9 September 1917 loss of fuel forced UB-49 to change course and make for Cádiz in neutral Spain.

=== Second War Patrol ===
While Spanish authorities planned to intern UB-49 for the duration of the war, her crew managed to repair the damage to the fuel tanks and bunker enough oil to reach Cattaro. On 6 October 1917, UB-49 slipped out of the harbour and reached Cattaro nine days later with no fuel left. After refuelling UB-49 sailed for Pola where the boat was repaired.

=== Third War Patrol ===
On 11 December 1917, UB-49 left Pola for a cruise in the Gulf of Genoa. Already on the first day, UB-49 was attacked by an enemy submarine. The next day, two Italian sailing ships were sunk, while exchanging fire with a coastal battery at the same time. On 15 December 1917, UB-49 managed to sink three steamers out of a convoy leaving Genoa, followed by two more the next day. On 22 December 1917, another two steamers were hit by torpedoes of UB-49. The last torpedo on this cruise UB-49 used on a British steamer off Naples.

=== Fourth War Patrol ===
Between 23 January and 13 February 1918 UB-49 operated in the Gulf of Genoa again, sinking several Italian sailing ships, a British steamer and an Italian escort vessel, G 32. On the way back to Cattaro, UB-49 experienced problems with her ballast tanks east of Malta and dived uncontrolled to a depth of 67 metres (220 ft). Using compressed air to blow out all ballast tanks simultaneously, UB-49 was able to surface again and continue her journey to Cattaro.

=== Fifth War Patrol ===
On 5 March 1918, UB-49 left Cattaro again to operate in the Tyrrhenian Sea. From 13 March 1918 UB-49 pursued a convoy leaving Genoa for Naples and in two days managed to sink three out of four steamers. East of Sardinia, an Italian steamer and a French tug boat fell victim to UB-49. Between 19 and 21 March 1918, UB-49 operated in the Gulf of Naples, sinking several Italian sailing ships and shelling the fortifications of Civitavecchia. A fire in one of the dynamos forced UB-49 to return to base on 25 March 1918.

=== Sixth War Patrol ===
UB-49 sailed on 11 May 1918 for her sixth war patrol, which led her into the Gulf of Lion and the Western Mediterranean. In the last week of May, UB-49 successfully attacked Allied shipping south of the Balearic Islands, sinking three steamers. On 2 June, UB-49 - running low on fuel - turned back to Pola for a major overhaul. When she arrived there on 12 June 1918, Kptlt. von Mellenthin handed over command of UB-49 to Oberleutnant zur See (Oblt.z.S.) Alfred Ehrensberger.

=== Seventh War Patrol ===
After three months in port, UB-49 went to sea again on 11 September 1918. Headed for the Western Mediterranean, Ehrensberger was less successful than von Mellenthin. A strong Allied presence of escorts pressed UB-49 under the surface more and more often. Nevertheless, UB-49 sank two ships off the Spanish coast. UB-49 made port again on 12 October 1918.

=== Eighth War Patrol ===
When it became apparent that Austria-Hungary's situation was untenable, UB-49 was ordered to return to Kiel. Leaving Pola on 29 October 1918 she reached the Norwegian port of Lervik in the last week of November 1918. Together with most of the other U-boats from the Mediterranean, UB-49 arrived in Kiel on 29 November 1918.

=== Aftermath ===
The Armistice with Germany required that all U-boats had to be surrendered to the Allies. UB-49 was handed over to the United Kingdom on 16 January 1919. In 1922 the U-boat was broken up in Swansea.

== Summary of raiding history ==
Ships sunk by SM UB-49
Date	Name	Nationality	Tonnage (Note: Tonnages are in gross register tons)	Fate
2 September 1917	Caracas	Norway	1,077	Sunk
4 September 1917	Theodora	Greece	2,899	Sunk
6 September 1917	Moina	France	168	Sunk
7 September 1917	Brodmead	United Kingdom	5,646	Damaged
7 September 1917	Casa Blanca	Portugal	31	Sunk
7 September 1917	Clan Ferguson	United Kingdom	4,808	Sunk
7 September 1917	Hunsbridge	United Kingdom	3,424	Sunk
16 December 1917	New York	Kingdom of Italy	442	Sunk
16 December 1917	San Francesco di Paola	Kingdom of Italy	51	Sunk
18 December 1917	Giuilo S	Kingdom of Italy	151	Damaged
20 December 1917	Attualita	Kingdom of Italy	4,791	Sunk
20 December 1917	Regin	Norway	1,845	Sunk
20 December 1917	Suruga	United States	4,374	Damaged
21 December 1917	Monte Bianco	Kingdom of Italy	6,968	Damaged
21 December 1917	Stromboli	Kingdom of Italy	5,356	Sunk
22 December 1917	Piemonte	Kingdom of Italy	2,395	Damaged
23 December 1917	Caboto	Kingdom of Italy	4,418	Sunk
25 December 1917	Umballa	United Kingdom	5,310	Sunk
26 January 1918	Caterina	Kingdom of Italy	22	Sunk
28 January 1918	Elsa	Kingdom of Italy	165	Sunk
28 January 1918	Lysi	Kingdom of Italy	247	Sunk
29 January 1918	Ada	Kingdom of Italy	179	Sunk
29 January 1918	Fanny	Kingdom of Italy	74	Sunk
29 January 1918	Lavoro	Kingdom of Italy	160	Sunk
29 January 1918	Lucia Martini	Kingdom of Italy	160	Sunk
29 January 1918	Paolo Meriga	Kingdom of Italy	127	Sunk
4 February 1918	General Church	United Kingdom	6,600	Damaged
7 February 1918	G 32	Regia Marina	237	Sunk
7 February 1918	Mette	Denmark	118	Sunk
13 March 1918	Umta	United Kingdom	5,422	Damaged
13 March 1918	S. Francesco Di Paola D.	Kingdom of Italy	26	Sunk
14 March 1918	Principessa Laetitia	Kingdom of Italy	4,011	Sunk
15 March 1918	Clan McDougall	United Kingdom	4,710	Sunk
17 March 1918	Tripoli	Kingdom of Italy	1,743	Sunk
18 March 1918	Utrecht	French Navy	293	Sunk
19 March 1918	San Francesco di Paola	Kingdom of Italy	70	Sunk
19 March 1918	Giovanni Albonese	Kingdom of Italy	497	Sunk
20 March 1918	Angelo Raffaele	Kingdom of Italy	53	Sunk
21 March 1918	Dante C	Kingdom of Italy	129	Sunk
25 March 1918	Carlo Splendor	Kingdom of Italy	105	Sunk
26 May 1918	Le Gard	France	1,658	Sunk
27 May 1918	Carmela	Kingdom of Italy	128	Sunk
27 May 1918	Uganda	United Kingdom	5,431	Sunk
28 May 1918	Pietro Maroncelli	Kingdom of Italy	5,143	Sunk
3 June 1918	Mecanicien Donzel	France	8,277	Sunk
27 September 1918	Hatasu	United Kingdom	3,193	Sunk
1 October 1918	Francoli	Spain	1,241	Sunk

== Bibliography ==
- Bendert, Harald (2000). Die UB-Boote der Kaiserlichen Marine, 1914-1918. Einsätze, Erfolge, Schicksal (in German). Hamburg: Verlag E.S. Mittler & Sohn GmbH. ISBN 3-8132-0713-7.
- Gröner, Erich; Jung, Dieter; Maass, Martin (1991). U-boats and Mine Warfare Vessels. German Warships 1815–1945. Vol. 2. Translated by Thomas, Keith; Magowan, Rachel. London: Conway Maritime Press. ISBN 0-85177-593-4.
- Rössler, Eberhard (1979). Die deutschen U-Boote und ihre Werften: eine Bilddokumentation über den deutschen U-Bootbau; in zwei Bänden (in German). Vol. I. Munich: Bernard & Graefe. ISBN 3-7637-5213-7.
