= HMS Sturgeon (1917) =

Destroyer of the Royal Navy

History

United Kingdom
- Name: HMS Sturgeon
- Builder: Alexander Stephen and Sons, Govan
- Laid down: 10 November 1915
- Launched: 11 January 1917
- Completed: 26 February 1917
- Fate: 16 December 1926

General characteristics
- Class & type: R-class destroyer
- Displacement: 1,220 long tons (1,240 t) deep load
- Length: 276 ft 1 in (84.15 m) oa
- Beam: 26 ft 9 in (8.15 m)
- Draught: 1 ft 5 1/2 in (0.44 m)
- Installed power: 27,000 shp (20,000 kW)
- Propulsion: 3× Yarrow boilers; Brown-Curtis steam turbines; 3 shafts
- Speed: 36 kn (41 mph; 67 km/h)
- Complement: 82
- Armament: 3 × 4-inch (102 mm) guns; 1 × 2-pounder (40 mm) guns; 4 × 21 inch (533 mm) torpedo tubes

HMS Sturgeon was an R-class destroyer of the British Royal Navy. Sturgeon was built by Alexander Stephen and Sons in Glasgow, Scotland, and was launched on 11 January 1917 and completed in February that year. The ship took its name after Sturgeon, a freshwater fish.

Sturgeon served in the North Sea as part of the Harwich Force during the remainder of the First World War. After the end of the war, the destroyer was used as a tender to the Britannia Royal Naval College at Dartmouth, Devon. Sturgeon was sold for scrap on 16 December 1926.

== Design ==
The R-class was a further development of the M-class destroyer, which had been the last class of destroyers ordered for the Royal Navy before the start of the First World War, and had therefore been built in large numbers during the early years of the war. The R-class differed by having geared rather than direct drive steam turbines, giving greater fuel efficiency, having a higher forecastle for better seakeeping and a larger and more robust bridge structure.

The standard Admiralty R-class ships were 276 feet 1 inch (84.15 m) long overall and 265 feet 0 inches (80.77 m) between perpendiculars, with a beam of 26 feet 9 inches (8.15 m) and a draught of 13 feet 5 1/2 inches (4.102 m). Displacement was 1,072 long tons (1,089 t) normal and 1,220 long tons (1,240 t) deep load. Three Yarrow water-tube boilers fed steam to Brown-Curtis geared steam turbines which drove two propeller shafts. The machinery was rated at 27,000 shaft horsepower (20,000 kW) giving a speed of 36 knots (41 mph; 67 km/h). The ships were armed with three 4-inch (102 mm) QF Mk IV guns, together with one 2-pounder pom-pom anti-aircraft autocannon. Two twin 21-inch (533mm torpedo tubes were fitted. The ships had a crew of 82.

== History ==
Sturgeon was ordered in July 1915 as part of the sixth Emergency War Programme, one of 19 R-class destroyers ordered under that Programme. The destroyer was laid down at Alexander Stephen and Sons' Govan, Glasgow shipyard as Yard number 477 on 10 November 1915, Sturgeon was launched on 11 January 1917, the second ship of that name to be built for the Royal Navy, and was completed on 26 February 1917.

During the First World War, the ship was assigned to the 10th Destroyer Flotilla, as part of the Harwich Force, which operated in the North Sea and could reinforce the Grand Fleet or forces in the English Channel as required. The future physicist Patrick Blackett served on the ship during the war. On 11 March 1918, the ship together with the destroyers Thruster, and Retriever spotted the conning tower of a German submarine in the southern North Sea, and attacked with depth charges. The submarine broke surface at a high angle and was depth charged again, bringing up oil and wreckage, including a wooden ladder, a life buoy and a calcium flare. The attack was credited by the British Admiralty as sinking the German submarine SM UB-54, but other sources state that the attack was well away from UB-54's planned patrol area and the submarine attacked was SM UB-78, which survived the attack with a damaged oil tank, with the exact date and cause of UB-54's loss unknown. On 20 April 1918, Sturgeon was one of five destroyers of the Harwich force, led by Thruster, which were sent to attack German minesweepers which had been spotted by aircraft. They encountered four German torpedo boats (Note: S55, V71, V73 and G91) off Terschelling, which were on passage to Flanders and were being escorted through a British minefield by the minesweepers. A long-range exchange of fire occurred between the British destroyers and the German torpedo boats, with Sturgeon being hit in the engine room by a German shell. The action was broken off when German covering forces were sighted, and Sturgeon was towed back to Harwich.

Sturgeon remained part of the Harwich Force at the end of the war on 11 November 1918, but on 21 February 1919, was based at Devonport and attached to the Royal Navy College at Dartmouth, Devon, initially as a tender to the stationary training ship Pomone. Sturgeon normally took a load of cadets to sea from Dartmouth on a short instructional trip once each week. On 18 October 1921, Sturgeon stood by the laid up steamer Manchurian Prince in Dartmouth harbour when the steamer suffered an engine room fire. In June 1922, Pomone paid off, with Sturgeon continuing her cadet training role as an independent ship. In October 1925, Sturgeon was replaced as tender to Dartmouth College by the minesweeper Forres.

She was sold for breaking up on 16 December 1926 to Plymouth & Devon Ship Breaking Company of Plymouth.

The ship's official badge is in the collections of the Imperial War Museum.

== Pennant numbers ==
Pennant number	Dates
F49	1917–January 1918
G17	January 1918–April 1918
F47	April 1918 –
