= SM U-154 =

WWI Submarine served the Imperial German Navy, sunk in 1918 by the Royal Navy

History

German Empire
- Name: U-154
- Ordered: 29 November 1916
- Builder: Flensburger Schiffbau-Gesellschaft, Flensburg
- Yard number: 381
- Launched: 10 September 1917
- Commissioned: 12 December 1917
- Fate: Sunk 11 May 1918

General characteristics
- Class & type: Type U 151 submarine
- Displacement: 1,512 tonnes (1,488 long tons) (surfaced); 1,875 tonnes (1,845 long tons) (submerged); 2,272 tonnes (2,236 long tons) (total)
- Length: 65.00 m (213 ft 3 in) (o/a); 57.00 m (187 ft) (pressure hull)
- Beam: 8.90 m (29 ft 2 in) (o/a); 5.80 m (19 ft) (pressure hull)
- Height: 9.25 m (30 ft 4 in)
- Draught: 5.30 m (17 ft 5 in)
- Installed power: 800 PS (590 kW; 790 bhp) (surfaced); 800 PS (590 kW; 790 bhp) (submerged)
- Propulsion: 2 × shafts, 2 × 1.60 m (5 ft 3 in) propellers
- Speed: 12.4 knots (23.0 km/h; 14.3 mph) surfaced; 5.2 knots (9.6 km/h; 6.0 mph) submerged
- Range: 25,000 nmi (46,000 km; 29,000 mi) at 5.5 knots (10.2 km/h; 6.3 mph) surfaced, 65 nmi (120 km; 75 mi) at 3 knots (5.6 km/h; 3.5 mph) submerged
- Test depth: 50 metres (160 ft)
- Complement: 6 officers, 50 enlisted
- Armament: 2 50 cm (20 in) bow torpedo tubes; 18 torpedoes; 2 × 15 cm (5.9 in) SK L/45 deck guns with 1672 rounds; 2 × 8.8 cm (3.5 in) SK L/30 deck guns with 764 rounds

Service record
- Part of: U-Kreuzer Flotilla; Unknown start - 11 May 1918
- Commanders: KrvKpt. Hermann Gercke; 12 December 1917 - 11 May 1918
- Operations: 1 patrol
- Victories: 5 merchant ships sunk (8,132 GRT); 4 merchant ships damaged (18,220 GRT)

SM U-154 was one of the 329 submarines serving in the Imperial German Navy in World War I. U-154 was engaged in the naval warfare and took part in the First Battle of the Atlantic.

On 11 May 1918, U-154 was torpedoed and sunk in the Atlantic Ocean at 36°51′N 11°50′W by the Royal Navy submarine HMS E35 with the loss of all 77 of her crew.

== Summary of raiding history ==
| Date | Name | Nationality | Tonnage (Note: Merchant ship tonnages are in gross register tons. Military vessels are listed by tons displacement.) | Fate |
|---|---|---|---|---|
| 12 March 1918 | Nordkyn | Norway | 3,244 | Sunk |
| 17 March 1918 | Guadalquivir | Spain | 2,078 | Sunk |
| 21 March 1918 | Chincha | United States | 6,371 | Damaged |
| 26 March 1918 | Beira Alta | Portugal | 101 | Sunk |
| 7 April 1918 | La Bruyere | France | 2,198 | Damaged |
| 9 April 1918 | President Howard | Liberia | 73 | Sunk |
| 10 April 1918 | Burutu | United Kingdom | 3,902 | Damaged |
| 21 April 1918 | Michelet | France | 2,636 | Sunk |
| 25 April 1918 | Kawachi Maru | Empire of Japan | 5,749 | Damaged |

== Bibliography ==
- Gröner, Erich; Jung, Dieter; Maass, Martin (1991). U-boats and Mine Warfare Vessels. German Warships 1815–1945. Vol. 2. Translated by Thomas, Keith; Magowan, Rachel. London: Conway Maritime Press. ISBN 0-85177-593-4.
- Jung, Dieter (2004). Die Schiffe der Kaiserlichen Marine 1914-1918 und ihr Verbleib [German Imperial Navy ships 1914-1918 and their fate] (in German). Bonn: Bernard & Graefe. ISBN 3-7637-6247-7.
