= HMS Thruster (1917) =

Destroyer of the Royal Navy

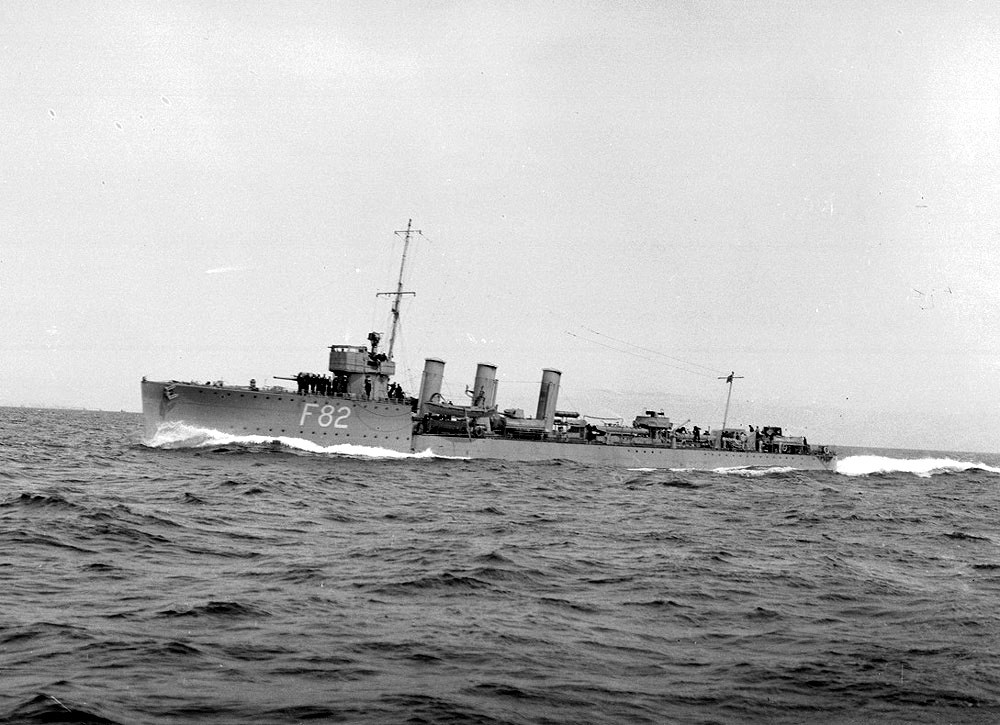
- Sister ship HMS Thisbe at sea in 1917

History

United Kingdom
- Name: HMS Thruster
- Builder: Hawthorn Leslie and Company, Hebburn
- Laid down: 2 June 1916
- Launched: 10 January 1917
- Commissioned: 30 March 1917
- Out of service: 16 March 1937
- Fate: Sold to be broken up

General characteristics
- Class & type: R-class destroyer
- Displacement: 975 long tons (991 t) (normal); 1,035 long tons (1,052 t) (deep load)
- Length: 265 ft (80.8 m) (p.p.)
- Beam: 26 ft 9 in (8.2 m)
- Draught: 9 ft 8 in (2.9 m)
- Installed power: 3 Yarrow boilers, 27,000 shp (20,000 kW)
- Propulsion: Geared Parsons steam turbines, 2 shafts
- Speed: 36 knots (41 mph; 67 km/h)
- Range: 3,440 nmi (6,370 km) at 15 kn (28 km/h)
- Complement: 82
- Armament: 3 × single QF 4-inch (102 mm) Mark IV guns; 1 × single QF 2-pdr 40 mm (2 in) AA gun; 2 × twin 21 in (533 mm) torpedo tubes

HMS Thruster was an R-class destroyer which served with the Royal Navy during the First World War. The R class were an improvement on the previous M class with geared steam turbines to improve efficiency. Built by Hawthorn Leslie and launched in January 1917, Thruster joined the Harwich Force, serving as part of a flotilla that escorted the monitors Erebus and Terror in their bombardment of Ostend in June that year. During the following month, Thruster, along with sister ship Springbok, captured the two German merchant ships SS Brietzig and SS Pellworm. The destroyer was also jointly credited with sinking the submarine UB-54 the following year. After the signing of the Armistice that ended the war, the destroyer was allocated to anti-submarine research and helped in the development of anti-submarine tactics with ASDIC. In April 1928, the ship took part in a high-speed demonstration for the King of Afghanistan, the Amanullah Khan, and, in January 1932, participated in the unsuccessful search for the crew of the submarine M2. Placed in reserve at the Nore in June 1936, Thruster was sold to be broken up in March 1937.

== Design and development ==
Thruster was one of twelve R-class destroyers ordered by the British Admiralty in March 1916 as part of the Eighth War Construction Programme. The R class were a development of the preceding M-class, but differed in having geared turbines to improve fuel consumption, the central gun mounted on a bandstand and minor changes to improve seakeeping.

The destroyer was 265 feet (80.8 m) long between perpendiculars, with a beam of 26 feet 9 inches (8.2 m) and a draught of 9 feet 10 inches (3.0 m). Displacement was 975 long tons (991 t) normal and 1,035 long tons (1,052 t) at deep load. Power was provided by three Yarrow boilers feeding two Parsons geared steam turbines rated at 27,000 shaft horsepower (20,000 kW) and driving two shafts, to give a design speed of 36 knots (67 km/h; 41 mph). Three funnels were fitted. A total of 296 long tons (301 t) of oil was carried, giving a design range of 3,450 nautical miles (6,390 km; 3,970 mi) at 15 kn (28 km/h; 17 mph).

Armament consisted of three single QF 4-inch (102 mm) Mk IV guns on the ship's centreline, with one on the forecastle, one aft on a raised platform and one between the second and third funnels. A single QF 2-pounder 40 mm (2 in) "pom-pom" anti-aircraft gun was carried, while torpedo armament consisted of two rotating twin mounts for 21 in (533 mm) torpedoes. The destroyer was fitted with racks and storage for depth charges. Initially, only two depth charges were carried but the number increased in service and by 1918, the vessel was carrying between 30 and 50 depth charges. The ship had a complement of 82 officers and ratings.

== Construction and career ==
Thruster was laid down by Hawthorn Leslie and Company in Hebburn on 2 June 1916, launched on 10 January 1917 and completed on 30 March 1917. The ship was the first of the name in Royal Navy service. On commissioning, Thruster joined the Tenth Destroyer Flotilla of the Harwich Force. The deployment was part of an overall strategy to increase the number of destroyers in naval service.

On 4 June 1917, the destroyer formed part of the escort for the monitors Erebus and Terror in their bombardment of Ostend. Out of the 115 shells fired, 20 hit the dockyard or nearby. This was to be the last such attack for many months. On 14 July, the destroyer was cruising alongside sister ship Tarpon when the latter was struck by a mine. Thruster took the damaged ship under tow back to Dunkirk. The following day, the destroyer encountered six German merchant ships off the coast of Texel. Along with fellow destroyer Springbok, Thruster captured two, SS Brietzig and SS Pellworm. Of the remainder, only one escaped to harbour. As the destroyer escorted the prizes back to Harwich, they were attacked by a torpedo launched by an unknown German submarine, but suffered no hits. The capture had taken place in neutral Dutch waters, so an apology was made to the government of the Netherlands.

On 29 January 1918, the ship collided with Skilful, both destroyers suffering some damage, but Thruster was very quickly back in service. Thruster was credited with the destruction of the submarine UB-54 by depth charges on 12 March with Retriever and Sturgeon off the east coast of Britain near the port of Skegness. On 1 October, the destroyer returned to the Flanders coast for what would be one of the last patrols of the war. There were no incidents and the British ships returned unscathed. After the Armistice of 11 November that ended the war, the Royal Navy returned to a peacetime level of strength and both the number of ships and the amount of personnel in service needed to be reduced to save money. Thruster remained part of the Tenth Destroyer Flotilla at the end of the war but was re-commissioned with a reduced complement on 19 October 1919 and acted as tender to Actaeon as part of the torpedo school HMS Vernon. After being reduced to reserve crew on 6 February 1923, Thruster was recommissioned in Portsmouth as part of the Portland Anti-Submarine Flotilla on 26 May 1926. While there, the ship took part in a number of trials of anti-submarine tactics as part of the development of ASDIC. On 26 July 1924, the vessel participated in a naval review in front of George V.

At the end of June and beginning of July 1927, the flotilla took part in exercises off Lamlash with the battlecruiser Tiger. On 22 March 1928, Thruster collided with the submarine R4 while involved in an anti-submarine exercise involving both destroyers and submarines. There were.no casualties and the destroyer was undamaged. On 3 April, the four destroyers of the Portland Anti-Submarine Flotilla, including Thruster, undertook a display of speed and dexterity, using depth charges to create a spectacle, for Amanullah Khan, the King of Afghanistan, while he was on a state visit. During the following year, the destroyer joined the flotilla on visits to the Scilly Isles between 23 and 25 July, Dartmouth from 27 to 29 July and Torquay, leaving on 1 August, before returning to Portland. Another cruise, which involved visits to Clovelly, Falmouth and Torquay, took place two years later between 4 and 14 July. Thruster was also involved in the unsuccessful search for the crew of the submarine M2, sunk on 26 January 1932.

During 1933, the destroyer, along with the rest of the flotilla, was transferred to Chatham and given a full crew by 1 June. Thruster was considered as part of the planned Royal Navy deployment in defence of traffic between Port Said and Alexandria on 19 October 1935 after the start of the Second Italo-Ethiopian War but withdrew before the outbreak of hostilities between Italy and the United Kingdom, which would not take place until 10 June 1940. The destroyer returned to Chatham on 21 April 1936. Soon after, on 11 June, the ship was transferred to reserve at the Nore. The Royal Navy planned to retire older vessels as more modern destroyers were being introduced. On 16 March 1937, Thruster was sold to Thos. W. Ward to be broken up at Grays.

== Pennant numbers ==
Pennant number	Date
F74	September 1917
F76	January 1918
G81	January 1919
H73	January 1922
