= SM UB-54 =

- UB-148 at sea, a U-boat similar to UB-54.

History

German Empire
- Name: UB-54
- Ordered: 20 May 1916
- Builder: AG Weser, Bremen
- Cost: 3,276,000 German Papiermark
- Yard number: 266
- Laid down: 5 September 1916
- Launched: 18 April 1917
- Commissioned: 12 June 1917
- Fate: Sunk 11 March 1918

General characteristics
- Class & type: Type UB III submarine
- Type: Coastal submarine
- Displacement: 516 t (508 long tons) surfaced; 646 t (636 long tons) submerged
- Length: 55.85 m (183 ft 3 in) (o/a)
- Beam: 5.80 m (19 ft)
- Draught: 3.72 m (12 ft 2 in)
- Propulsion: 2 × propeller shaft; 2 × Körting four-stroke 6-cylinder diesel engines, 1,050 bhp (780 kW); 2 × Siemens-Schuckert electric motors, 780 shp (580 kW)
- Speed: 13.4 knots (24.8 km/h; 15.4 mph) surfaced; 7.8 knots (14.4 km/h; 9.0 mph) submerged
- Range: 9,020 nmi (16,710 km; 10,380 mi) at 6 knots (11 km/h; 6.9 mph) surfaced; 55 nmi (102 km; 63 mi) at 4 knots (7.4 km/h; 4.6 mph) submerged
- Test depth: 50 m (160 ft)
- Complement: 3 officers, 31 men
- Armament: 5 × 50 cm (19.7 in) torpedo tubes (4 bow, 1 stern); 10 torpedoes; 1 × 8.8 cm (3.46 in) deck gun

Service record
- Part of: Flandern Flotilla; 8 August 1917 - 31 March 1918
- Commanders: Oblt.z.S. Egon von Werner; 12 June 1917 – 7 February 1918; Oblt.z.S. Erich Hecht; 8 February – 31 March 1918
- Operations: 6 patrols
- Victories: 13 merchant ships sunk (6,184 GRT); 1 auxiliary warship sunk (1,016 GRT)

SM UB-54 was a German Type UB III submarine or U-boat in the German Imperial Navy (German: Kaiserliche Marine) during World War I. She was commissioned into the Flanders Flotilla of the German Imperial Navy on 12 June 1917 as SM UB-54. (Note: "SM" stands for "Seiner Majestät" (English: His Majesty's) and combined with the U for Unterseeboot would be translated as His Majesty's Submarine.)

The submarine conducted 6 patrols and sank 14 ships during the war for a total loss of 7,200 gross register tons (GRT).

She operated as part of the Flanders Flotilla based in Zeebrugge. UB-54 was apparently sunk on 11 March 1918 at 53°15′N 0°45′E by British destroyers HMS Sturgeon, Thruster, and Retriever using depth charges, all hands were lost.

== Construction ==
UB-54 was ordered 20 May 1916. She was built by AG Weser, Bremen and following just under a year of construction, launched at Bremen on 18 April 1917. UB-54 was commissioned later that same year under the command of Oblt.z.S. Egon von Werner.Like all Type UB III submarines, UB-54 carried 10 torpedoes and was armed with a 8.8 cm (3.46 in) deck gun. UB-54 would carry a crew of up to 3 officer and 31 men and had a cruising range of 9,020 nautical miles (16,710 km; 10,380 mi). UB-54 had a displacement of 516 t (508 long tons) while surfaced and 646 t (636 long tons; 712 short tons) when submerged. Her engines enabled her to travel at 13.4 knots (24.8 km/h; 15.4 mph) when surfaced and 7.8 knots (14.4 km/h; 9.0 mph) when submerged.

== Summary of raiding history ==
Date	Name	Nationality	Tonnage (Note: Merchant ship tonnages are in gross register tons. Military vessels are listed by tons displacement.)	Fate
20 August 1917	HMS Vala	Royal Navy	1,016	Sunk
25 August 1917	Frigga	Norway	1,046	Sunk
13 December 1917	Chili	France	1,318	Sunk
20 December 1917	Noris	Norway	583	Sunk
21 December 1917	Orne	France	928	Sunk
23 December 1917	Ragna	Norway	1,747	Sunk
27 January 1918	Nr. 14	Belgium	26	Sunk
29 January 1918	De Julia	Belgium	13	Sunk
29 January 1918	De Twee Marcels	Belgium	13	Sunk
29 January 1918	H. Debra Huysseme	Belgium	46	Sunk
29 January 1918	Jean Mathilde	Belgium	12	Sunk
29 January 1918	Le Jeune Arthur	Belgium	25	Sunk
29 January 1918	Marie	Belgium	16	Sunk
30 January 1918	Ferryhill	United Kingdom	411	Sunk

== Bibliography ==
- Bendert, Harald (2000). Die UB-Boote der Kaiserlichen Marine, 1914-1918. Einsätze, Erfolge, Schicksal (in German). Hamburg: Verlag E.S. Mittler & Sohn GmbH. ISBN 3-8132-0713-7.
- Gröner, Erich; Jung, Dieter; Maass, Martin (1991). U-boats and Mine Warfare Vessels. German Warships 1815–1945. Vol. 2. Translated by Thomas, Keith; Magowan, Rachel. London: Conway Maritime Press. ISBN 0-85177-593-4.
- Rössler, Eberhard (1979). Die deutschen U-Boote und ihre Werften: eine Bilddokumentation über den deutschen U-Bootbau; in zwei Bänden (in German). Vol. I. Munich: Bernard & Graefe. ISBN 3-7637-5213-7.
