= SM UB-78 =

German Navy Submarine

- UB-148 at sea, a U-boat similar to UB-78.

History

German Empire
- Name: UB-78
- Ordered: 23 September 1916
- Builder: Blohm & Voss, Hamburg
- Cost: 3,338,000 German Papiermark
- Yard number: 307
- Launched: 2 June 1917
- Commissioned: 20 October 1917
- Fate: Sunk on 19 April 1918

General characteristics
- Class & type: Type UB III submarine
- Displacement: 516 t (508 long tons) surfaced; 648 t (638 long tons) submerged
- Length: 55.30 m (181 ft 5 in) (o/a)
- Beam: 5.80 m (19 ft)
- Draught: 3.68 m (12 ft 1 in)
- Propulsion: 2 × propeller shaft; 2 × MAN four-stroke 6-cylinder diesel engines, 1,085 bhp (809 kW); 2 × Siemens-Schuckert electric motors, 780 shp (580 kW)
- Speed: 13.6 knots (25.2 km/h; 15.7 mph) surfaced; 7.8 knots (14.4 km/h; 9.0 mph) submerged
- Range: 8,680 nmi (16,080 km; 9,990 mi) at 8 knots (15 km/h; 9.2 mph) surfaced; 55 nmi (102 km; 63 mi) at 4 knots (7.4 km/h; 4.6 mph) submerged
- Test depth: 50 m (160 ft)
- Complement: 3 officers, 31 men
- Armament: 5 × 50 cm (19.7 in) torpedo tubes (4 bow, 1 stern); 10 torpedoes; 1 × 8.8 cm (3.46 in) deck gun

Service record
- Part of: V Flotilla; 2 January – 18 February 1918; Flandern I Flotilla; 18 February – 19 April 1918
- Commanders: Kptlt. Woldemar Petri; 20 October 1917 – 15 February 1918; Oblt.z.S. Ulrich Pilzecker; 16 February – 17 March 1918; Oblt.z.S. Arthur Stoßberg; 18 March – 19 April 1918
- Operations: 5 patrols
- Victories: 1 merchant ship sunk (1,155 GRT); 1 auxiliary warship sunk (86 GRT); 2 merchant ships damaged (7,040 GRT)

SM UB-78 was a German Type UB III submarine or U-boat in the German Imperial Navy (German: Kaiserliche Marine) during World War I. She was commissioned into the German Imperial Navy on 20 October 1917 as SM UB-78. (Note: "SM" stands for "Seiner Majestät" (English: His Majesty's) and combined with the U for Unterseeboot would be translated as His Majesty's Submarine.) The submarine struck a naval mine off Dover and sank at position 51°01′N 01°17′E on 19 April 1918 all 35 crew lost.

== Construction ==
She was built by Blohm & Voss of Hamburg and following just under a year of construction, launched at Hamburg on 2 June 1917. UB-78 was commissioned later that same year under the command of Kptlt. Woldemar Petri. Like all Type UB III submarines, UB-78 carried 10 torpedoes and was armed with a 8.8 cm (3.46 in) deck gun. UB-78 would carry a crew of up to 3 officers and 31 men and had a cruising range of 8,680 nautical miles (16,080 km; 9,990 mi). UB-78 had a displacement of 516 t (508 long tons) while surfaced and 648 t (638 long tons) when submerged. Her engines enabled her to travel at 13.6 knots (25.2 km/h; 15.7 mph) when surfaced and 7.8 knots (14.4 km/h; 9.0 mph) when submerged.

== Summary of raiding history ==
| Date | Name | Nationality | Tonnage (Note: Merchant ship tonnages are in gross register tons. Military vessels are listed by tons displacement.) | Fate |
|---|---|---|---|---|
| 21 March 1918 | Strathearn | United Kingdom | 152 | Damaged |
| 22 March 1918 | Polleon | United Kingdom | 1,155 | Sunk |
| 25 March 1918 | HMD Border Lads | Royal Navy | 86 | Sunk |
| 26 March 1918 | British Star | United Kingdom | 6,888 | Damaged |

== Bibliography ==
- Bendert, Harald (2000). Die UB-Boote der Kaiserlichen Marine, 1914-1918. Einsätze, Erfolge, Schicksal (in German). Hamburg: Verlag E.S. Mittler & Sohn GmbH. ISBN 3-8132-0713-7.
- Gröner, Erich; Jung, Dieter; Maass, Martin (1991). U-boats and Mine Warfare Vessels. German Warships 1815–1945. Vol. 2. Translated by Thomas, Keith; Magowan, Rachel. London: Conway Maritime Press. ISBN 0-85177-593-4.
- Helgason, Guðmundur (2018). "UB 78". uboat.net.
- Rössler, Eberhard (1979). Die deutschen U-Boote und ihre Werften: eine Bilddokumentation über den deutschen U-Bootbau; in zwei Bänden (in German). Vol. I. Munich: Bernard & Graefe. ISBN 3-7637-5213-7.
