= HMS Retriever =

British R-class destroyer

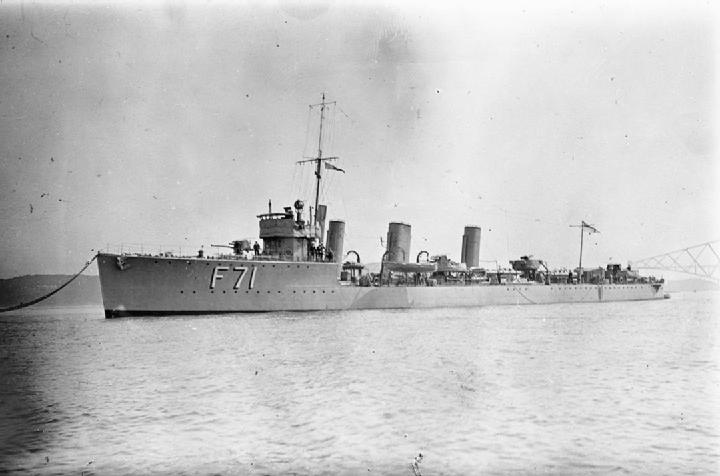
- Sister ship HMS Taurus

History

United Kingdom
- Name: Retriever
- Ordered: July 1915
- Builder: Thornycroft, Woolston
- Launched: 15 January 1917
- Decommissioned: 26 July 1927
- Fate: Broken up

General characteristics
- Class & type: R-class destroyer
- Displacement: 1,035 long tons (1,052 t) (normal); 1,208 long tons (1,227 t) (deep load)
- Length: 274 ft 3 in (84 m) o.a.
- Beam: 27 ft 3 in (8.3 m)
- Draught: 9 ft (2.7 m)
- Installed power: 3 Yarrow boilers, 27,000 shp (20,000 kW)
- Propulsion: Brown-Curtis geared steam turbines, 2 shafts
- Speed: 36 knots (41 mph; 67 km/h)
- Range: 3,450 nautical miles (6,390 km) at 20 knots (37 km/h)
- Complement: 82
- Armament: 3 × single QF 4-inch (102 mm) Mark IV guns; 1 × single 2-pdr 40 mm (2 in) AA gun; 2 × twin 21 in (533 mm) torpedo tubes

HMS Retriever was a Thornycroft-built R-class destroyer which served with the Royal Navy during the First World War. Launched in 1917, the vessel formed part of the Harwich Force and took part in operations off the coast of Ostend in support of the bombardment of the town in June that year. During August the following year, the vessel attempted to deploy a seaplane from a towed lighter, but a lack of wind meant the operation was unsuccessful. The vessel was also jointly credited with the destruction of the submarine SM UB-54 that year, although this has been disputed. After the war, the ship was placed in reserve and was sold to be broken up in 1927.

== Design and development ==
Retriever was one of three R-class destroyers ordered by the British Admiralty from Thornycroft of Woolston, Southampton, in July 1915 as part of the Sixth War Construction Programme. The ships differed from the six preceding Thornycroft M-class built by the yard, in having all geared turbines and the aft gun being raised on a bandstand. Like other Thornycroft-built vessels, they differed from the rest of the R class in having flat sided funnels.

Retriever had a long overall of 274 feet 3 inches (84 m), with a beam of 27 ft 3 in (8.31 m) and a draught of 9 ft (2.7 m). Displacement was 1,035 long tons (1,052 t) normal and 1,208 long tons (1,227 t) at deep load.Three Yarrow boilers fed steam to two sets of Brown-Curtis geared steam turbines rated at 27,000 shaft horsepower (20,000 kW) and driving two shafts, giving a design speed of 35 knots (65 km/h; 40 mph). Three funnels were fitted. A total of 296 long tons (301 t) of fuel oil was carried, giving a design range of 3,450 nautical miles (6,390 km; 3,970 mi) at 20 knots (37 km/h; 23 mph).

Armament consisted of three single 4-inch (102 mm) Mk IV guns on the ship's centreline, with one on the forecastle, one aft on a raised bandstand and one between the second and third funnels. A single 2-pounder 40 mm (2 in) "pom-pom" anti-aircraft gun was carried, along with four 21-inch (533 mm) torpedoes in two twin rotating mounts. The destroyer was fitted with racks and storage for depth charges. Initially, only two depth charges were carried but the number increased in service and by 1918, the vessel was carrying between 30 and 50 depth charges.

== Construction and career ==
Retriever was laid down in January 1916 and launched on 15 January 1917. On being completed in March 1917, the ship joined the Harwich Force, serving as part of the Tenth Destroyer Flotilla until the end of the war. On 4 June the vessel formed part of a flotilla led by the light cruiser Undaunted that escorted the Erebus class monitors Erebus and Terror in their bombardment of Ostend. The flotilla was tasked with patrolling Schouwen Bank, but encountered no opposition. Between 16 and 17 October, the destroyer was again called upon to be part of an even larger force of 84 warships sent out to search for a German fleet based around a minelayer, although once again Retriever saw no action. The ship was credited with the destruction of the submarine SM UB-54 with depth charges on 12 March 1918 with the destroyers Sturgeon and Thruster but this has been disputed. The destroyer was subsequently equipped to tow a lighter which carried a seaplane, but a lack of wind meant that operations were curtailed at the first attempt to launch the aircraft on 10 August.

After the Armistice of 11 November 1918 that ended the war, the Royal Navy returned to a peacetime level of strength and both the number of ships and the amount of personnel in service needed to be reduced to save money. Placed in reserve, Retriever was allocated to the Home Fleet, serving under the dreadnought battleship King George V. However, in 1923, the Navy decided to scrap many of the older destroyers in preparation for the introduction of newer and larger vessels. The destroyer was sold for breaking up on 26 July 1927 to Hughes Bolckow of Blyth.

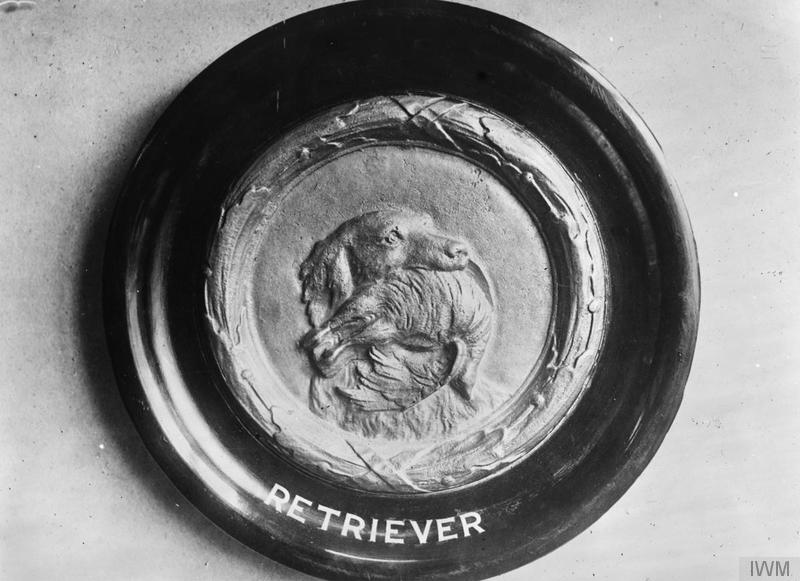
Ship badge for Retriever

== Pennant numbers ==
Pennant numbers
Pennant number	Date
F64	September 1915
H89	February 1915
F58	January 1918
D89	November 1918
G66	January 1919
H42	January 1922
