= SM UC-67 =

1916 German type UC II minelaying U-boat

History

German Empire
- Name: UC-67
- Ordered: 12 January 1916
- Builder: Blohm & Voss, Hamburg
- Yard number: 283
- Launched: 6 August 1916
- Commissioned: 10 December 1916
- Fate: Surrendered, 16 January 1919; broken up, 1919 – 20

General characteristics
- Class & type: Type UC II submarine
- Displacement: 427 t (420 long tons), surfaced; 508 t (500 long tons), submerged
- Length: 50.35 m (165 ft 2 in) o/a; 40.30 m (132 ft 3 in) pressure hull
- Beam: 5.22 m (17 ft 2 in) o/a; 3.65 m (12 ft) pressure hull
- Draught: 3.64 m (11 ft 11 in)
- Propulsion: 2 × propeller shafts; 2 × 6-cylinder, 4-stroke diesel engines, 600 PS (440 kW; 590 shp); 2 × electric motors, 620 PS (460 kW; 610 shp)
- Speed: 12.0 knots (22.2 km/h; 13.8 mph), surfaced; 7.4 knots (13.7 km/h; 8.5 mph), submerged
- Range: 10,420 nmi (19,300 km; 11,990 mi) at 7 knots (13 km/h; 8.1 mph) surfaced; 52 nmi (96 km; 60 mi) at 4 knots (7.4 km/h; 4.6 mph) submerged
- Test depth: 50 m (160 ft)
- Complement: 26
- Armament: 6 × 100 cm (39.4 in) mine tubes; 18 × UC 200 mines; 3 × 50 cm (19.7 in) torpedo tubes (2 bow/external; one stern); 7 × torpedoes; 1 × 8.8 cm (3.5 in) Uk L/30 deck gun
- Notes: 35-second diving time

Service record
- Part of: Pola / Mittelmeer / Mittelmeer II Flotilla; 29 March 1917 – 11 November 1918
- Commanders: Oblt.z.S. / Kptlt. Karl Neumann; 10 December 1916 – 14 June 1918; Oblt.z.S. Martin Niemöller; 15 June – 29 November 1918
- Operations: 11 patrols
- Victories: 49 merchant ships sunk (84,604 GRT); 1 warship sunk (834 tons); 4 auxiliary warships sunk (8,682 GRT + Unknown GRT); 2 merchant ships damaged (8,100 GRT); 1 auxiliary warship damaged (149 GRT)

SM UC-67 was a German Type UC II minelaying submarine or U-boat in the German Imperial Navy (German: Kaiserliche Marine) during World War I. The U-boat was ordered on 12 January 1916 and was launched on 6 August 1916. She was commissioned into the German Imperial Navy on 10 December 1916 as SM UC-67. (Note: "SM" stands for "Seiner Majestät" (English: His Majesty's) and combined with the U for Unterseeboot would be translated as His Majesty's Submarine.) In eleven patrols UC-67 was credited with sinking 54 ships, either by torpedo or by mines laid. UC-67 was surrendered on 16 January 1919 and broken up at Briton Ferry in 1919 – 20.

== Design ==
A Type UC II submarine, UC-67 had a displacement of 427 tonnes (420 long tons) when at the surface and 508 tonnes (500 long tons) while submerged. She had a length overall of 50.35 m (165 ft 2 in), a beam of 5.22 m (17 ft 2 in), and a draught of 3.64 m (11 ft 11 in). The submarine was powered by two six-cylinder four-stroke diesel engines each producing 300 metric horsepower (220 kW; 300 shp) (a total of 600 metric horsepower (440 kW; 590 shp)), two electric motors producing 620 metric horsepower (460 kW; 610 shp), and two propeller shafts. She had a dive time of 48 seconds and was capable of operating at a depth of 50 metres (160 ft).

The submarine had a maximum surface speed of 12 knots (22 km/h; 14 mph) and a submerged speed of 7.4 knots (13.7 km/h; 8.5 mph). When submerged, she could operate for 52 nautical miles (96 km; 60 mi) at 4 knots (7.4 km/h; 4.6 mph); when surfaced, she could travel 10,420 nautical miles (19,300 km; 11,990 mi) at 7 knots (13 km/h; 8.1 mph). UC-67 was fitted with six 100 centimetres (39 in) mine tubes, eighteen UC 200 mines, three 50 centimetres (20 in) torpedo tubes (one on the stern and two on the bow), seven torpedoes, and one 8.8 cm (3.5 in) Uk L/30 deck gun. Her complement was twenty-six crew members.

== Summary of raiding history ==
Date	Name	Nationality	Tonnage (Note: Merchant ship tonnages are in gross register tons. Military vessels are listed by tons displacement.)	Fate
17 March 1917	Primeira Flor D’Abril	Portugal	20	Sunk
17 March 1917	Restaurador	Portugal	25	Sunk
17 March 1917	Rita Segunda	Portugal	27	Sunk
17 March 1917	Senhora Do Rosario	Portugal	22	Sunk
18 March 1917	Victoria	Sweden	1,226	Sunk
25 March 1917	Queen Eugenie	United Kingdom	4,359	Sunk
26 April 1917	Chertsey	United Kingdom	3,264	Sunk
27 April 1917	Glencluny	United Kingdom	4,812	Sunk
27 April 1917	Karuma	United Kingdom	2,995	Sunk
23 May 1917	Elmmoor	United Kingdom	3,744	Sunk
26 May 1917	HMHS Dover Castle	Royal Navy	8,271	Sunk
14 June 1917	Lowther Castle	United Kingdom	4,439	Damaged
30 June 1917	Il Nuovo Gasperino Gabriele	Kingdom of Italy	35	Sunk
1 July 1917	Angela Madre	Kingdom of Italy	81	Sunk
1 July 1917	Miltiades Embiricos	Greece	3,448	Sunk
3 July 1917	City of Cambridge	United Kingdom	3,788	Sunk
7 July 1917	Milano	Kingdom of Italy	143	Sunk
7 July 1917	Southina	United Kingdom	3,506	Sunk
12 July 1917	Francesco	Kingdom of Italy	151	Sunk
12 July 1917	Leonardo G.	Kingdom of Italy	51	Sunk
14 August 1917	Lombardo	Kingdom of Italy	3,029	Sunk
17 August 1917	Madeleine III	French Navy	149	Damaged
18 August 1917	Politania	United Kingdom	3,133	Sunk
21 August 1917	Goodwood	United Kingdom	3,086	Sunk
23 August 1917	Fratelli Danieli	Kingdom of Italy	94	Sunk
4 October 1917	Stella	French Navy	216	Sunk
11 November 1917	Southgate	United Kingdom	3,661	Damaged
25 November 1917	Iniziativa	Kingdom of Italy	24	Sunk
1 December 1917	Phoebus	French Navy	Unknown	Sunk
2 December 1917	La Rance	France	2,610	Sunk
3 December 1917	Carmen	Kingdom of Italy	5,479	Sunk
5 December 1917	Greenwich	United Kingdom	2,938	Sunk
8 December 1917	La Vittoria	Kingdom of Italy	53	Sunk
20 January 1918	Faustina B.	Kingdom of Italy	105	Sunk
23 January 1918	Kerbihan	French Navy	195	Sunk
23 January 1918	La Drome	French Navy	3,236	Sunk
24 January 1918	Corse	French Navy	1,160	Sunk
26 January 1918	Ministro Iriondo	Argentina	1,753	Sunk
27 January 1918	Attilio	Kingdom of Italy	210	Sunk
28 January 1918	Urania	Kingdom of Italy	373	Sunk
29 January 1918	Giuseppe B.	Kingdom of Italy	39	Sunk
29 January 1918	Maria S.S. Del Paradiso	Kingdom of Italy	114	Sunk
10 February 1918	Romford	United Kingdom	3,035	Sunk
9 March 1918	Jolanda	Kingdom of Italy	187	Sunk
9 March 1918	Pasqualina	Kingdom of Italy	80	Sunk
11 March 1918	Tripoli	Kingdom of Italy	824	Sunk
14 March 1918	Jeanne	France	145	Sunk
15 March 1918	Armonia	Canada	5,226	Sunk
20 March 1918	Matteo Renato Imbriani	Kingdom of Italy	5,882	Sunk
22 March 1918	S. Giuseppe C.	Kingdom of Italy	53	Sunk
24 March 1918	Partenope	Regia Marina	834	Sunk
25 March 1918	Francesco Antonio Aiello	Kingdom of Italy	44	Sunk
25 March 1918	L’iniziatore	Kingdom of Italy	47	Sunk
26 March 1918	Elisabetha	Kingdom of Italy	45	Sunk
6 July 1918	Bertrand	United Kingdom	3,613	Sunk
7 September 1918	Bellbank	United Kingdom	3,250	Sunk
16 September 1918	G. Voyazides	Greece	3,040	Sunk
