= U28 =

U28 may refer to:

== Naval vessels ==
- German submarine U-28, various vessels
- HMS Wren (U28), a sloop of the Royal Navy
- SM U-28 (Austria-Hungary), a submarine of the Austro-Hungarian Navy

== Other uses ==
- Pilatus U-28A Draco, an American military aircraft
- Small nucleolar RNA SNORD28
- Truncated icosidodecahedron
- U 28, a regional railway route in Saxony
- The U-28 creature, an alleged sea monster sighted in the Celtic Sea
