= U25 =

U25 may refer to:

- German submarine U-25, various vessels
- HMS Scarborough (U25), a sloop of the Royal Navy
- Small nucleolar RNA SNORD25
- Truncated icosahedron
