= U26 =

U26 may refer to:

- German submarine U-26, various vessels
- SM U-26 (Austria-Hungary), a submarine of the Austro-Hungarian Navy
- Small nucleolar RNA SNORD26
- Truncated dodecahedron
