= List of shipwrecks in January 1918 =

The list of shipwrecks in January 1918 includes ships sunk, foundered, grounded, or otherwise lost during January 1918.

== 1 January ==
List of shipwrecks: 1 January 1918
Ship	State	Description
Egyptian Transport	United Kingdom	World War I: The cargo ship was damaged in the Mediterranean Sea by SM UB-50 (Imperial German Navy) with the loss of five of her crew. She was beached near Bône, Algeria. Later refloated, repaired and returned to service.
Eriksholm	Sweden	World War I: The cargo ship was torpedoed and sunk in the North Sea south of Aberdeen, United Kingdom (57°10′N 1°51′W) by SM UC-58 (Imperial German Navy).
E. S. Hocken	United Kingdom	The schooner was set afire and abandoned in the Atlantic Ocean. Her crew were rescued.
Sandon Hall	United Kingdom	World War I: The cargo ship was torpedoed and sunk in the Mediterranean Sea 22 nautical miles (41 km) north north east of Linosa, Italy (36°15′N 13°00′E) by SM U-40 (Austro-Hungarian Navy). Her crew survived.

== 2 January ==
List of shipwrecks: 2 January 1918
Ship	State	Description
Boston City	United Kingdom	World War I: The cargo ship was torpedoed and sunk in the Irish Sea 11 nautical miles (20 km) west of St. Ann's Head, Pembrokeshire (51°40′N 5°26′W) by SM U-91 (Imperial German Navy). Her crew survived.
Christos Markettos	Italy	World War I: The cargo ship was torpedoed and sunk in the Atlantic Ocean 4 nautical miles (7.4 km) north west of Gurnard's Head, Cornwall, United Kingdom (50°13′N 5°42′W) by SM U-95 (Imperial German Navy). Her crew survived.
Gallier	United Kingdom	World War I: The cargo ship was torpedoed and sunk in the Atlantic Ocean 7 nautical miles (13 km) east north east of the Wolf Rock, Cornwall (50°00′N 5°39′W) by SM U-95 (Imperial German Navy). Her crew survived.
HMS Hirpa	Royal Navy	The whaler was lost on this date.
HDMS Lossen	Royal Danish Navy	The minelayer ran aground near Omø. She was refloated on 19 February.
Nadejda	Russia	World War I: The cargo ship was sunk in the Irish Sea 25 nautical miles (46 km) south west of the Chicken Rock, Isle of Man by SM U-19 (Imperial German Navy). Her crew survived.
Veda	United Kingdom	World War I: The fishing smack was shelled and sunk in the Atlantic Ocean 30 nautical miles (56 km) south south west of the Eddystone Lighthouse by SM U-93 (Imperial German Navy). Her crew survived.

== 3 January ==
List of shipwrecks: 3 January 1918
Ship	State	Description
Allanton	United Kingdom	World War I: The collier was torpedoed and sunk in the Mediterranean Sea 20 nautical miles (37 km) north of Cape Bon, Algeria (37°26′N 11°00′E) by SM UB-50 (Imperial German Navy). Her crew survived.
Asborg	Norway	World War I: The cargo ship was torpedoed and sunk in the English Channel 3 nautical miles (5.6 km) south east by east of St. Catherine's Point, Isle of Wight (50°31′N 1°16′W) by SM UC-75 (Imperial German Navy). Her crew survived.
Birchwood	United Kingdom	World War I: The collier was torpedoed and sunk in the Atlantic Ocean 25 nautical miles (46 km) east of the Blackwater Lightship (United Kingdom) by SM U-61 (Imperial German Navy). Her crew survived.
HMS Blackwhale	Royal Navy	World War I: The patrol vessel struck a mine and sank in the North Sea off Fife Ness (56°19′N 0°45′W) with the loss of twelve of her crew.
Gartland	United Kingdom	World War I: The collier was torpedoed and sunk in the English Channel 5 nautical miles (9.3 km) east south east of the Owers Lightship (United Kingdom) by SM UB-30 (Imperial German Navy) with the loss of two of her crew.
Steelville	United Kingdom	World War I: The collier was torpedoed and sunk in the Mediterranean Sea 20 nautical miles (37 km) north of Cape Bon (37°25′N 11°06′E) by SM UB-50 (Imperial German Navy). Her crew survived.

== 4 January ==
List of shipwrecks: 4 January 1918
Ship	State	Description
Day Spring	United Kingdom	World War I: The fishing smack was scuttled in the English Channel 8 nautical miles (15 km) south east of Berry Head, Devon by SM UC-75 (Imperial German Navy). Her crew survived.
Goeland I	French Navy	World War I: The naval trawler was shelled and sunk in the Bay of Biscay off Penmarc'h, Finistère, France by SM U-93 (Imperial German Navy) with the loss of seven of her crew.
HMT Golden Sunset	Royal Navy	The naval trawler collided with another vessel and sank in the English Channel off the Shambles Lightship (United Kingdom).
Gratitude	United Kingdom	World War I: The fishing vessel was scuttled in the English Channel 8 nautical miles (15 km) south east of Berry Head by SM UC-75 (Imperial German Navy). Her crew survived.
Otto	United Kingdom	World War I: The schooner was shelled and sunk in the Irish Sea 10 nautical miles (19 km) south south west of St. John's Point, County Down (54°11′N 5°32′W) by SM U-91 (Imperial German Navy). Her crew survived.
Regina Elena	Italy	World War I: The passenger ship was sunk in the Mediterranean Sea off Tripoli, Libya by SM UC-20 (Imperial German Navy).
HMHS Rewa	United Kingdom	(Red Cross): World War I: The hospital ship was torpedoed and sunk in the Bristol Channel 19 nautical miles (35 km) west of Hartland Point, Devon (50°55′N 4°49′W) by SM U-55 (Imperial German Navy) with the loss of four of the 566 people on board.
Storebror	Norway	World War I: The neutral vessel was sunk by gunfire by SMS Wolf (Imperial German Navy) in the Atlantic Ocean (17°32′S 26°50′W) to prevent the ship from disclosing Wolf's position.
Varuna	United Kingdom	World War I: The fishing smack was scuttled in the English Channel 15 nautical miles (28 km) east south east of Berry Head by SM UC-75 (Imperial German Navy). Her crew survived.
Oldambt	Imperial German Navy	World War I: The German military supply ship was sunken in Suur Katel. It had been captured by UB-40 in 1916.

== 5 January ==
List of shipwrecks: 5 January 1918
Ship	State	Description
Birtley	United Kingdom	World War I: The cargo ship was torpedoed and sunk in the North Sea 8 nautical miles (15 km) north of Flamborough Head, Yorkshire by SM UB-38 (Imperial German Navy) with the loss of eighteen of her crew.
Ellenville	United States	The barge sank near Captains Island off Stamford, Connecticut.
Glenarm Head	United Kingdom	World War I: The cargo ship was torpedoed and sunk in the English Channel 5 nautical miles (9.3 km) west by south of the Brighton Lightship (50°34′N 0°12′W) by SM UB-30 (Imperial German Navy) with the loss of two of her crew.
Iolanthe	United Kingdom	World War I: The cargo ship was torpedoed and sunk in the English Channel 10 nautical miles (19 km) south east by east of Portland Bill, Dorset (50°28′N 2°12′W) by SM UC-75 (Imperial German Navy). Her crew survived.
Knightsgarth	United Kingdom	World War I: The collier was torpedoed and sunk in the Bristol Channel 5 nautical miles (9.3 km) west north west of the Bull Point Lighthouse, Devon by SM U-91 (Imperial German Navy) with the loss of two of her crew.
Rio Claro	United Kingdom	World War I: The cargo ship was torpedoed and sunk in the Gulf of Genoa 2 nautical miles (3.7 km) of Riva Trigoso, Liguria, Italy (44°13′N 9°29′E) by SM U-63 (Imperial German Navy). Her crew survived. The stern section of the ship was refloated in March 1919 and subsequently returned to service with a new bow.
Rose E. Hanley	United States	The canal boat sank at Glen Cove, New York.
Rose Marie	United Kingdom	World War I: The collier was torpedoed and sunk in the Atlantic Ocean 13 nautical miles (24 km) south east of the North Arklow Lightship (United Kingdom) by SM U-61 (Imperial German Navy) with the loss of a crew member.
War Baron	United Kingdom	World War I: The cargo ship was torpedoed and sunk in the Atlantic Ocean 8 nautical miles (15 km) north east of the Godrevy Lighthouse, Cornwall (50°18′N 5°35′W) by SM U-55 (Imperial German Navy) with the loss of two lives.

== 6 January ==
List of shipwrecks: 6 January 1918
Ship	State	Description
Dagny	Denmark	World War I: The cargo ship was torpedoed and sunk in the Bay of Biscay 4 nautical miles (7.4 km) south south west of Penmarc'h, Finistère, France by SM U-93 (Imperial German Navy) with the loss of two of her crew.
Halberdier	United Kingdom	World War I: The cargo ship was torpedoed and sunk in St George's Channel 27 nautical miles (50 km) west by north of Bardsey Island, Pembrokeshire by SM U-61 (Imperial German Navy) with the loss of five crew.
Harry Luckenbach	United States	World War I: The tanker was sunk in the Bay of Biscay 2 nautical miles (3.7 km) off Penmarc'h by SM U-93 (Imperial German Navy) with the loss of eight of her crew.
Henri Le Cour	France	World War I: The cargo ship was torpedoed and sunk in the Bay of Biscay 9 nautical miles (17 km) off Penmarc'h (47°45′N 4°28′W) by SM U-93 (Imperial German Navy).
Kanaris	Greece	World War I: The cargo ship was sunk in the Bay of Biscay off Penmarc'h (47°44′N 4°13′W) by SM U-93 (Imperial German Navy). Her crew survived.
Saint Mathieu	French Navy	World War I: The naval trawler was shelled and sunk in the Bay of Biscay off the Île d'Yeu, Vendée by SM U-22 (Imperial German Navy) with the loss of eight crew.
Spenser	United Kingdom	World War I: The cargo ship was torpedoed and sunk in the Atlantic Ocean 35 nautical miles (65 km) north east of the Tuskar Rock, Ireland by SM U-61 (Imperial German Navy). Her crew survived.

== 7 January ==
List of shipwrecks: 7 January 1918
Ship	State	Description
Arab	United Kingdom	World War I: The cargo ship was torpedoed and sunk in the Mediterranean Sea 18 nautical miles (33 km) north by east of Cape Serrat, Tunisia (37°28′N 9°23′E) by SM UB-50 (Imperial German Navy) with the loss of 21 of her crew.
Egda	Norway	World War I: The cargo ship was sunk in the Atlantic Ocean 15 nautical miles (28 km) off the Tuskar Rock, Ireland (52°14′N 5°40′W) by SM U-110 (Imperial German Navy) with the loss of a crew member.
Gascony	United Kingdom	World War I: The cargo ship was torpedoed and sunk in the English Channel 10 nautical miles (19 km) south south east of the Owers Lightship (United Kingdom) by SM UC-75 (Imperial German Navy). Her crew survived.
Leon	France	World War I: The cargo ship was sunk in the English Channel 13 nautical miles (24 km) north north east of the Triagoz Lighthouse, Finistère by SM UC-75 (Imperial German Navy). Her crew survived.
Olivette	United States	The steamer was wrecked near Havana, Cuba, a total loss.
Oued Sebou	France	World War I: The troopship was sunk in the Atlantic Ocean 4 nautical miles (7.4 km) off Cape Bojador, Río de Oro (26°30′N 14°17′W) by SM U-157 (Imperial German Navy). Her crew survived.
Premier	United Kingdom	World War I: The drifter was shelled and sunk 3 nautical miles (5.6 km) off Loch Eynort (57°13′N 6°28′W) by SM U-91 (Imperial German Navy) with the loss of two of her crew.
SM U-95	Imperial German Navy	World War I: The Type U 93 submarine was originally thought to have been lost in the English Channel off Hardelot, Pas-de-Calais, France after 15 January with the loss of all 36 crew. Following the examination of the propellers of a wreck off the Lizard Peninsula, Cornwall, divers found that it is this vessel and not SM U-93 (Imperial German Navy).

== 8 January ==
List of shipwrecks: 8 January 1918
Ship	State	Description
Lister Tief	Imperial German Navy	The Kattegat-class Vorpostenboot was wrecked on Hohes Reef off Borkum.
San Guglielmo	Italy	World War I: The passenger ship was sunk in the Gulf of Genoa off Loano, Liguria (44°07′N 8°18′E) by SM U-63 (Imperial German Navy).

== 9 January ==
List of shipwrecks: 9 January 1918
Ship	State	Description
Bayvoe	United Kingdom	World War I: The cargo ship was torpedoed and sunk in the Bay of Biscay 10 nautical miles (19 km) south of the Glénan Islands, Finistère, France (47°30′N 4°01′W) by SM U-84 (Imperial German Navy) with the loss of four of her crew.
HMS Racoon	Royal Navy	The Beagle-class destroyer was lost in the Atlantic Ocean off the Garvan Isles, County Donegal.
Taiyabi	India	The collier foundered in St George's Channel.
SM UB-69	Imperial German Navy	World War I: The Type UB III submarine was depth charged and sunk in the Mediterranean Sea off Bizerte, Algeria (37°30′N 10°38′E) with the loss of all 31 crew.
Ula	Norway	World War I: The coaster was torpedoed and sunk in the English Channel 10 nautical miles (19 km) east south east of The Lizard, Cornwall, United Kingdom (49°55′N 5°47′W) by SM U-55 (Imperial German Navy). Her crew survived.

== 10 January ==
List of shipwrecks: 10 January 1918
Ship	State	Description
Atlas	Netherlands	World War I: The cargo ship was sunk in the Atlantic Ocean 25 nautical miles (46 km) off Fuerteventura, Canary Islands, Spain (28°32′N 12°52′W) by SM U-156 (Imperial German Navy).
Cardiff	United Kingdom	World War I: The cargo ship was torpedoed and damaged in the Bay of Biscay 20 nautical miles (37 km) south west of Lorient, Morbihan, France by SM U-84 (Imperial German Navy) with the loss of eight of her crew. She was beached but was later refloated.
Hulda Maersk	Denmark	World War I: The cargo ship was scuttled in the Atlantic Ocean 24 nautical miles (44 km) off Cape Bojador, Río de Oro (26°26′N 14°28′W) by SM U-157 (Imperial German Navy). Her crew survived.
Portland	United Kingdom	The auxiliary schooner caught fire and sank in the Atlantic Ocean off the coast of Portugal. Her crew were rescued.
Ydun	Sweden	The schooner was abandoned in the North Sea off Stavanger, Rogaland, Norway. She came ashore at Ulboer, Rogaland and was wrecked.

== 11 January ==
List of shipwrecks: 11 January 1918
Ship	State	Description
A. B. Covington	United States	The tug was caught in an ice flow and crushed by ice in inland waters near Newport News, Virginia. The crew were rescued from the open boat after 36 hours.
Barsac	France	World War I: The cargo ship was sunk in the English Channel 18 nautical miles (33 km) north west of Cap de la Hève, Seine-Inférieure by SM UB-80 (Imperial German Navy).
HMML 356	Royal Navy	The motor launch was lost on this date.
Kasuga	Imperial Japanese Navy	The Kasuga-class cruiser ran aground in the Bangka Strait. She was refloated in June, repaired and returned to service.
Mereddio	United Kingdom	The steamer was sunk by SM U-84 (Imperial German Navy).

== 12 January ==
List of shipwrecks: 12 January 1918
Ship	State	Description
Adolph Meyer	Sweden	World War I: The coaster struck a mine and sank in the North Sea south east of Peterhead, Aberdeenshire, United Kingdom with the loss of all seventeen crew. Adolph Meyer was part of a convoy, but struggled to keep her position and disappeared from view.
Bosforo	Italy	World War I: The cargo ship was sunk in the Mediterranean Sea off Cape Spartivento, (37°54′N 16°06′E) by SM U-28 (Austro-Hungarian Navy). Her crew survived.
Château Laffite	France	World War I: The cargo ship was sunk in the Bay of Biscay 1.5 nautical miles (2.8 km) off Penmarc'h, Finistère (47°35′N 4°40′W) by SM U-84 (Imperial German Navy).
Mica	France	World War I: The cargo ship was torpedoed and sunk in the Aegean Sea 7 nautical miles (13 km) west of Milos, Greece (37°09′N 23°45′E) by SM U-47 (Austro-Hungarian Navy) with the loss of six of her crew.
HMS Narborough	Royal Navy	The Admiralty M-class destroyer ran aground on the Pentland Skerries and sank with the loss of all 92 crew.
HMS Opal	Royal Navy	The Admiralty M-class destroyer ran aground on the Pentland Skerries and sank with the loss of 96 of her 97 crew.
Whorlton	United Kingdom	World War I: The cargo ship was sunk in the English Channel off the Owers Lightship (United Kingdom) (50°34′N 0°45′W) by SM UB-30 (Imperial German Navy) with the loss of all thirteen crew.

== 13 January ==
List of shipwrecks: 13 January 1918
Ship	State	Description
SMS Fro	Imperial German Navy	The Vorpostenboot was lost on this date.
Kasuga	Imperial Japanese Navy	The Kasuga-class armored cruiser ran aground in the Banka Strait. She was salvaged in June and returned to service.
Rapallo	United Kingdom	World War I: The cargo ship was torpedoed and sunk in the Mediterranean Sea 1.5 nautical miles (2.8 km) south of Cape Peloro, Sicily, Italy (38°05′N 15°34′E) by SM U-28 (Austro-Hungarian Navy) with the loss of a crew member.

== 14 January ==
List of shipwrecks: 14 January 1918
Ship	State	Description
Alster	United Kingdom	World War I: The coaster was torpedoed and sunk in the North Sea 5 nautical miles (9.3 km) east south east of Noss Head, Shetland Islands by SM UB-62 (Imperial German Navy). Her crew survived.
Arthur Capel	France	World War I: The cargo ship was torpedoed and sunk in the English Channel 14 nautical miles (26 km) north west of Barfleur, Manche (49°52′N 0°47′W) by SM UB-80 (Imperial German Navy). Her crew survived.
Babin Chevaye	France	World War I: The barque was sunk in the Bay of Biscay 30 nautical miles (56 km) west south west of Penmarc'h, Finistère (47°36′N 5°07′W) by SM U-93 (Imperial German Navy). Her crew survived.
Centauro	Greece	The cargo ship ran aground at Estepona, Andalusia, Spain and was wrecked.
HMS G8	Royal Navy	The G-class submarine was lost in the North Sea on this date.
Miranda	United Kingdom	The trawler was wrecked in Pelwick Bay.
SM UB-63	Imperial German Navy	World War I: The Type UB III submarine departed for a patrol in the North Sea and Irish Sea. No further trace, lost with all 33 crew.

== 15 January ==
List of shipwrecks: 15 January 1918
Ship	State	Description
Bonanova	Spain	World War I: The coaster was damaged in the Mediterranean Sea 8 nautical miles (15 km) off Cape Farrara (43°11′N 4°37′E) by SM U-63 (Imperial German Navy). She was towed into Marseille, Bouches-du-Rhône, France where she was declared a constructive total loss.
HMT Ethnee	Royal Navy	The naval trawler was lost on this date.
HMML 278	Royal Navy	The motor launch was lost on this date.
Spital	United Kingdom	World War I: The cargo ship was torpedoed and sunk in the English Channel 28 nautical miles (52 km) south west by west of St Anthony Head, Cornwall by a Kaiserliche Marine submarine.
War Song	United Kingdom	World War I: The cargo ship was shelled and sunk in the Bay of Biscay 12 nautical miles (22 km) west of the Île de Sein, Finistère, France (48°02′N 5°10′W) by SM U-93 (Imperial German Navy) with the loss of sixteen of her crew.
Westpolder	Netherlands	World War I: The cargo ship struck a mine and sank in the North Sea west of Scheveningen, South Holland (52°11′N 3°57′E). Six of her eighteen crew were killed.

== 16 January ==
List of shipwrecks: 16 January 1918
Ship	State	Description
Genevieve	France	World War I: The cargo ship was torpedoed and sunk in the Atlantic Ocean 12 nautical miles (22 km) north west of St Ives, Cornwall, United Kingdom (50°23′N 5°20′W) by SM U-55 (Imperial German Navy).
HMT John E. Lewis	Royal Navy	World War I: The naval trawler struck a mine and sank in the North Sea off the Cork Lightship (United Kingdom) (51°54′N 1°24′E) with the loss of two of her crew.

== 17 January ==
List of shipwrecks: 17 January 1918
Ship	State	Description
Kingsdyke	United Kingdom	World War I: The cargo ship was torpedoed and sunk in the English Channel 20 nautical miles (37 km) north east by east of Cape Barfleur, Manche, France by SM UB-80 (Imperial German Navy) with the loss of sixteen of her crew.
Moama	Canada	The schooner sank at Woods Hole, Massachusetts.
Windsor Hall	United Kingdom	World War I: The cargo ship was torpedoed and sunk in the Mediterranean Sea 45 nautical miles (83 km) north west of Alexandria, Egypt by SM UB-66 (Imperial German Navy) with the loss of 27 crew. Her captain was taken as a prisoner of war.

== 18 January ==
List of shipwrecks: 18 January 1918
Ship	State	Description
HMS Blackcock	Royal Navy	The Admiralty tug ran aground near Tsip Navalock, Russia and was abandoned. She was later crushed by ice and sank.
Burgermeister Pauli	Imperial German Navy	The Greta-class Vorpostenboot was wrecked on Hohes Riff.
HMT Gambri	Royal Navy	World War I: The naval trawler struck a mine and sank in the English Channel 0.75 nautical miles (1,390 m) off the Royal Sovereign Lightship (United Kingdom) with the loss of 21 of her crew.
Maria P.	United Kingdom	World War I: The barquentine was shelled and sunk in the Mediterranean Sea 75 nautical miles (139 km) west of Cape Mannu, Sardinia, Italy (39°52′N 6°36′E) by SM U-63 (Imperial German Navy). Her crew survived.
SM UB-66	Imperial German Navy	World War I: German Type UB III submarine or U-boat in the Imperial German Navy was sunk by HMS Campanula (38°30′N 24°25′E) on 18 January 1918, 30 crew members died in the event.
Ville de Bordeaux	French Navy	World War I: The troopship was sunk in the Mediterranean Sea off Cape Caccia, Sardinia (40°29′N 6°49′E) by SM U-63 (Imperial German Navy) with the loss of eight lives.

== 19 January ==
List of shipwrecks: 19 January 1918
Ship	State	Description
Doggerbank	Imperial German Navy	World War I: The Gronland-class Vorpostenboot was sunk by mines west of Amrum.
HMS H10	Royal Navy	The H-class submarine was lost in the North Sea.
Trocas	United Kingdom	World War I: The tanker was torpedoed and sunk in the Aegean Sea 10 nautical miles (19 km) north east of the Skyro Lighthouse, Greece by SM UC-23 (Imperial German Navy) with the loss of 24 of her crew.
SM UB-22	Imperial German Navy	World War I: The Type UB II submarine struck a mine and sank in the Heligoland Bight (54°27′N 6°35′E) with the loss of all 22 crew.

== 20 January ==
List of shipwrecks: 20 January 1918
Ship	State	Description
SMS A73	Imperial German Navy	World War I: The A-class torpedo boat struck a mine and sank in the North Sea off Jutland, Denmark with the loss of 40 of her 57 crew.
SMS A77	Imperial German Navy	World War I: The A-class torpedo boat struck a mine and sank in the North Sea off Jutland with the loss of all 33 crew.
Faustina B.	Italy	World War I: The sailing vessel was sunk in the Mediterranean Sea east of Sardinia by SM UC-67 (Imperial German Navy).
Hirondelle	France	World War I: The sailing vessel was sunk in the English Channel north of Le Tréport, Seine-Inférieure by SM U-55 (Imperial German Navy).
HMS M28	Royal Navy	World War I: Battle of Imbros: The M15-class monitor was shelled and sunk by Midilli and Yavûz Sultân Selîm (both Ottoman Navy) with the loss of eleven of her 69 crew.
HMS Mechanician	Royal Navy	World War I: The escort ship was torpedoed and sunk in the English Channel 8 nautical miles (15 km) west of St. Catherine's Point, Isle of Wight by SM UB-35 (Imperial German Navy) with the loss of thirteen of her crew.
Midilli	Ottoman Navy	World War I: The Magdeburg-class cruiser struck five mines and sank in the Ionian Sea with the loss of 330 of her 492 crew.
HMS Raglan	Royal Navy	World War I: Battle of Imbros: The Abercrombie-class monitor was shelled and sunk by Midilli and Yavûz Sultân Selîm (both Ottoman Navy) with the loss of 127 of her 198 crew.
SMS S16	Imperial German Navy	World War I: The V1-class destroyer struck a mine and sank in the North Sea with the loss of 80 of her crew.
Warspite	Royal Navy	The training ship – formerly the ship-of-the-line HMS Waterloo (Royal Navy) – was destroyed by arson on the River Thames at Greenhithe, Kent, England.
Yavûz Sultân Selîm	Ottoman Navy	World War I: The Moltke-class battlecruiser struck three mines in the Aegean Sea and was beached at Nagara Point, in the Dardanelles. She was later repaired and returned to service.

== 21 January ==
List of shipwrecks: 21 January 1918
Ship	State	Description
Alice May	Australia	The cargo steamer was sunk in a hurricane off Mackay, Queensland.
Brinawarr	Australia	The cargo steamer was wrecked in a hurricane in the Pioneer River at Mackay, Queensland.
De Soto	United States	The paddle wheel passenger steamer was sunk by ice at Memphis, Tennessee.
Georgia Lee	United States	The paddle wheel passenger steamer was sunk by ice at Memphis, Tennessee.
HMS Louvain	Royal Navy	World War I: The armed boarding steamer was torpedoed and sunk in the Aegean Sea (37°38′N 24°10′E) by SM UC-22 (Imperial German Navy) with the loss of 227 lives.
Maria Caterina	Netherlands	World War I: The fishing vessel was shelled and sunk in the North Sea (52°47′N 3°28′E) by SM U-55 (Imperial German Navy) with the loss of all seven crew.
Ruth	United States	The paddle steamer was sunk by ice at McMechan, West Virginia. Her boilers were salvaged and placed in a new steamer.
Teelin Head	United Kingdom	World War I: The cargo ship was torpedoed and sunk in the English Channel 12 nautical miles (22 km) south south west of the Owers Lightship by SM UC-30 (Imperial German Navy) with the loss of thirteen of her crew.
West Wales	United Kingdom	World War I: The collier was torpedoed and sunk in the Mediterranean Sea 140 nautical miles (260 km) south east by south of Malta (34°00′N 16°50′E) by SM U-28 (Austro-Hungarian Navy) with the loss of two of her crew.

== 22 January ==
List of shipwrecks: 22 January 1918
Ship	State	Description
Andrea Costa	Italy	World War I: The cargo ship was torpedoed and sunk in the Mediterranean Sea off Malta by SM U-27 (Austro-Hungarian Navy).
Anglo-Canadian	United Kingdom	World War I: The cargo ship was torpedoed and sunk in the Mediterranean Sea 33 nautical miles (61 km) south of Malta (35°15′N 15°05′E) by SM U-63 (Imperial German Navy) with the loss of three crew.
B. Redican	United States	The barge sank at New Haven, Connecticut.
Greatham	United Kingdom	World War I: The cargo ship was torpedoed and sunk in the English Channel 3 nautical miles (5.6 km) south east of Dartmouth, Devon by SM UB-31 (Imperial German Navy) with the loss of seven crew.
Manchester Spinner	United Kingdom	World War I: The cargo ship was torpedoed and sunk in the Mediterranean Sea 33 nautical miles (61 km) south of Malta (35°15′N 15°05′E) by SM U-63 (Imperial German Navy). Her crew survived.
Molina	Norway	World War I: The cargo ship was sunk in the English Channel 3 nautical miles (5.6 km) west of St. Catherine's Point, Isle of Wight, United Kingdom (50°34′N 1°29′W) by SM UB-35 (Imperial German Navy). Her crew survived.
Serrana	United Kingdom	World War I: The cargo ship was torpedoed and sunk in the English Channel 10 nautical miles (19 km) west of St. Catherine's Point by SM UB-35 (Imperial German Navy) with the loss of five of her crew.
Victor De Chavarri	Spain	World War I: The cargo ship was torpedoed and sunk in the English Channel 7.5 nautical miles (13.9 km) north west of Cherbourg, Manche, France (49°48′N 1°45′W) by SM U-90 (Imperial German Navy).

== 23 January ==
List of shipwrecks: 23 January 1918
Ship	State	Description
Ålesund	Norway	World War I: The coaster was torpedoed and sunk in the English Channel 12 nautical miles (22 km) south west by west of St. Catherine's Point, Isle of Wight, United Kingdom (50°28′N 1°33′W) by SM UC-71 (Imperial German Navy) with the loss of six of her crew.
Birkhall	United Kingdom	World War I: The cargo ship was torpedoed and sunk in the Aegean Sea 4 nautical miles (7.4 km) south east of Cape Kafireas, Euboea, Greece by SM UC-23 (Imperial German Navy) with the loss of two of her crew.
Baykerran	United Kingdom	The cargo ship disappeared in the North Atlantic in a storm after sending a distress signal.
Kerbihan	French Navy	World War I: The naval trawler sank in the Mediterranean Sea between Pomègues and Cap Croisette, Bouches-du-Rhône (43°14′N 5°19′E) after striking a mine laid by SM UC-67 (Imperial German Navy).
La Drôme	French Navy	World War I: The supply ship sank in the Mediterranean Sea off Marseille, Bouches-du-Rhône (43°14′N 5°19′E) after striking a mine laid by SM UC-67 (Imperial German Navy) with the loss of 26 of her 60 crew.
Portaferry	United Kingdom	The coaster ran aground. She broke up on 3 March and was a total loss.

== 24 January ==
List of shipwrecks: 24 January 1918
Ship	State	Description
Aghia Arene	Greece	World War I: The sailing vessel was sunk in the Aegean Sea off Skyros (39°09′N 25°17′E) by SM UC-23 (Imperial German Navy).
Aghios Johannes	Greece	World War I: The sailing vessel was sunk in the Aegean Sea off Skyros (39°09′N 25°18′E) by SM UC-23 (Imperial German Navy).
Antonios J. Dracoulis	Greece	World War I: The cargo ship was sunk in the Mediterranean Sea off Alexandria, Egypt by SM U-33 (Imperial German Navy).
Apostoles Andreas	United Kingdom	World War I: The sailing vessel was shelled and sunk in the Mediterranean Sea off Alexandria by SM U-33 (Imperial German Navy).
Charles	United Kingdom	World War I: The schooner was shelled and sunk in the English Channel 16 nautical miles (30 km) south west of the Casquets, Channel Islands (49°30′N 2°45′W) by SM U-90 (Imperial German Navy) with the loss of one of her crew. Three survivors were taken as prisoners of war.
Corse	French Navy	World War I: The troopship was sunk at La Ciotat, Bouches-du-Rhône by SM UC-67 (Imperial German Navy). Her crew survived.
HMS Desire	Royal Navy	World War I: The naval tug was shelled and sunk in the North Sea 2.5 nautical miles (4.6 km) north east of Filey, Yorkshire (54°57′N 0°35′W) by SM UB-34 (Imperial German Navy) with the loss of ten of her crew.
Elsa	Norway	World War I: The cargo ship was sunk in the English Channel 5 nautical miles (9.3 km) east south east of Dartmouth, Devon, United Kingdom by SM UB-31 (Imperial German Navy). Her crew survived.
Fylgia	Sweden	World War I: The cargo ship was torpedoed and sunk in the North Sea 10 nautical miles (19 km) south east of Bell Rock (56°23′N 2°15′W) by SM UC-49 (Imperial German Navy) with the loss of three of her crew. Fylgia was part of the same convoy as Jönköping II.
Jönköping II	Sweden	World War I: The cargo ship was sunk in the North Sea 3 nautical miles (5.6 km) east north east of Bell Rock by SM UC-49 (Imperial German Navy). Her crew survived. Jönköping II was part of the same convoy as Fylgia. One casualty.
X6 and X110	Royal Navy	World War I: The barges were sunk in the North Sea 2.5 nautical miles (4.6 km) north east of Filey by SM UB-34 (Imperial German Navy) with the loss of six crew from X6.

== 25 January ==
List of shipwrecks: 25 January 1918
Ship	State	Description
Aghios Dimitrios	Greece	World War I: The sailing vessel was sunk in the Aegean Sea by SM UC-22 (Imperial German Navy).
Carignano	Italy	World War I: The cargo ship was sunk in the Tyrrhenian Sea off Stromboli (38°58′N 15°08′E) by SM UC-53 (Imperial German Navy).
Eastlands	United Kingdom	World War I: The cargo ship was torpedoed and sunk in the English Channel 13 nautical miles (24 km) north west of Île Vierge, Finistère, France by SM UB-55 (Imperial German Navy) with the loss of a crew member.
Folmina	Netherlands	World War I: The cargo ship was sunk in the North Sea 3 nautical miles (5.6 km) south east of Sunderland, County Durham, United Kingdom (55°00′N 1°20′W) by SM UB-34 (Imperial German Navy).
Giralda	Spain	World War I: The cargo ship was sunk in the Atlantic Ocean 30 nautical miles (56 km) off Cape Guardia (41°15′N 9°20′W) by SM U-152 (Imperial German Navy). Her crew were rescued by Cabo Meñor (Spain).
Giuseppe O.	Italy	World War I: The sailing vessel was sunk in the Tyrrhenian Sea east of Corsica by SM U-65 (Imperial German Navy).
Humber	United Kingdom	World War I: The coaster was torpedoed and sunk in the North Sea 2 nautical miles (3.7 km) east of Sunderland by SM UB-34 (Imperial German Navy) with the loss of seven crew.
Normandy	United Kingdom	World War I: The passenger ship was torpedoed and sunk in the English Channel 8 nautical miles (15 km) east by north of the Cap de La Hague, Manche, France (49°46′N 1°44′W) by SM U-90 (Imperial German Navy) with the loss of fourteen lives.

== 26 January ==
List of shipwrecks: 26 January 1918
Ship	State	Description
Asimina	Greece	World War I: The cargo ship was torpedoed and sunk in the Tyrrhenian Sea off Stromboli, Italy by SM UC-53 (Imperial German Navy).
Athos	Norway	World War I: The cargo ship was torpedoed and sunk in the North Sea 1 nautical mile (1.9 km) east north east of Kettleness, Yorkshire, United Kingdom by SM UB-34 (Imperial German Navy) with the loss of two of her crew.
Caterina	Italy	World War I: The sailing vessel was sunk in the Gulf of Genoa by SM UB-49 (Imperial German Navy).
Cork	United Kingdom	World War I: The passenger ship was torpedoed and sunk in the Irish Sea 9 nautical miles (17 km) north east of Point Lynas, Anglesey (53°34′N 4°14′W) by SM U-103 (Imperial German Navy) with the loss of twelve of the 35 people on board.
Figaro	France	World War I: On a voyage from Brest to Rouen carrying coal, the coaster was sunk, maybe by a mine, certainly after an explosion 3.5 nautical miles (6.5 km; 4.0 mi) south west of Les Hanois Lighthouse, west of Guernsey Channel Islands.
Germano	Portugal	World War I: The trawler was scuttled in the Atlantic Ocean off Cape Mondego (40°11′N 9°37′W) by SM U-152 (Imperial German Navy).
USS Guinevere	United States Navy	The patrol vessel ran aground in the Bay of Biscay and sank without loss of life.
Hartley	United Kingdom	World War I: The collier was torpedoed and sunk in the North Sea 2 nautical miles (3.7 km) north east of Skinningrove, Yorkshire (54°36′N 0°49′W) by SM UB-34 (Imperial German Navy). Her crew survived.
Louie Bell	United Kingdom	World War I: The schooner was scuttled in the English Channel 15 nautical miles (28 km) north of Cherbourg, Seine-Inférieure, France (49°53′N 1°44′W) by SM UB-58 (Imperial German Navy). Her crew survived.
May	United Kingdom	World War I: The ketch was scuttled in the English Channel 18 nautical miles (33 km) south east of Berry Head, Devon by SM UC-64 (Imperial German Navy). Her crew survived.
Ministro Yriondo	Argentina	World War I: The auxiliary schooner was sunk in the Mediterranean Sea off Toulon, Var, France (43°00′N 5°46′E) by SM UC-67 (Imperial German Navy). Her crew survived.
Rob Roy	United Kingdom	World War I: The schooner was shelled and sunk in the English Channel 20 nautical miles (37 km) south west of St. Catherine's Point, Isle of Wight (50°17′N 1°30′W) by SM UC-64 (Imperial German Navy). Her crew survived.
Serra do Gerez	Portugal	World War I: The trawler was scuttled in the Atlantic Ocean (40°04′N 9°36′W) by SM U-152 (Imperial German Navy). Her crew survived.
SM U-84	Imperial German Navy	World War I: The Type U 81 submarine was depth charged and sunk in St George's Channel (51°53′N 5°44′W) by USS PC-62 (United States Navy) with the loss of all 40 crew.
SM UB-35	Imperial German Navy	World War I: The Type UB II submarine was depth charged and sunk in the North Sea (51°03′N 1°46′E) by HMS Leven (Royal Navy) with the loss of 26 of her 28 crew.
Union	France	World War I: The coaster was sunk in the English Channel 7 nautical miles (13 km) north of Sept Îles, Côtes-du-Nord (48°58′N 3°30′W) by SM U-90 (Imperial German Navy).

== 27 January ==
List of shipwrecks: 27 January 1918
Ship	State	Description
RMS Andania	United Kingdom	World War I: The ocean liner was torpedoed and sunk in the Irish Sea off Rathlin Island, County Antrim (55°20′N 6°12′W) by SM U-46 (Imperial German Navy) with the loss of seven crew.
Attilio	Italy	World War I: The brigantine was scuttled in the Mediterranean Sea off the coast of Liguria by SM UC-67 (Imperial German Navy).
Carolus	Norway	World War I: The cargo ship was sunk in the English Channel 2 nautical miles (3.7 km) south of Dodman Point, Cornwall, United Kingdom (50°11′N 4°47′W) by SM UB-40 (Imperial German Navy). Her crew survived.
Free to the Core	Belgium	World War I: The fishing vessel was sunk in the English Channel (49°42′N 0°32′W) by SM UB-54 (Imperial German Navy).
Julia Frances	United States	World War I: The three-masted schooner was scuttled in the Atlantic Ocean 100 nautical miles (190 km) off Lisbon, Portugal (38°01′N 11°28′W) by SM U-152 (Imperial German Navy). Her crew survived.
Minnie	Canada	The brig was abandoned in the Bay of Biscay 15 nautical miles (28 km) off the Sisaragas Islands, Spain. Her crew were rescued.
Volonta di Dio	Italy	World War I: The sailing vessel was sunk in the Mediterranean Sea west of Sicily by SM UB-48 (Imperial German Navy).

== 28 January ==
List of shipwrecks: 28 January 1918
Ship	State	Description
Djibouti	France	World War I: The passenger ship was sunk in the Mediterranean Sea 8 nautical miles (15 km) off Cape Bengut, Algeria (37°06′N 3°55′E) by SM U-34 (Imperial German Navy).
HMS E14	Royal Navy	World War I: The E-class submarine was damaged by the premature explosion of one of her torpedoes. She was forced to surface and was sunk by coastal artillery off Kum Kale, Turkey with the loss of 21 of her 30 crew. The survivors were taken as prisoners of war.
Elsa	Italy	World War I: The barquentine was sunk in the Tyrrhenian Sea (41°23′N 12°37′E) by SM UB-49 (Imperial German Navy).
HMS Hazard	Royal Navy	The Dryad-class torpedo gunboat collided with Western Australia (United Kingdom) in the English Channel and sank.
HMML 55	Royal Navy	The motor launch was lost.
Ironton	United States	The paddle steamer was sunk by ice at Ironton, Ohio in the Ohio River. Raised and repaired.
Kong Sverre	United States	During a voyage in the Territory of Alaska from Craig to Hood Bay (57.3825°N 134.3986°W) with a crew of six and a cargo of 15 tons of lumber and provisions aboard, the 23-gross register ton fishing vessel was wrecked without loss of life during a gale on the northeastern tip of Warren Island in the Alexander Archipelago in Southeast Alaska.
Lysa	Italy	World War I: The brigantine was scuttled in the Mediterranean Sea east of Sardinia (40°44′N 9°50′E) by SM UB-49 (Imperial German Navy).
Neptuno	Portugal	World War I: The cargo ship was scuttled in the Atlantic Ocean 140 nautical miles (260 km) off Lisbon (37°12′N 11°37′W) by the submarine SM U-152 (Imperial German Navy). Her crew survived.
SM U-109	Imperial German Navy	World War I: The Type U 93 submarine struck a mine and sank in the English Channel (50°53′N 1°31′E with the loss of all 43 crew.
Urania	Italy	World War I: The sailing vessel was scuttled in the Mediterranean Sea south of Sardinia (40°15′N 10°26′E) by SM UC-67 (Imperial German Navy).
W. H. L.	United Kingdom	World War I: The ketch was scuttled in the English Channel 8 nautical miles (15 km) south south east of Portland Bill, Dorset by SM UB-58 (Imperial German Navy). Her crew survived.

== 29 January ==
List of shipwrecks: 29 January 1918
Ship	State	Description
Ada	Italy	World War I: The brigantine was scuttled in the Tyrrhenian Sea (41°20′N 12°40′E) by SM UB-49 (Imperial German Navy).
Addax	United Kingdom	World War I: The fishing vessel was shelled and sunk in the English Channel 14 nautical miles (26 km) south east by east of Berry Head, Devon (50°21′N 3°18′W) by SM UB-55 (Imperial German Navy). Her crew survived.
Butetown	United Kingdom	World War I: The collier was torpedoed and sunk in the English Channel 1.5 nautical miles (2.8 km) south of Dodman Point, Cornwall (50°12′N 4°48′W) by SM UB-40 (Imperial German Navy). Her crew survived.
De Julia	Belgium	World War I: The fishing vessel was sunk in Seine Bay (49°50′N 0°17′W) by SM UB-54 (Imperial German Navy).
De Twee Marcels	Belgium	World War I: The fishing vessel was sunk in Seine Bay (49°50′N 0°17′W) by SM UB-54 (Imperial German Navy) with the loss of four of her crew.
HMT Drumtochty	Royal Navy	World War I: The naval trawler struck a mine and sank in the English Channel with the loss of eleven of her thirteen crew.
Ethelinda	United Kingdom	World War I: The cargo ship was torpedoed and sunk in the Irish Sea 15 nautical miles (28 km) north north west of The Skerries, Isle of Anglesey (53°29′N 5°12′W) by SM UC-30 (Imperial German Navy) with the loss of 26 of her crew.
Fanny	Italy	World War I: The sailing vessel was sunk in the Gulf of Genoa by SM UB-49 (Imperial German Navy).
General Leman	United Kingdom	World War I: The fishing ketch was shelled and sunk in the English Channel 14 nautical miles (26 km) south east of Berry Head (50°21′N 3°10′W) by SM UB-55 (Imperial German Navy). Her crew survived.
Geo	United Kingdom	World War I: The cargo ship was torpedoed and sunk in the Mediterranean Sea 6 nautical miles (11 km) north by west of Cape Peloro, Sicily, Italy (38°19′N 15°38′E) by SM UC-53 (Imperial German Navy) with the loss of sixteen of her crew.
Giuseppe B.	Italy	World War I: The sailing vessel was sunk in the Mediterranean Sea west of Sicily by SM UC-67 (Imperial German Navy).
Glenfruin	United Kingdom	World War I: The cargo ship was sunk in the Irish Sea by SM U-103 (Imperial German Navy) with the loss of all 32 crew.
Guiana	United Kingdom	The tug was run down and sunk in the North Sea off Whitby, Yorkshire by HMS Bat (Royal Navy) with the loss of four of her crew.
H. Debra Huysseme	Belgium	World War I: The fishing vessel was sunk in the English Channel by SM UB-54 (Imperial German Navy).
Ibex	United Kingdom	World War I: The fishing smack was shelled and sunk in the English Channel 14 nautical miles (26 km) south east of Berry Head (50°21′N 3°10′W) by SM UB-55 (Imperial German Navy). Her crew survived.
Jean Mathilde	Belgium	World War I: The fishing vessel was sunk in Seine Bay (49°50′N 0°17′W) by SM UB-54 (Imperial German Navy). Her crew survived.
Le Jeune Arthur	Belgium	World War I: The fishing vessel was sunk in the English Channel by SM UB-54 (Imperial German Navy). Her crew survived.
Maria S.S. del Paradiso	Italy	World War I: The sailing vessel was sunk in the Mediterranean Sea west of Sicily by SM UC-67 (Imperial German Navy).
Marie	Belgium	World War I: The fishing vessel was sunk in Seine Bay (49°50′N 0°17′W) by SM UB-54 (Imperial German Navy). Her crew survived.
Montreal	Canada	The cargo ship collided with White Star Line ocean liner RMS Cedric (United Kingdom) in Liverpool Bay and was severely damaged. She sank two days later. Her crew were rescued.
Naha Maru	Japan	The passenger ship struck a rock and sank in the Bungo Strait off Shimonoseki with the loss of 36 lives.
Perriton	United Kingdom	World War I: The schooner was shelled and sunk in the English Channel 20 nautical miles (37 km) east of Berry Head by SM UB-55 (Imperial German Navy). Her crew survived.
Perseverance	United Kingdom	World War I: The fishing vessel was shelled and sunk in the English Channel 14 nautical miles (26 km) south east by east of Berry Head (50°21′N 3°10′W) by SM UB-55 (Imperial German Navy). Her crew survived.
Taxiarchis	United Kingdom	World War I: The sailing vessel was shelled and sunk in the Mediterranean Sea 100 nautical miles (190 km) south west of Cape Gala, Cyprus by SM U-33 (Imperial German Navy).
Tosho Maru	Japan	World War I: The cargo ship was sunk in the La Galita Channel by SM UC-54 (Imperial German Navy). Her crew survived.

== 30 January ==
List of shipwrecks: 30 January 1918
Ship	State	Description
Ange Gardien	France	World War I: The sailing vessel struck a mine and sank in the English Channel off Sept-Îles, Finistère.
Empress Ekaterina II	France	World War I: The passenger ship was torpedoed and sunk in the Mediterranean Sea north of Bougie, Algeria by SM UB-52 (Imperial German Navy). Her crew survived.
Ferryhill	United Kingdom	World War I: The coaster was shelled and sunk in the English Channel 15 nautical miles (28 km) west of Cap d'Antifer, Seine-Inférieure, France (49°40′N 1°11′W) by SM UB-54 (Imperial German Navy). Her crew survived.
Fratelli Barrera	Italy	World War I: The sailing vessel was sunk in the Mediterranean Sea off the coast of Italy by SM UC-53 (Imperial German Navy).
Harlaw	Italy	World War I: The coaster was sunk in the Mediterranean Sea 30 nautical miles (56 km) west north west of Corsica, France (43°02′N 8°30′E) by SM UB-48 (Imperial German Navy). Her crew survived.
Lindeskov	Denmark	World War I: The cargo ship was sunk in the Atlantic Ocean 6 nautical miles (11 km) west north west of Ouessant, Finistère (48°30′N 5°17′W) by SM U-90 (Imperial German Navy). Her crew survived.
Maizar	United Kingdom	World War I: The cargo ship was torpedoed and sunk in the Mediterranean Sea 38 nautical miles (70 km) north by west of Cap Ferrat, Algeria (36°32′N 1°00′W) by SM U-34 (Imperial German Navy). Her crew survived.
Michele Padre	Italy	World War I: The sailing vessel was sunk in the Mediterranean Sea (39°15′N 15°11′E) by SM UC-53 (Imperial German Navy).
Minnetonka	United Kingdom	World War I: The passenger ship was torpedoed and sunk in the Mediterranean Sea 40 nautical miles (74 km) east north east of Malta by SM U-64 (Imperial German Navy) with the loss of four lives. Ten survivors were taken as prisoners of war.
Princess	United States	The excursion steamer was sunk by ice at Carrollton, Kentucky. Raised and rebuilt.
SMS Senator Westphal	Imperial German Navy	The Vorpostenboot was lost on this date.
HMS Wellholme	Royal Navy	World War I: The Q-ship was shelled and sunk in the English Channel south west of Portland Bill, Dorset by SM UB-55 (Imperial German Navy) with the loss of three of her crew.

== 31 January ==
List of shipwrecks: 31 January 1918
Ship	State	Description
Elephant	French Navy	World War I: The auxiliary patrol vessel was torpedoed and sunk in the English Channel north of the Île-de-Bréhat, Finistère (48°53′N 3°00′W) by SM UC-79 (Imperial German Navy) with the loss of fifteen of her crew.
HMS K4	Royal Navy	Operation E.C.1: The K-class submarine collided with HMS K6 and HMS K7 (both Royal Navy) in the Firth of Forth and sank with the loss of all 59 crew.
HMS K17	Royal Navy	Operation E.C.1: The K-class submarine collided with HMS Fearless (Royal Navy) in the Firth of Forth and sank with the loss of all 59 crew.
Martin Gust	Russia	World War I: The sailing vessel was shelled and sunk in the Atlantic Ocean off Ouessant, Finistère, France by SM U-90 (Imperial German Navy).
Towneley	United Kingdom	World War I: The collier was torpedoed and sunk in the Atlantic Ocean 18 nautical miles (33 km) off Trevose Head, Cornwall (50°48′N 4°48′W) by SM U-46 (Imperial German Navy) with the loss of six crew.

== Unknown date ==
List of shipwrecks: Unknown date 1918
Ship	State	Description
Lavoro	Italy	World War I: The sailing vessel was sunk in the Gulf of Genoa between 26 and 31 January by SM UB-49 (Imperial German Navy).
Lucia Martini	Italy	World War I: The sailing vessel was sunk in the Gulf of Genoa between 26 and 31 January by SM UB-49 (Imperial German Navy).
Paola Meriga	Italy	World War I: The sailing vessel was sunk in the Gulf of Genoa between 26 and 31 January by SM UB-49 (Imperial German Navy).
Stamboul	Germany	The cargo ship foundered in the Black Sea in early January.
SM U-93	Imperial German Navy	World War I: The Type U 93 submarine was lost in the English Channel off Hardelot, France, sometime after 15 January, with the loss of all 39 crew. After examining the propellers of a wreck off the Lizard Peninsula, Cornwall, divers found that it is SM U-95 (Imperial German Navy) and not, as was originally thought, SM U-93.
SM UB-66	Imperial German Navy	World War I: The Type UB III submarine was lost in the Mediterranean Sea on or after 17 January with the loss of all 30 crew.
W. C. McKay	United Kingdom	World War I: The sailing vessel was sunk in the Atlantic Ocean off the Azores, Portugal by a Kaiserliche Marine submarine with the loss of six of her crew.
