= SM U-28 =

SM U-28 may refer to:

- SM U-28 (Germany), a Type U 27 submarine launched in 1913 and sunk in 1917
- SM U-28 (Austria-Hungary), a U-27-class submarine of the Austro-Hungarian Navy

== See also ==
- German submarine U-28, a list of German submarines named U-28
