= U31 =

U31 may refer to:

== Naval vessels ==
- Brazilian destroyer escort Bracuí (U-31)
- German submarine U-31, various vessels
- SM U-31 (Austria-Hungary), a submarine of the Austro-Hungarian Navy

== Other uses ==
- Nissan Presage (U31), a Japanese minivan
- Small icosicosidodecahedron
- Small nucleolar RNA SNORD31
