= German submarine U-25 =

U-25 may refer to one of the following German submarines:

- SM U-25, was a Type U 23 submarine launched in 1913 and that served in the First World War until surrendered on 23 February 1919
  - During the First World War, Germany also had these submarines with similar names:
    - SM UB-25, a Type UB II submarine launched in 1915 and surrendered on 26 November 1918
    - SM UC-25, a Type UC II submarine launched in 1916 and scuttled on 28 October 1918
- German submarine U-25 (1936), a Type IA submarine that served in the Second World War until lost in August 1940
- German submarine U-25 (S174), a Type 206 submarine of the Bundesmarine that was launched in 1974; no longer in service
