= SM UC-75 =

German Type UC II minelaying U-boat

Coordinates: 53°57′N 0°9′E

History

German Empire
- Name: UC-75
- Ordered: 12 January 1916
- Builder: AG Vulcan, Hamburg
- Yard number: 80
- Launched: 6 November 1916
- Commissioned: 6 December 1916
- Fate: Rammed and sunk, 31 May 1918

General characteristics
- Class & type: Type UC II submarine
- Displacement: 410 t (400 long tons), surfaced; 493 t (485 long tons), submerged
- Length: 50.45 m (165 ft 6 in) o/a; 40.30 m (132 ft 3 in) pressure hull
- Beam: 5.22 m (17 ft 2 in) o/a; 3.65 m (12 ft) pressure hull
- Draught: 3.65 m (12 ft)
- Propulsion: 2 × propeller shafts; 2 × 6-cylinder, 4-stroke diesel engines, 580–600 PS (430–440 kW; 570–590 shp); 2 × electric motors, 620 PS (460 kW; 610 shp)
- Speed: 11.8 knots (21.9 km/h; 13.6 mph), surfaced; 7.3 knots (13.5 km/h; 8.4 mph), submerged
- Range: 8,660–10,230 nmi (16,040–18,950 km; 9,970–11,770 mi) at 7 knots (13 km/h; 8.1 mph) surfaced; 52 nmi (96 km; 60 mi) at 4 knots (7.4 km/h; 4.6 mph) submerged
- Test depth: 50 m (160 ft)
- Complement: 26
- Armament: 6 × 100 cm (39.4 in) mine tubes; 18 × UC 200 mines; 3 × 50 cm (19.7 in) torpedo tubes (2 bow/external; one stern); 7 × torpedoes; 1 × 8.8 cm (3.5 in) Uk L/30 deck gun
- Notes: 30-second diving time

Service record
- Part of: I Flotilla; 10 February – 5 August 1917; Flandern / Flandern II Flotilla; 5 August 1917 – 31 May 1918
- Commanders: Kptlt. Georg Paech; 6 December 1916 – 16 March 1917; Oblt.z.S. Johannes Lohs; 17 March 1917 – 30 January 1918; Oblt.z.S. Walter Schmitz; 31 January – 31 May 1918
- Operations: 13 patrol
- Victories: 55 merchant ships sunk (82,683 GRT); 2 warships sunk (1,555 tons); 2 auxiliary warship sunk (260 GRT); 8 merchant ships damaged (40,021 GRT); 2 auxiliary warship damaged (426 GRT)

SM UC-75 was a German Type UC II minelaying submarine or U-boat in the German Imperial Navy (German: Kaiserliche Marine) during World War I. The U-boat was ordered on 12 January 1916 and was launched on 6 November 1916. She was commissioned into the German Imperial Navy on 6 December 1916 as SM UC-75. (Note: "SM" stands for "Seiner Majestät" (English: His Majesty's) and combined with the U for Unterseeboot would be translated as His Majesty's Submarine.) In 13 patrols UC-75 was credited with sinking 59 ships, either by torpedo or by mines laid. UC-75 rammed and sunk by HMS Fairy on 31 May 1918 with 17 dead and 14 survivors. HMS Fairy had sustained heavy damage and sank a short time later.

== Design ==
A Type UC II submarine, UC-75 had a displacement of 410 tonnes (400 long tons) when at the surface and 493 tonnes (485 long tons) while submerged. She had a length overall of 50.45 m (165 ft 6 in), a beam of 5.22 m (17 ft 2 in), and a draught of 3.65 m (12 ft). The submarine was powered by two six-cylinder four-stroke diesel engines each producing 290–300 metric horsepower (210–220 kW; 290–300 shp) (a total of 580–600 metric horsepower (430–440 kW; 570–590 shp)), two electric motors producing 620 metric horsepower (460 kW; 610 shp), and two propeller shafts. She had a dive time of 30 seconds and was capable of operating at a depth of 50 metres (160 ft).

The submarine had a maximum surface speed of 11.8 knots (21.9 km/h; 13.6 mph) and a submerged speed of 7.3 knots (13.5 km/h; 8.4 mph). When submerged, she could operate for 52 nautical miles (96 km; 60 mi) at 4 knots (7.4 km/h; 4.6 mph); when surfaced, she could travel 8,660 to 10,230 nautical miles (16,040 to 18,950 km; 9,970 to 11,770 mi) at 7 knots (13 km/h; 8.1 mph). UC-75 was fitted with six 100-centimetre (39 in) mine tubes, eighteen UC 200 mines, three 50-centimetre (20 in) torpedo tubes (one on the stern and two on the bow), seven torpedoes, and one 8.8 cm (3.5 in) Uk L/30 deck gun. Her complement was twenty-six crew members.

== Summary of raiding history ==
Date	Name	Nationality	Tonnage (Note: Merchant ship tonnages are in gross register tons. Military vessels are listed by tons displacement.)	Fate
25 March 1917	Industria	United Kingdom	133	Sunk
25 March 1917	Marshall	Norway	1,123	Sunk
25 March 1917	Median	United Kingdom	214	Sunk
25 March 1917	Rosslyn	United Kingdom	113	Sunk
28 March 1917	Expedient	United Kingdom	145	Sunk
29 March 1917	Schaldis	Belgium	1,241	Sunk
1 May 1917	Alide	Russian Empire	175	Sunk
3 May 1917	Carberry King	United Kingdom	31	Sunk
3 May 1917	Eleanor	United Kingdom	31	Sunk
3 May 1917	Fastnet	United Kingdom	31	Sunk
3 May 1917	Hibernia	United Kingdom	21	Sunk
3 May 1917	Lucky Lass	United Kingdom	10	Sunk
3 May 1917	North Star	United Kingdom	15	Sunk
3 May 1917	Sir Edward Birkbeck	United Kingdom	23	Sunk
4 May 1917	Marie	France	133	Sunk
5 May 1917	HMS Lavender	Royal Navy	1,200	Sunk
6 May 1917	President	France	354	Sunk
15 May 1917	Polymnia	United Kingdom	2,426	Sunk
7 June 1917	Wilhelm	United Kingdom	187	Sunk
11 June 1917	Anglian	United Kingdom	5,532	Sunk
12 June 1917	HMS Prize	Royal Navy	199	Damaged
18 June 1917	Kathlamba	United Kingdom	6,382	Damaged
19 June 1917	Kelso	United Kingdom	1,292	Sunk
20 June 1917	Benita	United Kingdom	130	Sunk
20 June 1917	Bidartaise	France	123	Sunk
29 July 1917	Saint Marcouf	France	1,117	Sunk
1 August 1917	Karina	United Kingdom	4,222	Sunk
3 August 1917	Beechpark	United Kingdom	4,763	Sunk
3 August 1917	HMS Mary B. Mitchell	Royal Navy	227	Damaged
25 August 1917	Cymrian	United Kingdom	1,014	Sunk
29 August 1917	Cooroy	United Kingdom	2,470	Sunk
29 August 1917	Lynburn	United Kingdom	587	Sunk
28 September 1917	William Middleton	United Kingdom	2,543	Damaged
9 October 1917	Main	United Kingdom	715	Sunk
12 October 1917	W. M. Barkley	United Kingdom	569	Sunk
13 October 1917	Eskmere	United Kingdom	2,293	Sunk
19 October 1917	Hazelwood	United Kingdom	3,120	Sunk
3 November 1917	HMD Deliverer	Royal Navy	79	Sunk
3 November 1917	Atlantian	United Kingdom	9,399	Damaged
4 November 1917	Longwy	France	2,315	Sunk
8 November 1917	The Marquis	United Kingdom	373	Sunk
1 December 1917	Euphorbia	United Kingdom	3,109	Sunk
1 December 1917	Rydal Hall	United Kingdom	3,314	Sunk
4 December 1917	Milton	United Kingdom	3,267	Damaged
7 December 1917	Earl Of Elgin	United Kingdom	4,448	Sunk
28 December 1917	Alfred H. Read	United Kingdom	457	Sunk
28 December 1917	Chirripo	United Kingdom	4,050	Sunk
3 January 1918	Asborg	Norway	2,750	Sunk
4 January 1918	Day Spring	United Kingdom	39	Sunk
4 January 1918	Gratitude	United Kingdom	40	Sunk
4 January 1918	Varuna	United Kingdom	40	Sunk
5 January 1918	Iolanthe	United Kingdom	3,081	Sunk
6 January 1918	Arca	United Kingdom	4,839	Damaged
7 January 1918	Gascony	United Kingdom	3,133	Sunk
7 January 1918	Leon	France	2,401	Sunk
5 March 1918	Edouard Marie	Belgium	32	Sunk
9 March 1918	Marguerite	United Kingdom	10	Sunk
10 March 1918	Sunrise	United Kingdom	56	Sunk
10 March 1918	Wave	United Kingdom	47	Sunk
13 March 1918	Arno Mendi	Spain	2,827	Sunk
14 March 1918	Tweed	United Kingdom	1,777	Sunk
17 March 1918	Eliza Anne	United Kingdom	36	Sunk
18 March 1918	Navigator	United Kingdom	3,803	Damaged
28 March 1918	Dryden	United Kingdom	5,839	Damaged
16 April 1918	Hungerford	United Kingdom	5,811	Sunk
19 April 1918	War Helmet	United Kingdom	8,184	Sunk
12 May 1918	Benlawers	United Kingdom	3,949	Damaged
29 May 1918	HMT Dirk	Royal Navy	181	Sunk
31 May 1918	HMS Fairy	Royal Navy	355	Sunk
