= SM UB-26 =

Coordinates: 49°28′N 0°2′E

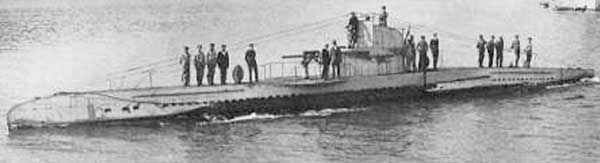
- SM UB-45, a U-boat similar to UB-26

History

German Empire
- Name: UB-26
- Ordered: 30 April 1915
- Builder: AG Weser, Bremen
- Cost: 1,291,000 German Papiermark
- Yard number: 240
- Laid down: 30 June 1915
- Launched: 14 December 1915
- Commissioned: 27 December 1915
- Fate: Sunk in Le Havre harbour 5 April 1916

France
- Name: Roland Morillot
- Namesake: Roland Morillot
- Acquired: 30 August 1917
- Decommissioned: 21 January 1925
- Fate: Broken up after testing in 1931

General characteristics
- Class & type: Type UB II submarine
- Displacement: 265 t (261 long tons) surfaced; 291 t (286 long tons) submerged
- Length: 36.13 m (118 ft 6 in) o/a; 27.13 m (89 ft) pressure hull
- Beam: 4.36 m (14 ft 4 in) o/a; 3.85 m (13 ft) pressure hull
- Draught: 3.66 m (12 ft)
- Propulsion: 1 × propeller shaft; 2 × four-stroke 6-cylinder diesel engine, 284 PS (209 kW; 280 bhp); 2 × electric motor, 280 PS (210 kW; 280 shp)
- Speed: 9.15 knots (16.95 km/h; 10.53 mph) surfaced; 5.81 knots (10.76 km/h; 6.69 mph) submerged
- Range: 7,200 nautical miles (13,300 km; 8,300 mi) at 5 knots (9.3 km/h; 5.8 mph) surfaced; 45 nmi (83 km; 52 mi) at 4 knots (7.4 km/h; 4.6 mph) submerged
- Test depth: 50 m (160 ft)
- Complement: 2 officers, 21 men
- Armament: 2 × 50 cm (19.7 in) torpedo tubes; 4 × torpedoes (later 6); 1 × 5 cm SK L/40 gun
- Notes: 30-second diving time

Service record
- Part of: Flanders Flotilla; 21 March – 5 April 1916
- Commanders: Oblt.z.S. Wilhelm Smiths; 7 January – 5 April 1916
- Operations: 2 patrols
- Victories: None

SM UB-26 was a German Type UB II submarine or U-boat in the German Imperial Navy (German: Kaiserliche Marine) during World War I. The U-boat was ordered on 30 April 1915 and launched on 14 December 1915. She was commissioned into the German Imperial Navy on 27 December 1915 as SM UB-26. (Note: "SM" stands for "Seiner Majestät" (English: His Majesty's) and combined with the U for Unterseeboot would be translated as His Majesty's Submarine.) UB-26 was trapped in anti-submarine nets trailed by the Trombe and was scuttled in Le Havre harbour on 5 April 1916. She was raised by the French on 30 August 1917 and served as Roland Morillot.

On 23 October 1922, Roland Morillot sprang a leak and was abandoned in the English Channel west of Guernsey, Channel Islands. Her crew were rescued by the French ship Daphne. Roland Morillot was subsequently towed into Cherbourg, France by the French tug Centaure.

Roland Morillot was repaired and remained in service until 21 January 1925. She then was used in tests before finally being broken up in Cherbourg in 1935.

== Design ==
A Type UB II submarine, UB-26 had a displacement of 265 tonnes (261 long tons) when at the surface and 291 tonnes (286 long tons) while submerged. She had a total length of 36.13 m (118 ft 6 in), a beam of 4.36 m (14 ft 4 in), and a draught of 3.66 m (12 ft 0 in). The submarine was powered by two Daimler six-cylinder diesel engines producing a total 270 metric horsepower (270 shp; 200 kW), two Siemens-Schuckert electric motors producing 280 metric horsepower (210 kW; 280 shp), and one propeller shaft. She was capable of operating at depths of up to 50 metres (160 ft).

The submarine had a maximum surface speed of 8.9 knots (16.5 km/h; 10.2 mph) and a maximum submerged speed of 5.72 knots (10.59 km/h; 6.58 mph). When submerged, she could operate for 45 nautical miles (83 km; 52 mi) at 4 knots (7.4 km/h; 4.6 mph); when surfaced, she could travel 7,200 nautical miles (13,300 km; 8,300 mi) at 5 knots (9.3 km/h; 5.8 mph). UB-26 was fitted with two 50 centimetres (20 in) torpedo tubes, four torpedoes, and one 5 cm (2.0 in) SK L/40 deck gun. She had a complement of twenty-one crew members and two officers and a thirty-second dive time.

== Bibliography ==
- Bendert, Harald (2000). Die UB-Boote der Kaiserlichen Marine, 1914-1918. Einsätze, Erfolge, Schicksal (in German). Hamburg: Verlag E.S. Mittler & Sohn GmbH. ISBN 3-8132-0713-7.
- Gröner, Erich; Jung, Dieter; Maass, Martin (1991). U-boats and Mine Warfare Vessels. German Warships 1815–1945. Vol. 2. Translated by Thomas, Keith; Magowan, Rachel. London: Conway Maritime Press. ISBN 0-85177-593-4.
- Rössler, Eberhard (1979). Die deutschen U-Boote und ihre Werften: eine Bilddokumentation über den deutschen U-Bootbau; in zwei Bänden (in German). Vol. I. Munich: Bernard & Graefe. ISBN 3-7637-5213-7.
