= SS Normandy =

History

France
- Name: SS Normandy
- Operator: 1910–1912: London, Brighton and South Coast Railway; 1912–1918: London and South Western Railway
- Port of registry: (United Kingdom)
- Builder: Earle's Shipbuilding, Hull
- Launched: 12 May 1910
- Fate: Torpedoed and sunk 25 January 1918

General characteristics
- Tonnage: 618 gross register tons (GRT)
- Length: 192 feet (59 m)
- Beam: 29.2 feet (8.9 m)
- Draught: 14.1 feet (4.3 m)

SS Normandy was a passenger vessel built for the London, Brighton and South Coast Railway in 1910.

== History ==
She was built by Earle’s Shipbuilding in Hull and launched on 12 May 1910 and christened Normandy by Mrs. Funnell.

She was sold by the London, Brighton and South Coast Railway to the London and South Western Railway in 1912.

The passenger ship was torpedoed and sunk on 25 January 1918 in the English Channel 8 nautical miles (15 km) east by north of the Cap de La Hague, Manche, France (49°46′N 1°44′W) by SM U-90 with the loss of fourteen lives.
