= SM UB-28 =

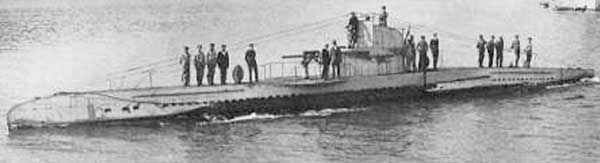
- SM UB-45, a U-boat similar to UB-28

History

German Empire
- Name: UB-28
- Ordered: 30 April 1915
- Builder: AG Weser, Bremen
- Cost: 1,291,000 German Papiermark
- Yard number: 242
- Laid down: 12 July 1915
- Launched: 20 December 1915
- Commissioned: 27 December 1915
- Fate: Surrendered 24 November 1918

General characteristics y
- Class & type: Type UB II submarine
- Displacement: 265 t (261 long tons) surfaced; 291 t (286 long tons) submerged
- Length: 36.13 m (118 ft 6 in) o/a; 27.13 m (89 ft) pressure hull
- Beam: 4.36 m (14 ft 4 in) o/a; 3.85 m (13 ft) pressure hull
- Draught: 3.66 m (12 ft)
- Propulsion: 1 × propeller shaft; 2 × 6-cylinder diesel engine, 270 PS (200 kW; 270 bhp); 2 × electric motor, 280 PS (210 kW; 280 shp)
- Speed: 8.90 knots (16.48 km/h; 10.24 mph) surfaced; 5.72 knots (10.59 km/h; 6.58 mph) submerged
- Range: 7,200 nmi (13,300 km; 8,300 mi) at 5 knots (9.3 km/h; 5.8 mph) surfaced; 45 nmi (83 km; 52 mi) at 4 knots (7.4 km/h; 4.6 mph) submerged
- Test depth: 50 m (160 ft)
- Complement: 2 officers, 21 men
- Armament: 2 × 50 cm (19.7 in) torpedo tubes; 4 × torpedoes (later 6); 1 × 5 cm SK L/40 gun
- Notes: 30-second diving time

Service record
- Commanders: Oblt.z.S. Ernst Rosenow; 27 December 1915 – 13 January 1916
- Operations: No patrols
- Victories: None

SM UB-28 was a German Type UB II submarine or U-boat in the German Imperial Navy (German: Kaiserliche Marine) during World War I. The U-boat was ordered on 30 April 1915 and launched on 20 December 1915. She was commissioned into the German Imperial Navy on 27 December 1915 as SM UB-28. (Note: "SM" stands for "Seiner Majestät" (English: His Majesty's) and combined with the U for Unterseeboot would be translated as His Majesty's Submarine.)

UB-28 was surrendered to Britain in accordance with the requirements of the Armistice with Germany on 24 November 1918. She was ultimately broken up at Bo'ness in 1919-20.

== Design ==
A Type UB II submarine, UB-28 had a displacement of 265 tonnes (261 long tons) when at the surface and 291 tonnes (286 long tons) while submerged. She had a total length of 36.13 m (118 ft 6 in), a beam of 4.36 m (14 ft 4 in), and a draught of 3.66 m (12 ft). The submarine was powered by two Benz six-cylinder diesel engines producing a total 267 metric horsepower (263 shp; 196 kW), two Siemens-Schuckert electric motors producing 280 metric horsepower (210 kW; 280 shp), and one propeller shaft. She was capable of operating at depths of up to 50 metres (160 ft).

The submarine had a maximum surface speed of 8.9 knots (16.5 km/h; 10.2 mph) and a maximum submerged speed of 5.72 knots (10.59 km/h; 6.58 mph). When submerged, she could operate for 45 nautical miles (83 km; 52 mi) at 4 knots (7.4 km/h; 4.6 mph); when surfaced, she could travel 7,200 nautical miles (13,300 km; 8,300 mi) at 5 knots (9.3 km/h; 5.8 mph). UB-28 was fitted with two 50 centimetres (20 in) torpedo tubes, four torpedoes, and one 5 cm (2.0 in) SK L/40 deck gun. She had a complement of twenty-one crew members and two officers and a thirty-second dive time.

== Bibliography ==
- Bendert, Harald (2000). Die UB-Boote der Kaiserlichen Marine, 1914-1918. Einsätze, Erfolge, Schicksal (in German). Hamburg: Verlag E.S. Mittler & Sohn GmbH. ISBN 3-8132-0713-7.
- Gröner, Erich; Jung, Dieter; Maass, Martin (1991). U-boats and Mine Warfare Vessels. German Warships 1815–1945. Vol. 2. Translated by Thomas, Keith; Magowan, Rachel. London: Conway Maritime Press. ISBN 0-85177-593-4.
- Rössler, Eberhard (1979). Die deutschen U-Boote und ihre Werften: eine Bilddokumentation über den deutschen U-Bootbau; in zwei Bänden (in German). Vol. I. Munich: Bernard & Graefe. ISBN 3-7637-5213-7.
