= SS Eskmere =

History
- Name: Thirlmere; Eskmere
- Owner: Watson Steamship Co. (1916); Bromport Steamship Co. (1916–1917)
- Port of registry: (United Kingdom) Liverpool
- Builder: North of Ireland Shipbuilding Co., Derry, Ireland
- Launched: 10 April 1916
- Completed: 11 July 1916
- Identification: Official number: 137514
- Fate: Sunk by submarine, 13 October 1917

General characteristics
- Type: Freighter
- Tonnage: 2,293 gross register tons (GRT); 1,216 net register tons (NRT)
- Length: 287.2 ft (87.5 m)
- Beam: 40.6 ft (12.4 m)
- Draught: 22.8 ft (6.9 m)
- Installed power: 158 nhp; 1,250 ihp (930 kW)
- Propulsion: 1 screw propeller; 1 triple-expansion steam engine
- Speed: 10 knots (19 km/h; 12 mph)

SS Eskmere was a small freighter built during the First World War. Completed in 1916, she was intended for the West African trade. The ship was sunk by the German submarine SM UC-75 in October 1917 with the loss of 20 crewmen.

== Description ==
Eskmere had an overall length of 287.2 feet (87.5 m), with a beam of 40.6 feet (12.4 m) and a draught of 22.8 feet (6.9 m). The ship was assessed at 2,293 gross register tons (GRT) and 1,216 net register tons (NRT). She had a vertical triple-expansion steam engine driving a single screw propeller. The engine was rated at a total of 158 nominal horsepower and produced 1,250 indicated horsepower (930 kW). This gave her a maximum speed of 10 knots (19 km/h; 12 mph).

== Construction and career ==
Eskmere was laid down as yard number 66 by North of Ireland Shipbuilding Co. at its shipyard in Derry, Ireland, for the Watson Steamship Co. The ship was Launched on 10 April 1916 as Thirlmere and completed on 11 July. Whilst fitting out, she was sold to the Lever Brothers' newly formed Bromport Steamship Co. on 11 May and renamed Eskmere. The ship was bound for Barry, Wales, in ballast when she was torpedoed by UC-75 on 13 October 1917, 15 miles (24 km) off South Stack Lighthouse with the loss of 20 crewmen.

== Bibliography ==
- Admiralty (1988) [1919]. "Merchant Shipping (Losses): British Merchant Vessels Captured or Destroyed by the Enemy". British Vessels Lost at Sea, 1914-18 and 1939-45 (3rd ed.). Wellingborough, UK: Patrick Stephens. pp. 1–99. ISBN 1-85260-134-5.
- Fenton, Roy (December 2022). "Levers' Early Shipping Ventures: Bromport Steamship Co., Ltd. and its Predecessors". Marine News Supplement. 76 (12): S340–S352. ISSN 0966-6958.
