= SM UB-41 =

Coordinates: 54°18′N 0°21′W

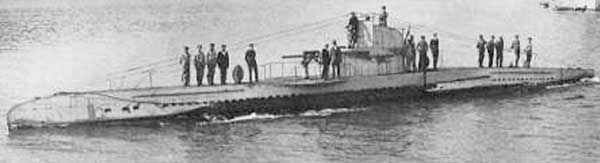
- SM UB-45 a U-boat similar to UB-41

History

German Empire
- Name: UB-41
- Ordered: 22 July 1915
- Builder: Blohm & Voss, Hamburg
- Cost: 1,152,000 German Papiermark
- Yard number: 265
- Launched: 6 May 1916
- Completed: 25 August 1916
- Commissioned: 25 August 1916
- Fate: Sunk by mine 5 October 1917

General characteristics
- Class & type: Type UB II submarine
- Displacement: 274 t (270 long tons) surfaced; 303 t (298 long tons) submerged
- Length: 36.90 m (121 ft 1 in) o/a; 27.90 m (91 ft 6 in) pressure hull
- Beam: 4.37 m (14 ft 4 in) o/a; 3.85 m (12 ft 8 in) pressure hull
- Draught: 3.69 m (12 ft 1 in)
- Propulsion: 1 × propeller shaft; 2 × 6-cylinder diesel engine, 284 PS (209 kW; 280 bhp); 2 × electric motor, 280 PS (210 kW; 280 shp)
- Speed: 9.15 knots (16.95 km/h; 10.53 mph) surfaced; 5.81 knots (10.76 km/h; 6.69 mph) submerged
- Range: 6,450 nmi (11,950 km; 7,420 mi) at 5 knots (9.3 km/h; 5.8 mph) surfaced; 45 nmi (83 km; 52 mi) at 4 knots (7.4 km/h; 4.6 mph) submerged
- Test depth: 50 m (160 ft)
- Complement: 2 officers, 21 men
- Armament: 2 × 50 cm (19.7 in) torpedo tubes; 4 × torpedoes (later 6); 1 × 8.8 cm (3.5 in) Uk L/30 deck gun
- Notes: 42-second diving time

Service record
- Part of: II Flotilla; 2 November 1916 – 13 September 1917; V Flotilla; 13 September – 5 October 1917
- Commanders: Oblt.z.S. Friedrich Karl Sichart von Sichartshofen; 25 August 1916 – 20 March 1917; Oblt.z.S. Günther Krause; 21 March – 13 September 1917; Oblt.z.S. Max Ploen; 14 September – 5 October 1917
- Operations: 13 patrols
- Victories: 8 merchant ships sunk (8,387 GRT); 2 merchant ships damaged (641 GRT); 1 merchant ship taken as prize (259 GRT)

SM UB-41 (Note: "SM" stands for "Seiner Majestät" (English: His Majesty's) and combined with the U for Unterseeboot would be translated as His Majesty's Submarine.) was a German Type UB II submarine or U-boat in the German Imperial Navy (German: Kaiserliche Marine) during World War I.

== Design ==
A Type UB II submarine, UB-41 had a displacement of 274 tonnes (270 long tons) when at the surface and 303 tonnes (298 long tons) while submerged. She had a total length of 36.90 m (121 ft 1 in), a beam of 4.37 m (14 ft 4 in), and a draught of 3.69 m (12 ft 1 in). The submarine was powered by two Körting six-cylinder diesel engines producing a total 284 metric horsepower (280 shp; 209 kW), two Siemens-Schuckert electric motors producing 280 metric horsepower (210 kW; 280 shp), and one propeller shaft. She was capable of operating at depths of up to 50 metres (160 ft).

The submarine had a maximum surface speed of 9.15 knots (16.95 km/h; 10.53 mph) and a maximum submerged speed of 5.81 knots (10.76 km/h; 6.69 mph). When submerged, she could operate for 45 nautical miles (83 km; 52 mi) at 4 knots (7.4 km/h; 4.6 mph); when surfaced, she could travel 6,450 nautical miles (11,950 km; 7,420 mi) at 5 knots (9.3 km/h; 5.8 mph). UB-41 was fitted with two 50 centimetres (20 in) torpedo tubes, four torpedoes, and one 8.8 cm (3.5 in) Uk L/30 deck gun. She had a complement of twenty-one crew members and two officers and a 42-second dive time.

== Construction and career ==
The U-boat was ordered on 22 July 1915 and launched on 6 May 1916. She was commissioned into the German Imperial Navy on 25 August 1916 as SM UB-41.

The submarine sank eight ships in thirteen patrols. They included the William Cory and Son collier SS Harrow, which UB-41 torpedoed in the North Sea off Robin Hood's Bay on 8 September 1917. UB-41 was reported missing on 5 October 1917. The same day, a large explosion was observed from the coast at Scarborough, England. The case of her loss was either an internal explosion, or she struck a mine, possibly a German one, and sank in the North Sea on 5 October 1917.

Her wrecksite was discovered in 1989 and surveyed in 1997 and 2003. The vessel is broken into two sections, at degree angles laying on the starboard side, and showing signs of impact damage.

== Summary of raiding history ==
Date	Name	Nationality	Tonnage (Note: Tonnages are in gross register tons)	Fate
21 November 1916	Thyholmen	Norway	259	Captured as prize
18 January 1917	Cetus	United Kingdom	139	Damaged
19 April 1917	Ellida	Norway	1,124	Sunk
22 May 1917	Lanthorn	United Kingdom	2,299	Sunk
23 May 1917	Monarch	Norway	1,318	Sunk
12 June 1917	Alwyn	United Kingdom	73	Sunk
13 June 1917	Silverburn	United Kingdom	284	Sunk
14 June 1917	Angantyr	Denmark	1,359	Sunk
6 August 1917	Talisman	United Kingdom	153	Sunk
8 September 1917	Harrow	United Kingdom	1,777	Sunk
3 October 1917	Clydebrae	United Kingdom	502	Damaged

== Bibliography ==
- Bendert, Harald (2000). Die UB-Boote der Kaiserlichen Marine, 1914-1918. Einsätze, Erfolge, Schicksal (in German). Hamburg: Verlag E.S. Mittler & Sohn GmbH. ISBN 3-8132-0713-7.
- Gröner, Erich; Jung, Dieter; Maass, Martin (1991). U-boats and Mine Warfare Vessels. German Warships 1815–1945. Vol. 2. Translated by Thomas, Keith; Magowan, Rachel. London: Conway Maritime Press. ISBN 0-85177-593-4.
- Howell, D; Croce, Paulo (November 2013). Archaeological Services in Relation to Marine DesignationUB-41 and UB-75, off Robin Hood's Bay. research.historicengland.org.uk (Report). Salisbury: Wessex Archaeology (for English Heritage).
- Rössler, Eberhard (1979). Die deutschen U-Boote und ihre Werften: eine Bilddokumentation über den deutschen U-Bootbau; in zwei Bänden (in German). Vol. I. Munich: Bernard & Graefe. ISBN 3-7637-5213-7.
