= SM UB-34 =

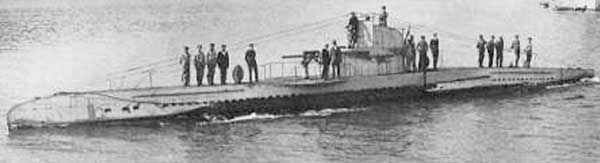
- SM UB-45, a U-boat similar to UB-34

History

German Empire
- Name: UB-34
- Ordered: 22 July 1915
- Builder: Blohm & Voss, Hamburg
- Cost: 1,152,000 German Papiermark
- Yard number: 258
- Launched: 28 December 1915
- Completed: 17 May 1916
- Commissioned: 10 June 1916
- Fate: Surrendered 26 November 1918

General characteristics
- Class & type: Type UB II submarine
- Displacement: 274 t (270 long tons) surfaced; 303 t (298 long tons) submerged
- Length: 36.90 m (121 ft 1 in) o/a; 27.90 m (91 ft 6 in) pressure hull
- Beam: 4.37 m (14 ft 4 in) o/a; 3.85 m (12 ft 8 in) pressure hull
- Draught: 3.69 m (12 ft 1 in)
- Propulsion: 1 × propeller shaft; 2 × 6-cylinder diesel engine, 270 PS (200 kW; 270 bhp); 2 × electric motor, 280 PS (210 kW; 280 shp)
- Speed: 9.06 knots (16.78 km/h; 10.43 mph) surfaced; 5.71 knots (10.57 km/h; 6.57 mph) submerged
- Range: 7,030 nmi (13,020 km; 8,090 mi) at 5 knots (9.3 km/h; 5.8 mph) surfaced; 45 nmi (83 km; 52 mi) at 4 knots (7.4 km/h; 4.6 mph) submerged
- Test depth: 50 m (160 ft)
- Complement: 2 officers, 21 men
- Armament: 2 × 50 cm (19.7 in) torpedo tubes; 4 × torpedoes (later 6); 1 × 8.8 cm (3.5 in) Uk L/30 deck gun
- Notes: 42-second diving time

Service record
- Part of: I Flotilla; 27 July 1916 – 1 February 1917; II Flotilla; 1 February – 10 September 1917; V Flotilla; 10 September 1917 – 3 May 1918; I Flotilla; 3 May – 9 September 1918; Flandern Flotilla; 9 September – 6 October 1918; Training Flotilla; 6 October – 11 November 1918
- Commanders: Oblt.z.S. Theodor Schultz; 10 June 1916 – 16 March 1917; Oblt.z.S. Ludwig Schaafhausen; 17 March – 31 August 1917; Oblt.z.S. Helmuth von Ruckteschell; 1 September 1917 – 30 March 1918; Oblt.z.S. Erich Förste; 31 March – 8 September 1918; Lt.z.S. Hans Illing; 9 September - 6 October 1918
- Operations: 21 patrol
- Victories: 29 merchant ships sunk (39,122 GRT); 2 auxiliary warships sunk (374 GRT); 2 merchant ships damaged (12,406 GRT); 2 merchant ships taken as prize (2,210 GRT)

SM UB-34 (Note: "SM" stands for "Seiner Majestät" (English: His Majesty's) and combined with the U for Unterseeboot would be translated as His Majesty's Submarine.) was a German Type UB II submarine or U-boat in the German Imperial Navy (German: Kaiserliche Marine) during World War I. The U-boat was ordered on 22 July 1915 and launched on 5 December 1915. She was commissioned into the German Imperial Navy on 10 June 1916 as SM UB-34.

UB-34 sank 31 ships in 21 patrols. They included the William Cory and Son collier SS Hurstwood, which UB-34 torpedoed and sank in the North Sea off Whitby on 5 February 1917.

The submarine served in the Training Flotilla at the end of the war and was surrendered on 26 November 1918 in accordance with the requirements of the Armistice with Germany. UB-34 was broken up in Canning Town in 1922.

== Design ==
A Type UB II submarine, UB-34 had a displacement of 274 tonnes (270 long tons) when at the surface and 303 tonnes (298 long tons) while submerged. She had a total length of 36.90 m (121 ft 1 in), a beam of 4.37 m (14 ft 4 in), and a draught of 3.69 m (12 ft 1 in). The submarine was powered by two Benz six-cylinder diesel engines producing a total 270 metric horsepower (270 shp; 200 kW), two Siemens-Schuckert electric motors producing 280 metric horsepower (210 kW; 280 shp), and one propeller shaft. She was capable of operating at depths of up to 50 metres (160 ft).

The submarine had a maximum surface speed of 9.06 knots (16.78 km/h; 10.43 mph) and a maximum submerged speed of 5.71 knots (10.57 km/h; 6.57 mph). When submerged, she could operate for 45 nautical miles (83 km; 52 mi) at 4 knots (7.4 km/h; 4.6 mph); when surfaced, she could travel 7,030 nautical miles (13,020 km; 8,090 mi) at 5 knots (9.3 km/h; 5.8 mph). UB-34 was fitted with two 50 centimetres (20 in) torpedo tubes, four torpedoes, and one 8.8 cm (3.5 in) Uk L/30 deck gun. She had a complement of twenty-one crew members and two officers and a 42-second dive time.

== Summary of raiding history ==
Date	Name	Nationality	Tonnage (Note: Tonnages are in gross register tons)	Fate
21 October 1916	Ull	Norway	1,139	Sunk
22 October 1916	Effort	United Kingdom	159	Sunk
23 October 1916	Regina	Norway	823	Sunk
26 October 1916	Titan	United Kingdom	171	Sunk
18 December 1916	Arran	United Kingdom	176	Sunk
19 December 1916	Ansgar	Norway	926	Sunk
19 December 1916	Kornmo	Norway	591	Sunk
19 December 1916	Bretland	Denmark	2,025	Captured as prize
20 December 1916	Eva	Denmark	109	Sunk
20 December 1916	Mereddio	Sweden	1,372	Sunk
5 February 1917	Hurstwood	United Kingdom	1,229	Sunk
6 February 1917	Ferruccio	Kingdom of Italy	2,192	Sunk
7 February 1917	Corsican Prince	United Kingdom	2,776	Sunk
7 February 1917	Saint Ninian	United Kingdom	3,026	Sunk
25 April 1917	Este	Denmark	1,420	Sunk
7 September 1917	Grelfryda	United Kingdom	5,136	Damaged
8 September 1917	Aladdin	Norway	753	Sunk
27 September 1917	Greltoria	United Kingdom	5,143	Sunk
29 September 1917	Bertha	Netherlands	185	Captured as prize
27 October 1917	Lady Helen	United Kingdom	811	Sunk
13 December 1917	Bangarth	United Kingdom	1,872	Sunk
15 December 1917	Dafni	Greece	1,190	Sunk
24 January 1918	HMT Desire	Royal Navy	135	Sunk
24 January 1918	X6	United Kingdom	160	Sunk
24 January 1918	X110	United Kingdom	160	Sunk
25 January 1918	Folmina	Netherlands	1,158	Sunk
25 January 1918	Humber	United Kingdom	280	Sunk
26 January 1918	Hartley	United Kingdom	1,150	Sunk
26 January 1918	Athos	Norway	1,708	Sunk
9 March 1918	Randelsborg	Denmark	1,551	Sunk
13 March 1918	Adine	Norway	2,235	Sunk
16 March 1918	Quintero	Denmark	1,611	Sunk
21 April 1918	Lompoc	United Kingdom	7,270	Damaged
10 June 1918	Lowtyne	United Kingdom	3,231	Sunk
22 September 1918	HMT Elise	Royal Navy	239	Sunk

== Bibliography ==
- Bendert, Harald (2000). Die UB-Boote der Kaiserlichen Marine, 1914-1918. Einsätze, Erfolge, Schicksal (in German). Hamburg: Verlag E.S. Mittler & Sohn GmbH. ISBN 3-8132-0713-7.
- Gröner, Erich; Jung, Dieter; Maass, Martin (1991). U-boats and Mine Warfare Vessels. German Warships 1815–1945. Vol. 2. Translated by Thomas, Keith; Magowan, Rachel. London: Conway Maritime Press. ISBN 0-85177-593-4.
- Rössler, Eberhard (1979). Die deutschen U-Boote und ihre Werften: eine Bilddokumentation über den deutschen U-Bootbau; in zwei Bänden (in German). Vol. I. Munich: Bernard & Graefe. ISBN 3-7637-5213-7.
