= Small nucleolar RNA SNORD28 =

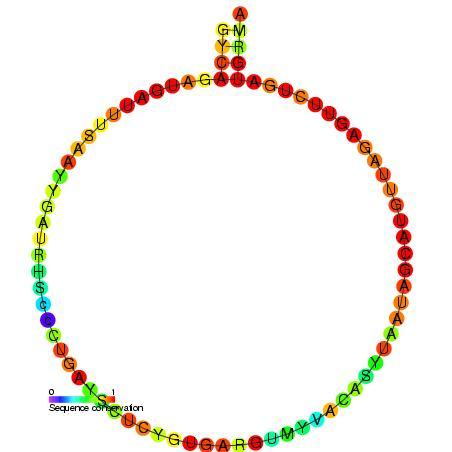
- Predicted secondary structure and sequence conservation of SNORD28

Identifiers
- Symbol: SNORD28
- Alt. Symbols: U28
- Rfam: RF00085

Other data
- RNA type: Gene; snRNA; snoRNA; CD-box
- Domain: Eukaryota
- GO: GO:0006396 GO:0005730
- SO: SO:0000593
- PDB structures: PDBe

In molecular biology, Small nucleolar RNA SNORD28 (U28) is a member of the C/D class of snoRNA which contain the C (UGAUGA) and D (CUGA) box motifs. U28 is encoded within the U22 snoRNA host gene (UHG) in mammals and is thought to act as a 2'-O-ribose methylation guide for ribosomal RNA.
