= SM UB-25 =

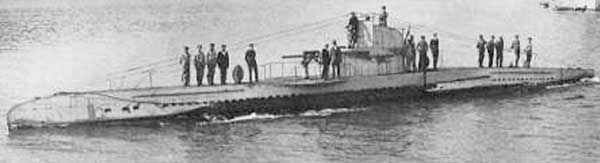
- SM UB-45, a U-boat similar to UB-25

History

German Empire
- Name: UB-25
- Ordered: 30 April 1915
- Builder: AG Weser, Bremen
- Cost: 1,291,000 German Papiermark
- Yard number: 239
- Laid down: 30 June 1915
- Launched: 22 November 1915
- Commissioned: 11 December 1915
- Fate: Sunk in accident 19 March 1917; salvaged; surrendered 26 November 1918; scrapped 1919.

General characteristics
- Class & type: Type UB II submarine
- Displacement: 265 t (261 long tons) surfaced; 291 t (286 long tons) submerged
- Length: 36.13 m (118 ft 6 in) o/a; 27.13 m (89 ft) pressure hull
- Beam: 4.36 m (14 ft 4 in) o/a; 3.85 m (13 ft) pressure hull
- Draught: 3.66 m (12 ft)
- Propulsion: 1 × propeller shaft; 2 × 6-cylinder diesel engine, 270 PS (200 kW; 270 bhp); 2 × electric motor, 280 PS (210 kW; 280 shp)
- Speed: 8.9 knots (16.5 km/h; 10.2 mph) surfaced; 5.72 knots (10.59 km/h; 6.58 mph) submerged
- Range: 7,200 nmi (13,300 km; 8,300 mi) at 5 knots (9.3 km/h; 5.8 mph) surfaced; 45 nmi (83 km; 52 mi) at 4 knots (7.4 km/h; 4.6 mph) submerged
- Test depth: 50 m (160 ft)
- Complement: 2 officers, 21 men
- Armament: 2 × 50 cm (19.7 in) torpedo tubes; 4 × torpedoes (later 6); 1 × 5 cm SK L/40 gun
- Notes: 30-second diving time

Service record
- Commanders: Oblt.z.S. Hans Nieland; 11 – 24 December 1915
- Operations: No patrols
- Victories: None

SM UB-25 was a German Type UB II submarine or U-boat in the German Imperial Navy (German: Kaiserliche Marine) during World War I. The U-boat was ordered on 30 April 1915 and launched on 9 October 1915. She was commissioned into the German Imperial Navy on 11 December 1915 as SM UB-25. (Note: "SM" stands for "Seiner Majestät" (English: His Majesty's) and combined with the U for Unterseeboot would be translated as His Majesty's Submarine.) The submarine was lost in a collision with SMS V26 in Kiel harbour on 17 March 1917. She was raised on 22 March 1917 by the salvage ship SMS Vulcan and served on as a training boat until surrendered to the Allies at Harwich on 26 November 1918 in accordance with the requirements of the Armistice with Germany. She was sold by the British Admiralty to George Cohen on 3 March 1919 for £750 (excluding her engines), and was broken up at Canning Town.

== Design ==
A Type UB II submarine, UB-25 had a displacement of 265 tonnes (261 long tons) when at the surface and 291 tonnes (286 long tons) while submerged. She had a total length of 36.13 m (118 ft 6 in), a beam of 4.36 m (14 ft 4 in), and a draught of 3.66 m (12 ft 0 in). The submarine was powered by two Benz six-cylinder diesel engines each producing a total 267 metric horsepower (263 shp; 196 kW), a Siemens-Schuckert electric motor producing 210 kilowatts (280 shp; 290 PS), and one propeller shaft. She was capable of operating at depths of up to 50 metres (160 ft).

The submarine had a maximum surface speed of 8.90 knots (16.48 km/h; 10.24 mph) and a maximum submerged speed of 5.72 knots (10.59 km/h; 6.58 mph). When submerged, she could operate for 45 nautical miles (83 km; 52 mi) at 4 knots (7.4 km/h; 4.6 mph); when surfaced, she could travel 7,200 nautical miles (13,300 km; 8,300 mi) at 5 knots (9.3 km/h; 5.8 mph). UB-25 was fitted with two 50 centimetres (20 in) torpedo tubes, four torpedoes, and one 5 cm (2.0 in) SK L/40 deck gun. She had a complement of twenty-one crew members and two officers and a thirty-second dive time.

== Bibliography ==
- Bendert, Harald (2000). Die UB-Boote der Kaiserlichen Marine, 1914-1918. Einsätze, Erfolge, Schicksal (in German). Hamburg: Verlag E.S. Mittler & Sohn GmbH. ISBN 3-8132-0713-7.
- Gröner, Erich; Jung, Dieter; Maass, Martin (1991). U-boats and Mine Warfare Vessels. German Warships 1815–1945. Vol. 2. Translated by Thomas, Keith; Magowan, Rachel. London: Conway Maritime Press. ISBN 0-85177-593-4.
- Rössler, Eberhard (1979). Die deutschen U-Boote und ihre Werften: eine Bilddokumentation über den deutschen U-Bootbau; in zwei Bänden (in German). Vol. I. Munich: Bernard & Graefe. ISBN 3-7637-5213-7.
