= German submarine U-26 =

U-26 may refer to one of the following German submarines:

- SM U-26, was a Type U 23 submarine launched in 1913 and that served in the First World War; torpedoed Russian armored cruiser Pallada in October 1914; sunk in August/September 1915
  - During the First World War, Germany also had these submarines with similar names:
    - SM UB-26, a Type UB II submarine launched in 1915 and scuttled on 5 April 1916; later raised by French and commissioned as Roland Morillot
    - SM UC-26, a Type UC II submarine launched in 1916 and scuttled on 8 May 1917
- German submarine U-26 (1936), a Type IA submarine that served in the Second World War until scuttled on 1 July 1940
- German submarine U-26 (S175), a Type 206 submarine of the Bundesmarine that was launched in 1974 and removed from service in 2005
