= German submarine U-28 =

U-28 may refer to one of the following German submarines:

- SM U-28 (Germany), a Type U 27 submarine launched in 1913 and that served in the First World War until sunk on 2 September 1917
  - During the First World War, Germany also had these submarines with similar names:
    - SM UB-28, a Type UB II submarine launched in 1916 and surrendered on 24 November 1918
    - SM UC-28, a Type UC II submarine launched in 1916 and surrendered on 12 February 1919
- German submarine U-28 (1936), a Type VIIA submarine that served in the Second World War until sunk at pier on 17 March 1944; later raised, but stricken 4 August 1944
- German submarine U-28 (S177), a Type 206 submarine of the Federal Navy that was launched in 1974 and scrapped in 1996

== See also ==
- SM U-28 (Austria-Hungary), a U-27-class submarine of the Austro-Hungarian Navy
