= SM UB-66 =

German submarine

- UB-148 at sea, a U-boat similar to UB-66.

History

German Empire
- Name: UB-66
- Ordered: 20 May 1916
- Builder: Friedrich Krupp Germaniawerft, Kiel
- Cost: 3,276,000 German Papiermark
- Yard number: 284
- Launched: 31 May 1917
- Commissioned: 1 August 1917
- Fate: Missing in the eastern Mediterranean after 17 January 1918

General characteristics
- Class & type: Type UB III submarine
- Displacement: 513 t (505 long tons) surfaced; 647 t (637 long tons) submerged
- Length: 55.83 m (183 ft 2 in) (o/a)
- Beam: 5.80 m (19 ft)
- Draught: 3.67 m (12 ft)
- Propulsion: 2 × propeller shaft; 2 × MAN four-stroke 6-cylinder diesel engines, 1,085 bhp (809 kW); 2 × Siemens-Schuckert electric motors, 780 shp (580 kW)
- Speed: 13.2 knots (24.4 km/h; 15.2 mph) surfaced; 7.6 knots (14.1 km/h; 8.7 mph) submerged
- Range: 9,090 nmi (16,830 km; 10,460 mi) at 6 knots (11 km/h; 6.9 mph) surfaced; 55 nmi (102 km; 63 mi) at 4 knots (7.4 km/h; 4.6 mph) submerged
- Test depth: 50 m (160 ft)
- Complement: 3 officers, 31 men
- Armament: 5 × 50 cm (19.7 in) torpedo tubes (4 bow, 1 stern); 10 torpedoes; 1 × 8.8 cm (3.46 in) deck gun

Service record
- Part of: Constantinople Flotilla; 28 October 1917 – 18 January 1918
- Commanders: Kptlt. Fritz Wernicke; 1 August 1917 – 18 January 1918
- Operations: 2 patrols
- Victories: 2 merchant ships sunk (4,105 GRT)

SM UB-66 was a German Type UB III submarine or U-boat in the German Imperial Navy (German: Kaiserliche Marine) during World War I. She was commissioned into the German Imperial Navy on 1 August 1917 as SM UB-66. (Note: "SM" stands for "Seiner Majestät" (English: His Majesty's) and combined with the U for Unterseeboot would be translated as His Majesty's Submarine.)

UB-66 went missing in the Eastern Mediterranean after 17 January 1918.

== Construction ==
She was built by Friedrich Krupp Germaniawerft of Kiel and following just under a year of construction, launched at Kiel on 31 May 1917. UB-66 was commissioned later that same year under the command of Kptlt. Fritz Wernicke. Like all Type UB III submarines, UB-66 carried 10 torpedoes and was armed with a 8.8 cm (3.46 in) deck gun. UB-66 would carry a crew of up to 3 officer and 31 men and had a cruising range of 9,090 nautical miles (16,830 km; 10,460 mi). UB-66 had a displacement of 513 t (505 long tons) while surfaced and 647 t (637 long tons) when submerged. Her engines enabled her to travel at 13.2 knots (24.4 km/h; 15.2 mph) when surfaced and 7.6 knots (14.1 km/h; 8.7 mph) when submerged.

== Previously recorded fate ==
UB-66 was previously thought to have been depth-charged by HMS Campanula off Cap Bon, Italy on 18 January 1918. However, UB-66 was ordered to patrol in the eastern Mediterranean before sailing to Constantinople. She refueled in Beirut on 10 January, and was sighted off Famagusta on the 12th. UB-66 received credit for sinking Windsor Hall on 17 January, therefore, UB-66 could not have been off Cap Bon the following day.

== Summary of raiding history ==
Date	Name	Nationality	Tonnage (Note: Tonnages are in gross register tons)	Fate
19 October 1917	Martha	Denmark	412	Sunk
17 January 1918	Windsor Hall	United Kingdom	3,693	Sunk

== Bibliography ==
- Bendert, Harald (2000). Die UB-Boote der Kaiserlichen Marine, 1914-1918. Einsätze, Erfolge, Schicksal (in German). Hamburg: Verlag E.S. Mittler & Sohn GmbH. ISBN 3-8132-0713-7.
- Gröner, Erich; Jung, Dieter; Maass, Martin (1991). U-boats and Mine Warfare Vessels. German Warships 1815–1945. Vol. 2. Translated by Thomas, Keith; Magowan, Rachel. London: Conway Maritime Press. ISBN 0-85177-593-4.
- Rössler, Eberhard (1979). Die deutschen U-Boote und ihre Werften: eine Bilddokumentation über den deutschen U-Bootbau; in zwei Bänden (in German). Vol. I. Munich: Bernard & Graefe. ISBN 3-7637-5213-7.
