= SM U-90 =

Coordinates: 50°30′56″N 01°09′51″W

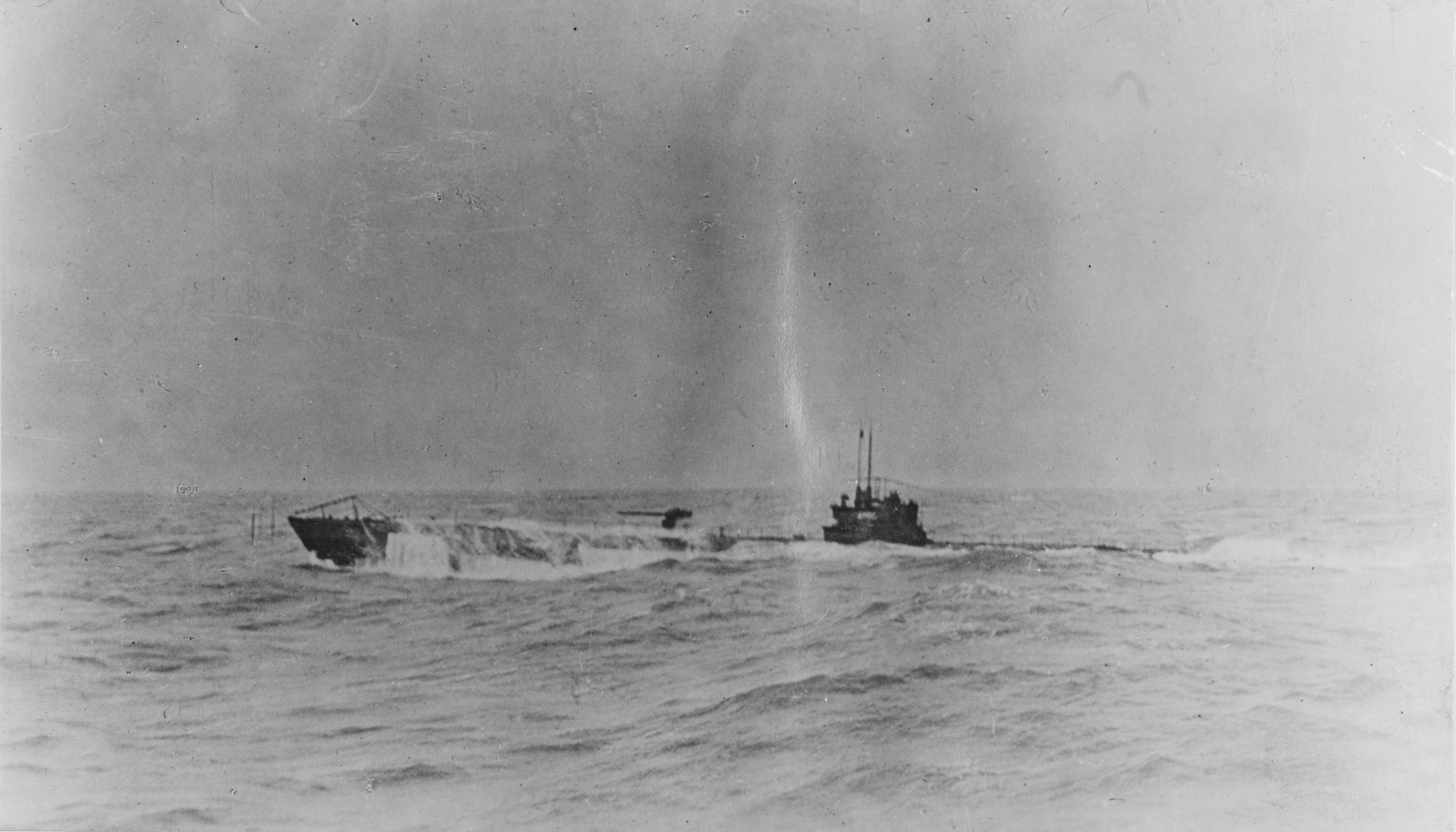

History

German Empire
- Name: U-90
- Ordered: 23 June 1915
- Builder: Kaiserliche Werft Danzig
- Yard number: 34
- Laid down: 29 December 1915
- Launched: 12 January 1917
- Commissioned: 2 August 1917
- Fate: Surrendered 20 November 1918; foundered in tow 1919

General characteristics
- Class & type: Type U 87 submarine
- Displacement: 757 t (745 long tons) surfaced; 998 t (982 long tons) submerged
- Length: 65.80 m (215 ft 11 in) (o/a); 50.07 m (164 ft 3 in) (pressure hull)
- Beam: 6.20 m (20 ft 4 in) (o/a); 4.18 m (13 ft 9 in) (pressure hull)
- Height: 9.35 m (30 ft 8 in)
- Draught: 3.88 m (12 ft 9 in)
- Installed power: 2 × 2,400 PS (1,765 kW; 2,367 shp) surfaced; 2 × 1,200 PS (883 kW; 1,184 shp) submerged
- Propulsion: 2 shafts, 2 × 1.66 m (5 ft 5 in) propellers
- Speed: 16.8 knots (31.1 km/h; 19.3 mph) surfaced; 9.1 knots (16.9 km/h; 10.5 mph) submerged
- Range: 11,380 nmi (21,080 km; 13,100 mi) at 8 knots (15 km/h; 9.2 mph) surfaced; 56 nmi (104 km; 64 mi) at 5 knots (9.3 km/h; 5.8 mph) submerged
- Test depth: 50 m (160 ft)
- Complement: 4 officers, 32 enlisted
- Armament: 4 × 50 cm (19.7 in) torpedo tubes (two bow, two stern); 10-12 torpedoes; 1 × 10.5 cm (4.1 in) deck gun

Service record
- Part of: III Flotilla; 10 September 1917 – 11 November 1918
- Commanders: Kptlt. Walter Remy; 2 August 1917 – 31 July 1918; Oblt.z.S. Helmut Patzig; 1–31 August 1918; Kptlt. Heinrich Jeß; 1 September – 11 November 1918
- Operations: 7 patrols
- Victories: 28 merchant ships sunk (49,348 GRT); 2 auxiliary warship sunk (24,827 GRT); 1 merchant ships damaged (3,405 GRT); 1 auxiliary warship damaged (5,189 GRT)

SM U-90 was a Type U-87 U-boat of the Imperial German Navy during World War I. Its commander Walter Remy made regular stops at remote island North Rona for provisions such as fresh mutton. On 15 May 1918, U-90 shelled the Hirta wireless station in St Kilda, Scotland. On 31 May 1918, U-90 torpedoed and sank USS President Lincoln, a former Hamburg America Line steamer that had been seized by the United States for troop transportation. From the U.S. Navy crew that abandoned the sinking vessel, U-90 captured Lieutenant Edouard Izac, eventually taking him to Germany. Izac later escaped German captivity and reported to the US Navy about German submarine movements.

U-90 was surrendered to the Allies at Harwich on 20 November 1918 in accordance with the requirements of the Armistice with Germany, and later laid up at Pembroke. She was to be loaned to Belgium, and was en route there in tow from Pembroke when she foundered off the Isle of Wight on 29 November 1919.

== Design ==
Type U 87 submarines were preceded by the shorter Type U 81 submarines. U-90 had a displacement of 757 tonnes (745 long tons) when at the surface and 998 tonnes (982 long tons) while submerged. She had a total length of 65.80 m (215 ft 11 in), a pressure hull length of 50.07 m (164 ft 3 in), a beam of 6.20 m (20 ft 4 in), a height of 9.35 m (30 ft 8 in), and a draught of 3.88 m (12 ft 9 in). The submarine was powered by two 2,400 metric horsepower (1,800 kW; 2,400 shp) engines for use while surfaced, and two 1,200 metric horsepower (880 kW; 1,200 shp) engines for use while submerged. She had two propeller shafts. She was capable of operating at depths of up to 50 metres (160 ft).

The submarine had a maximum surface speed of 15.6 knots (28.9 km/h; 18.0 mph) and a maximum submerged speed of 8.6 knots (15.9 km/h; 9.9 mph). When submerged, she could operate for 56 nautical miles (104 km; 64 mi) at 5 knots (9.3 km/h; 5.8 mph); when surfaced, she could travel 11,380 nautical miles (21,080 km; 13,100 mi) at 8 knots (15 km/h; 9.2 mph). U-90 was fitted with four 50 centimetres (20 in) torpedo tubes (two at the bow and two at the stern), ten to twelve torpedoes, and one 10.5-centimetre (4.1 in) deck gun. She had a complement of thirty-six (thirty-two crew members and four officers).

== Summary of raiding history ==
Date	Name	Nationality	Tonnage (Note: Merchant ship tonnages are in gross register tons. Military vessels are listed by tons displacement.)	Fate
25 September 1917	Union Republicaine	France	44	Sunk
27 September 1917	Deux Jeannes	France	50	Sunk
27 September 1917	Liberte	France	49	Sunk
27 September 1917	Peuples Freres	France	41	Sunk
30 September 1917	Drake	United Kingdom	2,267	Sunk
30 September 1917	Heron	United Kingdom	885	Sunk
1 October 1917	Neuilly	France	2,186	Sunk
3 October 1917	Jeannette	France	226	Sunk
20 November 1917	Robert Morris	United Kingdom	146	Sunk
21 November 1917	Aros Castle	United Kingdom	4,460	Sunk
22 January 1918	Corton	United Kingdom	3,405	Damaged
22 January 1918	Victor De Chavarri	Spain	2,957	Sunk
24 January 1918	Charles	United Kingdom	78	Sunk
25 January 1918	Normandy	United Kingdom	618	Sunk
26 January 1918	Union	France	677	Sunk
30 January 1918	Lindeskov	Denmark	1,254	Sunk
31 January 1918	Martin Gust	Russian Empire	248	Sunk
1 February 1918	Arrino	United Kingdom	4,484	Sunk
16 March 1918	Oilfield	United Kingdom	4,000	Sunk
28 March 1918	City of Winchester	United Kingdom	114	Sunk
8 April 1918	Superb	Norway	489	Sunk
29 May 1918	Begum	United Kingdom	4,646	Sunk
29 May 1918	Carlton	United Kingdom	5,265	Sunk
31 May 1918	USS President Lincoln	United States Navy	18,168	Sunk
15 August 1918	USS Montanan	United States Navy	6,659	Sunk
15 August 1918	J. M. J.	France	54	Sunk
16 August 1918	USS West Bridge	United States Navy	5,189	Damaged
17 August 1918	Escrick	United Kingdom	4,151	Sunk
17 August 1918	Joseph Cudahy	United States	3,302	Sunk
24 August 1918	Graciosa	Portugal	2,276	Sunk
14 October 1918	Dundalk	United Kingdom	794	Sunk
16 October 1918	Pentwyn	United Kingdom	3,587	Sunk

== Bibliography ==
- Dodson, Aidan (2020). "A's & A's: Japan's U-boats". In Jordan, John (ed.). Warship 2020. Oxford, UK: Osprey. p. 198. ISBN 978-1-4728-4071-4.
- Gröner, Erich; Jung, Dieter; Maass, Martin (1991). U-boats and Mine Warfare Vessels. German Warships 1815–1945. Vol. 2. Translated by Thomas, Keith; Magowan, Rachel. London: Conway Maritime Press. ISBN 0-85177-593-4.
