= Small nucleolar RNA SNORD25 =

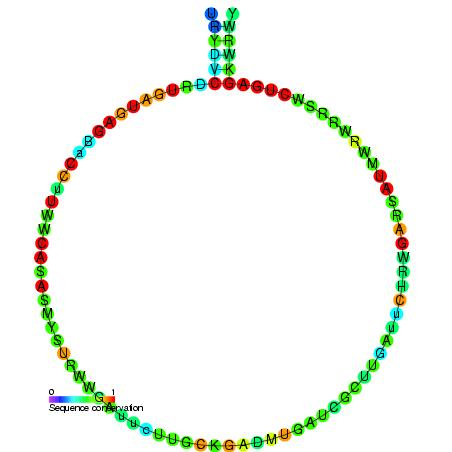
- Predicted secondary structure and sequence conservation of SNORD25

Identifiers
- Symbol: SNORD25
- Alt. Symbols: U25
- Rfam: RF00054

Other data
- RNA type: Gene; snRNA; snoRNA; CD-box
- Domain: Eukaryota
- GO: GO:0006396 GO:0005730
- SO: SO:0000593
- PDB structures: PDBe

In molecular biology, snoRNA U25 (also known as SNORD25) is a non-coding RNA (ncRNA) molecule which functions in the biogenesis (modification) of other small nuclear RNAs (snRNAs). This type of modifying RNA is located in the nucleolus of the eukaryotic cell which is a major site of snRNA biogenesis. It is known as a small nucleolar RNA (snoRNA) and also often referred to as a guide RNA.

U25 is a member of the C/D box class of snoRNAs which contain the conserved sequence motifs known as the C box (UGAUGA) and the D box (CUGA). Most of the members of the box C/D family function in directing site-specific 2'-O-methylation of substrate RNAs.

U25 is found in gene clusters in plants and within the U22 snoRNA host gene (UHG) in mammals. U25 is thought to as a 2'-O-ribose methylation guide for ribosomal RNA. This RNA has also been named snoRNA R73 in some plants.
