= Small nucleolar RNA SNORD22 =

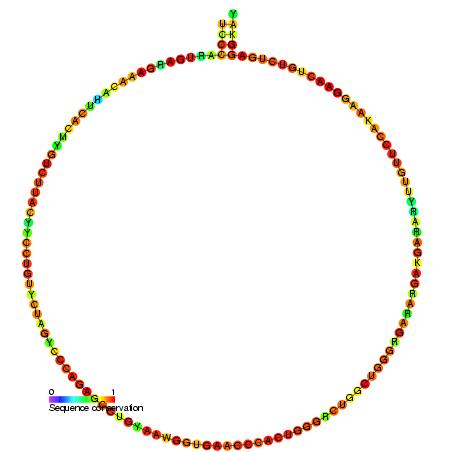
- Predicted secondary structure and sequence conservation of SNORD22

Identifiers
- Symbol: SNORD22
- Alt. Symbols: U22
- Rfam: RF00099

Other data
- RNA type: Gene; snRNA; snoRNA; CD-box
- Domain: Eukaryota
- GO: GO:0006396 GO:0005730
- SO: SO:0000593
- PDB structures: PDBe

In molecular biology, snoRNA U22 (also known as SNORD22) is a non-coding RNA (ncRNA) molecule which functions in the modification of other small nuclear RNAs (snRNAs). This type of modifying RNA is usually located in the nucleolus of the eukaryotic cell which is a major site of snRNA biogenesis. It is known as a small nucleolar RNA (snoRNA) and also often referred to as a guide RNA.

U22 belongs to the C/D box class of snoRNAs which contain the conserved sequence motifs known as the C box (UGAUGA) and the D box (CUGA). Most of the members of the box C/D family function in directing site-specific 2'-O-methylation of substrate RNAs.

In the human genome snoRNA U22 is encoded along with seven other snoRNAs within the introns of the same gene (called UHG for U22 host gene) in mammals. U22 has also been identified in the amphibian Xenopus laevis U22 is predicted to guide the 2'-O-ribose methylation guide for ribosomal RNA.
