= Type UB II submarine =

1915 class of German and Austro-Hungarian submarines

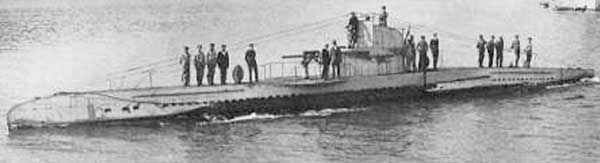
- SM UB-45

Class overview
- Builders: AG Weser, Bremen; Blohm & Voss, Hamburg; Cantiere Navale Triestino, Pola; Ganz Danubius, Fiume
- Operators: Imperial German Navy; Austro-Hungarian Navy; French Navy
- Preceded by: UB I
- Succeeded by: UB III
- Built: 1915–1916
- In commission: 1915–1931
- Completed: 38
- Lost: 21
- Scrapped: 17

General characteristics UB-18 - UB-47
- Displacement: 263–279 t (259–275 long tons) surfaced; 292–305 t (287–300 long tons) submerged
- Length: 36.13–36.90 m (118 ft 6 in – 121 ft 1 in) (o/a)
- Beam: 4.36–4.37 m (14 ft 4 in – 14 ft 4 in)
- Draught: 3.66–3.75 m (12 ft 0 in – 12 ft 4 in)
- Installed power: two Körting, Daimler or Benz diesel engines, 270–284 PS (199–209 kW; 266–280 bhp); two Siemens-Schuckert electric motors, 280 PS (206 kW; 276 shp)
- Speed: 8.82–9.15 knots (16.33–16.95 km/h; 10.15–10.53 mph) surfaced; 5.71–6.22 knots (10.57–11.52 km/h; 6.57–7.16 mph) submerged
- Range: 6,450–7,200 nmi (11,950–13,330 km; 7,420–8,290 mi) at 5 knots (9.3 km/h; 5.8 mph) surfaced; 45 nmi (83 km; 52 mi) at 4 knots (7.4 km/h; 4.6 mph) submerged
- Complement: 2 officers, 21 men
- Armament: 2 × 50 cm (20 in) bow torpedo tubes + 2 external tubes in UB-34, UB-35 and UB-41; 1 × 5 cm (1.97 in) or 8.8 cm (3.46 in) deck gun

The UB II type submarine was a class of coastal U-boats built during World War I by the German Imperial Navy and Austro-Hungarian Navy. The Type UB II class was twice as large as the preceding type UB I in order to incorporate much needed improvements in performance and armament. The class was a single hull design with saddle tanks. The first batch of twelve Type UB II was ordered on 30 May 1915, before the last of the Type UB I was commissioned, and the first Type UB II was commissioned before the end of the year. In 1915 and 1916, a total of thirty were built in Germany and eight more were built in Austria-Hungary where they were classified as the U-27-class. They operated in the English Channel, North Sea, the Mediterranean and Black Sea, but did not have enough range to patrol in the Western Approaches. Twenty German and one Austro-Hungarian Type UB II were lost during the war, the remainder were scrapped after the war, except for one that served in the French Navy and was scrapped in 1931.

== Design ==
The design of Type UB II addressed many of the problems apparent in the preceding Type UB I class. The Type UB I had been too small and underpowered, it was not fast enough to chase fleeing merchants and it had not enough power to master the strong currents in the English Channel. When the single diesel broke down, the U-boat was helpless. The Type UB I did not have a deck gun to stop merchants.

The Type UB II boats featured a two-shaft drive with a much larger battery capacity and larger engines. Storage batteries were placed forward of the central diving tanks to compensate for the much heavier engine installation. Type UB II U-boats retained the two bow torpedo tubes of the Type UB I, but could also store two reloads internally. The torpedo tubes were installed one above the other to allow for a bow design that would create optimal surface efficiency. A deck gun was installed before the conning tower. The weight of the boat was increased to 270 tons of surface displacement to accommodate these improvements. Saddle tanks were fitted to the sides of the pressure hull to allow greater fuel storage area. The resulting larger beam meant that these U-boats were not transportable anymore by rail as the preceding Type UB I, but eventually some Type UB II were transported by rail to the Mediterranean Sea by disassembling them in longitudinal sections fitting the railroad gauge. Other improvements over the preceding Type UB I included forward hydroplanes, a second periscope operated from the central control room and a two masted wireless aerial.

=== Construction ===
On 30 April 1915, six Type UB II ( UB-18 - UB-23 ) were ordered from the Blohm & Voss shipyard in Hamburg and one day later a further six ( UB-24 - UB-29 ) were ordered from AG Weser in Bremen. The main reason for building smaller coastal submarines rather than large fleet submarines, was the building time. A fleet submarine took more than one year to build which implied a risk that they would be completed only after the end of the hostilities, whilst these coastal submarines were expected to be delivered before the end of 1915. But when it became apparent that the war would last well into 1916, eightteen more Type UB II were ordered on 27 July 1915: UB-30 - UB-41 were ordered from Blohm & Voss, but were built by Reiherstieg shipyard as subcontractor from Blohm & Voss, and UB-42 - UB-47 were ordered from AG Weser.

In August 1915 the Austro-Hungarian Navy acquired a licence from AG Weser to build Type UB II U-boats. For political reasons the building programme had to be split between the two components of the Austro-Hungarian empire: U-27 and U-28 were ordered from the Cantiere Navale Triestino in Pola which had an Austrian affiliation, and U-29 - U-32 from the Danubius yard in Trieste. which had a Hungarian affiliation. A further two U-boats were ordered from the Cantiere Navale Triestino in 1916: U-40 was ordered on 16 January and after the loss of U-6, U-41 was ordered as a substitute on 28 August. These U-boats were known as the U-27-class. Because U-41 had the spare Grazer diesel engines of U-6 installed, she was 0.8 m (2.6 ft) longer, displaced 7 t (6.9 long tons) more on the surface, and 14 t (14 long tons) more submerged, than her sister ships.

=== Characteristics ===
The four batches of German-built Type UB II U-boats had small variations in overall length, beam, draft and displacement. For all boats, the pressure hull had a length of 44.5 m (146 ft) and a maximum diameter of 4.70 m (15 ft 5 in). Constructional diving depth (Note: Constructional diving depth had a safety factor of 2.5, which meant that crushing depth was 2.5 times construction diving depth.) was 50 m (164 ft 1 in). They all had a complement of two officers and twenty-one men. For submerged propulsion, all boats had two 100 kW (136 PS; 134 shp) Siemens-Schuckert electric motors, which gave a range of 45 nmi (83 km; 52 mi) at 4 knots (7.4 km/h; 4.6 mph). Diesel engines for surfaced propulsion came from three different producers and the yards had to install what was available. Daimler and Körting produced a six-cylinder, four-stroke RS206 engine providing 142 brake horsepower (106 kW), Benz produced the six-cylinder, four-stroke DS25u which provided 135 bhp (101 kW).

All German-built Type UB IIs had two 50 cm (20 in) bow torpedo tubes with two internal reloads, and UB-34, UB-35 and UB-41 had two extra external above-water torpedo launchers. UB-27, UB-34, UB-35 and UB-41 could also carry fourteen mines. UB-21, UB-22, UB-23 and UB-24 could be armed with mines until 1916-1917, and UB-26 received the capability to carry mines only in 1916-1917. The first Type UB II U-boats had a 5 cm SK L/40 deck gun, but later U-boats had a 8.8 cm SK L/30 installed. Some of the U-boats with a 5 cm gun had it later replaced by a 8.8 cm gun; in 1916 in preparation of a renewed U-boat offensive, all Type UB II U-boats of the Flanders U-boat flotilla had a 8.8 cm gun installed so that they were better equipped to attack shipping according to the Prize rules.

The Austro-Hungarian Type UB II U-boats had a complement of five officers and fourteen men. These U-boats were equipped with two torpedo tubes and two torpedo reloads of the smaller 45 cm (18 in) size. They were also equipped with a 75 mm/26 (3.0 in) deck gun and an 8 mm (0.31 in) machine gun

Differences in dimensions, speed, range and diesel engines
batch	UB-18 - UB-23	UB-24 - UB-29	UB-30 - UB-41	UB-42	UB-43 - UB-47	U-27 - U-31, U-40	U-41
displacement surfaced	263 t (259 long tons)	265 t (261 long tons)	274 t (270 long tons)	279 t (275 long tons)	272 t (268 long tons)	268 t (264 long tons)	275 t (271 long tons)
displacement submerged	292 t (287 long tons)	291 t (286 long tons)	303 t (298 long tons)	303 t (298 long tons)	305 t (300 long tons)	306 t (301 long tons)	320 t (310 long tons)
Length	36.13 m (118.5 ft)		36.90 m (121.1 ft)				37.70 m (123.7 ft)
Beam	4.36 m (14.3 ft)		4.37 m (14.3 ft)				
Draught	3.70 m (12.1 ft)	3.66 m (12.0 ft)	3.69 m (12.1 ft)	3.75 m (12.3 ft)	3.68 m (12.1 ft)	3.70 m (12.1 ft)	3.72 m (12.2 ft)
speed surface	9.15 kn (16.95 km/h; 10.53 mph)	8.90 kn (16.48 km/h; 10.24 mph)	9.06 kn (16.78 km/h; 10.43 mph)	8.82 kn (16.33 km/h; 10.15 mph)		9 kn (17 km/h; 10 mph)	
speed submerged	5.81 kn (10.76 km/h; 6.69 mph)	5.72 kn (10.59 km/h; 6.58 mph)	5.71 kn (10.57 km/h; 6.57 mph)	6.22 kn (11.52 km/h; 7.16 mph)		7.5 kn (13.9 km/h; 8.6 mph)	
range surface at 5 knots	6,450 nmi (11,950 km; 7,420 mi)	7,200 nmi (13,300 km; 8,300 mi)	7,030 nmi (13,020 km; 8,090 mi)	6,940 nmi (12,850 km; 7,990 mi)		6,250 nmi (11,580 km; 7,190 mi)	
diesel engines	Daimler RS206; UB-20, UB-23 : Körting	Benz DS25u; UB-26, UB-29 : Daimler RS206	Benz DS25u; UB-36, UB-28 - UB-41 : Körting	Daimler RS206		Daimler RS206; U-30: Körting	Grazer

== History ==
There were thirty Type UB II submarines commissioned into the German Imperial Navy and eight into the Austro-Hungarian Navy. Two German built boats, the UB-43 and UB-47 were sold to Austria-Hungaria on 30 july 1917, transported by rail to Pola at the Adriatic Sea, and were commissioned in the Austro-Hungarian Navy as U-43 and U-47 respectivily.

List of Type UB II submarines built in Germany
name	launched	commissioned	merchant ships sunk (nbr/GRT)	Fate
UB-18	21 Augustus 1915	11 December 1915	126 / 128.555	Rammed and sunk by trawler Ben Lawer on 9 December 1917 in the English Channel.
UB-19	2 September 1915	17 December 1915	14 / 11.558	Sunk by Q-ship HMS Penshurst on 30 November 1916 in the English Channel.
UB-20	20 September 1915	10 February 1916	13 / 9.914	Struck a mine and sank during diving trial on 28 July 1917 off Flanders.
UB-21	20 September 1915	20 February 1916	32 / 35.188	Surrendered on 24 November 1918. Foundered on way to breakers in 1920.
UB-22	9 October 1915	2 March 1916	27 / 16.646	Struck a mine on 19 January 1918 in the North Sea.
UB-23	9 October 1915	12 March 1916	51 / 34.322	Interned at Corunna, Spain July 1917; broken up in 1921 in Brest.
UB-24	18 October 1915	18 November 1915	none	Surrendered to France November 1918; broken up in 1921 in Brest.
UB-25	22 November 1915	11 December 1915	none	Sunk after collision with SMS V26 on 19 March 1917. Salvaged, surrendered to the Allies November 1918; broken up in 1922 at Canning Town.
UB-26	14 December 1915	7 January 1916	none	Sunk on 5 April 1916 in Le Havre. Raised by French Navy repaired as Roland Morillot. Scrapped in 1931.
UB-27	10 February 1916	23 February 1916	12 / 16.666	Sunk by HMS Halcyon on 29 July 1917 in the North Sea.
UB-28	20 December 1915	27 December 1915	none	Surrendered to Britain on 4 November 1918; broken up in 1919-1920 at Bo'ness.
UB-29	31 December 1915	18 January 1916	32 / 39.378	Previously thought sunk by HMS Landrail, but likely mined December 1916 (wreck discovered and examined in 2017)
UB-30	16 November 1915	18 March 1916	18 / 19.606	Depth charged by five trawlers on 13 August 1918 in the North Sea near Whitby.
UB-31	16 November 1915	25 March 1916	27 / 72.370	Struck a mine on 2 May 1918 in the English Channel.
UB-32	4 December 1915	11 April 1916	22 / 42.889	Possibly sunk by aircraft on 22 September 1917 in the English Channel, but was more likely sunk by a mine
UB-33	4 December 1915	22 April 1916	13 / 5.356	Sunk by mines on 11 April 1918 in the English Channel on the Varne Bank
UB-34	28 December 1915	10 June 1916	31 / 39.219	Surrendered on 26 November 1918; broken up 1922 in Canning Town.
UB-35	28 December 1915	22 June 1916	42 / 47.862	Sunk by British warships including HMS Leven on 26 January 1918 in the English Channel.
UB-36	15 January 1916	22 May 1926	11 / 6.252	Sunk by mines 21 May 1917 in the English Channel.
UB-37	28 December 1915	17 May 1916	30 / 20.500	Sunk by Q-ship Penshurst on 14 January 1917 in the English Channel.
UB-38	1 April 1916	19 July 1916	43 / 45.210	Struck a mine on 8 February 1918 in the English Channel
UB-39	29 December 1915	29 April 1916	93 / 89.810	Mined on 18 May 1918 in the English Channel.
UB-40	25 April 1916	17 August 1916	99 / 131.680	Scuttled on 5 October 1918 off Zeebrugge.
UB-41	6 May 1916	25 August 1916	8 / 8.387	Mined on 15 October 1917 in the North Sea.
UB-42	4 March 1916	23 March 1916	10 / 13.184	Surrendered on 26 November 1918; broken up in 1920 in Malta.
UB-43	8 April 1916	24 April 1916	22 / 99.202	Sold to Austria-Hungary on 30 July 1917; turned over to France as war reparation in 1920 and broken up.
UB-44	20 April 1916	11 May 1916	1 / 3.409	Missing after 8 August 1916 in the Ionian Sea.
UB-45	12 May 1916	26 May 1916	3 / 11.666	Struck a mine on 6 November 1916 in the Black Sea.
UB-46	31 May 1916	12 June 1916	4 / 8.099	Struck a Russian mine on 7 December 1916 in the Black Sea. Wreck raised in 1993 and put on display in Çanakkale Turkey.
UB-47	17 June 1916	4 July 1916	20 / 75.834	Sold to Austria-Hungary 30 July 1917; turned over to France as war reparation in 1920 and broken up.

List of Type UB II submarines built in Austria-Hungary
name	commissioned	fate
U-27	November 1916	Surrendered to Italy, where she was broken up in 1920.
U-28	1916	Surrendered to Italy and scrapped In Venice in 1920.
U-29	November 1916	Surrendered to Italy, where she was broken up in 1920.
U-30	January 1917	Missing after 17 March 1917.
U-31	March 1917	Ceded to France after the war and scrapped in 1920.
U-32	April 1917	Surrendered to Italy and scrapped In Venice in 1920.
U-40	May 1917	Surrendered to Italy and scrapped In Venice in 1920.
U-41	May 1917	Ceded to France after the war and scrapped.

== Bibliography ==
- De Groot, Bas (2017). Het Duitse Marinekorps in Vlaanderen 1914-1918. De land-, zee- en luchtoorlog [The German Naval Corps in Flanders 1914-1918. The war at land, on the sea and in the air.] (in Dutch). Soesterberg: Aspekt. ISBN 9789463380478.
- Gibson, R. H; Prendergast, Maurice (2003) [1931]. The German Submarine War, 1914–1918. Annapolis, Maryland: Naval Institute Press. ISBN 1591143144.
- Gröner, Erich; Jung, Dieter; Maass, Martin (1991). German Warships 1815–1945, U-boats and Mine Warfare Vessels. Vol. 2. Translated by Thomas, Keith; Magowan, Rachel. London: Conway Maritime Press. ISBN 0-85177-593-4.
- Herzog, Bodo (1993). Deutsche U-Boote : 1906 - 1966 [German U-boats : 1906 - 1966] (in German). Erlangen: Müller. ISBN 9783860700365.
- Möller, Eberhard; Brack, Werner (2004). The Encyclopedia of U-Boats. London: Chatham. ISBN 1-85367-623-3.
- Rössler, Eberhard (1981). The U-boat: The evolution and technical history of German submarines. London: Cassell & Co. ISBN 0-304-36120-8.
- Termote, Tomas (2014). Oorlog onder Water, Unterseeboots Flottille Flandern 1915-1918 [War below sea, submarine flottille Flanders 1915-1918] (in Dutch). Leuven: Davidsfonds. ISBN 978-90-5908-526-8.
