= 5 cm SK L/40 gun =

5 cm SK L/40
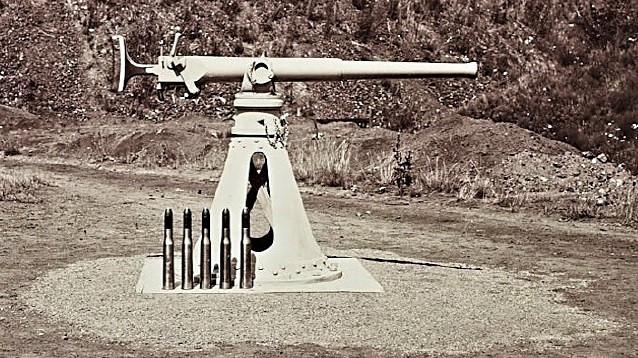
- A 5 cm SK L/40 gun on a center pivot mount.
- Type: Naval gun
- Place of origin: German Empire

Service history
- In service: 1892−1945
- Used by: German Empire; Nazi Germany; Belgium; The Netherlands
- Wars: World War I World War II

Production history
- Designed: 1892
- Produced: 5 cm SK L/40 - 1892; 5 cm Tbts KL/40 - 1913

Specifications
- Mass: 240 kg (530 lb)
- Length: 2 m (6 ft 7 in)
- Barrel length: 1.83 m (6 ft) L/40 caliber
- Shell: Fixed QF 52 x 333R
- Shell weight: 1.75 kg (3.9 lb)
- Caliber: 50 mm (2 in)
- Breech: Horizontal sliding-wedge
- Elevation: -5° to +20°
- Traverse: 360°
- Rate of fire: 10 rpm
- Muzzle velocity: 656 m/s (2,150 ft/s)
- Maximum firing range: 6.2 km (3.9 mi) at +20°

The 5 cm SK L/40 gun (Note: SK - Schnelladekanone (quick loading cannon); L - Länge in Kaliber (length in caliber)) was a German naval gun used in World War I and World War II.

== Service ==
The 5 cm SK L/40 gun was primarily used as an anti-torpedo boat gun aboard avisos, corvettes, gunboats, protected cruisers, submarines, torpedo boats, and unprotected cruisers. It was used by the navies of the German Empire, Nazi Germany, Belgium, and The Netherlands.

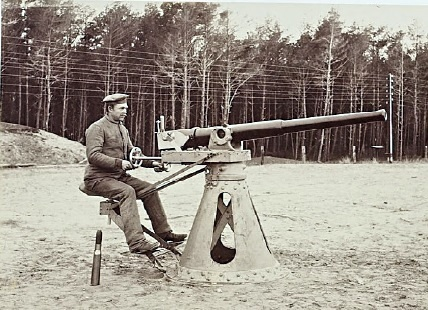

Ship classes that carried the 5 cm SK L/40 include:

- A-class torpedo boats
- Type UB II submarines
- S7-class torpedo boats
- S66-class torpedo boats
- G88-class torpedo boats
- S90-class torpedo boats
- Irene-class cruisers

== See also ==
- List of naval guns
- 5.2 cm SK L/55 naval gun

== Bibliography ==
- Campbell, John (2002). Naval Weapons of World War Two. London: Conway Maritime Press. ISBN 0-87021-459-4.
- Reichs-Marine-Amt, ed. (1898). Die 5 cm Schnelllade-Kanone L/40 in Torpedoboots-Laffete C/92 und ihre Munition, nebst Vorschriften für die Behandlung und Bedienung. E. S. Mittler. OCLC 461072478.
- Friedman, Norman (2011). Naval Weapons of World War One: Guns, Torpedoes, Mines, and ASW Weapons of All Nations: An Illustrated Directory. Annapolis, MD: Naval Institute Press. ISBN 978-1848321007.
