= List of shipwrecks in October 1917 =

The list of shipwrecks in October 1917 includes ships sunk, foundered, grounded, or otherwise lost during October 1917.

== 1 October ==
List of shipwrecks: 1 October 1917
Ship	State	Description
Carrabin	United Kingdom	World War I: The barque was torpedoed and sunk in the Atlantic Ocean south of Daunt Rock by SM U-96 (Imperial German Navy). Her crew survived.
Etna	Italy	World War I: The cargo ship was sunk in the Atlantic Ocean 110 nautical miles (200 km) north east of Madeira, Portugal (33°41′N 15°25′W) by SM U-151 (Imperial German Navy).
Ludovicos	United Kingdom	World War I: The sailing vessel was scuttled in the Mediterranean Sea 7 nautical miles (13 km) south of Pissouri, Cyprus by SM U-73 (Imperial German Navy).
Mersario	United Kingdom	World War I: The cargo ship was torpedoed and sunk in the Atlantic Ocean (86 nautical miles (159 km) west by north of Cape Spartel, Morocco by SM U-39 (Imperial German Navy) with the loss of three crew.
USS Mohawk	United States Navy	The cutter collided with the tanker Vennacher (United Kingdom) in the Atlantic Ocean off Sandy Hook, New Jersey. The patrol boats USS Mohican and USS Sabalo (both United States Navy) took off her entire crew of 77 and the stores ship USS Bridge (United States Navy) attempted to take her under tow, but she sank within an hour of the collision in 100 feet (30 m) of water.
Neuilly	France	World War I: The barque was scuttled in the Atlantic Ocean 450 nautical miles (830 km) south west of Penmarc'h, Finistère (46°14′N 13°07′W) by SM U-90 (Imperial German Navy). Her crew survived.
Normanton	United Kingdom	World War I: The cargo ship was torpedoed and sunk in the Atlantic Ocean 115 nautical miles (213 km) west of Cape Spartel (35°26′N 8°15′W) by SM U-39 (Imperial German Navy). Her crew survived.
Saint Pierre	France	World War I: The schooner was shelled and sunk in the Atlantic Ocean 60 nautical miles (110 km) north west of Ouessant, Finistère (48°30′N 10°00′W) by SM U-60 (Imperial German Navy).

== 2 October ==
List of shipwrecks: 2 October 1917
Ship	State	Description
Almora	United Kingdom	World War I: The cargo ship was torpedoed and sunk in the Atlantic Ocean 100 nautical miles (190 km) west by north of Cape Spartel, Morocco (35°37′N 7°46′W) by SM U-39 (Imperial German Navy). Her crew survived.
HMS Drake	Royal Navy	World War I: Convoy HH34: The Drake-class cruiser was torpedoed by SM U-79 (Imperial German Navy) off Rathlin Island, County Antrim. She made it into Church Bay, Northern Ireland and anchored, but capsized and sank with the loss of eighteen of her 900 crew. On 18–29 September 1978, her wreck was dispersed with explosives.
Hikosan Maru	Japan	World War I: The cargo ship was sunk in the Atlantic Ocean west of Cape Spartel (35°28′N 8°37′W) by SM U-39 (Imperial German Navy). Her crew survived.
Imera	Italy	World War I: The cargo ship was torpedoed and sunk in the Ionian Sea off Santa Maria di Leuca, Lecce by SM UB-48 (Imperial German Navy).
Lugano	United Kingdom	World War I: The cargo ship struck a mine and sank in the Atlantic Ocean 2 nautical miles (3.7 km) south west of Bull Point, County Antrim. Her crew survived.
Nuceria	United Kingdom	World War I: The collier was torpedoed and sunk in the Atlantic Ocean 120 nautical miles (220 km) west of Cape Spartel (35°27′N 8°25′W) by SM U-39 (Imperial German Navy) with the loss of two crew.
Trafaria	Portugal	World War I: The cargo ship was sunk in the Atlantic Ocean 20 nautical miles (37 km) north north west of Cape Ortegal, Spain (45°35′N 9°53′W) by SM U-89 (Imperial German Navy).
Viajante	Portugal	World War I: The barque was sunk in the Atlantic Ocean 170 nautical miles (310 km) north west of Porto Santo Island, Madeira (35°40′N 15°10′W) by SM U-151 (Imperial German Navy).
Willing Boys	United Kingdom	World War I: The fishing smack struck a mine and sank in the North Sea with the loss of five of her crew.

== 3 October ==
List of shipwrecks: 3 October 1917
Ship	State	Description
Annie F. Conlon	United States	World War I: The schooner was shelled and damaged in the Atlantic Ocean 15 nautical miles (28 km) south east of the Isles of Scilly, United Kingdom by SM UC-47 (Imperial German Navy). She capsized while under tow a couple of days later in Crow Sound near Guther's Island and sank. She was salveged and moved to Lower Town, St. Martins and was beached west of West Broad Ledge, but she was subsequently declared a constructive total loss. Her crew survived.
Baron Blantyre	United Kingdom	World War I: The cargo ship was torpedoed and sunk in the Atlantic Ocean 60 nautical miles (110 km) north west by west of Cape Finisterre, Spain (43°15′N 10°30′W) by SM U-89 (Imperial German Navy) with the loss of a crew member.
Britannia	United Kingdom	The sloop foundered in the North Sea with the loss of a crew member.
Elisa	Italy	World War I: The brigantine was shelled and sunk in the Tyrrhenian Sea off Cape Figari, Sardinia (41°07′N 9°47′E) by SM UC-35 (Imperial German Navy).
Ellerslie	United Kingdom	The collier was lost on this date.
Giuseppe Ferrante	Italy	World War I: The sailing vessel was sunk in the Tyrrhenian Sea off Isola del Giglio by SM UC-35 (Imperial German Navy).
Hurst	United Kingdom	World War I: The cargo ship was torpedoed and sunk in St. George's Channel 2.25 nautical miles (4.17 km) west by north of Skokholm, Pembrokeshire by SM U-96 (Imperial German Navy). Her crew survived.
Jane Knox	United Kingdom	The schooner was wrecked in the Bristol Channel off Porthcawl, Glamorgan with the loss of all hands.
Jeanne	France	World War I: The three-masted schooner was sunk in the Bay of Biscay (46°43′N 13°23′W) by SM U-90 (Imperial German Navy) with the loss of six of her crew.
Memling	United Kingdom	World War I: The 7,307 GRT cargo ship was torpedoed and sunk in the Bay of Biscay off Brest, Finistère, France by an unknown Imperial German Navy submarine.
Saint Antoine	France	World War I: The schooner was sunk in the Bay of Biscay (47°30′N 9°40′W) by SM U-60 (Imperial German Navy).
Stella	France	World War I: The schooner was shelled and sunk in the Bay of Biscay (47°30′N 9°40′W) by SM U-60 (Imperial German Navy) with the loss of ten crew.
Tasmania	Italy	World War I: The cargo ship was sunk in the English Channel 8 nautical miles (15 km) west of Prawle Point, Devon, United Kingdom by SM UC-65 (Imperial German Navy).
SM UC-14	Imperial German Navy	World War I: The Type UC I submarine struck a mine and sank in the North Sea off Zeebrugge, West Flanders, Belgium (51°31′50″N 3°08′45″E) with the loss of all fourteen crew.

== 4 October ==
List of shipwrecks: 4 October 1917
Ship	State	Description
Bamalou	French Navy	The naval trawler was lost on this date.
Bygdønes	Norway	World War I: The cargo ship was captured in the Atlantic Ocean by SM U-151 (Imperial German Navy). She was scuttled the next day 65 nautical miles (120 km) north west of Porto Santo Island, Madeira, Portugal. Her crew survived.
Constantinos Embiricos	Greece	World War I: The cargo ship was sunk in the Gulf of Lyon off the Île du Planier, Bouches-du-Rhône, France (42°47′N 4°10′E) by SM U-32 (Imperial German Navy). Her crew survived.
Itasca	United States	The cargo ship foundered in the Atlantic Ocean.
Nicolaos Roussos	Greece	The cargo ship was torpedoed and sunk in the Gulf of Lyon (42°46′N 4°11′E) by SM U-32 (Imperial German Navy).
Perseverance	United Kingdom	World War I: The fishing smack was shelled and sunk in the Atlantic Ocean 15 nautical miles (28 km) west of the Eddystone Lighthouse by SM UB-35 (Imperial German Navy). Her crew survived.
USS Rehoboth	United States Navy	World War I: The patrol vessel sprang a leak in the English Channel. Her crew were rescued by HMS Castor (Royal Navy), which scuttled the ship.
Rupee	United Kingdom	World War I: The fishing smack was shelled and sunk in the Bristol Channel 10 nautical miles (19 km) north of Lundy Island, Devon by SM U-96 (Imperial German Navy) with the loss of four crew.
Stella	French Navy	World War I: The naval trawler struck a mine and sank in the Mediterranean Sea off Cape Bougaroni, Algeria.
Young Clifford	United Kingdom	World War I: The fishing smack was shelled and sunk in the Bristol Channel 12 nautical miles (22 km) north of Lundy Island by SM U-96 (Imperial German Navy). Her crew survived.

== 5 October ==
List of shipwrecks: 5 October 1917
Ship	State	Description
Apache	France	The auxiliary barque foundered on this date with the loss of fifteen of her nineteen crew.
Bontnewydd	United Kingdom	World War I: The cargo ship was torpedoed and sunk in the Mediterranean Sea 60 nautical miles (110 km) north north east of Marsa Susa, Libya (33°53′N 22°19′E) by SM U-28 (Austro-Hungarian Navy) with the loss of three of her crew.
Forestmoor	United Kingdom	World War I: The cargo ship was torpedoed and sunk in the Atlantic Ocean 54 nautical miles (100 km) west north west of Cape Spartel, Morocco (35°57′N 7°03′W) by SM UB-51 (Imperial German Navy) with the loss of 22 crew.
Galley	United Kingdom	The ketch foundered on this date. Her crew survived.
Tolo	United States	The steamer was sunk in a collision with the tug Magic (United States) in Puget Sound. Four people were killed.
SM UB-41	Imperial German Navy	World War I: The Type UB II submarine struck a mine and sank in the North Sea off Scarborough, Yorkshire, United Kingdom with the loss of all 22 crew.

== 6 October ==
List of shipwrecks: 6 October 1917
Ship	State	Description
Bedale	United Kingdom	World War I: The collier was torpedoed and sunk in the Atlantic Ocean 25 nautical miles (46 km) south east by south of Mine Head, Waterford by SM U-96 (Imperial German Navy) with the loss of three of her crew.
Civilian	United Kingdom	World War I: The cargo ship was torpedoed and sunk in the Mediterranean Sea 15 nautical miles (28 km) north of Alexandria, Egypt by SM UC-74 (Imperial German Navy) with the loss of two of her crew.
Citta di Bari	Italy	World War I: The passenger ship was sunk in the Ionian Sea 37 nautical miles (69 km) off Paxos, Greece by SM UB-48 (Imperial German Navy). 337 passengers and crew were lost.
Fortuna	Imperial German Navy	The captured schooner ran aground at Hanga Roa, Easter Island. Her crew survived.
Lamartine	France	World War I: The barquentine was shelled and sunk in the Atlantic Ocean 60 nautical miles (110 km) south west of The Lizard, Cornwall by SM UC-69 (Imperial German Navy).
SMS T54	Imperial German Navy	World War I: The S7-class torpedo boat struck a mine and sank in the Baltic Sea with the loss of seven of her crew.
Victorine	France	World War I: The barque was shelled and damaged in the Atlantic Ocean 96 nautical miles (178 km) north west of Cape Ortegal, Spain (44°50′N 9°30′W) by SM U-89 (Imperial German Navy). She sank the next day.

== 7 October ==
List of shipwrecks: 7 October 1917
Ship	State	Description
Alcyon	United Kingdom	World War I: The sailing vessel was scuttled in the English Channel 12 nautical miles (22 km) west north west of Boulogne, Pas-de-Calais, France by SM UB-57 (Imperial German Navy). Her crew survived.
Georgios	Greece	World War I: The barque was sunk in the Mediterranean Sea north east of Misrata, Libya by SM UC-73 (Imperial German Navy).
SMS M31	Imperial German Navy	World War I: The Type 1915 minesweeper struck a mine and sank in the Baltic Sea off Latvia.
Reliance	United Kingdom	World War I: The drifter struck a mine and sank in the North Sea with the loss of ten of her crew.
SM U-106	Imperial German Navy	World War I: The Type U 93 submarine struck a mine and sank in the North Sea 40 nautical miles (74 km) north of Terschelling, Friesland, Netherlands with the loss of all 41 crew.

== 8 October ==
List of shipwrecks: 8 October 1917
Ship	State	Description
Aylevarroo	United Kingdom	World War I: The coaster was sunk in the Atlantic Ocean off Ballycottin Island, County Cork (51°45′N 7°51′W) by SM U-57 (Imperial German Navy) with the loss of all twenty crew.
HMT Ben Heilem	Royal Navy	The naval trawler was lost on this date.
Greldon	United Kingdom	World War I: The cargo ship was torpedoed and sunk in St. George's Channel 7 nautical miles (13 km) east north east of the North Arklow Lightship (United Kingdom) by SM U-96 (Imperial German Navy) with the loss of 28 crew.
Memphian	United Kingdom	World War I: The cargo liner was torpedoed and sunk in St. George's Channel 7 nautical miles (13 km) east north east of the North Arklow Lightship (United Kingdom) by SM U-96 (Imperial German Navy) with the loss of 32 crew.
Richard de Larrinaga	United Kingdom	World War I: The cargo ship was torpedoed and sunk in the Atlantic Ocean 15 nautical miles (28 km) south east of Ballycottin Island by SM U-57 (Imperial German Navy) with the loss of 35 crew.

== 9 October ==
List of shipwrecks: 9 October 1917
Ship	State	Description
HMS Champagne	Royal Navy	World War I: The armed merchant cruiser was torpedoed and sunk in the Irish Sea 8 nautical miles (15 km) south west of the Calf of Man, Isle of Man (54°17′N 5°10′W) by SM U-96 (Imperial German Navy) with the loss of 58 of her 305 crew. Survivors were rescued by the Peel and Port St. Mary Lifeboats.
Main	United Kingdom	World War I: The coaster was shelled and sunk in Luce Bay 1.5 nautical miles (2.8 km) east of Drummore, Wigtownshire by SM UC-75 (Imperial German Navy) with the loss of twelve of her crew. She was refloated on 7 August 1920, repaired, and returned to service in August 1922.
Nervier	Belgium	World War I: The cargo ship was torpedoed, shelled and damaged off the Orkney Islands by SM U-101 (Imperial German Navy). She sank on 12 October with loss of all hands.
Niki	Greece	World War I: The coaster was sunk in the Ionian Sea 30 nautical miles (56 km) north of Cape Matapan by SM UB-48 (Imperial German Navy). Her crew survived.
Peshawur	United Kingdom	World War I: The cargo ship was torpedoed and sunk in the Irish Sea 7 nautical miles (13 km) south east of Ballyquintin Point, County Down by SM U-96 (Imperial German Navy) with the loss of eleven of her crew.
Poldown	United Kingdom	World War I: The collier struck a mine and sank in the Atlantic Ocean 2 nautical miles (3.7 km) west south west of Trevose Head, Cornwall (50°31′N 5°05′W) by SM UC-51 (Imperial German Navy) with the loss of eighteen of her crew.
San Blas	Panama	The cargo ship sank at Bocas Town, Bocas del Toro.

== 10 October ==
List of shipwrecks: 10 October 1917
Ship	State	Description
Carl	Imperial German Navy	The three-masted sailing ship was beached and abandoned in Constantine Bay, north Cornwall while being towed to London during a storm.
HMS Bostonian	Royal Navy	World War I: The escort ship was torpedoed and sunk in the English Channel 34 nautical miles (63 km) south by east of Start Point by SM U-53 (Imperial German Navy) with the loss of four crew.
Gowrie	United Kingdom	World War I: The cargo ship was torpedoed and sunk in the English Channel 14 nautical miles (26 km) north east of Cherbourg, Seine-Inférieure, France by SM U-53 (Imperial German Navy). Her crew survived.
Transporteur	France	World War I: The cargo ship was torpedoed and sunk in the Mediterranean Sea 30 nautical miles (56 km) off Malta (35°29′N 14°58′E) by SM U-32 (Imperial German Navy) with the loss of a crew member.
Vagabond	United States	The Yacht went ashore near Saybrook, Connecticut.
HMT Waltham	Royal Navy	The naval trawler was lost on this date.

== 11 October ==
List of shipwrecks: 11 October 1917
Ship	State	Description
Aghios Georgios	Russia	World War I: The ship was sunk in the Black Sea by SM UB-42 (Imperial German Navy).
Baychattan	United Kingdom	World War I: The cargo ship was torpedoed and sunk in the English Channel 0.5 nautical miles (930 m) south south west of Prawle Point, Devon by SM UC-50 (Imperial German Navy). Her crew survived.
Cayo Bonito	United Kingdom	World War I: The cargo ship was torpedoed and sunk in the Gulf of Genoa 4 nautical miles (7.4 km) east north east of Savona, Liguria, Italy (44°14′N 8°30′E) by SM UC-35 (Imperial German Navy) with the loss of six of her crew.
Elve	United Kingdom	World War I: The coaster was shelled and sunk in the Atlantic Ocean off Cape Finisterre, Spain (46°23′N 11°19′W) by SM U-22 (Imperial German Navy). Her 29 crew took to the lifeboats but did not survive.
Italia	Italy	World War I: The cargo ship was sunk in the Gulf of Genoa 4 nautical miles (7.4 km) east north east of Savona (44°14′N 8°30′E) by SM UC-35 (Imperial German Navy).
Joshua	United Kingdom	World War I: The sailing vessel was scuttled in the English Channel west of the Isle of Wight by SM UB-57 (Imperial German Navy) with the loss of three crew.
HMY Kethailes	Royal Navy	The naval yacht collided with SS Leicestershire and sank in the Irish Sea off the Blackwater Lightship (United Kingdom).
Lewis Luckenbach	United States	World War I: The cargo ship was sunk in the English Channel 10 nautical miles (19 km) west of the Île Vierge, Finistère, France (48°47′N 4°43′W) by SM U-53 (Imperial German Navy) with the loss of ten crew.
Lovli	Italy	World War I: The cargo ship was sunk in the Gulf of Genoa (44°14′N 8°29′E) by SM UC-35 (Imperial German Navy).
Mira	United Kingdom	World War I: The tanker struck a mine and sank in the English Channel 4 nautical miles (7.4 km) off Beachy Head, Sussex (50°41′N 0°09′E). Her crew survived.
Panormitis	France	World War I: The sailing vessel was sunk in the Mediterranean Sea off the coast of Egypt by SM UC-74 (Imperial German Navy). Her crew survived.
Rhodesia	United Kingdom	World War I: The cargo ship was torpedoed and sunk in the Bristol Channel 7 nautical miles (13 km) south east by south of the Coningbeg Lightship (United Kingdom) by SM U-61 (Imperial German Navy) with the loss of four crew.

== 12 October ==
List of shipwrecks: 12 October 1917
Ship	State	Description
Cape Corso	United Kingdom	World War I: The cargo ship was torpedoed and damaged in the Irish Sea 9 nautical miles (17 km) off the St. Govan Lightship (United Kingdom) by SM U-57 (Imperial German Navy) with the loss of thirteen crew. Although she subsequently broke her back, she was repaired and returned to service.
Georgios Markettos	Greece	World War I: The cargo ship was sunk in the Irish Sea 4 nautical miles (7.4 km) off the St. Govan Lightship (United Kingdom) by SM U-57 (Imperial German Navy). Her crew survived.
Hirondelle	France	The steamer was lost after running aground off Sark during a voyage from Le Havre to St. Malo and St. Brieux carrying petrol.
"King Harold"	Royal Navy	The 114-foot (35 m) Fishery Reserve trawler was seriously damaged when a 50 Kg barrel of carbide was accidentally smashed in the engine, the resulting gas triggered an explosion that killed 4 crew, and seriously injured the rest of the crew, her Captain and 4 crewmen. She was beached in shoal water off Grimsby to prevent sinking. Sometime after 12 October she was refloated and grounded in the Grimsby Dock Basin. On an unknown date she was salvaged, repaired, and returned to service.
Peebles	United Kingdom	World War I: The cargo ship was torpedoed and sunk in the North Sea 14 nautical miles (26 km) off Flamborough Head, Yorkshire by SM UB-18 (Imperial German Navy). Her crew survived.
Themis	Norway	World War I: The cargo ship was sunk in the Mediterranean Sea 22 nautical miles (41 km) north of Cape Bon, Algeria (37°26′N 11°04′E) by SM UB-51 (Imperial German Navy).
W. M. Barkley	United Kingdom	World War I: The coaster was torpedoed and sunk in the Irish Sea 7 nautical miles (13 km) east of the Kish Lightship (United Kingdom) by SM UC-75 (Imperial German Navy) with the loss of four of her crew.

== 13 October ==
List of shipwrecks: 13 October 1917
Ship	State	Description
Alavi	United Kingdom	World War I: The cargo ship was shelled and sunk in the Mediterranean Sea 6 nautical miles (11 km) north east of Cape Palos, Murcia, Spain (37°40′N 0°34′W) by SM U-35 (Imperial German Navy) with the loss of thirteen crew.
Bethel	Norway	World War I: The sailing vessel was sunk in the North Sea (56°08′N 0°58′E) by SM UB-58 (Imperial German Navy). Her crew survived.
Caprera	Italy	World War I: The cargo ship was sunk in the Atlantic Ocean 60 nautical miles (110 km) west of Casablanca, Morocco (33°53′N 8°45′W) by SM U-151 (Imperial German Navy). Her 45 crew were rescued by Ernesto (Spain).
Despina G. Michalinos	Greece	World War I: The cargo ship was sunk in the Mediterranean Sea off Cartagena, Spain (37°42′N 0°33′W) by SM U-35 (Imperial German Navy).
Doris	Italy	World War I: The cargo ship was sunk in the Mediterranean Sea off Cape Palos (37°46′N 0°38′W) by SM U-35 (Imperial German Navy).
Diu	Portugal	World War I: The cargo ship was sunk in the Atlantic Ocean 4 nautical miles (7.4 km) off the Tuskar Rock, Ireland by SM U-57 (Imperial German Navy).
Eskmere	United Kingdom	World War I: The freighter was torpedoed and sunk in the Irish Sea 15 nautical miles (28 km) west north west of South Stack, Anglesey by SM UC-75 (Imperial German Navy) with the loss of 20 of her crew.
Esmerelda	Sweden	World War I: The barque was sunk in the North Sea by SM UB-58 (Imperial German Navy). Her crew survived.
Lilla	Italy	World War I: The cargo ship was sunk in the Mediterranean Sea off Cartagena (37°45′N 0°38′W) by SM U-35 (Imperial German Navy). Her crew survived.
Woodburn	United Kingdom	World War I: The cargo ship was torpedoed and damaged in the English Channel 3 nautical miles (5.6 km) south east of The Lizard, Cornwall by SM U-62 (Imperial German Navy). She was beached at Falmouth. Later refloated, repaired and returned to service.

== 14 October ==
List of shipwrecks: 14 October 1917
Ship	State	Description
Barbro	Norway	World War I: The cargo ship was sunk in the Atlantic Ocean 13 nautical miles (24 km) north north west of the Île de Batz, Finistère, France (48°55′N 4°14′W) by SM UC-48 (Imperial German Navy) with the loss of two of her crew.
Castro	Greece	World War I: The cargo ship was sunk in the Atlantic Ocean 10 nautical miles (19 km) north north east of Brignogan, Finistère by SM UC-48 (Imperial German Navy). Her crew survived.
HMT Clyde	Royal Navy	The naval trawler collided with another vessel and sank in the English Channel off Sidmouth, Devon.
Delphin	Imperial German Navy	The Vorpostenboot was lost on this date.
Ecaterini C. D.	Greece	World War I: The cargo ship was sunk in the Atlantic Ocean (46°49′N 12°21′W) by SM U-105 (Imperial German Navy).
East Wales	United Kingdom	World War I: The cargo ship was shelled and sunk in the Atlantic Ocean 8 nautical miles (15 km) south by west of Daunts Rock (51°40′N 8°13′W) by SM U-57 (Imperial German Navy) with the loss of three crew.
Grom	Imperial Russian Navy	World War I: The Orfey-class destroyer was shelled and damaged in Moon Sound in the Gulf of Riga by SMS Kaiser and SMS V100 (both Imperial German Navy) and was abandoned. She was captured and taken in tow by V100 but consequently foundered.
Lido G.	Italy	World War I: The coaster was sunk in the Mediterranean Sea north east of Misrata, Libya by SM UC-73 (Imperial German Navy).
Semantha	United Kingdom	World War I: The cargo ship was torpedoed and sunk in the Mediterranean Sea 10 nautical miles (19 km) north west by north of Cape St. John, Crete, Greece by SM UC-74 (Imperial German Navy) with the loss of 32 of her crew.
SM UC-62	Imperial German Navy	World War I: The Type UC II submarine struck a mine and sank in the North Sea off Zeebrugge, West Flanders, Belgium with the loss of all 26 crew.
Valparaiso	Italy	World War I: The cargo ship was torpedoed and sunk off Marsa Susa, Libya (36°56′N 21°58′E) by SM UB-48 (Imperial German Navy). The wreck was raised in 1928 and sold for scrap in January 1930.

== 15 October ==
List of shipwrecks: 15 October 1917
Ship	State	Description
HMT Active III	Royal Navy	World War I: The 81-ton steam minesweeping naval drifter struck a mine laid by SM UC-51 (Imperial German Navy) and sank in the Irish Sea off Milford Haven between Grassholm and Skokholm, Pembrokeshire with the loss of all ten crew.
Barge No. 21	United States	The barge was damaged in a collision with City of Glouchester (flag unknown), and was beached on Naushon Island, Massachusetts.
USS Cassin	United States Navy	World War I: Action of 15 October 1917: The Cassin-class destroyer was torpedoed and damaged in the Atlantic Ocean 20 nautical miles (37 km) south of Mine Head, County Cork, United Kingdom by SM U-61 (Imperial German Navy) with the loss of a crew member. She was taken in tow by HMS Snowdrop (Royal Navy). Subsequently repaired and returned to service.
Champagne	French Navy	World War I: The passenger ship was torpedoed and sunk in the Irish Sea with the loss of 56 lives.
Garthclyde	United Kingdom	World War I: The cargo ship was torpedoed and sunk in the Atlantic Ocean 12 nautical miles (22 km) west of The Lizard, Cornwall (49°55′N 5°30′W) by SM UC-79 (Imperial German Navy). Her crew survived.
Hartburn	United Kingdom	World War I: The cargo ship struck a mine and sank in the English Channel 10 nautical miles (19 km) south of Anvil Point, Dorset with the loss of three of her crew.
Hovde	Norway	World War I: The cargo ship was sunk in the Atlantic Ocean 11 nautical miles (20 km) north west of the Île de Batz, Finistère, France by SM UC-48 (Imperial German Navy) with the loss of a crew member.
Saint Paul	France	World War I: The sailing vessel was shelled and sunk in the Bay of Biscay (46°29′N 10°26′W) by SM U-105 (Imperial German Navy) with the loss of a crew member.
St. Helens	United States	World War I: The cargo ship was sunk in the Atlantic Ocean 100 nautical miles (190 km) west north west of Cape Vilano, Spain (45°57′N 11°19′W) by SM U-105 (Imperial German Navy) with the loss of 24 crew.
White Head	United Kingdom	World War I: The cargo ship was torpedoed and sunk in the Mediterranean Sea 14 nautical miles (26 km) north north east of Suda Bay, Crete, Greece (36°13′N 24°33′E) by SM UC-74 (Imperial German Navy) with the loss of 23 of her crew.

== 16 October ==
List of shipwrecks: 16 October 1917
Ship	State	Description
Est	Imperial Russian Navy	World War I: The cargo ship was sunk in the Baltic Sea off Ekenäs, Finland (59°51′N 23°46′E) by SM UC-60 (Imperial German Navy).
G. B. Parton	United States	The barge sank at Stonington, Connecticut.
Jennie E. Righter	United States	World War I: The three-masted schooner was scuttled after being shelled in the Atlantic Ocean north west of Spain (43°54′N 10°02′W) by SM U-22 (Imperial German Navy). Her crew survived.
SMS T56	Imperial German Navy	The S7-class torpedo boat ran aground and sank in the Baltic Sea.

== 17 October ==
List of shipwrecks: 17 October 1917
Ship	State	Description
Adams	United Kingdom	World War I: The cargo ship was torpedoed and sunk in the English Channel 6 nautical miles (11 km) south east by east of The Lizard, Cornwall (49°54′N 5°04′W) by SM U-62 (Imperial German Navy). Her crew survived.
USAT Antilles	United States Army	World War I: The troopship was torpedoed and damaged in the Bay of Biscay (48°10′N 11°15′W) by SM U-105 (Imperial German Navy) with the loss of 67 lives. Survivors were rescued by USS Corsair (United States Navy) and the ship was scuttled.
California	United Kingdom	World War I: The passenger ship was torpedoed and sunk in the Atlantic Ocean 145 nautical miles (269 km) north north west of Cape Villano, Spain (45°00′N 11°26′W) by SM U-22 (Imperial German Navy) with the loss of four lives.
Dagbjørg	Norway	World War I: Action off Lerwick: The steamship was sunk in the North Sea off Lerwick, Shetland Islands, United Kingdom by German warships. She was on a voyage from Risør to Hartlepool, County Durham, United Kingdom.
Goorkha	Royal Navy	World War I: Mines from SM UC-25 (Imperial German Navy) damaged the British hospital ship off Malta (35°57′N 14°40′E). The ship was towed into Malta, decommissioned and returned to its owners, Union Castle, for repair.
H.Wicander	Sweden	World War I: Action off Lerwick: The cargo ship was shelled and sunk with the loss of sixteen crew off Lerwick. by SMS Bremse and SMS Brummer (both Imperial German Navy).
Habil	Norway	World War I: Action off Lerwick: The coaster was shelled and sunk in the North Sea off Lerwick, Shetland Islands, United Kingdom by SMS Bremse and SMS Brummer (both Imperial German Navy).
Kristine	Norway	World War I: Action off Lerwick: The coaster was shelled and sunk in the North Sea off Lerwick by SMS Bremse and SMS Brummer (both Imperial German Navy) with the loss of ten of her eleven crew.
HMT Jean	Royal Navy	The naval trawler was lost in the Mediterranean Sea on this date.
Manchuria	United Kingdom	World War I: The cargo ship was torpedoed and sunk in the Atlantic Ocean 60 nautical miles (110 km) west of Ouessant, Finistère, France by SM U-53 (Imperial German Navy) with the loss of 26 crew.
Margrethe	Denmark	World War I: Action off Lerwick: The steamship was sunk off Lerwick by German warships.
HMS Mary Rose	Royal Navy	World War I: Action off Lerwick: The M-class destroyer was shelled and sunk in the North Sea off Lerwick by SMS Bremse and SMS Brummer (both Imperial German Navy) with the loss of 88 of her 98 crew.
Nassau	United States	The steamer went ashore in Cherry Harbor, Gardiners Island, New York.
Polvena	United Kingdom	World War I: The cargo ship was torpedoed and sunk in the Atlantic Ocean 25 nautical miles (46 km) north by east of Ouessant (48°55′N 5°10′W) by SM U-53 (Imperial German Navy) with the loss of three crew.
HMT Ruby	Royal Navy	World War I: The naval trawler was torpedoed and sunk in the Atlantic Ocean off Ouessant (48°50′N 5°10′W) by SM UC-79 (Imperial German Navy) with the loss of all eighteen crew.
Silja	Norway	World War I: Action off Lerwick: The cargo ship was shelled and sunk in the North Sea off Lerwick by SMS Bremse and SMS Brummer (both Imperial German Navy).
Slava	Imperial Russian Navy	The wreck of Slava World War I: Battle of Moon Sound: After the battleship SMS König (Imperial German Navy) inflicted heavy damage on her with gunfire, the Borodino-class battleship suffered a magazine explosion and was scuttled by scuttling charges and torpedoeing by Turkmenets-Stavropolsky (Imperial Russian Navy) in Moon Sound off Muhu the coast of Estonia. The wreck was scrapped in 1935.
Sørhaug	Norway	World War I: Action off Lerwick: The cargo ship was shelled and sunk in the North Sea off Lerwick by SMS Bremse and SMS Brummer (both Imperial German Navy).
Stella	Denmark	World War I: Action off Lerwick: The coaster was shelled and sunk in the North Sea off Lerwick by SMS Bremse and SMS Brummer (both Imperial German Navy).
HMS Strongbow	Royal Navy	World War I: Action off Lerwick: The R-class destroyer was shelled and sunk in the North Sea off Lerwick by SMS Bremse and SMS Brummer (both Imperial German Navy) with the loss of 47 of her crew.
Visbur	Sweden	World War I: Action off Lerwick: The cargo ship was shelled and sunk in the North Sea off Lerwick, Shetland Islands, United Kingdom by SMS Bremse and SMS Brummer (both Imperial German Navy). All her crew survived the lifeboat trip back to Norway.

== 18 October ==
List of shipwrecks: 18 October 1917
Ship	State	Description
Altair	Norway	World War I: The cargo ship was torpedoed and sunk in the Atlantic Ocean 8 nautical miles (15 km) north east by north of Newquay, Cornwall, United Kingdom (50°31′N 5°17′W) by SM UC-64 (Imperial German Navy) with the loss of five of her crew.
Amsteldam	United Kingdom	World War I: The cargo ship was torpedoed and sunk in the North Sea 6 nautical miles (11 km) north of Flamborough Head, Yorkshire by SM UB-21 (Imperial German Navy) with the loss of four of her crew.
Anna Scotto	Italy	World War I: The coaster struck a mine and sank in the Mediterranean Sea off Capo Isole delle Correnti, Sicily.
SS Cadmus	United Kingdom	World War I: The cargo ship was torpedoed and sunk in the North Sea 20 nautical miles (37 km) south by east of Flamborough Head by SM UC-47 (Imperial German Navy). Her crew survived.
HMT Comrades	Royal Navy	World War I: The naval trawler struck a mine and sank in the English Channel off Cap d'Antifer, Seine-Inférieure, France by SM UC-65 (Imperial German Navy). Her crew survived.
Itero	Norway	The cargo ship foundered in the Atlantic Ocean 500 nautical miles (930 km) west of Cape Finisterre, Spain. Thirty-one of her crew were rescued by a Spanish fishing vessel.
Lorenzo	Italy	World War I: The cargo ship was sunk in the Atlantic Ocean west of Gibraltar by SM U-35 (Imperial German Navy). Her crew survived.
Macao	Brazil	World War I: The cargo ship was sunk in the Atlantic Ocean 200 nautical miles (370 km) off Cape Finisterre, Spain (45°41′N 10°43′W) by SM U-93 (Imperial German Navy).
Madura	United Kingdom	World War I: The cargo ship was torpedoed and sunk in the Atlantic Ocean 23 nautical miles (43 km) west south west of the Bishop Rock, Isles of Scilly (49°36′N 6°56′W) by SM U-62 (Imperial German Navy) with the loss of three crew.
SMS S64	Imperial German Navy	World War I: The V25-class torpedo boat struck a mine and sank in the Baltic Sea.
Sten	United Kingdom	World War I: The coaster was torpedoed and sunk in the Atlantic Ocean 5 nautical miles (9.3 km) north of the Godrevy Lighthouse, Cornwall (50°19′N 5°26′W) by SM UC-64 (Imperial German Navy) with the loss of nine of her crew.
SMS T66	Imperial German Navy	World War I: The S66-class torpedo boat struck a mine and sank in the Gulf of Riga.
Togston	United Kingdom	World War I: The cargo ship was torpedoed and sunk in the North Sea 20 nautical miles (37 km) south by east of Flamborough Head (53°40′N 0°12′E) by SM UC-47 (Imperial German Navy) with the loss of five of her crew.

== 19 October ==
List of shipwrecks: 19 October 1917
Ship	State	Description
Australdale	Australia	World War I: The cargo ship was torpedoed and sunk in the Mediterranean Sea 165 nautical miles (306 km) north north west of Cape Villano, Spain (45°24′N 11°32′W) by SM U-22 (Imperial German Navy) with the loss of 27 crew.
Britannia	United Kingdom	World War I: The cargo ship was sunk in the English Channel off Portland Bill, Dorset by SM UC-75 (Imperial German Navy) with the loss of all 22 crew.
Camswan	United Kingdom	The cargo ship collided with another vessel and sank. Her crew were rescued.
Cupica	United Kingdom	World War I: The auxiliary barque was shelled and sunk in the Atlantic Ocean 75 nautical miles (139 km) west by south of the Bishop Rock, Isles of Scilly by SM U-107 and SM UC-79 (both Imperial German Navy). Her crew survived.
Eldra	United Kingdom	World War I: The barquentine was scuttled in the English Channel 25 nautical miles (46 km) north west of Le Tréport, Seine-Inférieure, France by SM UC-77 (Imperial German Navy). Her crew survived.
Elsiston	United Kingdom	World War I: The collier was torpedoed and sunk in the Mediterranean Sea 150 nautical miles (280 km) east by south of Malta (35°40′N 17°28′E) by SM U-14 (Austro-Hungarian Navy) with the loss of a crew member.
Gemma	United Kingdom	World War I: The cargo ship was torpedoed and sunk in the North Sea 5 nautical miles (9.3 km) north by west of Flamborough Head, Yorkshire by SM UB-21 (Imperial German Navy) with the loss of four of her crew.
Good Hope	United Kingdom	World War I: The cargo ship was torpedoed and sunk in the Mediterranean Sea 125 nautical miles (232 km) east by south of Malta (35°53′N 17°05′E) by SM U-14 (Austro-Hungarian Navy). Her crew survived.
Harpon	France	World War I: The cargo ship was damaged in the Atlantic Ocean off the coast of Río de Oro (24°22′N 15°50′W) by SM U-151 (Imperial German Navy). She was beached but was declared a constructive total loss. Her crew survived.
Hazelwood	United Kingdom	World War I: The cargo ship struck a mine and sank in the English Channel 8 nautical miles (15 km) south by east of Anvil Point, Dorset with the loss of 32 of her crew.
Ikoma Maru	Japan	World War I: The cargo ship was sunk in the Atlantic Ocean 30 nautical miles (56 km) off Cap Cantin, Morocco by SM U-35 (Imperial German Navy). Her crew survived.
J. L. Luckenbach	United States	World War I: The ocean liner was torpedoed and damaged in the Atlantic Ocean by SM U-62 (Imperial German Navy). She was escorted to Le Havre, Seine-Inférieure, France by the destroyer USS Nicholson (United States Navy). Subsequently repaired and returned to service.
Martha	Denmark	World War I: The barque was shelled and sunk in the North Sea (61°12′N 2°10′W) by SM UB-66 (Imperial German Navy). Her ten crew took to the lifeboats but were not rescued.
HMS Orama	Royal Navy	World War I: The armed merchant cruiser was sunk in the Atlantic Ocean (48°00′N 9°20′W) by SM U-62 (Imperial German Navy) with the loss of five crew. USS Jacob Jones (United States Navy) rescued 305 survivors.
Parkhaven	Netherlands	World War I: The cargo ship was sunk in the North Sea 15 nautical miles (28 km) off the Noord Hinder Lightship (Netherlands) (52°16′N 2°46′E) by SM U-53 (Imperial German Navy).
Pera	United Kingdom	World War I: The collier was torpedoed and sunk in the Mediterranean Sea 105 nautical miles (194 km) east by north of Marsa Susa, Libya (37°16′N 24°00′E) by SM UB-48 (Imperial German Navy) with the loss of a crew member.
Renard	French Navy	World War I: The 135-foot (41.1 m) naval trawler struck a mine and sank in the Atlantic Ocean south east of Ouessant, Finistère (48°28′N 4°58′W) with the loss of eleven of her crew. Survivors were rescued by 260 (French Navy).
Slavonic	Russia	World War I: The cargo ship struck a mine and sank in the North Sea off Lerwick, Shetland Islands, United Kingdom.
Staro	Norway	World War I: The cargo ship was sunk in the Atlantic Ocean (45°00′N 12°07′W) by SM U-22 (Imperial German Navy). Her crew survived.
Teespool	United Kingdom	World War I: The cargo ship was damaged in the English Channel 3 nautical miles (5.6 km) south east of Dartmouth, Devon by SM UB-38 (Imperial German Navy) with the loss of four of her crew. She was beached but was later refloated.
Waikawa	United Kingdom	World War I: The cargo ship was torpedoed and sunk in the English Channel 4 nautical miles (7.4 km) east north east of Start Point, Devon by SM UB-31 (Imperial German Navy). Her crew survived.
War Clover	United Kingdom	World War I: The cargo ship was torpedoed and sunk in the Mediterranean Sea 25 nautical miles (46 km) east north east of Pantellaria, Italy (37°00′N 12°35′E) by SM U-64 (Imperial German Navy) with the loss of fourteen crew.
Wellington	United Kingdom	World War I: the cargo ship was torpedoed and damaged in the English Channel 5 nautical miles (9.3 km) south south east of Portland Bill by SM UB-40 (Imperial German Navy). She was taken in tow by HMT Flo Johnson (Royal Navy and beached at Portland. Later repaired and returned to service.

== 20 October ==
List of shipwrecks: 20 October 1917
Ship	State	Description
Algarve	United Kingdom	World War I: The cargo ship was torpedoed and sunk in the English Channel 15 nautical miles (28 km) south west of Portland Bill, Dorset by SM UB-38 (Imperial German Navy) with the loss of 21 of her crew.
Collegian	United Kingdom	World War I: The collier was torpedoed and sunk in the Mediterranean Sea 100 nautical miles (190 km) north west by north of Alexandria, Egypt (32°35′N 28°41′E) by SM UB-48 (Imperial German Navy). Her crew survived.
Colorado	United Kingdom	World War I: The cargo ship was torpedoed and sunk in the English Channel 1.5 nautical miles (2.8 km) east of Start Point, Devon by SM UB-31 (Imperial German Navy) with the loss of four crew.
Ionian	United Kingdom	World War I: The passenger ship struck a mine and sank in the Irish Sea 2 nautical miles (3.7 km) west of St. Govan's Head, Pembrokeshire (51°35′N 4°59′W) with the loss of seven lives.
Leander	Norway	World War I: The cargo ship was sunk in the North Sea 3.5 nautical miles (6.5 km) north north east of Flamborough Head, Yorkshire, United Kingdom by SM UB-57 (Imperial German Navy) with the loss of a crew member.
Moyori Maru	Japan	World War I: The cargo ship was sunk in the Atlantic Ocean 30 nautical miles (56 km) off Cape Barbas, Morocco (22°17′N 17°14′W) by SM U-151 (Imperial German Navy).
Nitedal	Norway	World War I: The cargo ship was sunk in the North Sea 4 nautical miles (7.4 km) east south east of Flamborough Head by SM UB-57 (Imperial German Navy) with the loss of twelve crew.
Norden	Sweden	World War I: The barque was sunk in the North Sea by SM U-57 (Imperial German Navy). The crew of 12 was not rescued.
Snetinden	Norway	World War I: The cargo ship was sunk in the Atlantic Ocean north west of Spain (45°35′N 11°10′W) by SM U-22 (Imperial German Navy). Her crew survived.
HMT Thomas Stratten	Royal Navy	World War I: The naval trawler struck a mine and sank in the Atlantic Ocean off the Butt of Lewis, Outer Hebrides with the loss of eight crew.
Virginia Gentile	Italy	World War I: The sailing vessel was scuttled in the Malta Channel by SM UC-25 (Imperial German Navy).
HMT Vitality	Royal Navy	World War I: The naval trawler struck a mine and sank in the North Sea off Lowestoft, Suffolk with the loss of two of her crew.

== 21 October ==
List of shipwrecks: 21 October 1917
Ship	State	Description
Anglo Dane	Denmark	World War I: The coaster struck a mine and sank in the North Sea 0.75 nautical miles (1.39 km) off the Bressay Lighthouse, Shetland Islands, United Kingdom with the loss of a crew member.
Bunty	United Kingdom	World War I: The tug struck a mine and sank in the North Sea off Whitby, Yorkshire with the loss of five of her crew.
Flynderborg	Denmark	World War I: The cargo ship was torpedoed and sunk in the North Sea 3 nautical miles (5.6 km) south east of the Bressay Lighthouse by SM UC-40 (Imperial German Navy). Her crew survived.
Gryfevale	United Kingdom	World War I: The cargo ship was shelled and sunk in the Atlantic Ocean 10 nautical miles (19 km) off Cap Blanc, Mauritania (21°08′N 17°04′W) by SM U-151 (Imperial German Navy). Her crew survived.
HMS Marmion	Royal Navy	The Admiralty M-class destroyer collided with HMS Tirade (Royal Navy) and sank off the Shetland Islands.
SMS T66	Imperial German Navy	World War I: The S66-class torpedo boat struck a mine and was damaged in the North Sea off the Belgian coast. She was consequently found to be a total loss.
Tom Roper	United Kingdom	World War I: The topsail schooner was scuttled in the English Channel 20 nautical miles (37 km) south south east of Start Point by SM UC-79 (Imperial German Navy) with the loss of a crew member.

== 22 October ==
List of shipwrecks: 22 October 1917
Ship	State	Description
HMS C32	Royal Navy	World War I: The C-class submarine ran aground in the Gulf of Riga and was scuttled.
SMS Gluckstadt	Imperial German Navy	The naval drifter/Vorpostenboot was lost on this date.
SMS Gutheil	Imperial German Navy	The naval drifter/Vorpostenboot was lost on this date.
Novillo	Denmark	World War I: The cargo ship was sunk in the North Sea 8 nautical miles (15 km) north of Scarborough, Yorkshire, United Kingdom by SM UB-57 (Imperial German Navy) with the loss of four crew.
Zillah	United Kingdom	World War I: The cargo ship was torpedoed and sunk in the Barents Sea 25 nautical miles (46 km) north east of Kildin Island, Russia by SM U-46 (Imperial German Navy) with the loss of eighteen crew.

== 23 October ==
List of shipwrecks: 23 October 1917
Ship	State	Description
Capo di Monte	Italy	World War I: The cargo ship was sunk in the Mediterranean Sea 100 nautical miles (190 km) west of Heraklion, Crete, Greece (34°53′N 19°50′E) by SM U-14 (Austro-Hungarian Navy).
Catherine Horan	United States	The barge was wrecked at Green Hill, Rhode Island.
Corne	French Navy	The naval trawler was lost on this date.
HMT Earl Lennox	Royal Navy	World War I: The naval trawler struck a mine and sank south of Islay Sound (55°45′N 5°57′W) with the loss of seven crew.
Katahdin	United States	The steamer was sunk in a collision with Tokoyama Maru (Japan) in the Delaware River at Chester, Pennsylvania. Later salvage probably abandoned. One killed.
Monitor	United States	The steamer was sunk in the Monongahela River one mile (1.6 km) above Lock No. 4 in a collision with barges under the tow of Duquesne (United States). At least one crewman was killed. Monitor was raised, repaired and returned to service on 20 February 1918.
Perim	United Kingdom	The cargo ship collided with another British merchant ship and sank in the Mediterranean Sea off Barcelona, Spain.
Seistan	United Kingdom	World War I: The collier was torpedoed and sunk in the North Sea 3.5 nautical miles (6.5 km) north by west of Flamborough Head, Yorkshire (54°09′N 0°08′W) by SM UB-57 (Imperial German Navy) with the loss of five of her crew.
Tredegar Hall	United Kingdom	World War I: The cargo ship was torpedoed and sunk in the North Sea 4.5 nautical miles (8.3 km) east south east of Flamborough Head by SM UB-57 (Imperial German Navy) with the loss of three of her crew.

== 24 October ==
List of shipwrecks: 24 October 1917
Ship	State	Description
Allison White	United States	The Barge went on the rocks at The Dumplings near Jamestown, Rhode Island, or sank off Jamestown. Abandoned by owners.
Catherine Horan	United States	The barge went ashore at Green Hill, Rhode Island. Probably abandoned after unsuccessful salvage attempts.
SMS F3	Imperial German Navy	The F Type minesweeping boat was lost on this date.
Franklin	United Kingdom	The ship capsized off The Mumbles, Glamorgan with the loss of four of her thirteen crew. Survivors were rescued by the pilot cutter Beaufort (United Kingdom). The wreck was raised in April 1918.
Gallia	Italy	World War I: The cargo ship was sunk in the English Channel 24 nautical miles (44 km) west north west of Portland Bill, Dorset, United Kingdom by SM UB-40 (Imperial German Navy). Her crew survived.
Henry R. Carter	United States	The barge went ashore at Woodmont, Connecticut.
Ilderton	United Kingdom	World War I: The cargo ship was torpedoed and sunk in the Barents Sea 35 nautical miles (65 km) north east of Kildin Island, Russia (69°46′N 35°24′E) by SM U-46 (Imperial German Navy). Her crew survived.
John H. Ryerson	United States	The barge capsized and went ashore at Woodmont, Connecticut.
John J. Guinan	United States	The barge went ashore at Woodmont, Connecticut.
John P. Curry	United States	The barge capsized and went ashore at Woodmont, Connecticut.
Novington	United Kingdom	World War I: The cargo ship was torpedoed and damaged in the North Sea 25 nautical miles (46 km) east of Bard Island, Shetland Islands by SM UC-40 (Imperial German Navy). She was beached but was later refloated.
Ulfsborg	Denmark	World War I: The cargo ship was sunk in the Bay of Biscay (46°03′N 1°43′W) by SM UC-63 (Imperial German Navy) with the loss of seventeen of her crew.
Wilson	United States	The barge capsized and went ashore at Woodmont, Connecticut.
Woron	Russia	World War I: The cargo ship was torpedoed and sunk in the North Sea 25 nautical miles (46 km) north east of Lerwick, Shetland Islands by SM UC-40 (Imperial German Navy).

== 25 October ==
List of shipwrecks: 25 October 1917
Ship	State	Description
SMS A32	Imperial German Navy	The A25-class torpedo boat ran aground and sank in the Baltic Sea.
Altair	Imperial German Navy	World War I: The Aldebaran-class Vorpostenboot was sunk by mines in Tagga Bight.
Erviken	Norway	World War I: The cargo ship was torpedoed and sunk in the Mediterranean Sea four nautical miles (7.4 km) south east of Cabo de Gata, Spain by SM U-64 (Imperial German Navy) with the loss of a crew member.
Euston	United Kingdom	World War I: The collier was torpedoed and sunk in the Mediterranean Sea 37 nautical miles (69 km) south west of Cape Matapan, Greece (35°33′N 21°48′E) by SM UC-34 (Imperial German Navy) with the loss of a crew member.
Fannie Prescott	United States	World War I: The schooner was sunk in the Atlantic Ocean 50 nautical miles (93 km) south of Cape Cantin, Morocco by SM U-35 (Imperial German Navy).
Gefion	United Kingdom	World War I: The cargo ship was torpedoed and sunk in the English Channel 10 nautical miles (19 km) north east of Berry Head, Devon by SM UB-40 (Imperial German Navy) with the loss of two of her crew.
Ness	United Kingdom	World War I: The cargo ship was shelled and sunk in the Mediterranean Sea 10 nautical miles (19 km) south east of Cabo de Gata by SM U-64 (Imperial German Navy) with the loss of two of her crew.
Northern Lights	United States	One half of the steamer went ashore on Lake Ontario during a storm. She had been cut in half to allow passage through the Welland Canal to go to the Atlantic Ocean and the cable tying the two-halves together parted in the storm.
Sheaf Blade	United Kingdom	World War I: The cargo ship was torpedoed and sunk in the Mediterranean Sea 13 nautical miles (24 km) south east by south of Cabo de Gata by SM U-64 (Imperial German Navy) with the loss of two of her crew.
Wearside	United Kingdom	World War I: The cargo ship struck a mine and sank in the North Sea 3 nautical miles (5.6 km) off the Sunk Lightship (United Kingdom). Her crew survived.

== 26 October ==
List of shipwrecks: 26 October 1917
Ship	State	Description
SMS Eber	Imperial German Navy	World War I: The Iltis-class gunboat was scuttled at Bahia, Brazil, where she had been interned since September, 1914.
Helen	United States	The 17-gross register ton, 48-foot (14.6 m) fishing vessel was wrecked near Level Island (56°28′N 133°05′W) in Southeast Alaska. Her crew of two survived.
Le Tarn	France	World War I: The cargo ship was sunk in the Mediterranean Sea east of Oran, Algeria (36°15′N 0°03′W) by SM U-64 (Imperial German Navy). Her crew survived.
Petropavlovsk	Imperial Russian Navy	The Gangut-class battleship ran aground. She was refloated on 12 November with assistance from Gangut (Imperial Russian Navy).
Sapele	United Kingdom	World War I: The cargo ship was torpedoed and sunk in the Atlantic Ocean 100 nautical miles (190 km) north west of Tory Island, County Donegal (55°56′N 11°00′W) by SM U-104 (Imperial German Navy) with the loss of three crew.
SMS T65	Imperial German Navy	World War I: The S7-class torpedo boat struck a mine and sank in the Baltic Sea.

== 27 October ==
List of shipwrecks: 27 October 1917
Ship	State	Description
D. N. Luckenbach	United States	World War I: The cargo ship was sunk in the Atlantic Ocean (46°34′N 8°34′W) by SM U-93 (Imperial German Navy) with the loss of five of her crew.
Lady Helen	United Kingdom	World War I: The coaster was sunk in the North Sea off Robin Hood's Bay, Yorkshire by SM UB-34 (Imperial German Navy) with the loss of seven of her crew.
HMT Strymon	Royal Navy	World War I: The naval trawler struck a naval mine and sank in the North Sea off the Shipwash Lightship (United Kingdom) (51°37′N 0°48′E) with the loss of eleven of her crew.

== 28 October ==
List of shipwrecks: 28 October 1917
Ship	State	Description
Baron Balfour	United Kingdom	World War I: The cargo ship was torpedoed and sunk in the Barents Sea 8 nautical miles (15 km) north of Sem Island, Russia by SM U-46 (Imperial German Navy). Her crew survived.
Baron Garioch	United Kingdom	World War I: The cargo ship was torpedoed and sunk in the English Channel 5 nautical miles (9.3 km) south east of Anvil Point, Dorset (50°36′N 1°43′W) by SM UC-63 (Imperial German Navy) with the loss of two of her crew.
Ferrona	United Kingdom	World War I: The cargo ship was scuttled in the Mediterranean Sea 7 nautical miles (13 km) north east of Valencia, Spain (39°28′N 0°10′W) by SM U-64 (Imperial German Navy) with the loss of a crew member.
USAT Finland	United States Army	USAT Finland World War I: The troopship was torpedoed and damaged in the Atlantic Ocean 150 nautical miles (280 km) off Brest, Finistère, France (46°21′N 6°30′W) by SM U-93 (Imperial German Navy) with the loss of nine of her crew.
Gepard	Imperial Russian Navy	World War I: The Bars-class submarine was sunk in the Baltic Sea, probably by a mine.
Marc Fraissinet	France	World War I: The cargo ship was torpedoed and sunk in the Mediterranean Sea 15 nautical miles (28 km) north of Tabarka, Tunisia (37°01′N 8°37′E) by SM UB-50 (Imperial German Navy) with the loss of a crew member.
Redesmere	United Kingdom	World War I: The collier was torpedoed and sunk in the English Channel 6 nautical miles (11 km) west south west of St. Catherine's Point, Isle of Wight by SM UB-40 (Imperial German Navy) with the loss of nineteen of her crew.
Senegal	Italy	World War I: The coaster was torpedoed and sunk in the Mediterranean Sea south of Sardinia (37°58′N 8°57′E) by SM UB-50 (Imperial German Navy) with the loss of two of her crew.
SP #3	United States	The 31-ton scow was wrecked on Key Reef (56°09′35″N 132°49′45″W) in Clarence Strait in the Alexander Archipelago in Southeast Alaska.

== 29 October ==
List of shipwrecks: 29 October 1917
Ship	State	Description
La Epoca	Uruguay	World War I: The barque was scuttled in the Bay of Biscay 30 nautical miles (56 km) south west of the Cordouan Lighthouse, Gironde, France by SM U-93 (Imperial German Navy).
SMS M68	Imperial German Navy	World War I: The Type 1916 minesweeper struck a mine and sank at Dunamunde.
Marne	France	World War I: The coaster was sunk in the English Channel 25 nautical miles (46 km) north east of Barfleur, Manche (50°30′N 1°20′W) by SM UC-63 (Imperial German Navy).
Namur	United Kingdom	World War I: The passenger ship was torpedoed and sunk in the Mediterranean Sea 55 nautical miles (102 km) east by south of Gibraltar (36°00′N 4°15′W) by SM U-35 (Imperial German Navy) with the loss of a crew member.

== 30 October ==
List of shipwrecks: 30 October 1917
Ship	State	Description
SMS Kehrewider	Imperial German Navy	The naval drifter/Vorpostenboot was lost on this date.
Liff	Norway	World War I: The cargo ship was sunk in the Bay of Biscay 70 nautical miles (130 km) west of Penmarc'h, Finistère, France (47°37′N 5°13′W) by SM U-93 (Imperial German Navy). Her crew survived.

== 31 October ==
List of shipwrecks: 31 October 1917
Ship	State	Description
Cambric	United Kingdom	World War I: The cargo ship was torpedoed and sunk in the Mediterranean Sea 14 nautical miles (26 km) west of Cape Cherchell, Algeria by SM U-35 (Imperial German Navy) with the loss of 24 crew.
Estrellano	United Kingdom	World War I: Convoy T 340: The cargo ship was torpedoed and sunk in the Bay of Biscay 14 nautical miles (26 km) west by north of the Île du Pilier, Vendée, France (47°04′N 2°40′W) by SM UC-71 (Imperial German Navy) with the loss of three of her crew. Survivors were rescued by La Batailleuse (French Navy).
Evangelistra	Greece	World War I: The sailing vessel was sunk in the Mediterranean Sea east of Crete (35°49′N 24°05′E) by SM UC-37 (Imperial German Navy).
Hamidabad	Ottoman Navy	World War I: The Demirhisar-class torpedo boat was sunk at Port Igneada by Russian aircraft and Bystry and Pylkiy (both Imperial Russian Navy).
North Sea	United Kingdom	World War I: The cargo ship was torpedoed and sunk in the English Channel 2.5 nautical miles (4.6 km) south west of Prawle Point, Devon by SM UC-65 (Imperial German Navy) with the loss of a crew member.
Phare	United Kingdom	World War I: The cargo ship was torpedoed and sunk in the North Sea 2.5 nautical miles (4.6 km) north of Scarborough, Yorkshire by SM UB-35 (Imperial German Navy) with the loss of fourteen of her crew.
Saint David	United States	The 1,576-ton ore barge was being towed by the tug Kern (United States) when the towline parted. She drifted onto Khantaak Island (59°36′N 139°46′W) near Yakutat, Territory of Alaska, where the surf pounded her to pieces.
South Bay	United States	The dredger foundered in the Atlantic Ocean off Tampico, Florida.

== Unknown date ==
List of shipwrecks: Unknown date 1917
Ship	State	Description
HMS Begonia	Royal Navy	World War I: The Azalea-class sloop, in use as a Q-ship, collided with the submarine SM U-151 (Imperial German Navy) and sank in the Atlantic Ocean off Casablanca, French Morocco, on 2 or 12 October.
Hunter	United States	The 8-ton, 32.2-foot (9.8 m) fishing vessel sank with the loss of both people on board in Taku Harbor on the eastern shore of Stephens Passage in the Alexander Archipelago in Southeast Alaska.
Kerry Range	Royal Navy	The armed transport was scuttled after catching fire at Baltimore, Maryland, with the loss of three lives. She was refloated, repaired, and returned to service.
Toledo	United Kingdom	World War I: The cargo ship was scuttled in the Baltic Sea to avoid capture by the Germans.
SM UC-16	Imperial German Navy	World War I: The Type UC II submarine struck a mine and sank in the North Sea off Zeebrugge, West Flanders, Belgium with the loss of all 26 crew.
