= German submarine U-79 =

U-79 may refer to one of the following German submarines:

- SM U-79, a Type UE I submarine launched in 1916 and that served in World War I until surrendered 21 November 1918; became the French submarine Victor Reveille; broken up in 1935
  - During World War I, Germany also had these submarines with similar names:
    - SM UB-79, a Type UB III submarine launched in 1917 and surrendered on 26 November 1918; broken up at Swansea in 1922
    - SM UC-79, a Type UC II submarine launched in 1916 and sunk after 5 April 1918
- German submarine U-79, a Type VIIC submarine that served in World War II until sunk on 23 December 1941
- The number SM U-79 in the Austro-Hungarian Navy was assigned to SM UB-49 when serving in the Mediterranean during World War I.
