= U79 =

U79 may refer to:

- Chamberlain USFS Airport in Idaho County, Idaho, United States
- German submarine U-79, various vessels
- HMIS Clive (U79), a sloop of the Royal Indian Navy
- Small nucleolar RNA SNORD79
- U79, a line of the Düsseldorf Stadtbahn
