= SM UC-25 =

German submarine

History

German Empire
- Name: UC-25
- Ordered: 29 August 1915
- Builder: AG Vulcan, Hamburg
- Yard number: 64
- Launched: 10 June 1916
- Commissioned: 28 June 1916
- Fate: Scuttled at Pola, 28 October 1918

General characteristics
- Class & type: Type UC II submarine
- Displacement: 400 t (390 long tons), surfaced; 480 t (470 long tons), submerged
- Length: 49.45 m (162 ft 3 in) o/a; 39.30 m (128 ft 11 in) pressure hull
- Beam: 5.22 m (17 ft 2 in) o/a; 3.65 m (12 ft) pressure hull
- Draught: 3.68 m (12 ft 1 in)
- Propulsion: 2 × propeller shafts; 2 × 6-cylinder, 4-stroke diesel engines, 500 PS (370 kW; 490 bhp); 2 × electric motors, 460 PS (340 kW; 450 shp)
- Speed: 11.6 knots (21.5 km/h; 13.3 mph), surfaced; 6.6 knots (12.2 km/h; 7.6 mph), submerged
- Range: 9,260 nmi (17,150 km; 10,660 mi) at 7 knots (13 km/h; 8.1 mph), surfaced; 53 nmi (98 km; 61 mi) at 4 knots (7.4 km/h; 4.6 mph), submerged
- Test depth: 50 m (160 ft)
- Complement: 26
- Armament: 6 × 100 cm (39.4 in) mine tubes; 18 × UC 200 mines; 3 × 50 cm (19.7 in) torpedo tubes (2 bow/external; one stern); 7 × torpedoes; 1 × 8.8 cm (3.5 in) Uk L/30 deck gun
- Notes: 48-second diving time

Service record
- Part of: Baltic Flotilla; 12 September 1916 – 15 April 1917; Pola / Mittelmeer / Mittelmeer II Flotilla; 15 April 1917 – 11 November 1918
- Commanders: Kptlt. Johannes Feldkirchner; 28 June 1916 – 17 July 1917; Oblt.z.S. Walter Lippold; 18 July – 13 December 1917; Oblt.z.S. Freiherr Ernst von Wangenheim; 14 December 1917 – 15 February 1918; Oblt.z.S. Karl Dönitz; 16 February – 7 August 1918
- Operations: 13 patrols
- Victories: 17 merchant ships sunk (16,872 GRT); 3 warships sunk (2,201 tons); 1 auxiliary warship sunk (255 GRT); 4 merchant ships damaged (22,035 GRT); 2 warships damaged (6,500 tons); 1 auxiliary warship damaged (6,335 GRT)

SM UC-25 was a German Type UC II minelaying submarine or U-boat in the German Imperial Navy (German: Kaiserliche Marine) during World War I. The U-boat was ordered on 29 August 1915 and was launched on 10 June 1916. She was commissioned into the German Imperial Navy on 28 June 1916 as SM UC-25. (Note: "SM" stands for "Seiner Majestät" (English: His Majesty's) and combined with the U for Unterseeboot would be translated as His Majesty's Submarine.) In 13 patrols UC-25 was credited with sinking 21 ships, either by torpedo or by mines laid. From March to September 1918, she was commanded by Karl Dönitz, later grand admiral in charge of all U-boats in World War II. UC-25 was scuttled at Pola on 28 October 1918 on the surrender of Austria-Hungary.

== Design ==
A Type UC II submarine, UC-25 had a displacement of 400 tonnes (390 long tons) when at the surface and 480 tonnes (470 long tons) while submerged. She had a length overall of 49.45 m (162 ft 3 in), a beam of 5.22 m (17 ft 2 in), and a draught of 3.68 m (12 ft 1 in). The submarine was powered by two six-cylinder four-stroke diesel engines each producing 250 metric horsepower (180 kW; 250 shp) (a total of 500 metric horsepower (370 kW; 490 shp)), two electric motors producing 460 metric horsepower (340 kW; 450 shp), and two propeller shafts. She had a dive time of 48 seconds and was capable of operating at a depth of 50 metres (160 ft).

The submarine had a maximum surface speed of 11.6 knots (21.5 km/h; 13.3 mph) and a submerged speed of 6.6 knots (12.2 km/h; 7.6 mph). When submerged, she could operate for 53 nautical miles (98 km; 61 mi) at 4 knots (7.4 km/h; 4.6 mph); when surfaced, she could travel 9,260 nautical miles (17,150 km; 10,660 mi) at 7 knots (13 km/h; 8.1 mph). UC-25 was fitted with six 100 centimetres (39 in) mine tubes, eighteen UC 200 mines, three 50 centimetres (20 in) torpedo tubes (one on the stern and two on the bow), seven torpedoes, and one 8.8 cm (3.5 in) Uk L/30 deck gun. Her complement was twenty-six crew members.

== Summary of raiding history ==
Date	Name	Nationality	Tonnage (Note: Merchant ship tonnages are in gross register tons. Military vessels are listed by tons displacement.)	Fate
19 October 1916	Jug	Russian Empire	75	Sunk
6 December 1916	Shchit	Imperial Russian Navy	248	Sunk
6 April 1917	Cybele	France	148	Sunk
7 April 1917	Edwin R. Hunt	United States	1,132	Sunk
28 April 1917	Juliette	France	50	Sunk
15 May 1917	Boutefeu	French Navy	703	Sunk
16 May 1917	HMS Dartmouth	Royal Navy	5,250	Damaged
24 May 1917	Domenico Barone	Kingdom of Italy	171	Sunk
28 May 1917	Nuovo S. Giovanni	Kingdom of Italy	31	Sunk
28 May 1917	San Domenico	Kingdom of Italy	27	Sunk
31 May 1917	Ninotto	Kingdom of Italy	208	Sunk
1 June 1917	Domenico Miscuraca	Kingdom of Italy	194	Sunk
1 June 1917	Vittoria	Kingdom of Italy	248	Sunk
6 June 1917	Mitra	United Kingdom	5,592	Damaged
4 July 1917	HMS Aster	Royal Navy	1,250	Sunk
4 July 1917	HMS Azalea	Royal Navy	1,250	Damaged
5 July 1917	Eburna	United Kingdom	4,735	Damaged
17 October 1917	HMHS Goorkha	Royal Navy	6,335	Damaged
18 October 1917	Anna Scotto	Kingdom of Italy	594	Sunk
20 October 1917	Virginia Gentile	Kingdom of Italy	164	Sunk
3 December 1917	Melo	Kingdom of Italy	1,115	Sunk
8 December 1917	Chyebassa	United Kingdom	6,249	Damaged
23 February 1918	HMT Marion	Royal Navy	255	Sunk
18 March 1918	Massilia	Kingdom of Italy	5,026	Sunk
4 April 1918	Agatina	Kingdom of Italy	201	Sunk
28 July 1918	Vesuvio	Kingdom of Italy	5,459	Damaged
29 July 1918	Rio Pallaresa	United Kingdom	4,043	Sunk
5 August 1918	Freshfield	Canada	3,445	Sunk
