= SM UC-28 =

German Type UC II minelaying U-boat

History

German Empire
- Name: UC-28
- Ordered: 29 August 1915
- Builder: AG Vulcan, Hamburg
- Yard number: 67
- Launched: 8 July 1916
- Commissioned: 6 August 1916
- Fate: Surrendered, 12 February 1919; broken up

General characteristics
- Class & type: Type UC II submarine
- Displacement: 400 t (390 long tons), surfaced; 480 t (470 long tons), submerged
- Length: 49.45 m (162 ft 3 in) o/a; 39.30 m (128 ft 11 in) pressure hull
- Beam: 5.22 m (17 ft 2 in) o/a; 3.65 m (12 ft 0 in) pressure hull
- Draught: 3.68 m (12 ft 1 in)
- Propulsion: 2 × propeller shafts; 2 × 6-cylinder, 4-stroke diesel engines, 520 PS (380 kW; 510 bhp); 2 × electric motors, 460 PS (340 kW; 450 shp)
- Speed: 11.6 knots (21.5 km/h; 13.3 mph), surfaced; 6.6 knots (12.2 km/h; 7.6 mph), submerged
- Range: 9,410 nmi (17,430 km; 10,830 mi) at 7 knots (13 km/h; 8.1 mph), surfaced; 53 nmi (98 km; 61 mi) at 4 knots (7.4 km/h; 4.6 mph), submerged
- Test depth: 50 m (160 ft)
- Complement: 26
- Armament: 6 × 100 cm (39.4 in) mine tubes; 18 × UC 200 mines; 3 × 50 cm (19.7 in) torpedo tubes (2 bow/external; one stern); 7 × torpedoes; 1 × 8.8 cm (3.5 in) Uk L/30 deck gun
- Notes: 48-second diving time

Service record
- Part of: Training Flotilla; Unknown – 11 November 1918
- Commanders: Oblt.z.S. Theodor Schultz; 6 August 1916 - Unknown
- Operations: No patrols
- Victories: None

SM UC-28 was a German Type UC II minelaying submarine or U-boat in the German Imperial Navy (German: Kaiserliche Marine) during World War I. The U-boat was ordered on 29 August 1915 and was launched on 8 July 1916. She was commissioned into the German Imperial Navy on 6 August 1916 as SM UC-28. (Note: "SM" stands for "Seiner Majestät" (English: His Majesty's) and combined with the U for Unterseeboot would be translated as His Majesty's Submarine.) In 0 patrols UC-28 sank no ships. UC-28 surrendered to France on 12 February 1919 and was broken up.

== Design ==
A Type UC II submarine, UC-28 had a displacement of 400 tonnes (390 long tons) when at the surface and 480 tonnes (470 long tons) while submerged. She had a length overall of 49.45 m (162 ft 3 in), a beam of 5.22 m (17 ft 2 in), and a draught of 3.68 m (12 ft 1 in). The submarine was powered by two six-cylinder four-stroke diesel engines each producing 260 metric horsepower (190 kW; 260 shp) (a total of 520 metric horsepower (380 kW; 510 shp)), two electric motors producing 460 metric horsepower (340 kW; 450 shp), and two propeller shafts. She had a dive time of 48 seconds and was capable of operating at a depth of 50 metres (160 ft).

The submarine had a maximum surface speed of 11.6 knots (21.5 km/h; 13.3 mph) and a submerged speed of 6.7 knots (12.4 km/h; 7.7 mph). When submerged, she could operate for 53 nautical miles (98 km; 61 mi) at 4 knots (7.4 km/h; 4.6 mph); when surfaced, she could travel 9,410 nautical miles (17,430 km; 10,830 mi) at 7 knots (13 km/h; 8.1 mph). UC-28 was fitted with six 100 centimetres (39 in) mine tubes, eighteen UC 200 mines, three 50 centimetres (20 in) torpedo tubes (one on the stern and two on the bow), seven torpedoes, and one 8.8 cm (3.5 in) Uk L/30 deck gun. Her complement was twenty-six crew members.
