= SM UC-40 =

German Type UC II minelaying U-boat

Coordinates: 54°55′N 0°6′E

History

German Empire
- Name: UC-40
- Ordered: 20 November 1915
- Builder: AG Vulcan, Hamburg
- Yard number: 73
- Launched: 5 September 1916
- Commissioned: 1 October 1916
- Fate: Sank while on way to surrender, 21 January 1919

General characteristics
- Class & type: Type UC II submarine
- Displacement: 400 t (390 long tons), surfaced; 480 t (470 long tons), submerged
- Length: 49.45 m (162 ft 3 in) o/a; 40.30 m (132 ft 3 in) pressure hull
- Beam: 5.22 m (17 ft 2 in) o/a; 3.65 m (12 ft) pressure hull
- Draught: 3.68 m (12 ft 1 in)
- Propulsion: 2 × propeller shafts; 2 × 6-cylinder, 4-stroke diesel engines, 520 PS (380 kW; 510 shp); 2 × electric motors, 460 PS (340 kW; 450 shp)
- Speed: 11.7 knots (21.7 km/h; 13.5 mph), surfaced; 6.7 knots (12.4 km/h; 7.7 mph), submerged
- Range: 9,410 nmi (17,430 km; 10,830 mi) at 7 knots (13 km/h; 8.1 mph) surfaced; 60 nmi (110 km; 69 mi) at 4 knots (7.4 km/h; 4.6 mph) submerged
- Test depth: 50 m (160 ft)
- Complement: 26
- Armament: 6 × 100 cm (39.4 in) mine tubes; 18 × UC 200 mines; 3 × 50 cm (19.7 in) torpedo tubes (2 bow/external; one stern); 7 × torpedoes; 1 × 8.8 cm (3.5 in) Uk L/30 deck gun
- Notes: 48-second diving time

Service record
- Part of: I Flotilla; 15 December 1916 – 24 September 1918; Flandern I Flotilla; 24 September – 11 October 1918; I Flotilla; 11 October – 11 November 1918
- Commanders: Oblt.z.S. Gustav Deuerlich; 1 October 1916 – 15 August 1917; Oblt.z.S. / Kptlt. Hermann Menzel; 16 August 1917 – 7 August 1918; Lt.z.S. Bernhard Wischhausen; 9 August – 11 November 1918
- Operations: 17 patrols
- Victories: 24 merchant ships sunk (39,698 GRT); 6 auxiliary warships sunk (3,149 GRT); 7 merchant ships damaged (25,876 GRT); 1 warship damaged (1,300 tons)

SM UC-40 was a German Type UC II minelaying submarine or U-boat in the German Imperial Navy (German: Kaiserliche Marine) during World War I. The U-boat was ordered on 20 November 1915 and was launched on 5 September 1916. She was commissioned into the German Imperial Navy on 1 October 1916 as SM UC-40. (Note: "SM" stands for "Seiner Majestät" (English: His Majesty's) and combined with the U for Unterseeboot would be translated as His Majesty's Submarine.) In 17 patrols UC-40 was credited with sinking 30 ships, either by torpedo or by mines laid. UC-40 was being taken to surrender but foundered in the North Sea en route on 21 January 1919.

== Design ==
A Type UC II submarine, UC-40 had a displacement of 400 tonnes (390 long tons) when at the surface and 480 tonnes (470 long tons) while submerged. She had a length overall of 49.45 m (162 ft 3 in), a beam of 5.22 m (17 ft 2 in), and a draught of 3.68 m (12 ft 1 in). The submarine was powered by two six-cylinder four-stroke diesel engines each producing 260 metric horsepower (190 kW; 260 shp) (a total of 520 metric horsepower (380 kW; 510 shp)), two electric motors producing 460 metric horsepower (340 kW; 450 shp), and two propeller shafts. She had a dive time of 48 seconds and was capable of operating at a depth of 50 metres (160 ft).

The submarine had a maximum surface speed of 11.7 knots (21.7 km/h; 13.5 mph) and a submerged speed of 6.7 knots (12.4 km/h; 7.7 mph). When submerged, she could operate for 60 nautical miles (110 km; 69 mi) at 4 knots (7.4 km/h; 4.6 mph); when surfaced, she could travel 9,410 nautical miles (17,430 km; 10,830 mi) at 7 knots (13 km/h; 8.1 mph). UC-40 was fitted with six 100 centimetres (39 in) mine tubes, eighteen UC 200 mines, three 50 centimetres (20 in) torpedo tubes (one on the stern and two on the bow), seven torpedoes, and one 8.8 cm (3.5 in) Uk L/30 deck gun. Her complement was twenty-six crew members.

== Summary of raiding history ==
Date	Name	Nationality	Tonnage (Note: Merchant ship tonnages are in gross register tons. Military vessels are listed by tons displacement.)	Fate
22 January 1917	Kamma	Sweden	1,516	Sunk
28 March 1917	Hero	United Kingdom	66	Sunk
1 April 1917	Bergenhus	Denmark	1,017	Sunk
6 April 1917	Presto	United Kingdom	1,143	Sunk
10 May 1917	HMT Lord Ridley	Royal Navy	215	Sunk
23 May 1917	Gran	Norway	1,153	Sunk
25 June 1917	HMT Gelsina	Royal Navy	227	Sunk
30 July 1917	Amor	Denmark	196	Sunk
6 August 1917	Polanna	United Kingdom	2,345	Sunk
8 September 1917	Family’s Pride	United Kingdom	39	Sunk
9 September 1917	Swiftsure	United Kingdom	823	Sunk
10 September 1917	Margarita	United Kingdom	2,788	Damaged
10 September 1917	Parkmill	United Kingdom	1,316	Sunk
12 September 1917	HMT Asia	Royal Navy	309	Sunk
12 September 1917	Glenelg	United Kingdom	4,160	Damaged
11 October 1917	Voronezh	Russian Empire	5,331	Damaged
19 October 1917	Slavonic	Russian Empire	3,604	Sunk
21 October 1917	Anglo Dane	Denmark	808	Sunk
21 October 1917	Flynderborg	Denmark	1,400	Sunk
24 October 1917	Novington	United Kingdom	3,442	Damaged
24 October 1917	Woron	Russian Empire	3,342	Sunk
8 December 1917	HMS Grive	Royal Navy	2,037	Sunk
12 December 1917	Leonatus	United Kingdom	2,099	Sunk
8 March 1918	Corsham	United Kingdom	2,760	Sunk
8 March 1918	Intent	United Kingdom	1,564	Sunk
10 March 1918	HMT Columba	Royal Navy	138	Sunk
14 March 1918	Castleford	United Kingdom	1,741	Sunk
28 April 1918	HMT Emley	Royal Navy	223	Sunk
28 April 1918	Upcerne	United Kingdom	2,984	Sunk
8 June 1918	Eros	United Kingdom	181	Sunk
12 June 1918	Afrique	France	2,457	Sunk
15 June 1918	Cairnmona	United Kingdom	4,666	Damaged
16 June 1918	Melanie	United Kingdom	2,996	Sunk
23 July 1918	HMS Vanity	Royal Navy	1,300	Damaged
26 July 1918	Blairhall	United Kingdom	2,549	Sunk
27 July 1918	Crimdon	Sweden	1,599	Sunk
30 July 1918	War Deer	United Kingdom	5,323	Damaged
3 August 1918	Skjold	Denmark	166	Damaged
