= SM U-89 =

Submarine serving in the Imperial German Navy in World War I

History

German Empire
- Name: U-89
- Ordered: 23 June 1915
- Builder: Kaiserliche Werft Danzig
- Yard number: 33
- Laid down: 15 December 1915
- Launched: 6 October 1916
- Commissioned: 21 June 1917
- Fate: Rammed and sunk 12 February 1918

General characteristics
- Class & type: Type U 87 submarine
- Displacement: 757 t (745 long tons) surfaced; 998 t (982 long tons) submerged
- Length: 65.80 m (215 ft 11 in) (o/a); 50.07 m (164 ft 3 in) (pressure hull)
- Beam: 6.20 m (20 ft 4 in) (oa); 4.18 m (13 ft 9 in) (pressure hull)
- Height: 9.35 m (30 ft 8 in)
- Draught: 3.88 m (12 ft 9 in)
- Installed power: 2 × 2,400 PS (1,765 kW; 2,367 shp) surfaced; 2 × 1,200 PS (883 kW; 1,184 shp) submerged
- Propulsion: 2 shafts, 2 × 1.66 m (5 ft 5 in) propellers
- Speed: 16.8 knots (31.1 km/h; 19.3 mph) surfaced; 9.1 knots (16.9 km/h; 10.5 mph) submerged
- Range: 11,380 nmi (21,080 km; 13,100 mi) at 8 knots (15 km/h; 9.2 mph) surfaced; 56 nmi (104 km; 64 mi) at 5 knots (9.3 km/h; 5.8 mph) submerged
- Test depth: 50 m (160 ft)
- Complement: 4 officers, 32 enlisted
- Armament: 4 × 50 cm (19.7 in) torpedo tubes (two bow, two stern); 10-12 torpedoes; 1 × 10.5 cm (4.1 in) SK L/45 deck gun; 1 × 8.8 cm (3.5 in) SK L/30 deck gun

Service record
- Part of: III Flotilla; 6 September 1917 – 12 February 1918
- Commanders: Kptlt. August Mildenberger; 21 June 1917 – 15 January 1918; Kptlt. Wilhelm Bauck; 16 January – 12 February 1918
- Operations: 3 patrols
- Victories: 4 merchant ships sunk (8,496 GRT); 1 merchant ship damaged (324 GRT)

SM U-89 (Note: "SM" stands for "Seiner Majestät" (English: His Majesty's) and combined with the U for Unterseeboot would be translated as His Majesty's Submarine.) was one of the 329 submarines serving in the Imperial German Navy in World War I. U-89 was engaged in the naval warfare and took part in the First Battle of the Atlantic. On 12 February 1918, U-89 was rammed and sunk by HMS Roxburgh off Malin Head. There were no survivors.

== Design ==
Type U 87 submarines were preceded by the shorter Type U 81 submarines. U-89 had a displacement of 757 tonnes (745 long tons) when at the surface and 998 tonnes (982 long tons) while submerged. She had a total length of 65.80 m (215 ft 11 in), a pressure hull length of 50.07 m (164 ft 3 in), a beam of 6.20 m (20 ft 4 in), a height of 9.35 m (30 ft 8 in), and a draught of 3.88 m (12 ft 9 in). The submarine was powered by two 2,400 metric horsepower (1,800 kW; 2,400 shp) engines for use while surfaced, and two 1,200 metric horsepower (880 kW; 1,200 shp) engines for use while submerged. She had two propeller shafts. She was capable of operating at depths of up to 50 metres (160 ft).

The submarine had a maximum surface speed of 15.6 knots (28.9 km/h; 18.0 mph) and a maximum submerged speed of 8.6 knots (15.9 km/h; 9.9 mph). When submerged, she could operate for 56 nautical miles (104 km; 64 mi) at 5 knots (9.3 km/h; 5.8 mph); when surfaced, she could travel 11,380 nautical miles (21,080 km; 13,100 mi) at 8 knots (15 km/h; 9.2 mph). U-89 was fitted with four 50 centimetres (20 in) torpedo tubes (two at the bow and two at the stern), ten to twelve torpedoes, one 10.5 cm (4.1 in) SK L/45 deck gun, and one 8.8 cm (3.5 in) SK L/30 deck gun. She had a complement of thirty-six (thirty-two crew members and four officers).

== Summary of raiding history ==
Date	Name	Nationality	Tonnage (Note: Tonnages are in gross register tons)	Fate
2 October 1917	Trafaria	Portugal	1,744	Sunk
3 October 1917	Baron Blantyre	United Kingdom	1,844	Sunk
6 October 1917	Victorine	France	1,241	Sunk
12 December 1917	Reine D'arvor	France	324	Damaged
21 December 1917	Boa Vista	Portugal	3,667	Sunk

== Bibliography ==
- Gröner, Erich; Jung, Dieter; Maass, Martin (1991). U-boats and Mine Warfare Vessels. German Warships 1815–1945. Vol. 2. Translated by Thomas, Keith; Magowan, Rachel. London: Conway Maritime Press. ISBN 0-85177-593-4.
