= SM UC-60 =

German Type UC II minelaying U-boat

History

German Empire
- Name: UC-60
- Ordered: 12 January 1916
- Builder: Kaiserliche Werft, Danzig
- Yard number: 42
- Laid down: 31 March 1916
- Launched: 8 November 1916
- Commissioned: 25 June 1917
- Fate: Surrendered, 23 February 1919; broken up, 1921

General characteristics
- Class & type: Type UC II submarine
- Displacement: 415 t (408 long tons), surfaced; 498 t (490 long tons), submerged
- Length: 52.69 m (172 ft 10 in) o/a; 40.96 m (134 ft 5 in) pressure hull
- Beam: 5.22 m (17 ft 2 in) o/a; 3.65 m (12 ft) pressure hull
- Draught: 3.61 m (11 ft 10 in)
- Propulsion: 2 × propeller shafts; 2 × 6-cylinder, 4-stroke diesel engines, 580–600 PS (430–440 kW; 570–590 shp); 2 × electric motors, 620 PS (460 kW; 610 shp)
- Speed: 11.6 knots (21.5 km/h; 13.3 mph), surfaced; 7.3 knots (13.5 km/h; 8.4 mph), submerged
- Range: 8,660–9,450 nmi (16,040–17,500 km; 9,970–10,870 mi) at 7 knots (13 km/h; 8.1 mph) surfaced; 52 nmi (96 km; 60 mi) at 4 knots (7.4 km/h; 4.6 mph) submerged
- Test depth: 50 m (160 ft)
- Complement: 26
- Armament: 6 × 100 cm (39.4 in) mine tubes; 18 × UC 200 mines; 3 × 50 cm (19.7 in) torpedo tubes (2 bow/external; one stern); 7 × torpedoes; 1 × 8.8 cm (3.5 in) Uk L/30 deck gun
- Notes: 30-second diving time

Service record
- Part of: Baltic Flotilla; 1 September – 26 November 1917; Training Flotilla; 26 November 1917 – 11 November 1918
- Commanders: Oblt.z.S. Waldemar von Fischer; 25 June – 30 November 1917
- Operations: 1 patrol
- Victories: 1 merchant ship sunk (1,426 GRT)

SM UC-60 was a German Type UC II minelaying submarine or U-boat in the German Imperial Navy (German: Kaiserliche Marine) during World War I. The U-boat was ordered on 12 January 1916, laid down on 31 March 1916, and was launched on 8 November 1916. She was commissioned into the German Imperial Navy on 25 June 1917 as SM UC-60. (Note: "SM" stands for "Seiner Majestät" (English: His Majesty's) and combined with the U for Unterseeboot would be translated as His Majesty's Submarine.) In one patrols UC-60 was credited with sinking one ship, either by torpedo or by mines laid. UC-60 was surrendered on 23 February 1919 and was broken up at Rainham in 1921.

== Design ==
A Type UC II submarine, UC-60 had a displacement of 415 tonnes (408 long tons) when at the surface and 498 tonnes (490 long tons) while submerged. She had a length overall of 50.52 m (165 ft 9 in), a beam of 5.22 m (17 ft 2 in), and a draught of 3.61 m (11 ft 10 in). The submarine was powered by two six-cylinder four-stroke diesel engines each producing 290–300 metric horsepower (210–220 kW; 290–300 shp) (a total of 580–600 metric horsepower (430–440 kW; 570–590 shp)), two electric motors producing 620 metric horsepower (460 kW; 610 shp), and two propeller shafts. She had a dive time of 48 seconds and was capable of operating at a depth of 50 metres (160 ft).

The submarine had a maximum surface speed of 11.6 knots (21.5 km/h; 13.3 mph) and a submerged speed of 7.3 knots (13.5 km/h; 8.4 mph). When submerged, she could operate for 52 nautical miles (96 km; 60 mi) at 4 knots (7.4 km/h; 4.6 mph); when surfaced, she could travel 8,660 to 9,450 nautical miles (16,040 to 17,500 km; 9,970 to 10,870 mi) at 7 knots (13 km/h; 8.1 mph). UC-60 was fitted with six 100 centimetres (39 in) mine tubes, eighteen UC 200 mines, three 50 centimetres (20 in) torpedo tubes (one on the stern and two on the bow), seven torpedoes, and one 8.8 cm (3.5 in) Uk L/30 deck gun. Her complement was twenty-six crew members.

== Summary of raiding history ==
Date	Name	Nationality	Tonnage (Note: Merchant ship tonnages are in gross register tons. Military vessels are listed by tons displacement.)	Fate
16 October 1917	Est	Imperial Russian Navy	1,426	Sunk
