= SM UB-48 =

German submarine

- UB-148 at sea, a U-boat similar to UB-48.

History

German Empire
- Name: UB-48
- Ordered: 20 May 1916
- Builder: Blohm & Voss, Hamburg
- Cost: 3,276,000 German Papiermark
- Yard number: 293
- Launched: 6 January 1917
- Commissioned: 11 June 1917
- Fate: Scuttled at Pola on 28 October 1918 following the surrender of Austria-Hungary.

General characteristics
- Class & type: Type UB III submarine
- Displacement: 516 t (508 long tons) surfaced; 651 t (641 long tons) submerged
- Length: 55.30 m (181 ft 5 in) (o/a)
- Beam: 5.80 m (19 ft)
- Draught: 3.68 m (12 ft 1 in)
- Propulsion: 2 × propeller shaft; 2 × MAN four-stroke 6-cylinder diesel engine, 1,085 bhp (809 kW); 2 × Siemens-Schuckert electric motor, 780 shp (580 kW)
- Speed: 13.6 knots (25.2 km/h; 15.7 mph) surfaced; 8 knots (15 km/h; 9.2 mph) submerged
- Range: 9,040 nmi (16,740 km; 10,400 mi) at 6 knots (11 km/h; 6.9 mph) surfaced; 55 nmi (102 km; 63 mi) at 4 knots (7.4 km/h; 4.6 mph) submerged
- Test depth: 50 m (160 ft)
- Complement: 3 officers, 31 men
- Armament: 5 × 50 cm (19.7 in) torpedo tubes (4 bow, 1 stern); 10 torpedoes; 1 × 8.8 cm (3.46 in) deck gun

Service record
- Part of: Mittelmeer / Mittelmeer II Flotilla; 2 September 1917 – 28 October 1918
- Commanders: Oblt.z.S. / Kptlt. Wolfgang Steinbauer; 11 June 1917 – 28 October 1918
- Operations: 9 patrols
- Victories: 33 merchant ships sunk (106,848 GRT); 2 auxiliary warships sunk (947 GRT); 6 merchant ships damaged (24,618 GRT); 1 warship damaged (18,400 tons); 2 auxiliary warships damaged (495 GRT)

SM UB-48 was a German Type UB III submarine or U-boat in the German Imperial Navy (German: Kaiserliche Marine) during World War I. It was commissioned into the German Imperial Navy on 11 June 1917 as SM UB-48. (Note: "SM" stands for "Seiner Majestät" (English: His Majesty's) and combined with the U for Unterseeboot would be translated as His Majesty's Submarine.)

The submarine conducted nine patrols and sank 35 ships during the war for a total loss of 107,795 gross register tons (GRT) and one destroyer. It operated as part of the Pola Flotilla and later the II Mediterranean U-boat Flotilla based in Cattaro. UB-48 was one of the most successful U-boats serving in the Mediterranean. The boat was assigned the number U-79 in the Austro-Hungarian Navy. It was scuttled in Pola after the surrender of Austria-Hungary on 28 October 1918.

== Construction ==
UB-48 was ordered by the GIN on 20 May 1916 and built by Blohm & Voss of Hamburg. Following less than a year of construction, it was launched at Hamburg on 6 January 1917. UB-48 was commissioned later that same year under the command of Wolfgang Steinbauer. Like all Type UB III submarines, UB-48 carried ten torpedoes and was armed with a 8.8 cm (3.46 in) deck gun. UB-48 would carry a crew of up to 3 officer and 31 men and had a cruising range of 9,090 nautical miles (16,830 km; 10,460 mi). UB-48 had a displacement of 516 t (508 long tons) while surfaced and 651 t (641 long tons) when submerged. Her engines enabled her to travel at 13.6 knots (25.2 km/h; 15.7 mph) when surfaced and 8 knots (15 km/h; 9.2 mph) when submerged.

== Summary of raiding history ==
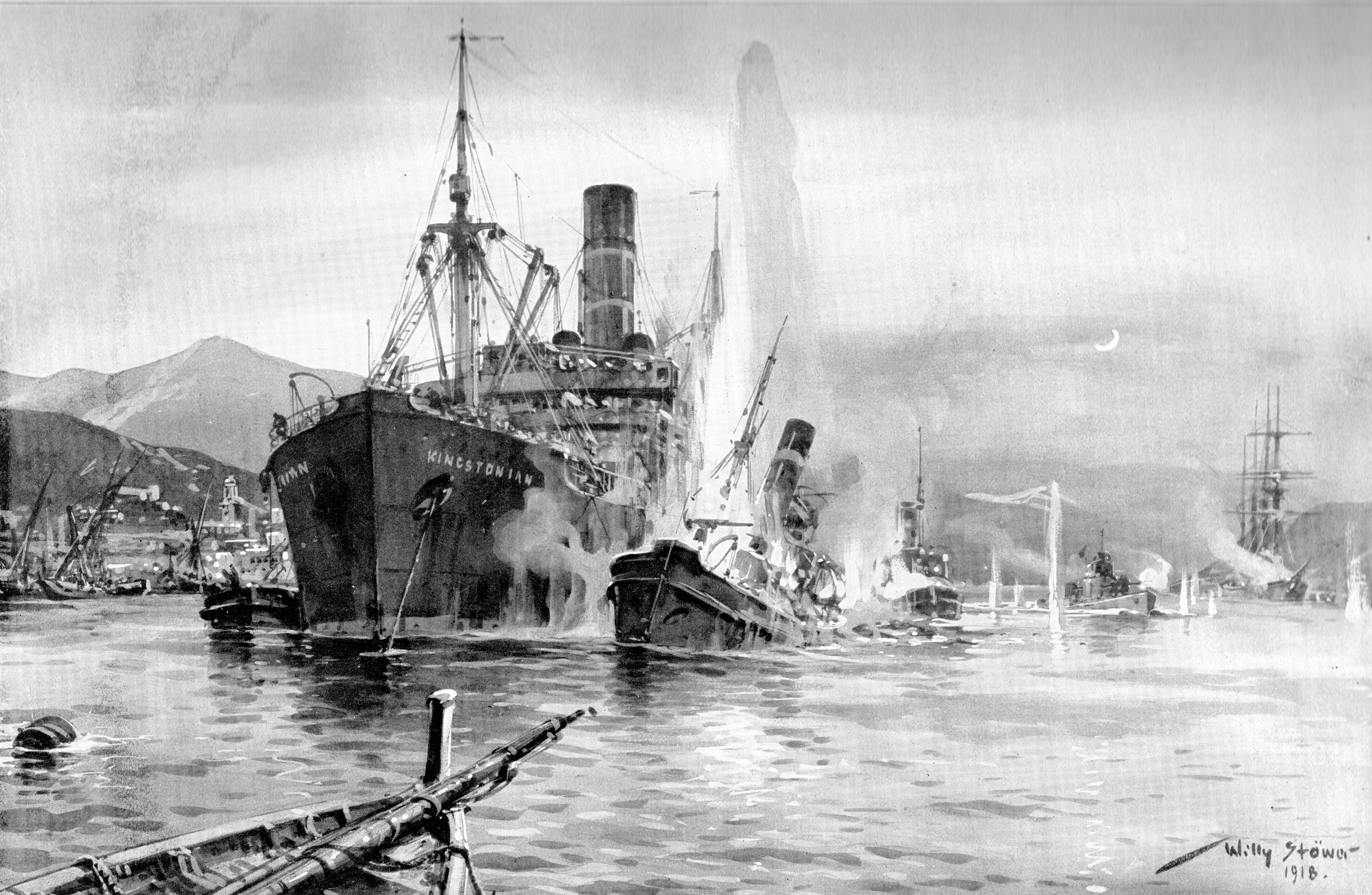
SM UB 48 under Captain Lieutenant Wolfgang Steinbauer invaded the Italian port of Carloforte on 29 April 1918 and destroyed the British steamer Kingstonian, two British salvage steamers and a French barque

Ships sunk or damaged by SM UB-48
Date	Name	Nationality	Tonnage (Note: Merchant ship tonnages are in gross register tons. Military vessels are listed by tons displacement.)	Fate
12 August 1917	Roanoke	United Kingdom	4,803	Sunk
14 August 1917	HMS Prize	Royal Navy	199	Sunk
18 August 1917	Kongsli	Norway	5,826	Sunk
20 August 1917	Serra Do Marco	Portugal	74	Sunk
20 August 1917	Serra Do Pilar	Portugal	65	Sunk
23 August 1917	Winlaton	United Kingdom	3,270	Sunk
27 August 1917	Hathor	United Kingdom	3,823	Sunk
2 October 1917	Imera	Italy	1,172	Sunk
6 October 1917	Citta Di Bari	Italy	1,489	Sunk
9 October 1917	Niki	Greece	511	Sunk
14 October 1917	Valparaiso	Italy	4,930	Sunk
19 October 1917	Pera	United Kingdom	7,635	Sunk
20 October 1917	Collegian	United Kingdom	7,520	Sunk
27 November 1917	Glenbridge	United Kingdom	3,845	Damaged
4 December 1917	Dowlais	United Kingdom	3,016	Sunk
4 December 1917	Gerasimos	Greece	3,845	Sunk
8 December 1917	Consols	United Kingdom	3,756	Sunk
27 January 1918	Volonta Di Dio	Italy	43	Sunk
30 January 1918	Harlaw	Italy	821	Sunk
2 February 1918	Celia	United Kingdom	5,004	Sunk
2 February 1918	Edilio	Italy	4,719	Sunk
2 February 1918	Newminster Abbey	United Kingdom	3,114	Sunk
3 February 1918	Aboukir	United Kingdom	3,660	Sunk
7 February 1918	Sturton	United Kingdom	4,406	Sunk
26 April 1918	Upada	United Kingdom	5,257	Damaged
26 April 1918	Leopold D’or	France	2,300	Sunk
27 April 1918	Romany	United Kingdom	3,983	Sunk
27 April 1918	Saint Jean	French Navy	287	Damaged
29 April 1918	Kingstonian	United Kingdom	6,564	Sunk
29 April 1918	HMT Dalkeith	Royal Navy	748	Sunk
29 April 1918	Monte Bianco	France	988	Damaged
29 April 1918	HMT Moose	Royal Navy	208	Damaged
2 May 1918	Franklyn	United Kingdom	4,919	Sunk
2 May 1918	Tyler	United States	3,928	Sunk
5 May 1918	Clan Ross	United Kingdom	5,971	Damaged
2 June 1918	San Antonio	Italy	389	Sunk
6 June 1918	Christophero Colombo	Italy	264	Sunk
10 June 1918	Nivernais	France	2,555	Sunk
13 June 1918	Penhallow	United Kingdom	4,318	Sunk
16 August 1918	Balkan	France	1,709	Sunk
18 August 1918	Nordboen	Denmark	2,417	Sunk
1 September 1918	Baron Minto	United Kingdom	4,537	Damaged
1 September 1918	Monviso	Italy	4,020	Damaged
18 October 1918	Voltaire	French Navy	18,400	Damaged

== Bibliography ==
- Bendert, Harald (2000). Die UB-Boote der Kaiserlichen Marine, 1914-1918. Einsätze, Erfolge, Schicksal (in German). Hamburg: Verlag E.S. Mittler & Sohn GmbH. ISBN 3-8132-0713-7.
- Gröner, Erich; Jung, Dieter; Maass, Martin (1991). German Warships 1815–1945, U-boats and Mine Warfare Vessels. Vol. 2. Translated by Thomas, Keith; Magowan, Rachel. London: Conway Maritime Press. ISBN 0-85177-593-4.
- Rössler, Eberhard (1979). Die deutschen U-Boote und ihre Werften: eine Bilddokumentation über den deutschen U-Bootbau; in zwei Bänden (in German). Vol. I. Munich: Bernard & Graefe. ISBN 3-7637-5213-7.
