= SM U-96 =

Type U 93 submarine

History

German Empire
- Name: U-96
- Ordered: 15 September 1915
- Builder: Germaniawerft, Kiel
- Yard number: 260
- Laid down: 12 January 1916
- Launched: 15 February 1917
- Commissioned: 11 April 1917
- Fate: Surrendered 20 November 1918

General characteristics
- Class & type: Type U 93 submarine
- Displacement: 837 t (824 long tons) surfaced; 998 t (982 long tons) submerged
- Length: 71.55 m (234 ft 9 in) (o/a); 56.05 m (183 ft 11 in) (pressure hull)
- Beam: 6.30 m (20 ft 8 in) (o/a); 4.15 m (13 ft 7 in) (pressure hull)
- Height: 8.25 m (27 ft 1 in)
- Draught: 3.94 m (12 ft 11 in)
- Installed power: 2 × 2,300 PS (1,692 kW; 2,269 shp) surfaced; 2 × 1,200 PS (883 kW; 1,184 shp) submerged
- Propulsion: 2 shafts, 2 × 1.66 m (5 ft 5 in) propellers
- Speed: 16.9 knots (31.3 km/h; 19.4 mph) surfaced; 8.6 knots (15.9 km/h; 9.9 mph) submerged
- Range: 8,290 nmi (15,350 km; 9,540 mi) at 8 knots (15 km/h; 9.2 mph) surfaced; 47 nmi (87 km; 54 mi) at 5 knots (9.3 km/h; 5.8 mph) submerged
- Test depth: 50 m (160 ft)
- Complement: 4 officers, 32 enlisted
- Armament: 6 × 50 cm (19.7 in) torpedo tubes (four bow, two stern); 12–16 torpedoes; 1 × 1 10.5 cm (4.1 in) SK L/45 deck gun

Service record
- Part of: IV Flotilla; 24 May 1917 – 11 November 1918
- Commanders: Kptlt. Heinrich Jeß; 11 April 1917 – 31 August 1918
- Operations: 9 patrols
- Victories: 30 merchant ships sunk (89,893 GRT); 1 auxiliary warship sunk (5,360 GRT); 3 merchant ships damaged (16,220 GRT)

SM U-96 was a Type U 93 submarine and one of the 329 submarines serving in the Imperial German Navy in World War I. U-96 was engaged in the naval warfare and took part in the First Battle of the Atlantic. She was launched in 1917. On 6 December 1917, she collided with the submarine SM UC-69 at Barfleur, France (49°47′N 1°10′W); UC-69 sank with the loss of eleven of her crew. U-96 survived the war.

== Design ==
Type U 93 submarines were preceded by the shorter Type U 87 submarines. U-96 had a displacement of 838 tonnes (825 long tons) when at the surface and 1,000 tonnes (980 long tons) while submerged. She had a total length of 71.55 m (234 ft 9 in), a pressure hull length of 56.05 m (183 ft 11 in), a beam of 6.30 m (20 ft 8 in), a height of 8.25 m (27 ft 1 in), and a draught of 3.94 m (12 ft 11 in). The submarine was powered by two 2,300 metric horsepower (1,700 kW; 2,300 shp) engines for use while surfaced, and two 1,200 metric horsepower (880 kW; 1,200 shp) engines for use while submerged. She had two propeller shafts. She was capable of operating at depths of up to 50 metres (160 ft).

The submarine had a maximum surface speed of 16.8 knots (31.1 km/h; 19.3 mph) and a maximum submerged speed of 8.6 knots (15.9 km/h; 9.9 mph). When submerged, she could operate for 47 nautical miles (87 km; 54 mi) at 5 knots (9.3 km/h; 5.8 mph); when surfaced, she could travel 8,290 nautical miles (15,350 km; 9,540 mi) at 8 knots (15 km/h; 9.2 mph). U-96 was fitted with six 50 centimetres (20 in) torpedo tubes (four at the bow and two at the stern), twelve to sixteen torpedoes, and one 10.5 cm (4.1 in) SK L/45 deck gun. She had a complement of thirty-six (thirty-two crew members and four officers).

== Summary of raiding history ==
Date	Name	Nationality	Tonnage (Note: Merchant ship tonnages are in gross register tons. Military vessels are listed by tons displacement.)	Fate
2 June 1917	Shamrock	United Kingdom	170	Sunk
2 June 1917	St. Bernard	United Kingdom	186	Sunk
8 June 1917	Orator	United Kingdom	3,563	Sunk
9 June 1917	Baron Cawdor	United Kingdom	4,316	Sunk
14 July 1917	Emanuel	Denmark	203	Sunk
21 July 1917	Paddington	United Kingdom	5,084	Sunk
23 July 1917	Radioleine	France	4,029	Damaged
29 July 1917	Anitra	Norway	593	Sunk
1 October 1917	Carrabin	United Kingdom	2,739	Sunk
3 October 1917	Hurst	United Kingdom	4,718	Sunk
4 October 1917	Rupee	United Kingdom	39	Sunk
4 October 1917	Young Clifford	United Kingdom	47	Sunk
6 October 1917	Bedale	United Kingdom	2,116	Sunk
8 October 1917	Greldon	United Kingdom	3,322	Sunk
8 October 1917	Memphian	United Kingdom	6,305	Sunk
9 October 1917	HMS Champagne	Royal Navy	5,360	Sunk
9 October 1917	Peshawur	United Kingdom	7,634	Sunk
23 November 1917	La Blanca	United Kingdom	7,479	Sunk
24 November 1917	Sabia	United Kingdom	2,807	Sunk
26 November 1917	Drot	Norway	2,923	Sunk
28 November 1917	Agenoria	United Kingdom	2,977	Damaged
28 November 1917	Apapa	United Kingdom	7,832	Sunk
30 November 1917	Derbent	United Kingdom	3,178	Sunk
20 March 1918	Custodian	United Kingdom	9,214	Damaged
25 March 1918	Destro	United Kingdom	859	Sunk
28 March 1918	Inkosi	United Kingdom	3,661	Sunk
30 March 1918	Geraldine	United Kingdom	61	Sunk
30 March 1918	St. Michan	United Kingdom	43	Sunk
31 March 1918	Conargo	United Kingdom	4,312	Sunk
27 May 1918	Michiel Taal Johsz	Netherlands	86	Sunk
5 June 1918	Polwell	United Kingdom	2,013	Sunk
9 June 1918	Vandalia	United Kingdom	7,333	Sunk
4 August 1918	Reinhard	Russian Empire	239	Sunk
7 August 1918	Highland Harris	United Kingdom	6,032	Sunk

== Original documents from Room 40 ==
The following is a verbatim transcription of the recorded activities of SM U-96 known to British Naval Intelligence, Room 40 O.B.:

"SM U-96. Kaptlt Jess, from U-79, in September 1918 to U-90. Came off the stocks at Kiel early in 1917, joined the Kiel School and remained there until about the end of May, when she left for the North Sea, being attached to the 4th Flotilla.

- 29 May – 21 June 1917. To S.W. of Ireland, northabout both ways, with U-95 on the way North as far as Shetlands. Claimed 8,000 tons.
- 10–30 July 1917. To S.W. of Ireland northabout both ways. Claimed 7,600 tons. Reported periscope damaged by a collision.
- 24 September – 16 October 1917. Went through Channel and operated in western approaches and Irish Sea. Returned northabout and by Sound. Sank 9 vessels of which Lloyds Registered Tonnage was 34,881 tons. Submarine claimed 37,000 tons.
- 21 November – 9 December 1917. To Irish Sea by Channel both ways. Claimed 35,000 tons. While returning from this cruise U-96 rammed UC-69 off Barfleur, an officer and 10 men of UC-69 being drowned.
- 14–20 February 1918. Went north but returned with defects.
- 14 March – 8 April 1918. To Irish Sea. Northabout both ways. Back via Sound. Claimed 19,000 tons. Seems to have been used in attempt to cut off transports from England to north of France.
- 25 May – 22 June 1918. To Irish Sea and south of Ireland via Bight and northabout. Back northabout and Sound. Sank 2 S.S. and fired on fishing fleet. Attacked 2 U.S. destroyers unsuccessfully, also 4 S.S. Was depth-charged on 4 June in Irish Sea, and returned with various defects. (Possibly depth-charged by HMS Viola on 18 June in 61°49′N 0°20′W.)
- 30 July – 23 August 1918. Went northabout, found North Channel unsafe and proceeded to St. George’s Channel. Sank 1 S.S. only, and returned with starboard engine out of order, and bearings of port engine damaged.
- 20 November 1918. Surrendered at Harwich."

Note: S.S. = Steam Ship; S.V. = Sailing Vessel; northabout, Muckle Flugga, Fair I. = around Scotland; Sound, Belts, Kattegat = via North of Denmark to/from German Baltic ports; Bight = to/from German North Sea ports; success = sinking of ships

— Koerver, Hans Joachim (2009). Room 40: German Naval Warfare 1914-1918. Vol II., The Fleet in Being. Steinbach: LIS Reinisch. ISBN 978-3-902433-77-0.

== See also ==
- Room 40

== Bibliography ==
- Gröner, Erich; Jung, Dieter; Maass, Martin (1991). U-boats and Mine Warfare Vessels. German Warships 1815–1945. Vol. 2. Translated by Thomas, Keith; Magowan, Rachel. London: Conway Maritime Press. ISBN 0-85177-593-4.
- Spindler, Arno (1966) [1932]. Der Handelskrieg mit U-Booten. 5 Vols. Berlin: Mittler & Sohn. Vols. 4+5, dealing with 1917+18, are very hard to find: Guildhall Library, London, has them all, also Vol. 1-3 in an English translation: The submarine war against commerce.
- Beesly, Patrick (1982). Room 40: British Naval Intelligence 1914-1918. London: H Hamilton. ISBN 978-0-241-10864-2.
- Halpern, Paul G. (1995). A Naval History of World War I. New York: Routledge. ISBN 978-1-85728-498-0.
- Roessler, Eberhard (1997). Die Unterseeboote der Kaiserlichen Marine. Bonn: Bernard & Graefe. ISBN 978-3-7637-5963-7.
- Schroeder, Joachim (2002). Die U-Boote des Kaisers. Bonn: Bernard & Graefe. ISBN 978-3-7637-6235-4.
- Koerver, Hans Joachim (2008). Room 40: German Naval Warfare 1914-1918. Vol I., The Fleet in Action. Steinbach: LIS Reinisch. ISBN 978-3-902433-76-3.
- Koerver, Hans Joachim (2009). Room 40: German Naval Warfare 1914-1918. Vol II., The Fleet in Being. Steinbach: LIS Reinisch. ISBN 978-3-902433-77-0.
