= Type UC II submarine =

1916 class of German coastal submarines

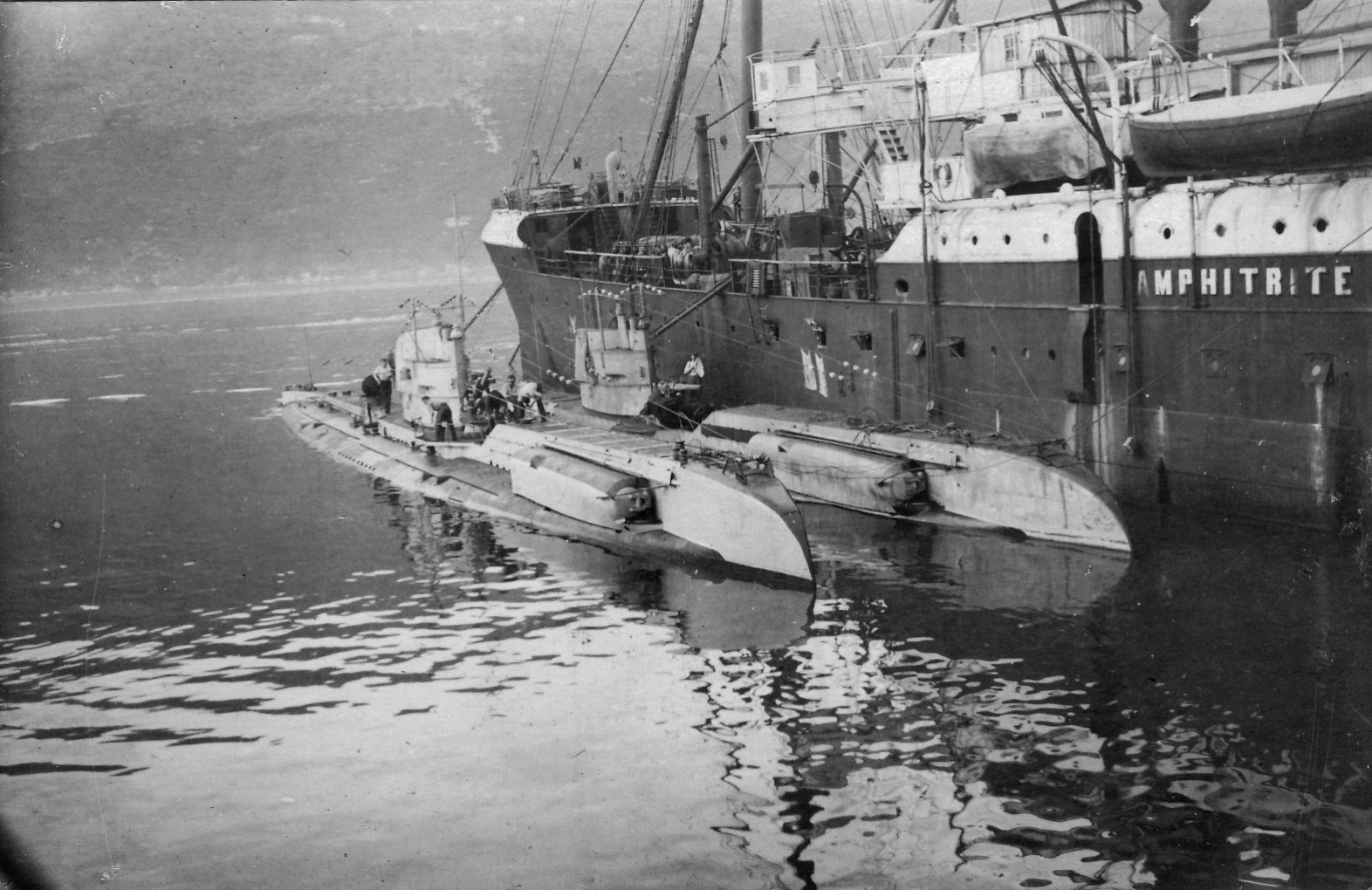
- Two Type UC II submarines alongside Austro-Hungarian depot ship Amphitrite at Gjenovic, Bocche di Cattaro, in the Adriatic Sea

Class overview
- Builders: AG Weser, Bremen; Blohm & Voss, Hamburg; Vulcan, Hamburg; Germaniawerft, Kiel; Kaiserliche Werft Danzig
- Operators: Imperial German Navy
- Preceded by: UC I
- Succeeded by: UC III
- Cost: 1,729,000–2,141,000 German Mark
- Built: 1916–1917
- In commission: 1916–1918
- Planned: 64
- Building: 64
- Completed: 64
- Lost: 46

General characteristics
- Type: Coastal minelaying submarine
- Displacement: 400–434 t (394–427 long tons) surfaced; 480–511 t (472–503 long tons) submerged
- Length: 49.35–53.15 m (161 ft 11 in – 174 ft 5 in) o/a
- Beam: 5.22 m (17 ft 2 in)
- Draught: 3.65 m (12 ft)
- Propulsion: 2 shafts; 2 6-cylinder diesel engines, 500–660 PS (370–490 kW; 490–650 shp); 2 electric motors, 340–460 kW (460–630 PS)
- Speed: 11.6–12 knots (21.5–22.2 km/h; 13.3–13.8 mph) surfaced; 6.7–7.4 knots (12.4–13.7 km/h; 7.7–8.5 mph) submerged
- Range: 7,280–10,040 mi (11,720–16,160 km) at 7 knots (13 km/h; 8.1 mph) surfaced; 52–60 mi (84–97 km) at 4 knots (7.4 km/h; 4.6 mph) submerged
- Complement: 3 officers, 23 enlisted
- Armament: 3 × 50 cm (19.7 in) torpedo tubes ( 2 external bow and 1 internal stern ) with 7 torpedoes; 1 × 8.8 cm (3.5 in) SK L/30 or 10.5 cm (4.1 in) SK L/45 deck gun; 18 × Type UC 200 mines in 6 chutes

The Type UC II submarine was a class of coastal minelaying U-boats designed and built for the Imperial German Navy during World War I. They were a significant improvement over the preceding Type UC I in armament, range and seaking abilities. Construction began in 1915 and by mid-1917 64 Type UC II had been delivered by five shipyards in ten different batches, which had variations in dimensions and performance. By the end of the war, 46 Type UC II were lost. The Type UC II was a very successful design combining torpedo, deck gun and mine armament with a sufficient performance and range to operate around Great Britain. A succeeding Type UC III was ordered and built in large numbers but came too late to see service in World War I.

== Design ==
In the summer of 1916 some restrictions were imposed on the unrestricted submarine warfare campaign, and minelaying became more significant. The Type UC I minelayer had proven its value and that U-boat design had fulfilled the expectations, but it had its limitations: The Type UC I was underpowered and had problems operating in the strong currents of the English Channel, it had only one diesel engine so when that engine broke down the boat was helpless and the lack of a deck gun and torpedo tube made it impossible to attack any enemy ship encountered whilst on minelaying mission.

In order to tackle these problems and to fulfill the extra requirement of being able to sail independently to the Mediterranean Sea instead of being disassembled and transported by rail, a much larger Type UC II was designed. The Type UC II was equipped with the same UC/200 mines as the Type UC I, and mounted the same number of inclined mine shafts going through the pressure hull. Because of the larger hull, and by raising the forward deck, these mine shafts were longer and could store three instead of two mines. In order to give the Type UC II an offensive armament, a torpedo compartment with one torpedo tube was installed on the stern after the engine compartment. As the mine shafts occupied the complete bow compartment, two bow torpedo tubes were mounted externally besides the raised mineshaft deck. A deck gun was installed between the raised foredeck and the conning tower.

Although the combination of mines, torpedo and deck gun, the extended range and increased surface speed, made this Type UC II one of the most efficient U-boat designs, there were some drawbacks: the raised forecastle made the boat more difficult to handle, especially when wind was above Force 5. This raised bow made diving also more difficult and slow, although the thirty-five to forty second diving time were considered given the circumstances. A third drawback of the raised bow was that the deck gun was awash in rough seas, and spray made watchkeeping on the conning tower difficult even in moderate weather. These problems were addressed in the subsequent Type UC III, but this type did not become operational before the end of the war.

== Construction ==
On 21 August 1915 the first two batches of Type UC II were ordered: Blohm & Voss in Hamburg received an order for nine Type UC II UC-16 - UC-24 and AG Vulcan in Hamburg received an order for a further nine U-boats UC-25 - UC-33, with expected delivery date between March and June 1916. After the cessation of the first unrestricted submarine warfare campaign on 19 September 1915, the way of enforcing the blockade of Great Britain shifted even more towards minelaying, and on 9 November 1915 the German Navy decided to build as many Type UC II as could be built by September 1916. Six more Type UC II UC-34 - UC-39 were ordered from Blohm & Voss, a further six UC-40 - UC-45 from AG Vulcan and AG Weser in Hamburg received an order for three U-boats UC-46 - UC-48. In January 1916, the head of the German Navy Alfred von Tirpitz ordered the construction work on ships which would not be finished before October 1916, be delayed in order to free up capacity for further Type UC II construction. Five more batches were ordered on 11 January 1916: UC-49 - UC-54 from Germaniawerft, UC-55 - UC-60 from Kaiserliche Werft Danzig, UC-61 - UC-64 from AG Weser, UC-65 - UC-73 from Blohm & Voss and UC-74 - UC-79 from Vulcan.

== Characteristics ==
=== Dimensions ===
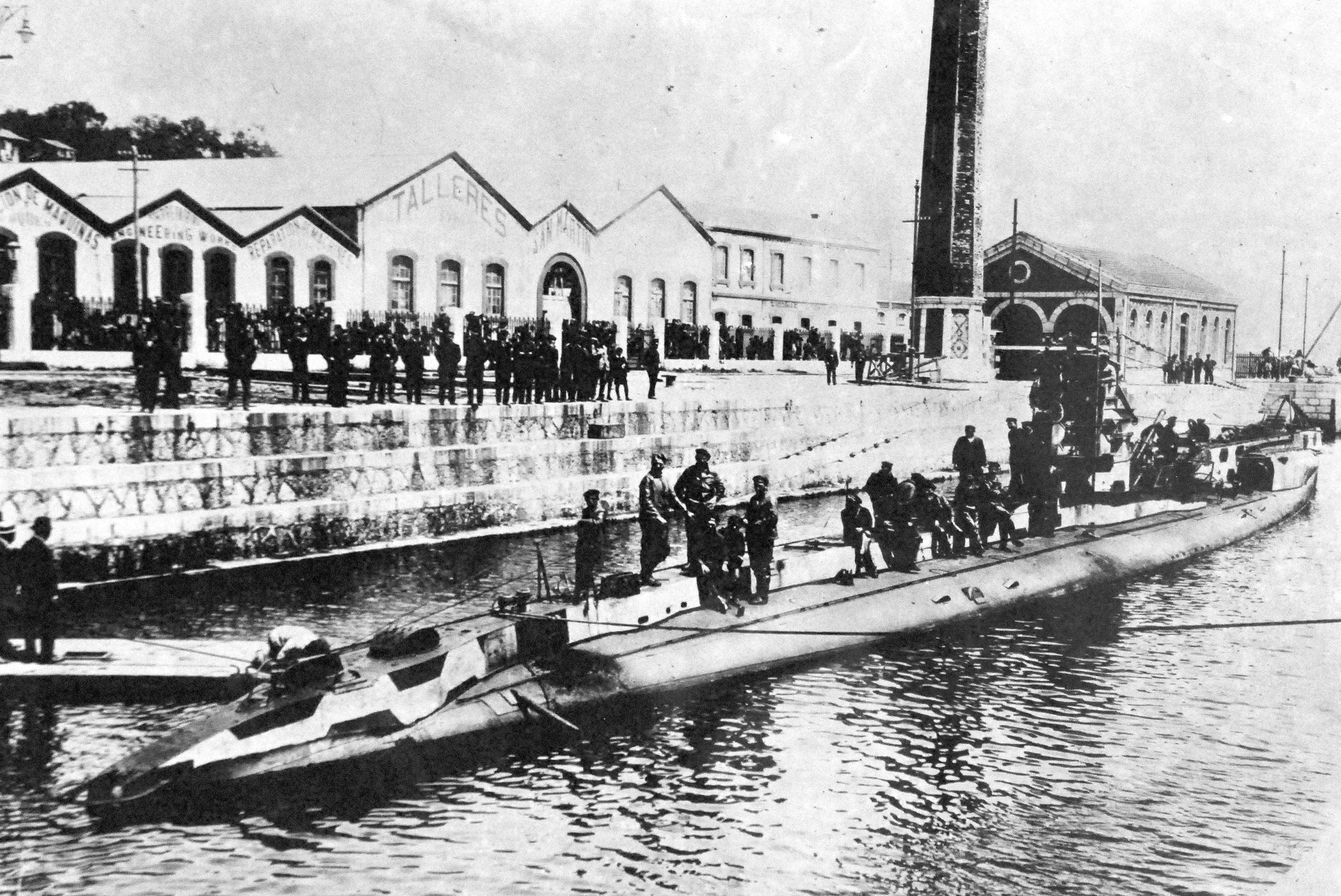
The UC-56 was interned in Spain in March 1918

All ten Type UC II batches had small variations in overall length, length of the pressure hull, draft and displacement. All Type UC II had a beam of 5.22 (17.1), a complement of three officers and twenty-three enlisted men. One reason for the variations in overall length was the different form of the bow, which in early versions was rounded, whilst later versions had a sharp nose, with many boats receiving the modification from rounded to pointed bow after construction. Constructional diving depth (Note: Constructional diving depth had a safety factor of 2.5, which meant that crushing depth was 2.5 times construction diving depth.) was 50 meters (164 feet).

variations in dimensions of the Type UC II
| batch | length overall m (ft) | length pressure hull m (ft) | draft m (ft) | displacement surfaced tonnes (long tons) | displacement submerged tonnes (long tons) |
|---|---|---|---|---|---|
| UC-16 - UC-24 | 52.15 (171.1) | 39.30 (128.9) | 3.68 (12.1) | 417 (410) | 493 (485) |
| UC-25 - UC-33 | 51.12 (167.7) | 39.30 (128.9) | 3.68 (12.1) | 400 (390) | 480 (470) |
| UC-34 - UC-39 | 53.15 (174.4) | 40.30 (132.2) | 3.65 (12.0) | 427 (420) | 509 (501) |
| UC-40 - UC-45 | 51.11 (167.7) | 40.30 (132.2) | 3.68 (12.1) | 400 (390) | 480 (470) |
| UC-46 - UC-48 | 51.85 (170.1) | 39.70 (130.2) | 3.67 (12.0) | 420 (410) | 502 (494) |
| UC-49 - UC-54 | 52.69 (172.9) | 40.96 (134.4) | 3.64 (11.9) | 434 (427) | 511 (503) |
| UC-55 - UC-60 | 52.67 (172.8) | 40.86 (134.1) | 3.61 (11.8) | 415 (408) | 498 (490) |
| UC-61 - UC-64 | 51.85 (170.1) | 39.70 (130.2) | 3.67 (12.0) | 422 (415) | 504 (496) |
| UC-65 - UC-73 | 53.15 (174.4) | 40.30 (132.2) | 3.64 (11.9) | 427 (420) | 508 (500) |
| UC-74 - UC-79 | 52.11 (171.0) | 40.30 (132.2) | 3.65 (12.0) | 410 (400) | 493 (485) |

=== Propulsion ===
For surfaced propulsion, five types of six-cylinder, four-stroke diesel engines were used: Daimler produced the MU256 engine providing 330 brake horsepower (250 kW), Körting produced an engine providing 260 bhp (190 kW), (Note: Möller & Brack give this engine 270 horsepower on p.58 and 260 horsepower on p.145) Benz produced the OS32 which provided 300 bhp (220 kW) and MAN produced the 250 bhp (190 kW) S6V23/34 and the 300 bhp (220 kW) S6V26/36. For submerged propulsion, the first five Type UC II batches had two combined motor/generators of 170 kW (231 PS; 228 shp) each installed, whilst the last five batches had 230 kW (313 PS; 308 shp) combined motor/generators. Both types were produced by Siemens-Schuckert and by Brown, Boveri & Cie as well. Combined with the variations in dimensions, these variations in propulsion affected speed and range:

variations in speed and range of the Type UC II
| batch | variations | speed surfaced | speed submerged | range surfaced | range submerged | diesel | electrical |
|---|---|---|---|---|---|---|---|
| UC-16 - UC-24 | | 11.6 kn 21.5 km/h; 13.3 mph | 7.0 kn (13.0 km/h; 8.1 mph) | 9,430 nmi (17,460 km; 10,850 mi) | 55 nmi (102 km; 63 mi) | MAN S6V23/24 | BBC 170 kW |
| UC-25 - UC-33 | UC-25 - UC-27 | 11.6 kn 21.5 km/h; 13.3 mph | 6.7 kn (12.4 km/h; 7.7 mph) | 9,260 nmi (17,150 km; 10,660 mi) | 53 nmi (98 km; 61 mi) | MAN S6V23/24 | SSW 170 kW |
| UC-25 - UC-33 | UC-28 - UC-30 | 11.6 kn 21.5 km/h; 13.3 mph | 6.7 kn (12.4 km/h; 7.7 mph) | 9,410 nmi (17,430 km; 10,830 mi) | 53 nmi (98 km; 61 mi) | Daimler MU256 | SSW 170 kW |
| UC-25 - UC-33 | UC-31 - UC-33 | 11.6 kn 21.5 km/h; 13.3 mph | 6.7 kn (12.4 km/h; 7.7 mph) | 10,040 nmi (18,590 km; 11,550 mi) | 53 nmi (98 km; 61 mi) | MAN S6V23/24 | SSW 170 kW |
| UC-34 - UC-39 | UC-34 - UC-36 | 11.9 kn 22.0 km/h; 13.7 mph | 6.8 kn 12.6 km/h; 7.8 mph | 10,108 nmi (18,720 km; 11,632 mi) | 54 nmi (100 km; 62 mi) | MAN S6V23/24 | SSW 170 kW |
| UC-34 - UC-39 | UC-37 - UC-39 | 11.9 kn 22.0 km/h; 13.7 mph | 6.8 kn 12.6 km/h; 7.8 mph | 10,108 nmi (18,720 km; 11,632 mi) | 54 nmi (100 km; 62 mi) | MAN S6V26/36 | SSW 170 kW |
| UC-40 - UC-45 | | 11.7 kn (21.7 km/h; 13.5 mph) | 6.7 kn (12.4 km/h; 7.7 mph) | 9,410 nmi (17,430 km; 10,830 mi) | 60 nmi (110 km; 69 mi) | Körting | SSW 170 kW |
| UC-46 - UC-48 | | 11.7 kn (21.7 km/h; 13.5 mph) | 6.9 kn (12.8 km/h; 7.9 mph) | 7,280 nmi (13,480 km; 8,380 mi) | 54 nmi (100 km; 62 mi) | MAN S6V26/36 | SSW 170 kW |
| UC-49 - UC-54 | UC-49 - UC-50 | 11.8 kn (21.9 km/h; 13.6 mph) | 7.2 kn (13.3 km/h; 8.3 mph) | 8,820 nmi (16,330 km; 10,150 mi) | 56 nmi (104 km; 64 mi) | Benz (Note: Möller mentions a 300 horsepower engine from Körting, but the Benz engine has 300 horsepower, not the Körting) | BBC 230 kW |
| UC-49 - UC-54 | UC-51 - UC-54 | 11.8 kn (21.9 km/h; 13.6 mph) | 7.2 kn (13.3 km/h; 8.3 mph) | 8,820 nmi (16,330 km; 10,150 mi) | 56 nmi (104 km; 64 mi) | Daimler MU256 | BBC 230 kW |
| UC-55 - UC-60 | UC-55 - UC-57 | 11.6 kn 21.5 km/h; 13.3 mph | 7.3 kn (13.5 km/h; 8.4 mph) | 8,660 nmi (16,040 km; 9,970 mi) | 52 nmi (96 km; 60 mi) | Benz | BBC 230 kW |
| UC-55 - UC-60 | UC-58 - UC-60 | 11.6 kn 21.5 km/h; 13.3 mph | 7.3 kn (13.5 km/h; 8.4 mph) | 9,450 nmi (17,500 km; 10,870 mi) | 52 nmi (96 km; 60 mi) | Daimler MU256 | BBC 230 kW |
| UC-61 - UC-64 | | 11.9 kn (22.0 km/h; 13.7 mph) | 7.2 kn (13.3 km/h; 8.3 mph) | 8,000 nmi (15,000 km; 9,200 mi) | 59 nmi (109 km; 68 mi) | MAN S6V26/36 | SSW 230 KW |
| UC-65 - UC-73 | | 12 kn (22 km/h; 14 mph) | 7.4 kn (13.7 km/h; 8.5 mph) | 10,420 nmi (19,300 km; 11,990 mi) | 52 nmi (96 km; 60 mi) | MAN S6V26/36 | SSW 230 KW |
| UC-74 - UC-79 | UC-74 - UC-75 | 11.8 kn (21.9 km/h; 13.6 mph) | 7.3 kn (13.5 km/h; 8.4 mph) | 10,420 nmi (19,300 km; 11,990 mi) | 52 nmi (96 km; 60 mi) | Benz | SSW 230 KW |
| UC-74 - UC-79 | UC-76 - UC-79 | 11.8 kn (21.9 km/h; 13.6 mph) | 7.3 kn (13.5 km/h; 8.4 mph) | 10,420 nmi (19,300 km; 11,990 mi) | 52 nmi (96 km; 60 mi) | Daimler MU256 | SSW 230 KW |

=== Armament ===
Type UC II U-boats had two external torpedo tubes which could only be fired whilst submerged, and one internal torpedo tube aft. The aft torpedo compartment was very small; the two spare torpedoes had to disassembled in three parts for stowage. The external torpedo tubes had one spare torpedo each, which was also stored externally above the ballast tanks on the side, behind the torpedo tube. The bow compartment contained six 100-centimetre (39 in) mine shafts which contained three UC 120 mines each. The UC 120 was an anchored mine with contact fuzes and contained 120 kg (260 lb) of TNT explosives. The mine shafts were open and were integrated in the pressure hull so the mines were kept in wet storage and consequently the depth setting of the mines had to be fixed before the patrol and could not be altered anymore during the patrol. As constructed, the Type UC II received a 8.8 cm SK L/30 deck gun which was in 1918 replaced with a 10.5 cm SK L/45 on some boats.

== List of Type UC II submarines ==
There were 64 Type UC II submarines commissioned into the Imperial German Navy.

| Name | Date launched | Date Commissioned | Fate |
|---|---|---|---|
| UC-16 | 1 February 1916 | 26 June 1916 | Possibly sunk by a mine off Zeebrugge on 4 October 1917. |
| UC-17 | 19 February 1916 | 23 July 1916 | Surrendered on 26 November 1918. Scrapped 1919-1920 at Preston. |
| UC-18 | 4 March 1916 | 15 August 1916 | Sunk in the English Channel by gunfire from British Q-ship HMS Lady Olive on 19 February 1917. |
| UC-19 | 15 March 1916 | 22 August 1916 | Depth-charged in the English Channel by HMS Landrail on 6 December 1916. |
| UC-20 | 1 April 1916 | 8 September 1916 | Surrendered on 19 January 1919. Scrapped 1919-1920 at Preston. |
| UC-21 | 1 April 1916 | 15 September 1916 | Missing after 13 September 1917. |
| UC-22 | 1 February 1916 | 1 July 1916 | Surrendered to France on 3 February 1919. Scrapped in July 1921 at Landerneau. |
| UC-23 | 19 February 1916 | 28 July 1916 | Surrendered at Sevastopol on 14 November 1918. Scrapped in August 1921 at Bizerta. |
| UC-24 | 4 March 1916 | 17 August 1916 | Torpedoed and sunk by French submarine Circé off Cattaro (now Kotor) on 24 May 1917. Wreck found in late 2019. |
| UC-25 | 10 June 1916 | 28 June 1916 | Scuttled on 29 October 1918 off Pola when Austria-Hungary surrendered. |
| UC-26 | 22 June 1916 | 18 July 1916 | Rammed and sunk off Calais by HMS Milne on 9 May 1917. |
| UC-27 | 28 June 1916 | 25 July 1916 | Surrendered to France on 3 February 1919. Scrapped in July 1921 at Landerneau. |
| UC-28 | 8 July 1916 | 6 August 1916 | Surrendered to France on 12 February 1919 and later scrapped. |
| UC-29 | 15 July 1916 | 15 August 1916 | Ambushed and sunk by Q-ship HMS Pargust off the Irish coast on 7 June 1917. |
| UC-30 | 27 July 1916 | 22 August 1916 | Sunk by a mine off Horns Reef on 21 April 1917. |
| UC-31 | 7 August 1916 | 2 September 1916 | Surrendered on 26 November 1918 and scrapped in 1922 at Canning Town. |
| UC-32 | 12 August 1916 | 13 September 1916 | Sunk by its own mine on 23 February 1917. |
| UC-33 | 26 August 1916 | 25 September 1916 | Shelled, rammed and sunk in St. George's Channel by patrol boat PC61 on 24 May 1917. |
| UC-34 | 6 May 1916 | 26 September 1916 | Scuttled on 30 October 1918 off Pola when Austria-Hungary surrendered. |
| UC-35 | 6 May 1916 | 4 October 1916 | Sunk off South Sardinia by gunfire from French naval trawler Ailly on 16 May 1918. |
| UC-36 | 25 June 1916 | 3 November 1916 | Rammed and sunk by French steamer Molière off Ushant on 21 May 1917. |
| UC-37 | 5 June 1916 | 13 October 1916 | Surrendered at Sevastopol on 25 November 1918. Scrapped in August 1921 at Bizerta. |
| UC-38 | 5 June 1916 | 19 October 1916 | Depth-charged by French destroyers in the Gulf of Corinth on 14 December 1917. |
| UC-39 | 25 June 1916 | 29 October 1915 | Sunk off Flamborough Head by gunfire from HMS Thrasher on 8 February 1917. |
| UC-40 | 5 September 1916 | 1 October 1916 | Sank in the North Sea while in tow to surrender on 21 January 1919. |
| UC-41 | 13 September 1916 | 11 October 1916 | Depth-charged by British naval trawlers in the Tay estuary on 21 August 1917 following an explosion of one of its own mines. |
| UC-42 | 21 September 1916 | 18 November 1916 | Sunk by its own mine off the Irish coast on 10 September 1917. |
| UC-43 | 5 October 1916 | 25 October 1916 | Torpedoed and sunk by HMS G13 north of Muckle Flugga on 10 March 1917. |
| UC-44 | 10 October 1916 | 4 November 1916 | Sunk by its one of its own mines on 4 August 1917 off the Irish coast. Raised by the Royal Navy a month later and later scrapped. |
| UC-45 | 20 October 1916 | 18 November 1916 | Sank in a diving accident in the North Sea on 17 September 1917. Raised and surrendered in 1918. Scrapped in 1920 at Preston. |
| UC-46 | 15 July 1916 | 15 September 1916 | Rammed and sunk by HMS Liberty southeast of Goodwin Sands on 8 February 1917. |
| UC-47 | 30 August 1916 | 13 October 1916 | Rammed and depth-charged by British patrol boat P-57 off Flamborough Head on 18 November 1917. |
| UC-48 | 27 September 1915 | 6 November 1916 | Interned at Ferrol, Spain from 20 March 1918. |
| UC-49 | 7 November 1916 | 2 December 1916 | Sunk by a mine off Flanders on 14 August 1918. |
| UC-50 | 23 November 1916 | 21 December 1916 | Missing after 7 January 1918. |
| UC-51 | 5 December 1916 | 6 January 1917 | Sunk by a mine in the English Channel on 17 November 1917. |
| UC-52 | 23 January 1917 | 15 March 1917 | Surrendered on 16 January 1919. Scrapped in 1920 at Morecambe. |
| UC-53 | 27 February 1917 | 5 April 1917 | Scuttled on 28 October 1918 at Pola when Austria-Hungary surrendered. |
| UC-54 | 20 March 1917 | 10 May 1917 | Scuttled on 28 October 1918 at Trieste when Austria-Hungary surrendered. |
| UC-55 | 2 August 1916 | 15 November 1916 | Sank in diving accident off the Shetland Islands on 29 September 1917. |
| UC-56 | 26 August 1916 | 18 December 1916 | Interned at Santander, Spain from 24 May 1918. |
| UC-57 | 7 September 1916 | 22 January 1917 | Missing after 18 November 1917. Probably sunk by a mine in the Gulf of Finland. |
| UC-58 | 21 October 1916 | 12 March 1917 | Surrendered on 24 November 1918. Scrapped in 1921 in Cherbourg. |
| UC-59 | 28 September 1916 | 12 May 1917 | Surrendered on 21 November 1918. Scrapped 1919-20 in Bo'ness. |
| UC-60 | 8 November 1916 | 25 June 1917 | Surrendered on 23 February 1919. Scrapped in 1921 at Rainham. |
| UC-61 | 11 November 1916 | 13 December 1916 | Stranded at Wissant on 26 July 1917 and scuttled. |
| UC-62 | 9 December 1916 | 8 January 1917 | Sunk by a mine off Zeebrugge on 14 October 1917. |
| UC-63 | 6 January 1917 | 30 January 1917 | Torpedoed and sunk by HMS E52 off Goodwin Sands on 1 November 1917. |
| UC-64 | 27 January 1917 | 22 February 1917 | Sunk by a mine in the Dover Strait on 20 June 1918. |
| UC-65 | 8 June 1916 | 10 November 1916 | Torpedoed and sunk in the English Channel by HMS C15 on 3 November 1917. |
| UC-66 | 15 June 1916 | 18 November 1916 | Sunk in an attack by HM seaplane No. 8656 off the Icles of Scilly on 27 May 1917. Wreck found in 2009. |
| UC-67 | 6 August 1916 | 10 December 1916 | Surrendered on 16 January 1919. Scrapped in 1919-20 at Briton Ferry |
| UC-68 | 12 August 1916 | 17 December 1916 | Lost to unknown cause off The Lizard on 13 March 1917. |
| UC-69 | 12 August 1916 | 23 December 1916 | Accidentally rammed and sunk near Barfleur by U-96 on 6 December 1917. Wreck found by accident in November 2017. |
| UC-70 | 7 August 1916 | 22 November 1916 | Depth-charged off the eastern English coast by HMS Ouse on 28 August 1918. The wreck has since been declared a war grave. |
| UC-71 | 7 August 1916 | 28 November 1916 | Sank in the North Sea on 20 January 1919 on the way to surrender. Possibly scuttled. |
| UC-72 | 12 August 1916 | 5 December 1916 | Sunk by a mine in the Straits of Dover sometime after 24 August 1917. |
| UC-73 | 26 August 1916 | 24 December 1916 | Surrendered on 6 January 1919. Scrapped 1919-1920 at Briton Ferry. |
| UC-74 | 19 October 1916 | 26 November 1916 | Interned at Barcelona on 21 November 1918 when she ran out of fuel. Surrendered to France on 26 March 1919. Scrapped in July 1921 at Toulon. |
| UC-75 | 6 November 1916 | 6 December 1916 | Rammed and sunk in the North Sea by HMS Fairy on 31 May 1918. |
| UC-76 | 25 November 1916 | 17 December 1916 | Surrendered on 1 December 1918. Scrapped 1919-1920 at Briton Ferry. |
| UC-77 | 2 December 1916 | 29 December 1916 | Sunk by a mine off Flanders on 11 July 1918. |
| UC-78 | 8 December 1916 | 10 January 1917 | Rammed and sunk off Cherbourg by British steamer Queen Alexandra on 9 May 1918. |
| UC-79 | 19 December 1916 | 22 January 1917 | Sunk by a mine off Cap Gris-Nez in early April 1918. |

== Bibliography ==
- Herzog, Bodo (1993). Deutsche U-Boote : 1906 - 1966 [German U-boats : 1906 - 1966] (in German). Erlangen: Müller. ISBN 9783860700365.
- Möller, Eberhard; Brack, Werner (2004). The Encyclopedia of U-Boats. London: Chatham. ISBN 1-85367-623-3.
- Rössler, Eberhard (1981). The U-boat: The evolution and technical history of German submarines. London: Cassell & Co. ISBN 0-304-36120-8.
- Termote, Tomas (2014). Oorlog onder Water, Unterseeboots Flottille Flandern 1915-1918 [War below sea, submarine flottille Flanders 1915-1918] (in Dutch). Leuven: Davidsfonds. ISBN 978-90-5908-526-8.
