= SS Redesmere =

History
- Name: Redesmere
- Namesake: Redes Mere
- Owner: Watson Steamship Co. (1911–1916); Bromport Steamship Co. (1916–1917)
- Port of registry: (United Kingdom) Liverpool
- Builder: Sunderland Shipbuilding Co., Sunderland, England
- Launched: 7 September 1911
- Completed: 5 October 1911
- Identification: Official number: 124298
- Fate: Sunk by submarine, 28 October 1917

General characteristics
- Type: Freighter
- Tonnage: 2,123 gross register tons (GRT); 1,323 net register tons (NRT)
- Length: 290 ft (88.4 m)
- Beam: 42.7 ft (13.0 m)
- Draught: 19.5 ft (5.9 m)
- Installed power: 226 nhp; 1,200 ihp (890 kW)
- Propulsion: 1 screw propeller; 1 triple-expansion steam engine
- Speed: 9.75 knots (18.06 km/h; 11.22 mph)

SS Redesmere was a small freighter built during the First World War. Completed in 1915, she was intended for the West African trade. The ship was sunk by the German submarine SM U-70 in October 1917.

== Description ==
Redesmere had an overall length of 290 feet (88.4 m), with a beam of 42.7 feet (13.0 m) and a draught of 19.5 feet (5.9 m). The ship was assessed at 2,123 gross register tons (GRT) and 1,323 net register tons (NRT). She had a vertical triple-expansion steam engine driving a single screw propeller. The engine was rated at a total of 226 nominal horsepower and produced 1,200 indicated horsepower (890 kW). This gave her a maximum speed of 9.75 knots (18.06 km/h; 11.22 mph).

== Construction and career ==
Redesmere, named after Redes Mere, was laid down as yard number 266 by the Sunderland Shipbuilding Co. at its shipyard in Sunderland for the Watson Steamship Co. The ship was launched on 7 September 1911 and completed on 5 October. She was sold to the Lever Brothers' newly formed Bromport Steamship Co. on 11 May 1916. Redesmere was en route to Southampton from Barry, with a load of coal when she was torpedoed and sunk by UB-40 6 miles (9.7 km) west of St Catherine's Point on 28 October 1917 with the loss of 19 crewmen.

== Bibliography ==
- Admiralty (1988) [1919]. "Merchant Shipping (Losses): British Merchant Vessels Captured or Destroyed by the Enemy". British Vessels Lost at Sea, 1914-18 and 1939-45 (3rd ed.). Wellingborough, UK: Patrick Stephens. pp. 1–99. ISBN 1-85260-134-5.
- Fenton, Roy (December 2022). "Levers' Early Shipping Ventures: Bromport Steamship Co., Ltd. and its Predecessors". Marine News Supplement. 76 (12): S340–S352. ISSN 0966-6958.
