= Turcot =

Turcot may refer to:

== People ==
- Georges Turcot (1851–1908), Canadian politician.
- Gilles Turcot (1917–2010), Canadian general
- Jock Turcot (1943–1965), Canadian student organizer
- Marie-Rose Turcot (1887–1977), Canadian writer.
- Napoléon Turcot (1867–1939), Canadian politician.
- Susan Turcot (born 1966), Canadian artist

== Other uses ==
- Turcot Interchange, freeway in Canada
- Turcot, Quebec, village in Canada
- Turcot syndrome
