= List of shipwrecks in November 1918 =

The list of shipwrecks in November 1918 includes ships sunk, foundered, grounded, or otherwise lost during November 1918.

== 1 November ==
List of shipwrecks: 1 November 1918
Ship	State	Description
Galiano	Canada	The cargo ship foundered in the Pacific Ocean off Triangle Island, British Columbia with the loss of all hands.
Glena	Norway	The cargo ship foundered with the loss of all but two of her crew.
Tasmania	United Kingdom	The schooner was wrecked with the loss of five of her six crew.
SM U-72	Imperial German Navy	World War I: The Type UE I submarine was scuttled at Kotor, State of Slovenes, Croats and Serbs (42°30′N 18°41′E).
SMS Viribus Unitis	Slovene, Croat and Serbian Navy	World War I: The Tegetthoff-class battleship was sunk at Pula by an Italian human torpedo.
Wien	State of Slovenes, Croats and Serbs	The ocean liner was mined and sunk at Pula by Regia Marina forces.

== 2 November ==
List of shipwrecks: 2 November 1918
Ship	State	Description
HMT Charles Hammond	Royal Navy	The naval trawler was lost in the North Sea.
Devonshire	United Kingdom	The ship was driven ashore east of swansea, Glamorgan. Her thirteen crew were rescued by the Mumbles Lifeboat.
Douro	Portugal	The schooner foundered with the loss of all hands.
Estrella	Brazil	The barque foundered in the Atlantic Ocean 16 nautical miles (30 km) off Camocim.
Murcia	United Kingdom	World War I: The cargo ship was torpedoed and sunk in the Mediterranean Sea 12 nautical miles (22 km) north of Port Said, Egypt (31°26′N 32°21′E) by SM UC-74 (Imperial German Navy) with the loss of a crew member.
Port Hunter	United Kingdom	Carrying general cargo and war supplies, the 4,062-gross register ton cargo ship sank without loss of life in 30 to 70 feet (9.1 to 21.3 m) of water on Hedge Fence Shoal in Vineyard Sound off the coast of Massachusetts, 1.75 nautical miles (3.2 km; 2.0 mi) north-northeast of East Chop, Martha's Vineyard, at 41°29′43″N 070°33′15″W after colliding in fog with the tug Covington (United States).
HMT Riparvo	Royal Navy	The naval trawler was lost in the Mediterranean Sea.
SMS S61	Imperial German Navy	World War I: The S49-class torpedo boat was scuttled in the Terneuzen Canal in Belgium.
Surada	United Kingdom	World War I: The cargo ship was torpedoed and sunk in the Mediterranean Sea off Port Said (31°34′N 32°21′E), Egypt, by the submarine SM UC-74 (Imperial German Navy). Her crew survived.
SMS V47	Imperial German Navy	World War I: The V43-class destroyer was scuttled in the Terneuzen Canal in Belgium.
SMS V67	Imperial German Navy	World War I: The V67-class destroyer was scuttled in the Terneuzen Canal in Belgium.
SMS V77	Imperial German Navy	World War I: The V67-class destroyer was scuttled in the Terneuzen Canal in Belgium.
SMS V69	Imperial German Navy	World War I: The V67-class destroyer was scuttled at Ghent, East Flanders, Belgium.

== 3 November ==
List of shipwrecks: 3 November 1918
Ship	State	Description
Devonshire	United Kingdom	The cargo ship was wrecked. Her crew were rescued by a lifeboat.
Mineola	United States	The steamer was destroyed by fire at Bar Harbor, Maine. Four crew died.
Motala Ström	Sweden	World War I: The cargo ship disappeared with all hands in the North Sea, east of Shetland, after the convoy she was part of was scattered by adverse weather. Several explosions were heard, so the ship likely had struck a mine. 18 casualties.

== 4 November ==
List of shipwrecks: 4 November 1918
Ship	State	Description
Lynn	United States	The steamer sank in a collision with America (flag unknown) in Lake Huron at the entrance to the St. Clair River.
Mimosa	Sweden	World War I: The cargo ship sank after a collision while in convoy from Tyne, destined for Gothenburg. The crew survived.
HMS P12	Royal Navy	The P-class sloop collided with another vessel and sank in the English Channel (50°39′40″N 1°05′00″W).
War Roach	United Kingdom	World War I: The cargo ship struck a mine and was damaged in the Mediterranean Sea off Port Said, Egypt (31°19′N 29°48′E). She was beached but was later refloated, repaired and returned to service.

== 5 November ==
List of shipwrecks: 5 November 1918
Ship	State	Description
HMS Campania	Royal Navy	HMS Campania The seaplane tender collided with HMS Royal Oak and then HMS Glorious (both Royal Navy) in the Firth of Forth and sank. The wreck was cleared in 1923.
Epic	United Kingdom	The Admiralty tug was beached whilst attempting to refloat Lake Harris (United States) at Penzance.
Ilwaco	United States	During a voyage from Petersburg, Territory of Alaska, to Anacortes, Washington, with a crew of seven and a cargo of 17 1/2 tons of barreled salmon aboard, the 61-gross register ton motor vessel was wrecked without loss of life in fog on Green Point (54°34′N 130°41′W) in Chatham Sound in the waters of British Columbia, approximately 1 nautical mile (1.9 km; 1.2 mi) south of the border between British Columbia and the Territory of Alaska. Her crew was rescued from shore by the steamer Humboldt (flag unknown).
Lake Harris	United States	World War I: The armed cargo ship was beached near Penzance railway station, Cornwall after a gunfight in the Atlantic Ocean off Land's End with a surfaced German submarine.
Stavnos	Italy	World War I: The sailing vessel was sunk in the Mediterranean Sea off the coast of Egypt by SM UC-74 (Imperial German Navy).
Wallacut	United States	The schooner was driven ashore at Marshfield, Oregon and wrecked.

== 6 November ==
List of shipwrecks: 6 November 1918
Ship	State	Description
Bernisse	Netherlands	World War I: The cargo ship struck a mine and sank in the Baltic Sea off Öland, Sweden. She was later raised, repaired and returned to service.
USS Jolly Roger	United States Navy	The patrol vessel was dropped from a crane and broke in two and damaged beyond repair whilst being loaded aboard USS Kanawha (United States Navy).
USS Lake Domita	United States Navy	The cargo ship struck an obstruction, grounded and sank in Anse de Bertheaume on the north shore of the entrance to the harbor of Brest, France.

== 7 November ==
List of shipwrecks: 7 November 1918
Ship	State	Description
Conster	United Kingdom	World War I: The fishing smack struck a mine and sank in the English Channel off Rye, Sussex.
Trebiskin	United Kingdom	The ketch was lost on the Mixon Shoal, in the Bristol Channel with the loss of all hands.

== 8 November ==
List of shipwrecks: 8 November 1918
Ship	State	Description
Barge No. 1	United States	The wooden barge ran aground on a reef off the coast of Michigan at the southern point of Thunder Bay in a storm and quickly broke up and sank in 42 feet (13 m) of water at 45.015317°N 83.303967°W.

== 9 November ==
List of shipwrecks: 9 November 1918
Ship	State	Description
HMS Blazer	Royal Navy	The naval tug hit The Steval and sank near Conger Ledge, Scilly.
HMS Britannia	Royal Navy	HMS Britannia sinking. World War I: The King Edward VII-class battleship was torpedoed and sunk in the Strait of Gibraltar by the submarine SM UB-50 (Imperial German Navy) with the loss of 50 of her 762 crew.
USS Saetia	United States Navy	World War I: The cargo ship struck a mine – probably laid by the submarine SM U-117 (Imperial German Navy) – and sank in the Atlantic Ocean off Fenwick Island, Delaware, 10 nautical miles (19 km) south-southeast of the Fenwick Island Lightship without loss of life. Nineteen of her crew in two life rafts were rescued by the steamship Kennebec (flag unknown) and landed at Cape May, New Jersey, and the other 66 members of her crew landed at Ocean City, Maryland, in four lifeboats.

== 10 November ==
List of shipwrecks: 10 November 1918
Ship	State	Description
Admiral Kornilov	Russia White Movement	Russian Civil War: The steamer, being used as a headquarters ship by General Lazar Bicherakhov, was destroyed by fire at Petrovsk. The cause was possibly arson/sabotage.
HMS Ascot	Royal Navy	World War I: The Racecourse-class minesweeper was torpedoed and sunk in the North Sea off the Farne Islands, Northumberland (55°38′N 1°30′W) by SM UB-67 (Imperial German Navy) with the loss of 51 of her crew.
HMT Renarro	Royal Navy	World War I: The naval trawler struck a mine and sank in the Dardanelles with some loss of life.
36PN	Regia Marina	World War I: The PN-class torpedo boat struck a mine and sank in the Adriatic Sea off the Cape of Rodon, Albania.

== 11 November ==
List of shipwrecks: 11 November 1918
Ship	State	Description
SMS Berlin II	Imperial German Navy	The Vorpostenboot was lost.
SMS Feronia	Imperial German Navy	World War I: The depôt ship was scuttled at Antwerp, Belgium.
USS Ophir	United States Navy	The cargo and passenger ship suffered an explosion on 8 November and caught fire in the Mediterranean Sea. She sank on 11 November in Gibraltar Harbour. Cargo was destroyed. Two crew killed. The wreck was raised 10 February 1919, repaired, and returned to the US in January 1920, but laid up until 1922 and scrapped.

== 12 November ==
List of shipwrecks: 12 November 1918
Ship	State	Description
Halcyon	United States	While anchored in lay-up for the winter with no one aboard, the 68-gross register ton motor vessel broke her mooring lines and sank in Akutan Bay (54.2262°N 165.7486°W) on Akutan Island off Akutan in the Aleutian Islands.
USS Seven	United States Navy	The 20-foot (6.1 m) aviator rescue motorboat was disposed of by burning, probably in the Norfolk, Virginia area.

== 13 November ==
List of shipwrecks: 13 November 1918
Ship	State	Description
Carabinier	French Navy	The Spahi-class destroyer ran aground at Latakia, Syria. She was scuttled on 15 November.

== 14 November ==
List of shipwrecks: 14 November 1918
Ship	State	Description
HMS Cochrane	Royal Navy	The Warrior-class cruiser ran aground in the River Mersey. She later broke in two and was a total loss. The wreck was scrapped in situ in 1919.

== 15 November ==
List of shipwrecks: 15 November 1918
Ship	State	Description
USS Elizabeth	United States Navy	The patrol vessel was wrecked at the mouth of the Brazos River, near Freeport, Texas.

== 16 November ==
List of shipwrecks: 16 November 1918
Ship	State	Description
Cesare Rossarol	Regia Marina	World War I: The scout cruiser struck a mine and sank in the Adriatic Sea off the Istrian Peninsula, State of Slovenes, Croats and Serbs.

== 18 November ==
List of shipwrecks: 18 November 1918
Ship	State	Description
Stasia	France	The schooner caught fire at Shanghai, China and was scuttled to extinguish the fire. Note however that the log of the gunboat HMS Gnat (Royal Navy) records being called on to sink a burning ship by gunfire, in the International Dock Shanghai, on 14 November, so this is presumably the same incident.
SM U-165	Imperial German Navy	The Type U 93 submarine sank in the Weser (53°10′N 8°53′E). She was raised on 21 February 1919 and subsequently scrapped.

== 20 November ==
List of shipwrecks: 20 November 1918
Ship	State	Description
Per Brahe	Sweden	The ferry foundered in Lake Wetter with the loss of all on board.
SMS V30	Imperial German Navy	World War I: The V25-class torpedo boat was sunk by mines on the way to Internment at Scapa Flow.

== 21 November ==
List of shipwrecks: 21 November 1918
Ship	State	Description
SM U-97	Imperial German Navy	The Type U 93 submarine sank in the North Sea (52°25′N 3°10′E).

== 22 November ==
List of shipwrecks: 22 November 1918
Ship	State	Description
HMS G11	Royal Navy	The G-class submarine ran aground at Howick, Northumberland and was wrecked with the loss of two of her 31 crew.

== 24 November ==
List of shipwrecks: 24 November 1918
Ship	State	Description
Cerisoles	French Navy	The Navarin-class minesweeper foundered with all hands in a storm on Lake Superior.
Inkerman	French Navy	The Navarin-class minesweeper foundered with all hands in a storm on Lake Superior.
Uranienborg	Denmark	The cargo ship struck a mine and sank in Aalbeck Bay with the loss of a crew member.

== 26 November ==
List of shipwrecks: 26 November 1918
Ship	State	Description
USS Bonita	United States Navy	The 46-foot (14 m) patrol vessel collided with the fishing schooner Russell (United States) at Coast Guard Station No. 25, Boston, Massachusetts and sank.
Nanset	Norway	The ship ran aground in Oxwich Bay in foggy weather. Her crew survived. She subsequently capsized and was a total loss.

== 27 November ==
List of shipwrecks: 27 November 1918
Ship	State	Description
City of Lahore	United Kingdom	The cargo ship caught fire and sank at New York, United States.
J. A. McKee	Canada	The steamer went ashore on Fishers Island, New York. Refloated and returned to service.

== Unknown date ==
List of shipwrecks: Unknown date 1918
Ship	State	Description
Star	United States	When a storm struck while she was at anchor in Berners Bay in Southeast Alaska with no one aboard, the 9-gross register ton, 34.3-foot (10.5 m) fishing vessel was blown ashore and smashed to pieces on the beach by the surf.
