= Canadian Car and Foundry =

Canadian corporation (1909–1996)

- Industry: Manufacturing
- Founded: 29 October 1909
- Defunct: 30 December 1996
- Fate: Dissolved by parent company HSC
- Headquarters: Montreal, Quebec
- Parent: Avro Canada (1955–1962); Hawker Siddeley Canada (1962–1996)

The Canadian Car & Foundry Company, Limited, and from 1957 onwards the Canadian Car Company Limited, was a manufacturer of buses, railway rolling stock, forestry equipment, and later aircraft for the Canadian market. CC&F history goes back to 1897, but the main company was established in 1909 from an amalgamation of several companies and later became part of Hawker Siddeley Canada through the purchase by A.V. Roe Canada in 1957. Today the remaining factories are part of Alstom after its acquisition of Bombardier Transportation completed in 2021.

Canadian Car was one of three corporate combinations formed by the Lord Beaverbrook in 1909, the others being Canada Cement and Stelco.

== History ==
Canadian Car & Foundry (CC&F) was established in 1909 in Montreal as the result of an amalgamation of three companies:

- Rhodes Curry Company of Amherst, NS - founded 1891
- Canada Car Company of Turcot, QC - founded 1905
- Dominion Car and Foundry of Montreal, QC

In 1911 the CC&F Board of Directors recognized that the company could improve its efficiency if they were able to produce their own steel castings, a component that was becoming common to all their products. They purchased Montreal Steel Works Limited at Longue-Pointe, the largest producer of steel castings in Canada, and the Ontario Iron & Steel Company, Ltd. at Welland, ON, which included both a steel foundry and a rolling mill.

Buses and Forestry Equipment were produced at Fort William, Ontario and railcars in Montreal and Amherst. Streetcars were manufactured between 1897 and 1913, however the company focused exclusively on rebuilding existing streetcars after 1913.

A few years later, CC&F acquired the assets of Pratt & Letchworth, a Brantford, ON, rail car manufacturer. In the latter part of World War I, the expanding company opened a new plant in Fort William (now Thunder Bay) to manufacture rail cars and ships which included the French minesweepers Inkerman and Cerisoles which were both lost in Lake Superior; the Amherst plant started by Rhodes & Curry in Amherst was closed in 1931. In an attempt to enter the aviation market, CC&F produced a small series of Grumman G.23 Goblin aircraft under licence and developed an unsuccessful, indigenous-designed fighter biplane, the Gregor FDB-1.

=== Canada Car Company ===
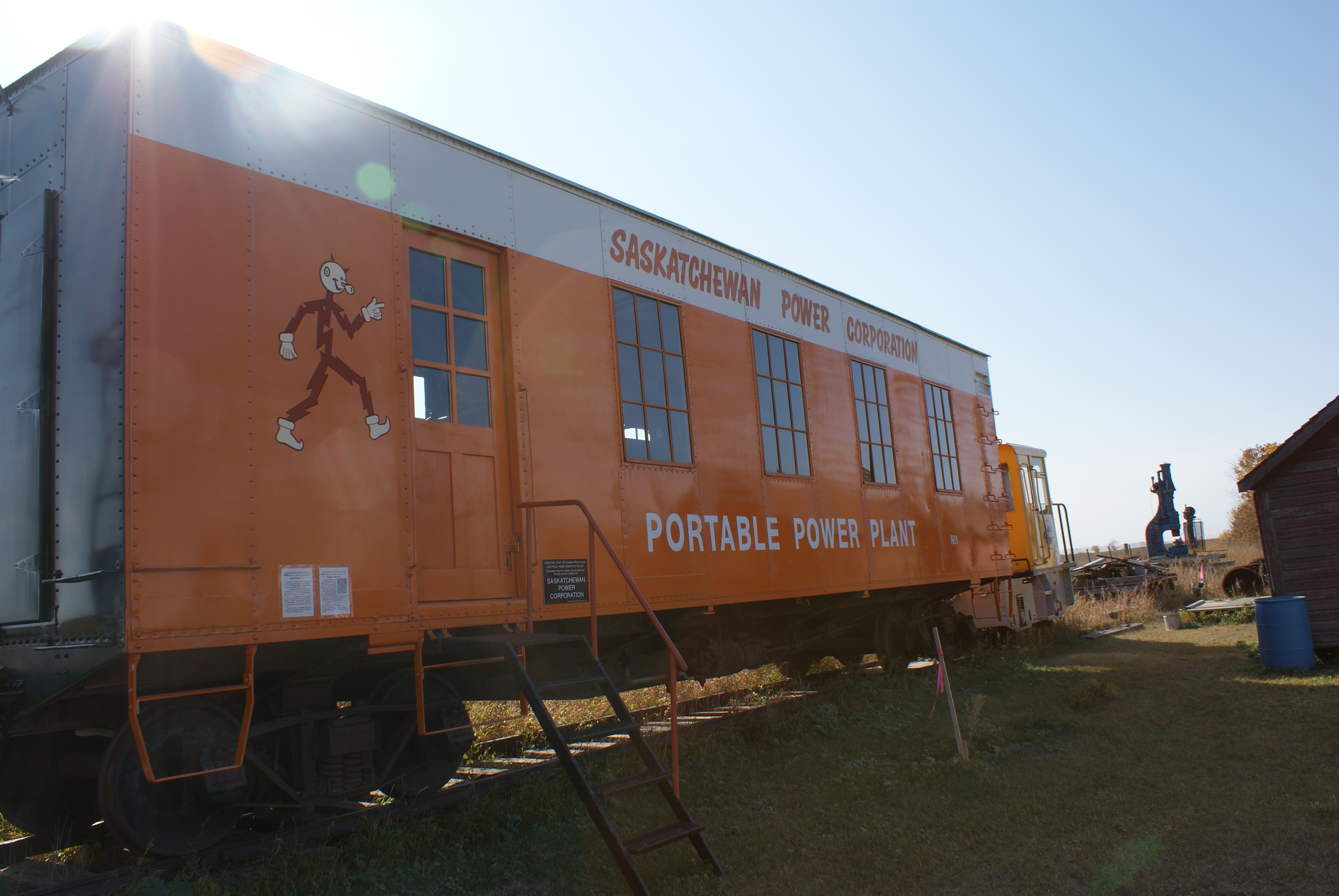
Portable power plant built by Canadian Car and Foundry

Canada Car Company was a railcar manufacturer based in Turcot, Quebec (a suburb of Montreal), which later merged with several other companies to form Canadian Car and Foundry in 1909. Canada Car Company was incorporated January 1905 with W.P. Coleman as president and Sir Hugh Allan as vice-president. The company's plant began operations in 1905 and manufactured freight and passenger cars.

Clients included:

- Grand Trunk Railway and Grand Trunk Pacific Railway - 12,000 freight cars and 250 passenger cars (wood)
- Quebec, Montreal & Southern - 1,500 steel underframe box cars with Dominion Car and Foundry
- Montreal Street Railway - 10 streetcars
- Hart-Otis Car Company - Hart convertible ballast cars
- Grand Trunk Railway - 30 steel underframe flat cars
- Temiskaming & Northern Ontario Railway - three parlour-cafe cars
- Canadian Northern Railway - four wooden dining cars

Their products were:

- wood freight and passenger cars
- box cars
- streetcars
- flat cars
- parlor cafe cars
- dining cars

=== First World War ===
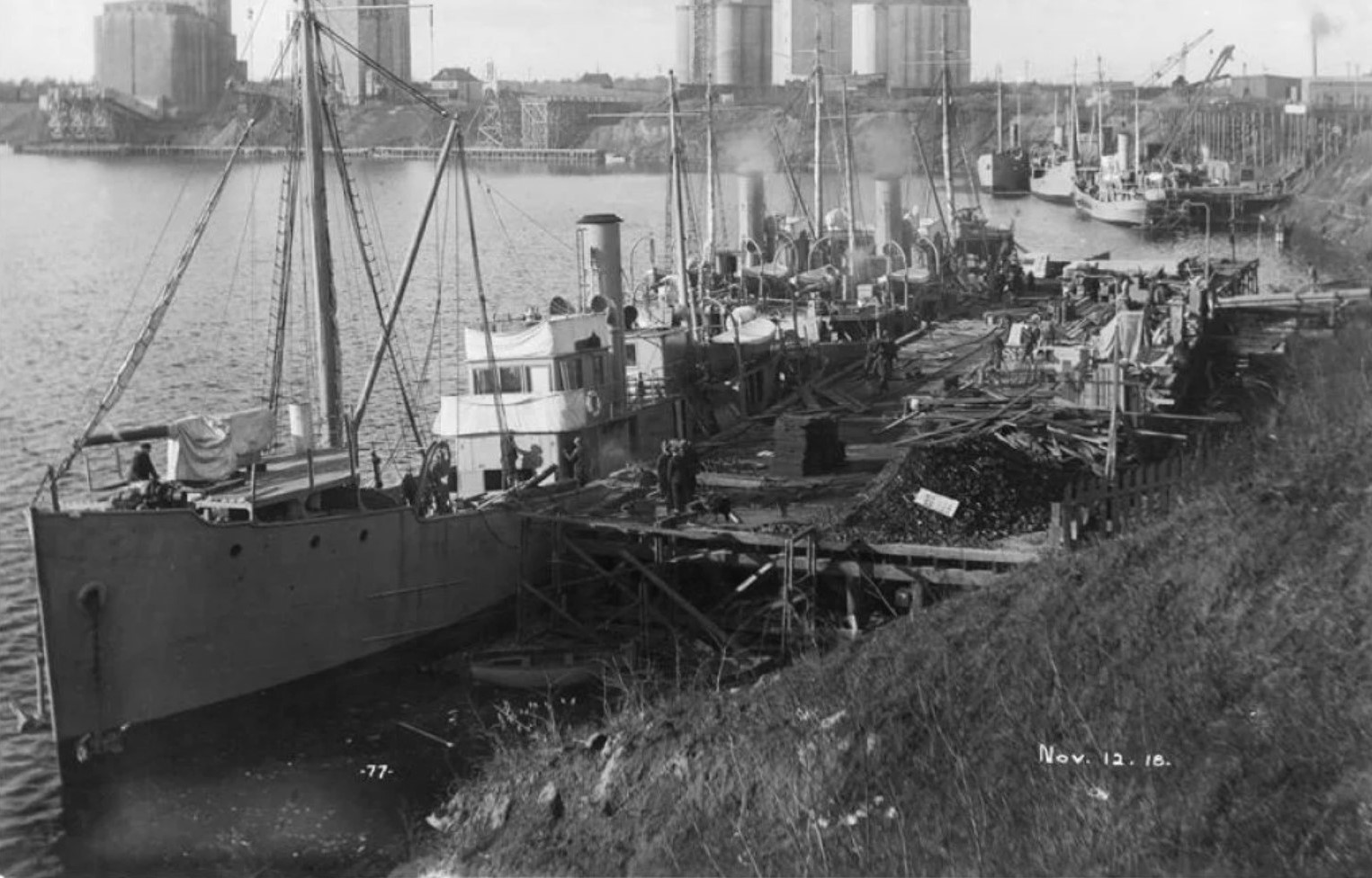
Navarin-class minesweepers

During World War I, CC&F had signed large contracts with Russia and Britain for delivery of ammunition. An enormous factory was constructed in the Kingsland to assemble, package, and prepare artillery shells for shipment to foreign ports. No shells were manufactured there. On 11 January 1917, a fire started in one of the buildings. In four hours, the fire spread to the approximately 500,000 pieces of 3-inch (76 mm) explosive shells stored there, causing several explosions, destroying the entire plant. The explosion launched artillery shells and building debris across the area, destroying several homes and businesses in the nearby town of Lyndhurst, New Jersey, and was visible from New York City. The total loss, including the ordnance, was estimated at $16,750,000 (equivalent to $427 million in 2025).

Canadian Car and Foundry had a contract to build 12 Navarin-class minesweepers for the French Navy. The vessels were completed in the fall of 1918—before the war ended, but too late to see operational service. Two of the vessels, the Inkerman and Cerisoles, were lost in a November gale, on Lake Superior, on their maiden voyage. Other vessels were sold into civilian service.

The government of the Russian Soviet Republic ordered 500 bogie tank cars. They were shipped from Montreal to Novorossiysk on Canadian Merchant Navy steamships at the end of 1921.

=== Second World War ===
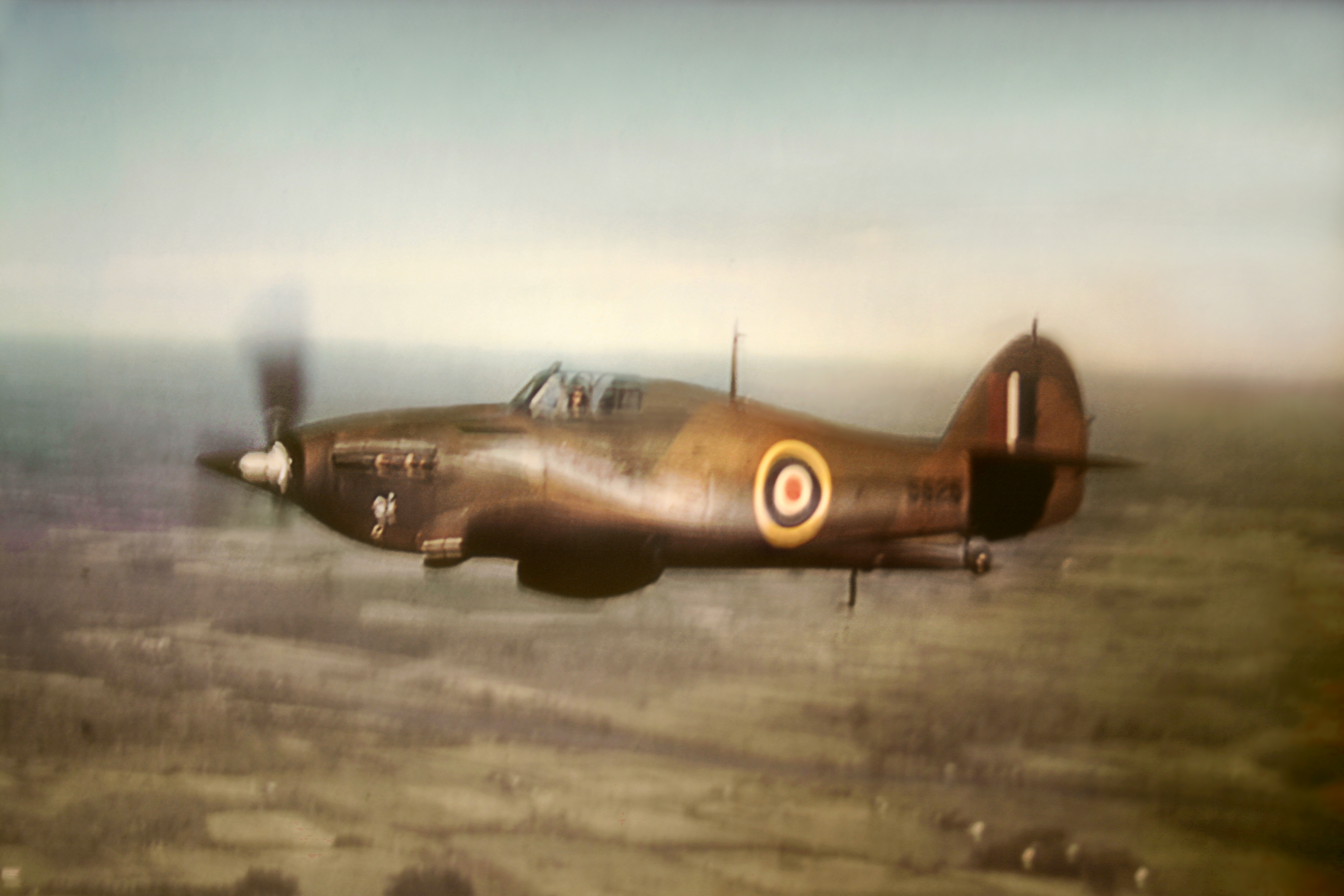
CC&F Hawker Hurricane X on a test flight over Fort William, Ontario

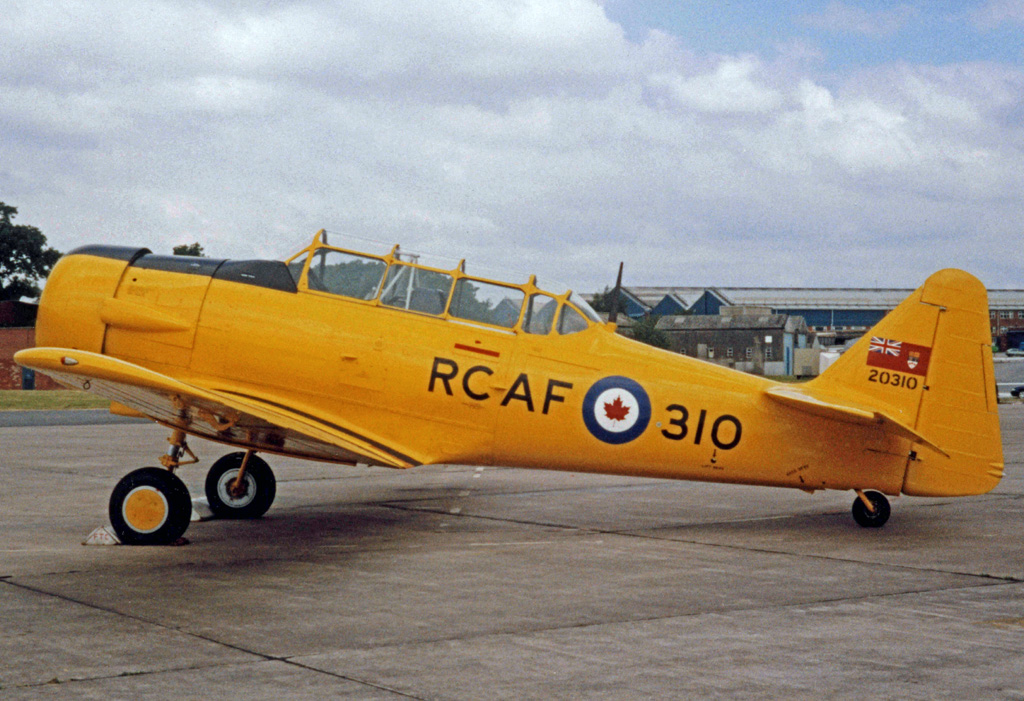
CC&F-built Harvard Mk.4

By 1939, with war on the horizon, Canadian Car & Foundry and its Chief Engineer, Elsie MacGill, were contracted by the Royal Air Force to produce the Hawker Hurricane (Marks X, XI and XII). Refinements introduced by MacGill on the Hurricane included skis and de-icing gear. When the production of the Hurricane was complete in 1943, CC&F's workforce of 4,500 (half of them women) had built over 1,400 aircraft, about 10% of all Hurricanes built.

Following the success of the Hurricane contract, CC&F sought out and received a production order for the Curtiss SB2C Helldiver. Eventually, 834 Helldivers were produced by CC&F in various versions from SBW-1, SBW-1B, SBW-3, SBW-4E and SBW-5. Some of the Curtiss divebombers were sent directly to the Royal Navy under Lend-Lease arrangements. CC&F also built the North American Harvard under licence, many of the aircraft being supplied to European air forces to train post war military pilots.

In 1944, the Canadian Car & Foundry built a revolutionary new aircraft in its Montreal shops - the Burnelli CBY-3, also called the Loadmaster. There were two examples built of an aerofoil-fuselage design originally developed by Vincent J. Burnelli. The CBY-3 was never to enter full-scale production and was cancelled less than one year later.

The work of Canadian women building fighter and bomber aircraft at the plant during the Second World War is documented in the 1999 National Film Board of Canada documentary film Rosies of the North.

=== Postwar developments ===
After the Second World War, the CC&F returned to its roots as a rail car manufacturer. They also made a successful leap into the streetcar business, supplying Montreal, Toronto, Regina, Calgary, Vancouver, Edmonton, and the Brazilian cities of Rio de Janeiro and São Paulo with various types of streetcars. The company concluded a licensing agreement with ACF-Brill (the successor to J. G. Brill) in 1944 to manufacture and sell throughout Canada buses and trolley coaches of ACF-Brill design as Canadian Car-Brill, in later years often written "CCF-Brill", for short. CC&F built 1,114 trolley buses and a few thousand buses under the name. Trolleybus production ended in 1954; Edmonton Transit System's No. 202, a 1954 CCF-Brill T48A, was the last Brill trolleybus built for any city.

Production of the Brill diesel bus continued through the 1950s. In 1960, CC&F launched an entirely new TD bus design under the Canadian Car name to compete with the General Motors New Look model, but it was not successful and production was discontinued in 1962.

In 1957, wishing to diversify, the British Hawker Siddeley Group acquired CC&F through its Canadian subsidiary, A.V. Roe Canada Ltd. In 1962, A.V. Roe Canada was dissolved when the Avro Arrow program was suddenly terminated, and its assets became part of Hawker Siddeley Canada. During the 1970s they introduced the BiLevel Coach heavy railway passenger car, which would go on to great success.

In the late 1970s and early 1980s the plant built 190 Canadian Light Rail Vehicles, for the Toronto Transit Commission, to replace its aging PCC streetcars.

CCF re-emerged as Can-Car Rail in 1983 as a joint division between Hawker Siddeley Canada and UTDC. The Can-Car Rail operations were based in Thunder Bay. Sold to SNC-Lavalin in 1986, a financial shakeup led to the firm being returned to the Government of Ontario, and then quickly re-sold to Bombardier Transportation. Through a series of further acquisitions, mergers and rationalisations, CC&F faded from the annals of significant Canadian manufacturers, although the company still exists today as the Alstom railcar facility in Thunder Bay, Ontario.

== Products ==
=== Railway carriages ===
- railway carriages for the Intercolonial Railway
- railway carriages for the Grand Trunk Railway
- railway carriages for the Grand Trunk Pacific
- railway carriages for the Canadian Northern Railways
- railway carriages for the Canadian Pacific Railway
- railway carriages for the Canadian National Railways (some later operated by Via Rail or Rocky Mountaineer)
- bi-level carriages for GO Transit - with Hawker Siddeley Canada and SNC Lavalin

=== Buses, trolleys and streetcars ===
- CCF-Brill 44S motor bus (under license in Fort William)
- CCF-Brill T44/T44A trolley bus (under license in Fort William), 1946–54
- CCF-Brill T48/T48A/T48SP trolley bus (under license in Fort William), 1949-54
- CCF-Brill TD43 motor bus (under license in Fort William)
- CCF-Brill TD51 motor bus (under license in Fort William)
- CN electric multiple units for use in Montreal
- Presidents' Conference Committee Car A6 SE DT
- Presidents' Conference Committee Car A7 SE DT
- Presidents' Conference Committee Car A8 SE DT
- Small Peter Witt cars with Ottawa Car Company
- Large Peter Witt car and trailers with J. G. Brill and Company

=== Aircraft ===
- Avro Anson Mk.II (341 built under licence plus 800 wings and 300 fuselages.)
- Avro Anson Mk.V (300 built)
- Beechcraft T-34A Mentor (125 built under license, 25 for RCAF and 100 for the United States Air Force)
- Canadian Car and Foundry CBY-3 Loadmaster (one built)
- Canadian Car and Foundry Harvard Mk.4/T-6J (555 built by CC&F post-war for RCAF and USAF for Military Defense Aid Pact)
- Canadian Car and Foundry Maple Leaf Trainer I (Wallace project, one built)
- Canadian Car and Foundry Maple Leaf Trainer II (one built and jigs and parts sold to Mexico where it became the Ares #2)
- Canadian Car and Foundry (Curtiss) SBW Helldiver (835 built under license)
- Gregor FDB-1 (one built)
- Grumman G.23 Goblin I/Delfín (52 built under license, examples sold to Spanish Republican Air Force and Royal Canadian Air Force (RCAF))
- Hawker Hurricane Mk.X, XI & XII (1,451 built under license)
- North American Harvard Mk.IIB/AT-16 (1,798 built under license)
- Noorduyn Norseman Mk.V (51 built after buying Noorduyn out)
- Noorduyn Norseman Mk.VII (1 built after extensive Can Car redesign)

=== Other vehicles and equipment ===
- Tanks for World War II
- Bobcat (armoured personnel carrier) - 1 prototype built and project terminated; originally developed by Leyland (Canada) which was bought out by Canadian Car and Foundry (itself acquired by Avro Canada) and terminated under Hawker Siddeley Canada
- TreeFarmer Forestry Heavy Equipment (under license from Garrett Enumclaw Co.)
- Canada Diesel and Canada Diesel WT highway tractors.

== Customers ==
- British Columbia Electric Railway
- Canadian Northern Railways
- Canadian Pacific Railway
- Canadian National Railways
- Chambly Transport
- Edmonton Transit System
- Grand Trunk Railway
- Hamilton Street Railway
- Intercolonial Railway
- Nova Scotia Light and Power Company, Limited
- Ottawa Transportation Commission
- Quebec Railway, Light and Power Company (later Québec Autobus, post–1959)
- Royal Canadian Air Force (RCAF)
- Société de transport de Montréal
- Toronto Transportation Commission
- United States Air Force (USAF)

== Preservation ==
Many CC&F-built buses have been preserved as historic vehicles, some in operating condition. For example, the Transit Museum Society, in Vancouver, has at least seven CC&F buses in its collection, including two CC&F-Brill trolleybuses.

== Leadership ==
=== President ===
1. Nathaniel Curry, 29 October 1909 – 30 January 1919
2. Wilson Workman Butler, 30 January 1919– 18 June 1937 †
3. Victor Montague Drury, 1 September 1937– 21 April 1953
4. Edwin Joseph Cosford, 21 April 1953 – June 1957
5. Allan Cavanagh MacDonald, June 1957 – 1 December 1957
6. Stephen Gately Harwood, 1 December 1957 – November 1960

=== Chairman of the Board ===
1. Nathaniel Curry, 30 January 1919 – 23 October 1931 †
2. Sir Roy Hardy Dobson, October 1955 – June 1957
3. Edwin Joseph Cosford, June 1957 – March 1960

== See also ==
- J. G. Brill and Company
- Preston Car Company
- Ottawa Car Company
- Niles Car and Manufacturing Company
- Noorduyn Aviation - CC&F later built their Norseman utility aircraft (1946)
- American Car and Foundry

== Notes ==
=== Bibliography ===
- "Canadian Car and Foundry". Avroland.
- "Canadian Car and Foundry". my Canadian Transit information web site. 24 September 2001. Archived from the original on 5 March 2003 – via Angelfire.
- Green, William; Swanborough, Gordon (February–May 1979). "A Grumman by Any Other Name...". Air Enthusiast. No. 9. pp. 26–39. ISSN 0143-5450.
- Kemp, David (1991). "Can-Car — Canada's Largest". Air Enthusiast. No. 44. pp. 10–16. ISSN 0143-5450.
- Martin, J.E. "On A Streak of Lightning". Electric Railways Cars in Canada. p. 99.
