= Bobcat (armoured personnel carrier) =

Canadian armoured personnel carrier

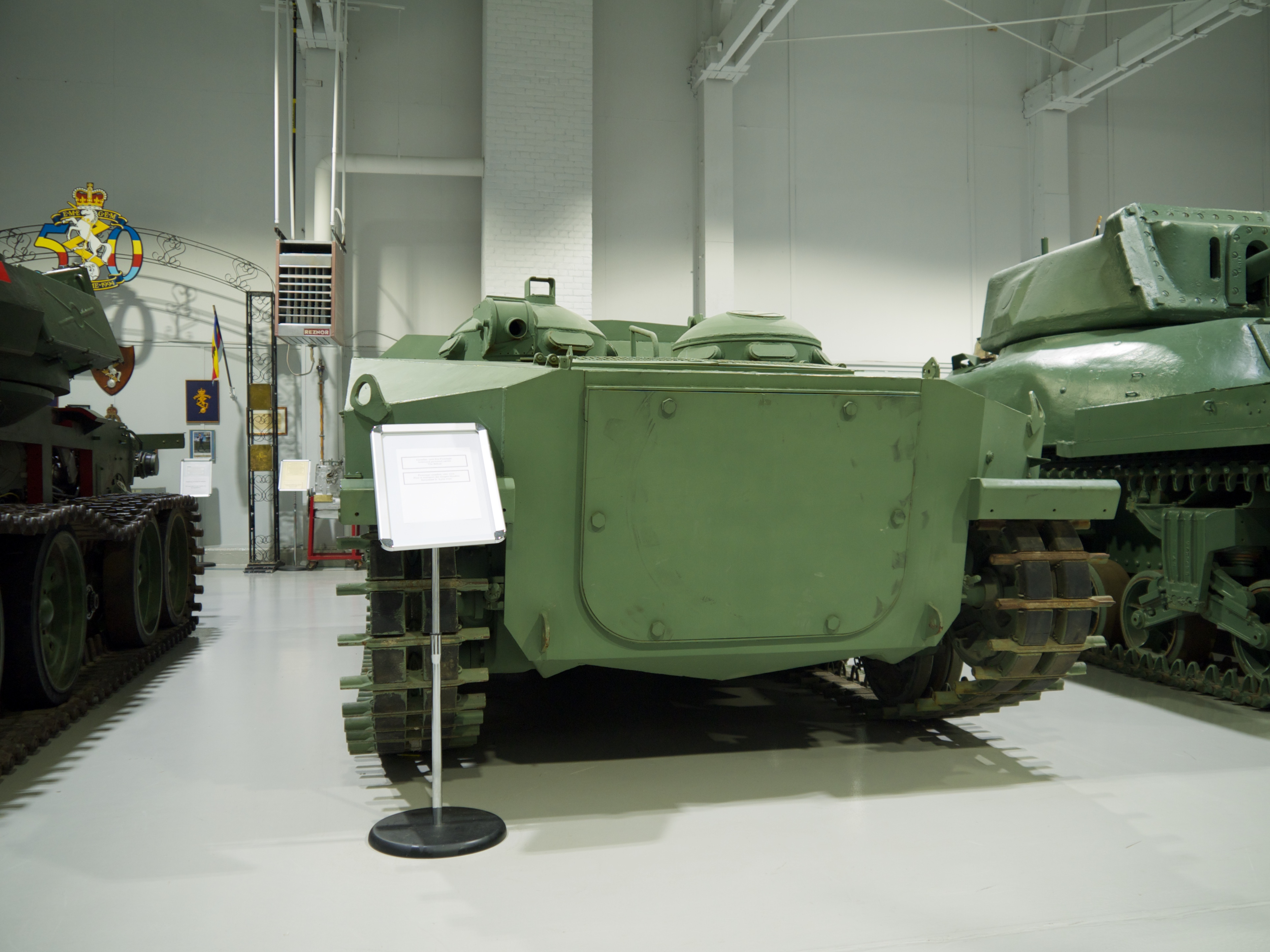
Bobcat prototype at Base Borden Military Museum

The Bobcat was an armored personnel carrier (APC) designed and built in Canada in the 1950s and early 1960s. A lengthy development period and changing requirements drove the price up while not improving the basic design, and the project was eventually cancelled in late 1963 in favor of purchasing the ubiquitous M113.

== History ==
During World War II the Canadian Army introduced the fully tracked APC to the world when they converted a number of M7 Priest and Ram tanks to expedient personnel carriers before Operation Totalize. Existing designs were almost universally half-tracks, or lightly armored tracked vehicles not really designed for the APC role, like the Universal Carrier. These expedient vehicles, named "Kangaroos", were considerably better armored and had much better cross-country performance. Similar vehicles were soon in use by other allied forces as well, converted from broken or out-of-date tanks.

In the post-war period the Canadian Army, like its other western counterparts, underwent a period of dramatic downsizing. By the late 1940s it was essentially identical in formation and equipment as it had been during the war, but much smaller. With the cooling of international relations that marked the start of the Cold War, and especially with the opening of the Korean War, the Canadian armed forces started the process of rapidly modernizing their equipment, which was by this point extremely outdated.

The Bobcat project started in 1952, intending to produce a fully modern replacement for the Kangaroo in the APC role. Over the next four years of design the requirements changed several times, adding an amphibious capability, as well as another version as a replacement for the Universal Carrier in the battlefield cargo role. When the requirements were finally stabilized as the XA-20 in 1956, a prototype contract was offered to Leyland Motors (Canada) under Project 97.

While the prototype was being built, Leyland Motors was purchased by Canadian Car and Foundry (CCF). A mockup was produced and sent to the Canadian Armour School at Camp Borden, and a number improvements were suggested. While this process continued, CCF itself was purchased by the ever-growing Avro Canada. Work continued on the design, and the first mild steel prototype was delivered in the APC layout, followed by two additional prototypes, another APC version, and a self-propelled artillery version intended to mount the 105 mm M101 howitzer, although this was not fitted.

Testing was relatively positive, and in 1959 the Ministry eventually secured an order for 500 of the APC version. However in 1960 the defense budget was slashed, and it was not until February 1961 that the Cabinet finally approved the budget. By this point the Bobcat had been in development for nine years, and no replacement for the Kangaroos or Universal Carriers had been purchased in the meantime. There was some discussion of modifying remaining Shermans and Universals for the interim, but this was dropped.

In 1962 Avro dissolved CCF, and moved production of the Bobcat to their aircraft plants in Malton, Ontario, which were underused since the cancellation of the Avro Arrow in 1959. A prototype of the complete production version started testing in February 1963, and by June it had completed 75% of its 2,000 mile qualification test run. However, the test report on the Bobcat was extremely negative. Pointing out a variety of problems, from tripping hazards in the cargo area to the extremely loud operating sounds, the report concluded that the vehicle was in need of additional development. Further confusing issues, in 1963 Avro itself was dissolved and rolled into its parent operating company, Hawker Siddeley Canada. In July the company met with the Ministry again to work out a program to fix the remaining problems, but neither side was willing to invest any more of their own money.

Given that no immediate solution seemed in sight, in November 1963 the Chief of the General Staff requested that the Bobcat project be terminated and the US M113 purchased in its place. Although the Bobcat had a number of advantages in comparison to the M113, notably in terms of size and its amphibious ability, the M113 by this point had entered service around the world and its huge production numbers led to a very low unit cost. Final cost for the Bobcat program was CDN$9.25 million. All that remains of the project is the qualification prototype at the Base Borden Military Museum.

== Description ==
The Bobcat was a relatively typical post-war APC design, with the engine located at the front, infantry area with rear-exit doors at the back, and a crew of two between the two sections.

In the case of the Bobcat, the engine was located behind a large access door mounted in an almost vertical glacis that was tilted slightly forward, giving the front of the vehicle a slab appearance. The glacis ended just below the top of the vehicle, where it met a sharply sloped deck angled back towards the top of the vehicle. The two operators, driver and commander/gunner, were housed under hemispherical cupolas with a ring of vision blocks offering relatively good all-round vision except to the rear, where the infantry area was raised and blocked the view. The front half of the cupola could be flipped up and back, opening to allow the seats to be raised for heads-out operation when not "buttoned up".

Overall the design was smaller than the M113, and considerably less "boxy", more in keeping with contemporary European designs like the FV432. The small size meant there was no room for a transverse transmission in the front of the vehicle, so a rear-drive was used with a drive shaft and transaxle housed under the cargo section. These required boxy protrusions into the cargo area, and the transaxle in particular, mounted just in front of the doors, was a major tripping hazard. Additionally, the drive shaft was extremely noisy in operation.
