= SM UC-74 =

German minelaying submarine

History

German Empire
- Name: UC-74
- Ordered: 12 January 1916
- Builder: AG Vulcan, Hamburg
- Yard number: 79
- Launched: 19 October 1916
- Commissioned: 26 November 1916
- Fate: Interned at Barcelona, 21 November 1918; surrendered to France, March 1919; broken up in Toulon, July 1921

General characteristics
- Class & type: Type UC II submarine
- Displacement: 410 t (400 long tons), surfaced; 493 t (485 long tons), submerged
- Length: 50.45 m (165 ft 6 in) o/a; 40.30 m (132 ft 3 in) pressure hull
- Beam: 5.22 m (17 ft 2 in) o/a; 3.65 m (12 ft) pressure hull
- Draught: 3.65 m (12 ft)
- Propulsion: 2 × propeller shafts; 2 × 6-cylinder, 4-stroke diesel engines, 580–600 PS (430–440 kW; 570–590 shp); 2 × electric motors, 620 PS (460 kW; 610 shp)
- Speed: 11.8 knots (21.9 km/h; 13.6 mph), surfaced; 7.3 knots (13.5 km/h; 8.4 mph), submerged
- Range: 8,660–10,230 nmi (16,040–18,950 km; 9,970–11,770 mi) at 7 knots (13 km/h; 8.1 mph) surfaced; 52 nmi (96 km; 60 mi) at 4 knots (7.4 km/h; 4.6 mph) submerged
- Test depth: 50 m (160 ft)
- Complement: 26
- Armament: 6 × 100 cm (39.4 in) mine tubes; 18 × UC 200 mines; 3 × 50 cm (19.7 in) torpedo tubes (2 bow/external; one stern); 7 × torpedoes; 1 × 8.8 cm (3.5 in) Uk L/30 deck gun
- Notes: 30-second diving time

Service record
- Part of: Pola / Mittelmeer / Mittelmeer II Flotilla; 17 March 1917 – 11 November 1918
- Commanders: Kptlt. Wilhelm Marschall; 26 November 1916 – 6 December 1917; Oblt.z.S. Hans Adalbert von der Lühe; 15 February – 6 August 1918; Oblt.z.S. Hans Schüler; 7 August – 21 November 1918
- Operations: 10 patrols
- Victories: 35 merchant ships sunk (92,265 GRT); 2 auxiliary warships sunk (457 GRT); 4 merchant ships damaged (13,108 GRT)

SM UC-74 (Note: "SM" stands for "Seiner Majestät" (English: His Majesty's) and combined with the U for Unterseeboot would be translated as His Majesty's Submarine.) was a German Type UC II minelaying submarine or U-boat in the German Imperial Navy (German: Kaiserliche Marine) during World War I. The U-boat was ordered on 12 January 1916 and was launched on 19 October 1916. She was commissioned into the German Imperial Navy on 26 November 1916 as SM UC-74. In ten patrols UC-74 was credited with sinking 37 ships, either by torpedo or by mines laid. UC-74 was interned at Barcelona on 21 November 1918 when she ran out of fuel. The U-boat was surrendered to France on 26 March 1919 and was broken up at Toulon in July 1921.

== Design ==
A Type UC II submarine, UC-74 had a displacement of 410 tonnes (400 long tons) when at the surface and 493 tonnes (485 long tons) while submerged. She had a length overall of 50.45 m (165 ft 6 in), a beam of 5.22 m (17 ft 2 in), and a draught of 3.65 m (12 ft). The submarine was powered by two six-cylinder four-stroke diesel engines each producing 290–300 metric horsepower (210–220 kW; 290–300 shp) (a total of 580–600 metric horsepower (430–440 kW; 570–590 shp)), two electric motors producing 620 metric horsepower (460 kW; 610 shp), and two propeller shafts. She had a dive time of 30 seconds and was capable of operating at a depth of 50 metres (160 ft).

The submarine had a maximum surface speed of 11.8 knots (21.9 km/h; 13.6 mph) and a submerged speed of 7.3 knots (13.5 km/h; 8.4 mph). When submerged, she could operate for 52 nautical miles (96 km; 60 mi) at 4 knots (7.4 km/h; 4.6 mph); when surfaced, she could travel 8,660 to 10,230 nautical miles (16,040 to 18,950 km; 9,970 to 11,770 mi) at 7 knots (13 km/h; 8.1 mph). UC-74 was fitted with six 100 centimetres (39 in) mine tubes, eighteen UC 200 mines, three 50 centimetres (20 in) torpedo tubes (one on the stern and two on the bow), seven torpedoes, and one 8.8 cm (3.5 in) Uk L/30 deck gun. Her complement was twenty-six crew members.

== Summary of raiding history ==
Date	Name	Nationality	Tonnage (Note: Tonnages are in gross register tons)	Fate
1 March 1917	Durban	Norway	765	Damaged
8 March 1917	Ares	Netherlands	3,783	Sunk
10 March 1917	James Burton Cook	United Kingdom	133	Sunk
15 April 1917	Arcadian	United Kingdom	8,939	Sunk
28 April 1917	Pontiac	United Kingdom	3,345	Sunk
2 May 1917	Alessandria	Kingdom of Italy	8,006	Sunk
29 May 1917	Aghia Ton Aghion	Greece	30	Sunk
29 May 1917	Kirikos	Greece	84	Sunk
29 May 1917	Yarra	France	4,163	Sunk
10 June 1917	Stylianos	Egypt	389	Sunk
11 June 1917	Benha	United Kingdom	1,878	Sunk
19 August 1917	Aghios Georgios	Greece	161	Sunk
24 August 1917	Parana	France	6,248	Sunk
30 August 1917	Athinai	Greece	988	Sunk
31 August 1917	Eleni	Greece	679	Sunk
1 September 1917	Amiral Olry	France	5,567	Sunk
3 September 1917	Agios Andreas	Greece	68	Sunk
6 September 1917	Ville De Strasbourg	France	2,167	Sunk
6 September 1917	Aghios Georgios	Greece	897	Sunk
30 September 1917	HMT Charlsin	Royal Navy	241	Sunk
6 October 1917	Civilian	United Kingdom	7,871	Sunk
11 October 1917	Panormitis	France	59	Sunk
14 October 1917	Semantha	United Kingdom	2,847	Sunk
15 October 1917	White Head	United Kingdom	1,172	Sunk
14 November 1917	Prophet	United Kingdom	3,230	Sunk
25 November 1917	Ovid	United Kingdom	4,159	Sunk
28 November 1917	Jane Radcliffe	United Kingdom	4,074	Sunk
4 March 1918	Clan Graham	United Kingdom	5,213	Damaged
5 March 1918	Roxburgh	United Kingdom	4,630	Sunk
10 March 1918	Chagres	United Kingdom	5,288	Sunk
30 April 1918	Kalliope	United Kingdom	114	Sunk
1 May 1918	Nikolaos	Greece	50	Sunk
5 May 1918	Sayeda	Egypt	18	Sunk
13 May 1918	HMT Loch Naver	Royal Navy	216	Sunk
11 July 1918	Roberto	Spain	910	Sunk
26 July 1918	Monastir	France	1,915	Damaged
23 October 1918	Aghios Gerasimos	Greece	85	Sunk
2 November 1918	Murcia	United Kingdom	4,871	Sunk
2 November 1918	Surada	United Kingdom	5,324	Sunk
4 November 1918	War Roach	United Kingdom	5,215	Damaged
5 November 1918	Stavnos	Kingdom of Italy	38	Sunk
