= Canadian Car and Foundry FDB-1 =

Canadian biplane fighter-bomber prototype

Gregor FDB-1
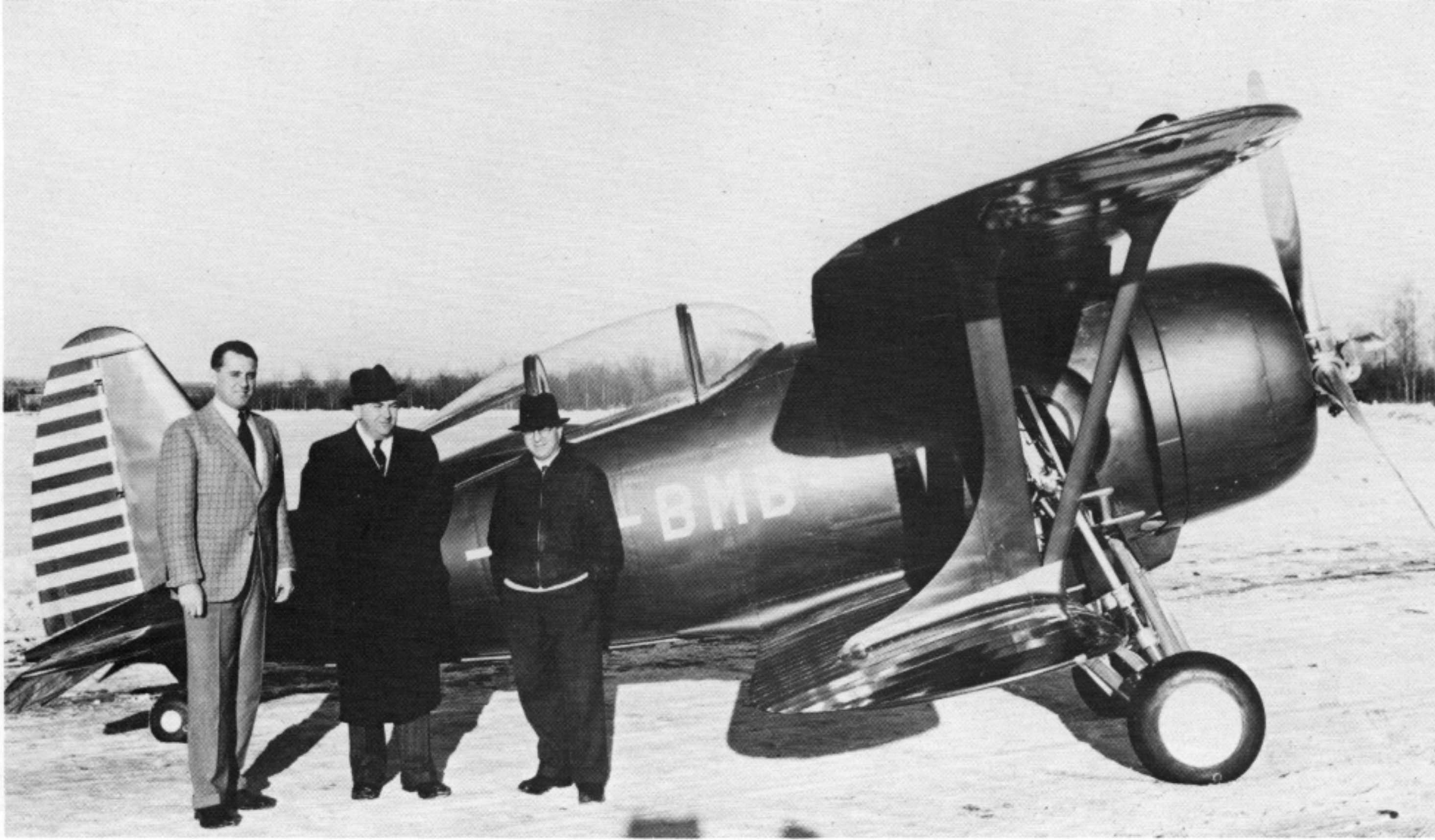
- L-R: Test Pilot George Ayde, Can-Car rep David Boyd and designer Michael Gregor

General information
- Type: Fighter-Bomber
- Manufacturer: Canadian Car and Foundry
- Designer: Michael Gregor
- Status: Abandoned
- Number built: 1

History
- First flight: 17 December 1938

The Gregor FDB-1 was a Canadian biplane fighter, designed in 1938 by Michael Gregor and manufactured by Canadian Car and Foundry. Despite having some advanced design features such as flush rivetted all-metal construction and a retractable undercarriage, the final generation of biplane fighters was being supplanted by monoplanes and the Gregor FDB-1 was obsolete before it flew. Despite the Royal Canadian Air Force's desperation for modern fighters, the sole example remained unsold and was eventually lost in a fire in 1945. The Gregor FDB-1's model designation stood for Fighter Dive Bomber indicating its intended roles.

== Design ==
In 1938, Georgian expatriate designer Mikheil Grigorashvili (anglicized as Michael Gregor) joined with Canadian Car and Foundry, which at that time was Canada's leading manufacturer of railroad rolling stock. He was hired to design a fighter. They wanted to enter the aircraft market, but had no experience in that industry. Instead of creating their own designs, Can-Car was producing aircraft under license that had been designed elsewhere. In 1936, Grumman and Canadian Car & Foundry or "Can-Car" concluded an agreement for production of 50 Grumman SF-1 biplane carrier fighters known as GE-23s or Grumman Export 23s, to be built in Canada. There were still some who doubted the merits of the monoplane over the biplane in 1938, and Michael Gregor was one of them. All the major powers still operated biplanes in front line fighter units, however they were being replaced with monoplanes in every case.

The hydraulically operated landing gear retracted into wells on the sides of the fuselage ahead of the lower wing. The fuselage of the Model 10 FDB-I was a monocoque shell of circular cross section with a flush-riveted aluminum stressed-skin. 95 US gallons (360 litres; 79 imperial gallons) of fuel was carried in a pair of semicircular tanks mounted side-by-side between the wheel wells. The structure was stressed 60 percent above requirements. A pair of fuselage-mounted .50 cal. machine guns, synchronized to fire through the Hamilton Standard propeller's disk, were part of the design, but the armament was never installed. Additionally, two 116 lb (53 kg) bombs could be carried, one under each lower wing. The cockpit was enclosed with a rearward sliding canopy and the engine was faired in with a NACA cowling reminiscent of the Seversky monoplane fighters that Gregor had worked on. Among the new devices incorporated in the FDB-1 was an anti-spin parachute in the tailcone. The pilot activated it from the cockpit with a switch that opened the cone, deployed the chute and released the connecting cable.

The metal wing structure was fabric covered behind the front spar as were the metal-framed control surfaces. The top wing featured full span slats, plus all-metal split flaps between the wing roots and ailerons. The bottom wing also incorporated split flaps. The center section of the top wing curved down to meet the fuselage, in a gull-wing configuration like earlier Polish and Soviet fighters such as the Polikarpov I-153. The wings were braced with "V" interplane struts. Instead of flying and landing wires, a single strut ran between the root of the top wing and the foot of the V strut on the lower wing on each side. Torque tubes moved the control surfaces, except for the rudder, which was partially operated by cables.

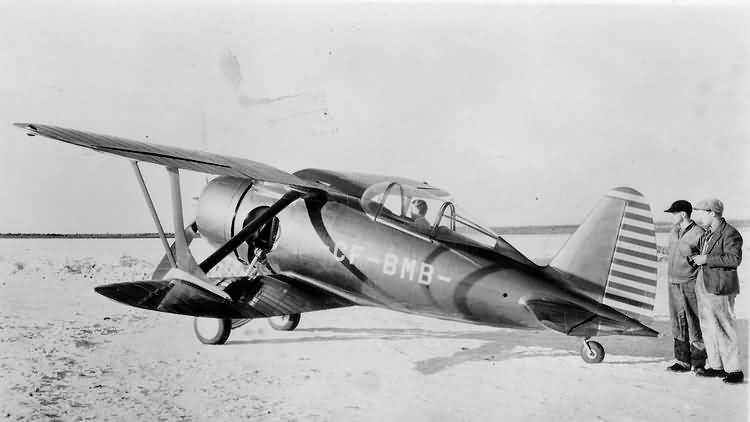
Gregor FDB-1 being tested, December 1938.

== Development ==
A wood wind tunnel model was sent to Hawker Aircraft in England for testing early in 1938, and construction of the prototype began in Thunder Bay shortly thereafter, with it completed in December 1938, "amid an atmosphere of war jitters, well salted with tales of German spies visiting the factory in disguise." When rolled out, the FDB-1 c/n 201 was registered CF-BMB, with the letters and ten horizontal rudder stripes in white over a dark gloss metallic gray.

Can-Car test pilot George Adye carried out its first test flight on 17 December 1938, from Can-Car's Bishopfield Airport. He noted the gull-wing severely restricted downward and forward visibility. Another test pilot succinctly described it as being "blind as hell." While enthusiastic over its manoeuvrability, the controls were overly sensitive and the flaps lowered too far. On a subsequent landing, the prototype was flipped on its back, although damage was minimal.

RCAF testers achieved a top speed of 261 mph (420 km/h) at 13,100 ft (4,000 m), with the same 700 hp (520 kW) Pratt & Whitney R-1535-72 engine used by the Grumman F3F-1 to attain 231 mph (372 km/h). However, this was without military equipment such as guns, ammunition or armour, and was much lower than Canadian Car and Foundry's claims. Top speed was anticipated to reach 300 mph (480 km/h) with a 750 hp (560 kW) Pratt & Whitney R-1535-SB4-G, however installation of military equipment would have more than eliminated any gains. At the time of testing Gregor was redesigning it to accept the 1,200 hp (890 kW) Pratt & Whitney R-1830 Twin Wasp which he hoped would raise the top speed.

Designed, built and flown in under eight months, the FDB-1 Model 10 was sent to the Royal Canadian Air Force for testing. Severe canopy vibrations were experienced at speed or during aerobatics, and testing was restricted until this was remedied. Further tests showed that Gregor's claims were overly optimistic and the RCAF doubted further refinements would make any difference. As can be expected from a biplane without the weight of 8 machine guns, or armour to slow it down, the FDB-1 demonstrated amazing manoeuvrability and despite a speed advantage, the RCAF's Hawker Hurricane Mk.I monoplanes were unable to turn with it below 15,000 ft (4,600 m).

Contemporary "cigarette" card illustration of the Gregor FDB-1

== Disposition ==
Can-Car entered it in the January 1940 New York-to-Miami air race in a final effort to generate interest but shortly after takeoff oil pressure was lost, forced the FDB-1 to land, disqualifying it. During testing two months later its landing gear collapsed. Although Mexican authorities were interested and a registration was reserved, the Canadian government refused an export license and there were no other prospective customers.

Gregor claimed: "They'll start this war with monoplanes, but they'll finish it with biplanes." Neither his prediction nor his aircraft survived the war. After several years in storage, the FDB-1 was destroyed in a Cartierville Airport hangar fire.

== Specifications: Gregor FDB-1 ==
Aviation in Canada.

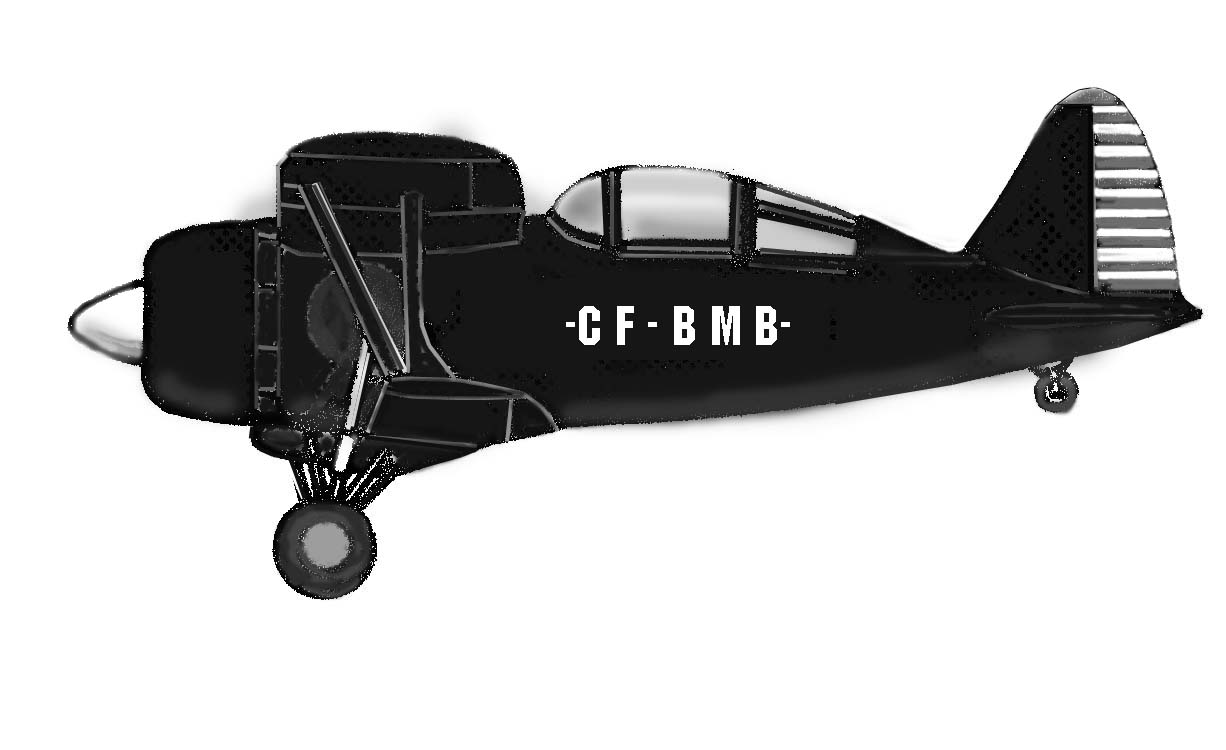
FDB-1 profile illustration

General characteristics

- Crew: One
- Length: 21 ft 8 in (6.60 m)
- Wingspan: 28 ft (8.5 m)
- Height: 9 ft 4.5 in (2.858 m)
- Wing area: 329 sq ft (30.6 m^{2})
- Empty weight: 2,880 lb (1,306 kg)
- Gross weight: 4,100 lb (1,860 kg)
- Powerplant: 1 × Pratt & Whitney R-1535-72 14-cylinder air-cooled radial engine, 700 hp (520 kW)
- Propellers: 3-bladed

Performance

- Maximum speed: 261 mph (420 km/h, 227 kn) at 13,100 ft (4,000 m) unarmed
- Cruise speed: 205 mph (330 km/h, 178 kn)
- Stall speed: 72 mph (116 km/h, 63 kn) clean, and 58 mph (93 km/h; 50 kn) with flaps and slats down
- Range: 985 mi (1,585 km, 856 nmi)
- Service ceiling: 27,700 ft (8,400 m) RCAF figures
- Rate of climb: 2,800 ft/min (14 m/s) at sea level, unarmed, RCAF figures

Armament

- Guns: 2 × 12.7 mm (0.50 in) machine guns
- Bombs: 2 x 116 lb (53 kg) bombs under wings

== See also ==
Aircraft of comparable role, configuration, and era

- Blériot-SPAD S.510 (last French biplane fighter)
- Fiat CR.42 Falco (Last Italian biplane fighter)
- Gloster Gladiator (Last British biplane fighter)
- Grumman F3F (last American biplane fighter)
- Arado Ar 68 (Last German biplane fighter)
- Kawasaki Ki-10 (last Japanese biplane fighter)
- Polikarpov I-153 (Last Soviet biplane fighter)
