= Décarie =

Décarie or Decarie is a surname. Notable people with the surname include:

- Ed Decarie, Canadian ice hockey player
- Daniel-Jérémie Décarie (1836–1904), Canadian politician
- Jérémie-Louis Décarie (1870–1927), Canadian lawyer, politician, and judge in the province of Quebec
- Richard Décarie, Canadian Strategy Communication Consultant
- Vianney Décarie (1917–2009), Canadian philosopher

== See also ==
- Décarie Autoroute, the section of Quebec Autoroute 15 between Turcot Interchange and Décarie Interchange on the Island of Montreal
- Décarie Interchange, an expressway interchange on the Island of Montreal
