= Dominion Car and Foundry =

Dominion Car and Foundry was a railcar maker based in Montreal and later merged to form Canadian Car and Foundry in 1909.

DCF's history dates back before the company's formal incorporation in 1906. In 1902 Simplex Railway and Appliance Company of Hammond, Indiana established a factory in St. Henri district of Montreal to manufacturer Simplex car bolsters and Susemihl roller side bearings for use on Canadian railway cars.

Formally established in 1906 as Dominion Steel Car Company, it later changed the name to Dominion Car and Foundry. DCF was essentially an American branch plant linked to Simplex and the American Steel Foundries Company.

== Clients ==
- D&H - subsidiary of Quebec, Montreal and Southern
- Canadian Pacific Railway
- Winnipeg Electric Railway Company
- Montreal Street Railway

== Products ==
- standard box cars
- steel box cars
- double wood sheathed box cars
- streetcars
- electric dump cars

== See also ==
- Canadian Car and Foundry
- Canada Car Company
