= Turcot Interchange =

Interchange in Montreal, Quebec

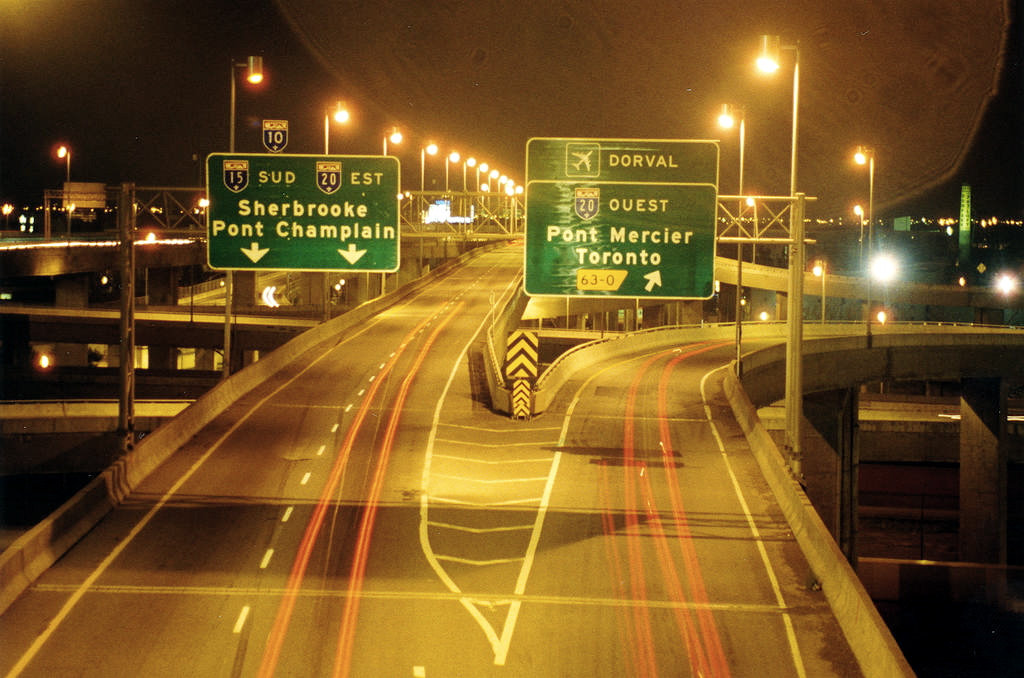
- Approaching the Turcot Interchange from southbound A-15
- Interactive map of Turcot Interchange

Location
- Montreal, Quebec
- Coordinates: 45.467776°N 73.599472°W
- Roads at junction: A-15 (Autoroute Décarie); A-20 (Autoroute du Souvenir); R-136 (Autoroute Ville-Marie)

Construction
- Type: Stack interchange
- Constructed: 1965 – 1967; 2008 – 2020
- Opened: April 1967

The Turcot Interchange is a three-level four-way freeway interchange within the city of Montreal, Quebec, Canada. Located southwest of downtown, the interchange links Autoroutes 15 (Décarie and Décarie South Expressways) and 20 (Remembrance Highway), and Route 136 (Ville-Marie Expressway), and provides access to the Champlain Bridge via the Décarie South Expressway. It takes its name from the nearby Philippe-Turcot Street and Turcot village, which were in turn named after Philippe Turcot (1791–1861) who was a merchant owning land in Saint-Henri.

Turcot is the largest interchange in the province and, as of 2010, the third busiest in Montreal—after the Décarie and Anjou interchanges—handling an average daily traffic flow of approximately 278,000 vehicles north–southbound and over 350,000 vehicles in total west–eastbound. Additionally, Turcot is occasionally the site of road accidents, as the speed limit is set at 70 km/h (43 mph) in all directions but is frequently exceeded by nighttime drivers who often travel over 100 km/h (62 mph).

The interchange underwent an extensive reconstruction commencing in 2015 which was completed by fall 2020. The $3.7-billion project is the largest roadwork in the province's history.

== History ==
The interchange was conceived in 1958 as part of Montreal’s first highway and was planned to connect it to the Décarie Expressway, which was designed concurrently. Construction started in October 1965 and Turcot was built in time for the 1967 Montreal Expo, along with other big projects such as the Montreal Metro.

Upon its erection, an old railroad yard belonging to the Grand Trunk Company (today merged into Canadian National) served as location for the interchange and was shortened by 25%, which required the demolition of a roundhouse. In 1969, upon reviewing the situation, city authorities concluded that the project used unnecessary space and could have co-existed perfectly alongside the buildings that were otherwise demolished, including some 20 residences.

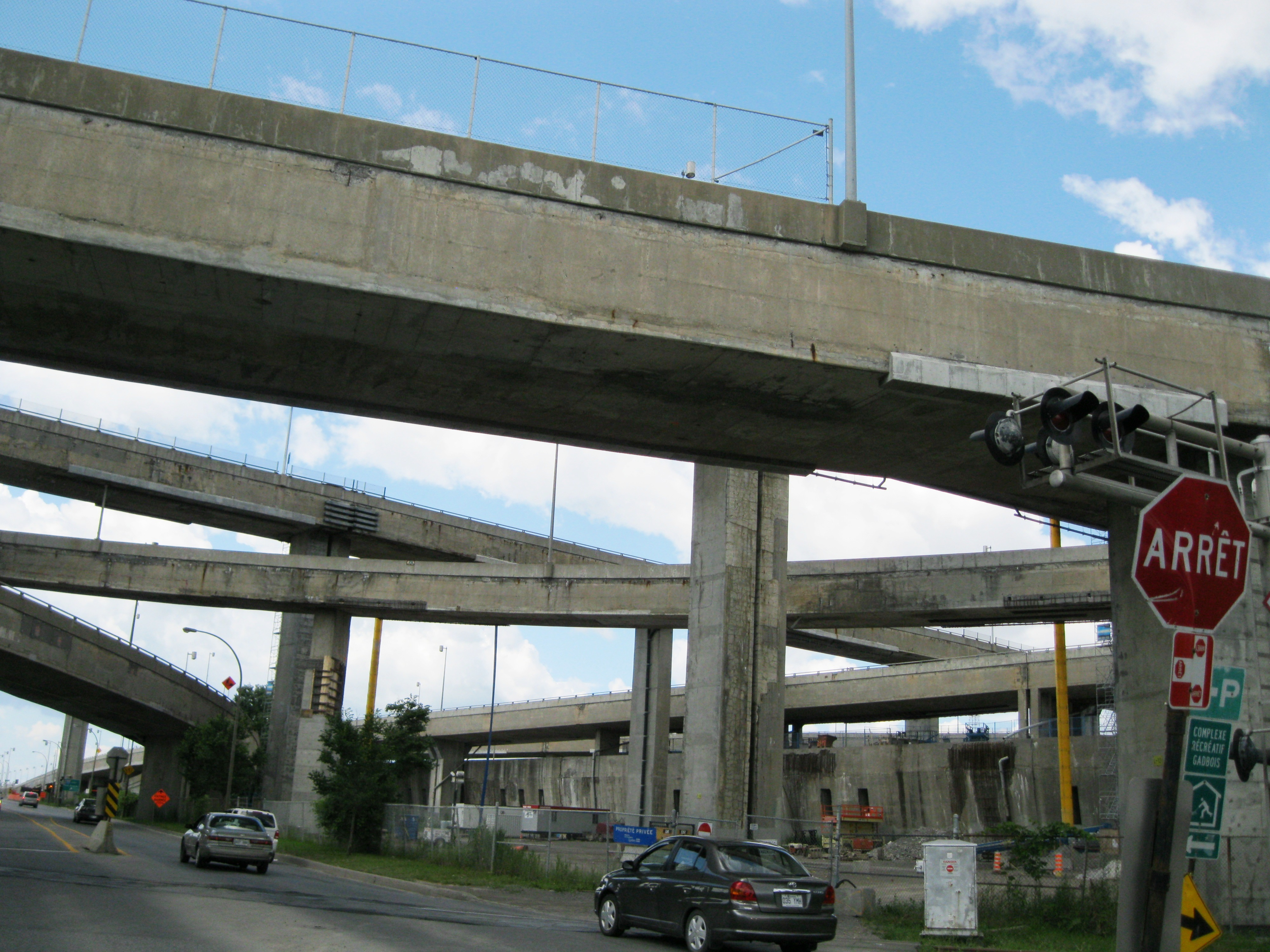
The elevated lanes of the old Turcot Interchange

When originally constructed, nearly the entire interchange was built elevated above ground level due to the cliff separating the Upper Lachine area from the Turcot sorting yard, which occupied the former basin of Saint-Pierre Lake. The highest point of the interchange (62.5 metres or 205 feet) is located in its southern part over the Lachine Canal to allow for the passing of ships, but the canal closed its waterway operations just three years later, in 1970. The mean height of the interchange is around 40 metres (130 ft), which was, at the time of its inauguration, both the highest freeway interchange in all of Canada and a dramatic demonstration of Montreal's status as a modern global metropolis at the time. However, the construction of the junction was rushed during the 1960s boom, plus the structures were not designed to cope with Montreal's winters with their heavy snowfall as they lacked drainage and consisted of permeable concrete.

By 2000, more than 300,000 vehicles used the interchange daily—far exceeding the 50,000 to 60,000 vehicles it was originally designed to accommodate. The heavy traffic, combined with harsh winter conditions, road salt, and inadequate drainage, caused the permeable concrete of the flyovers to deteriorate more quickly than expected. There were reports of concrete slabs—measuring up to one square metre (or square yard)—falling from the overpasses. Despite upcoming plans for reconfiguration of the interchange since 2010, there have been major repairs to the heavily-traveled ramps originally slated to be demolished. During the summer of 2011, over 2.7 km (1¾ miles) worth of lanes were restored, repaved, and returned to safely accessible condition for larger vehicles.

== Reconstruction ==
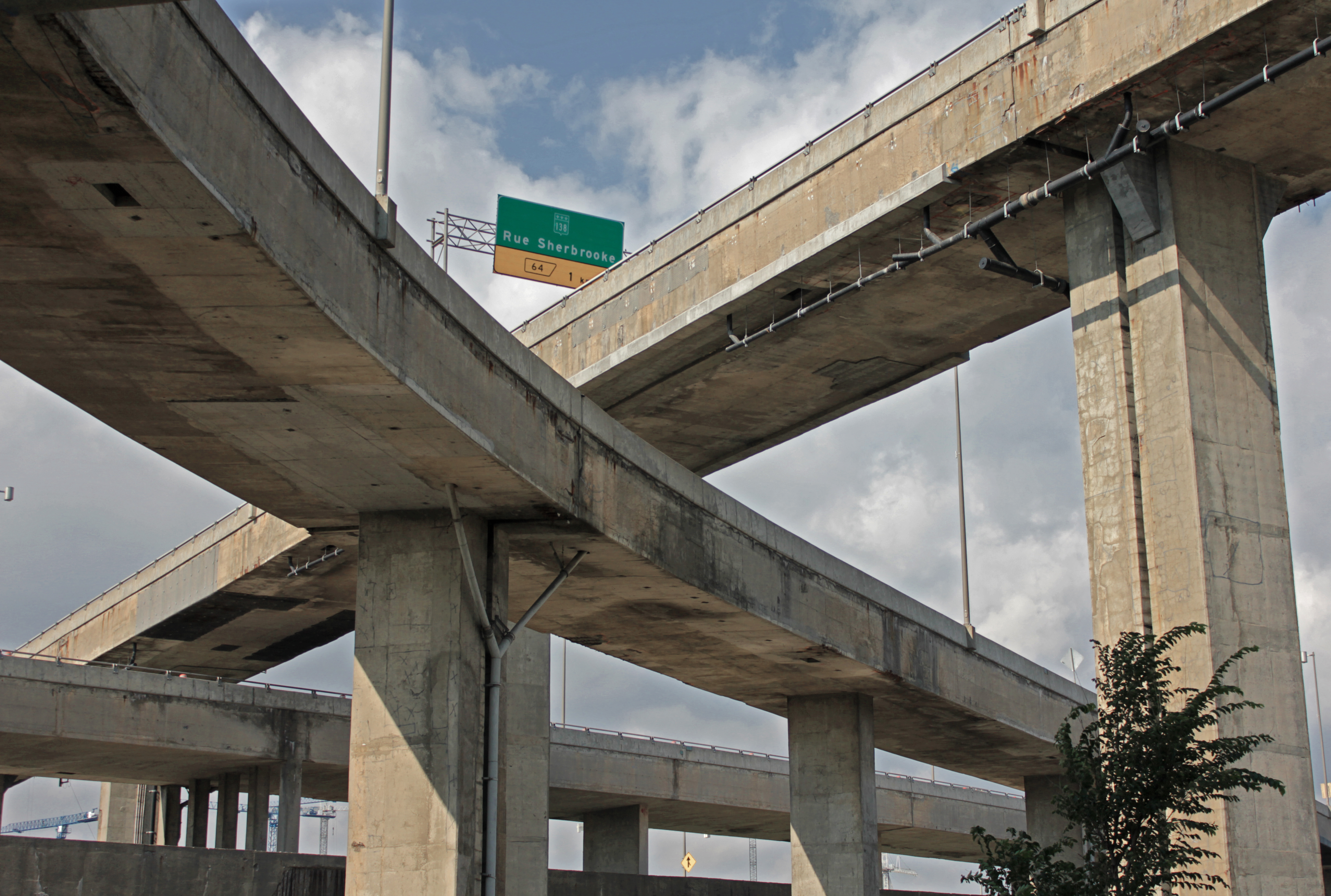
Underside of the various flyovers comprising the original Turcot Interchange.

In June 2007, the Quebec government announced plans to demolish and reconstruct the Turcot Interchange with the new flyovers built lower to the ground, with completion initially projected for 2016. Reconstruction of the interchange was expected to cost between $1.2 billion and $1.5 billion.

As part of the reconfiguration of the Turcot Interchange, that segment of Autoroute 20 approaching the interchange would be shifted north and rebuilt with the carriageways "unreversed" to follow conventional right-hand drive. Since 1967, between Route 138 and the existing Turcot Interchange, the carriageways of Autoroute 20 were "reversed" with the central median on the left-hand side, rather than on the right-hand side like the rest of the province and country.

=== Controversy ===
At the time of its announcement, the project sparked controversy over how the Turcot Interchange should be rebuilt. Local residents and community groups opposed the government’s proposed plan, arguing that it would worsen pollution, increase automobile traffic in the downtown area, and require the demolition of housing—including a significant portion of the Village des Tanneries neighborhood.

The project's environmental hearings ended on June 19, 2009. They revealed new plans for the area by CN, as well as strong public desire to protect existing communities, rethink the model balance of Montreal's urban transportation, and plan realistically for a future of energy shortages and environmental crisis.

After MDDEP conducted several environmental and technical impact investigations in early summer of 2009, construction plans were halted because of the 2008 financial crisis.

=== Second project ===
In April 2010, the city of Montreal gathered all previous commentary reviewed by BAPE and announced a different reconstruction project in which the railroad tracks and the main body of the A-20 are kept at their original location, the height of the interchange is maintained but replaced with better-lasting materials, and the former Turcot Yards serve as ground for a new urban redevelopment district with its own community aspect. The cost as set at least $5 billion, which is at least three times that of the original.

"If this project is to replace the original," stated Julie Boulet, "we can expect at least two more years of stalling," and suggested that Turcot should not be seen as a sandbox for any kind of proposals coming from all levels of the government. According to Gerald Tremblay, former mayor of Montreal, that was exactly the time necessary to prepare for the works, which were postponed into the second half of 2012.

=== Groundbreaking and Angrignon exit reconfiguration ===
Starting February 2012, the Quebec Ministry of Transport (MTQ) proceeded to hire excavation companies in order to start the ground leveling of the former yards in terms of the future project. The westbound lanes of the A-20 were to be moved to that location, and Boulet confirmed that the reconfiguration of the Ste-Anne-de-Bellevue—Pullman—Angrignon interchange would take place and that it was scheduled to be completed in 2018. Just as foreseen in the project, the part of the Angrignon Boulevard used as an exit overpass from the A-20 will be moved some 300 metres (330 yards) westward, forming the second half of the Sainte-Anne-de-Bellevue Boulevard intersection. The original part of Pullman Street, between Angrignon and Sainte-Anne, simply ceased to exist. As of April 2014, the works could be seen to be underway near the interchange itself, and some existing streets/exits/entrances (Girouard, Crowley (after the CUSM completion), Côte-Saint-Paul, Angrignon/Pullman) had been reconfigured to accept the new flow once the body of the A-20 was moved northward.

=== Completion (2015–2020) ===
The reconfiguration and reconstruction of the interchange started in 2015 and was completed by fall 2020. The $3.7-billion project was the largest roadwork in the province's history. In October 2016, much of the old interchange was closed to allow continuous work. Most of the new structures were built next to or underneath the existing elevated road network, so once traffic was shifted to the new structures, the old elevated road structures were demolished. Critics claimed that the reconstruction was car-focused and did little to implement the promised improvements for local inhabitants.

== In popular culture ==
Famous Quebec folk singer Plume Latraverse, beacon of the late 1960s counterculture and key figure at the 1976 Montreal Olympics, compared Turcot to the "functional heart" of the city, with its inward ramps being the arteries and outward ramps being the veins in the lyrics of one of his late 1970s songs.

Turcot was the setting for writer-director René Balcer's 1978 short film Turcot Interchange, a dark rom-com.

Since late 1990s, the abandoned space underneath the ramps has become a place of urban gatherings for certain graffiti artists. The artistic trio "Flow", which was also rooted in Montreal in 1993 and has long ever since moved on, is involved in producing one of the paintings on the westbound A-20 ramp, "Smashing All Toys." With criminal activity on the rise in Saint-Henri in the first half of the 2000s, this space has also been high on drug dealers and violence gangs until they were cleared by the SPVM by 2010.

== See also ==
- Grade separation
- Spaghetti Junction
- Freeway
