= Jock Turcot =

Canadian student leader (1943–1965)

Francis James "Jock" Turcot (5 October 1943 – 25 December 1965) was President of the Student Federation of the University of Ottawa (then known as the Students' Union of the University of Ottawa) in 1965 and a leading figure of the Canadian student movement in the 1960s.

== Early life ==
Turcot was born on October 5, 1943, in Kenora. He was the eldest of 12 children.

== Early involvement at uOttawa ==
Fluent in English and French, he came to the University of Ottawa to study civil law. His first notable post within the SUUO was when he became Publications Commissioner in April 1964.

As Publications Commissioner, he also created a commission with the goal of creating a charter for both the student papers.

== Presidency of the SUUO ==
=== Campbell Crisis ===
In the 1960s, the relationship between the student government and the university was marked by a battle for autonomy on the part of the student government. The university often interfered in the SUUO's affairs and threatened several times to expel student leaders for their activism, while the faculty associations repeatedly threatened to separate from the SUUO and the SUUO struggled financially. In late 1964, those tensions climaxed when SUUO President Robert Campbell attacked the university, accusing it of ignoring students and wasting their time, and stating that the SUUO would do whatever it took to gain independence. The SUUO's Grand Council, however, used that letter as a pretext to impeach Campbell, at which point the rest of the SUUO exec resigned in solidarity with Campbell.

In the special election that followed, Turcot quickly emerged as the compromise candidate, seeing as he had not been particularly involved with any of the political factions on campus. On 17 January 1965, he was elected President of the SUUO for the remainder of the 1964-65 year.

=== Presidency ===
Upon becoming president, he soon released a long-term plan for the SUUO based on a Students' Charter, a study of the SUUO structure, a new SUUO Constitution, incorporation of the SUUO and the construction of a student centre for campus. He also quickly undertook consultations and meetings with all of the faculty associations on campus and began a practice of holding weekly press conferences to update students on SUUO affairs.

In March 1965, he was re-elected as president for the 1965–1966 term.

In November 1965, the SUUO led a march of over 800 students on Parliament Hill to demonstrate in favour of free tuition. As President, he also helped organise SUUO participation in the Royal Commission on Bilingualism and Biculturalism, highlighted the situation of international students on campus for the first time, lobbied for the introduction of a reading week in the winter semester, and oversaw the creation of a charter for the SUUO Student Court. He also helped formulate the SUUO's response to the Commission on the Financing of Higher Education in Canada led by Vincent Bladen, which rejected calls for free tuition.

== Involvement in the Canadian student movement ==
In November 1964, Turcot attended the founding meeting of the UGEQ, the new national students' union in Québec. One of his goals was to negotiate membership of the SUUO, given the SUUO's bilingual nature and the high proportion of francophone students at the University of Ottawa. He came back from the meeting concerned about the future of the UGEQ, saying that the union was too dogmatic and had chosen to be a union for Québecois and not for French-Canadian students. Turcot was also a supporter of Canadian federalism, which ran contrary to rising Québec nationalism.

At the September 1965 annual conference of the Canadian Union of Students held at Bishop's University, Turcot took a leading role in proposing new policy, and was consequently offered the position of CUS President. He declined the post, stating that he wanted to concentrate on SUUO affairs. At that conference, the CUS adopted a number of policies, including support for free tuition, lowering the voting age to 18 and abolishing the death penalty.

In 1965, Turcot also got the CUS to adopt his Declaration on the Canadian Student which called for students to form autonomous and democratic student governments, for students to have a greater say in university affairs and for students to take the lead in campaigning for social justice movements.

== Death and legacy ==
On Christmas Day 1965, Turcot died in a car accident while driving home to his family in St-Charles-de-Mandeville from the uOttawa campus. He had stayed on campus for the Christmas Eve supper for international students, and was only planning to have a short break, so that he could finish the new SUUO Constitution before the end of the Christmas holidays.

The university held a remembrance ceremony for him on 11 January in the Church du Sacré-Coeur on campus, and cancelled all classes during the ceremony to encourage students to attend.

The SUUO then created the Jock Turcot Memorial Fund to collect money for the construction of a student centre. In March 1966, students voted by a 2/3rds majority in favour of a $10 levy per student per year to go towards the construction of the student centre. The building opened in 1973, and was named after Turcot. His brother, Mark Turcot, was SFUO President when the student centre was opened.

The work he did on the structures of the SUUO had a major impact on the workings of the SUUO for decades, and the SUUO was incorporated a few years after his death (at which point it switched its name back to the SFUO). His advocacy at the national level of the Canadian student movement also had an impact for decades, as he was one of the first to gain recognition for wider social justice activism in the student movement, and the Turcot Declaration on the Canadian Student was a landmark document. The SFUO, however, failed to maintain a presence within the Québec student movement, which continued to build its own identity away from the student movement in the rest of Canada.

Jock Turcot did, however, face some criticism during his term as president. Notably, he was accused multiple times of being too close to the university administration and of having a weak and too conservative policy on incorporation. He was also sometimes accused of gaining support based on his good looks, and not based on merit.
