= French minesweepers Inkerman and Cerisoles =

Navarin-class minesweepers lost on Lake Superior

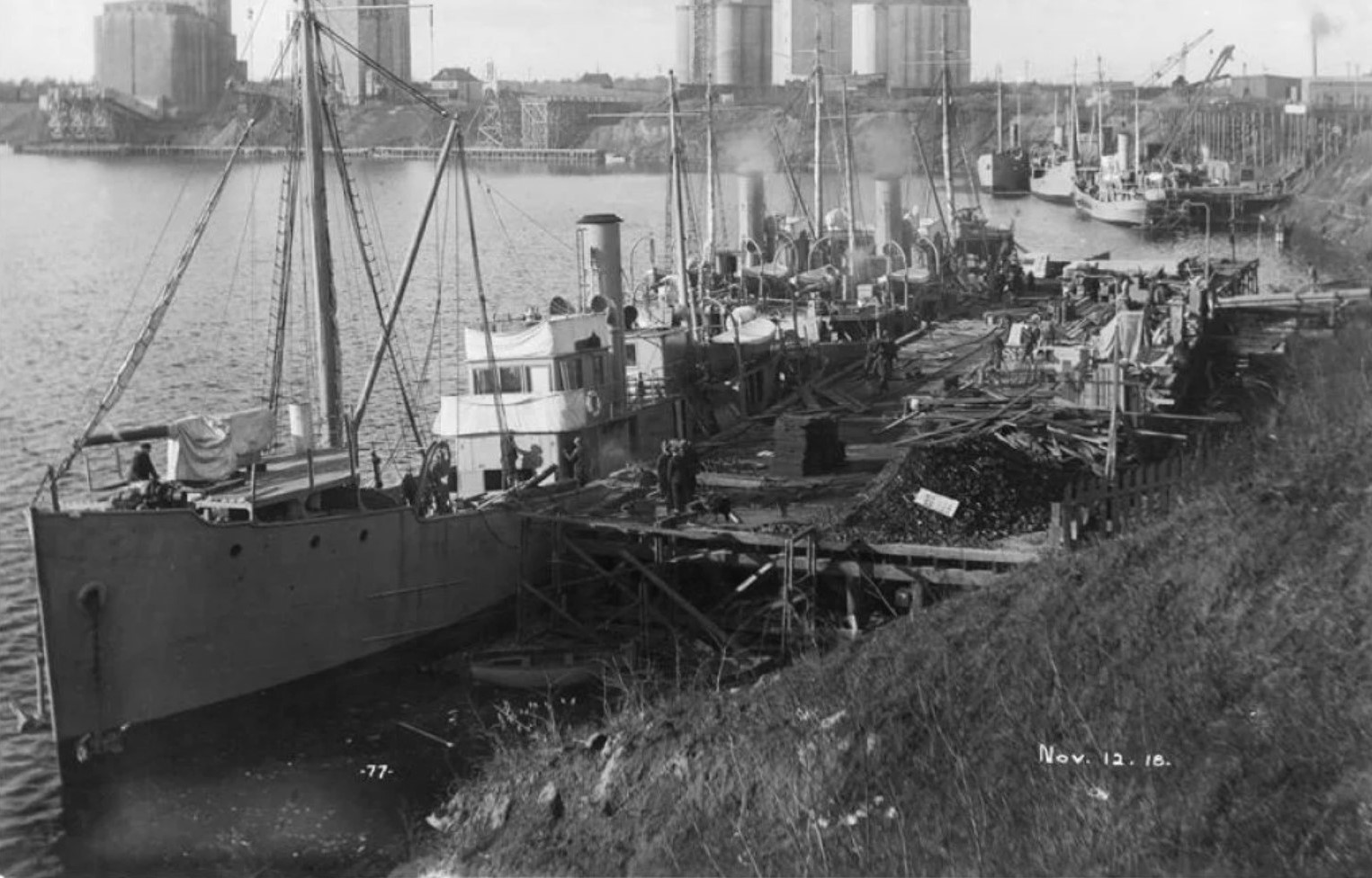
- Ships of the class under construction in 1918

History

France
- Name: Inkerman and Cerisoles
- Ordered: 1917
- Builder: Canadian Car and Foundry of Fort William, Ontario, Canada
- Laid down: 1918
- Launched: 1918
- Christened: 11 November 1918
- Maiden voyage: 23 November 1918
- Fate: Disappeared in a storm on 24 November 1918

General characteristics
- Class & type: Navarin-class minesweeper
- Length: 41.3 metres (135 ft)
- Beam: 6.9 metres (23 ft)

Inkerman and Cerisoles were two French minesweepers that vanished during their maiden voyage in a storm on Lake Superior on 24 November 1918. No trace of the two vessels has ever been found. The ships' crews, 76 French sailors and two Canadian captains, disappeared along with the minesweepers. Inkerman and Cerisoles are the last warships to disappear on the Great Lakes, and their sinkings caused the largest loss of life of any Lake Superior shipwreck.

== Background ==
Inkerman and Cerisoles were Navarin-class minesweepers, designed to clear naval mines along the coast of France and in the English Channel. They were named after major French military battles: the Battle of Inkerman was fought on 5 November 1854, during the Crimean War of 1853–1856, and the Battle of Cérisoles was fought on 11 April 1544, during the Italian War of 1542–1546. A sister ship named Sebastopol was built alongside Inkerman and Cerisoles.

A contract for $2.5 million awarded to Canadian Car and Foundry to construct 12 minesweepers for the French government was reported in February 1918. Built in what was then known as Fort William, Ontario, half of the order was completed by early November 1918. Each vessel was 135 feet (41 m) long and rated at 321 gross register tonnage. Their steel-framed wooden hulls were divided into four water-tight compartments. Each ship was fitted with twin screws and a single funnel, and had a top speed of about 12 knots (22 km/h; 14 mph). Two 100 mm (4 in) deck-mounted guns, with a range of about 20 kilometres (22,000 yd; 12 miles), were located forward and aft.

== Maiden voyage and loss ==
On 23 November 1918, the three minesweepers Inkerman, Cerisoles, and Sebastopol left the harbour of Fort William, Ontario, on the northern shore of Lake Superior, headed for the Atlantic Ocean via the Great Lakes and the St. Lawrence River. Captain M. Leclerc of the French Navy was in charge of the ships and was aboard the Sebastopol, while 76 French sailors made up the crews of Inkerman and Cerisoles with the addition of two veteran Canadian captains, Capt. R. Wilson and W. J. Murphy. As the ships steamed further into Lake Superior, they encountered a blizzard with recorded winds of 50 miles per hour (80 km/h) and waves 30 feet (9.1 m) high.

The ships soon lost sight of each other through the snow and waves. The storm was so bad that a sailor aboard Sebastopol said, "We had to get out the life boats and put on lifebelts ... the boat almost sank – and it was nearly 'goodbye' to anyone hearing from us again ... You can believe me, I will always remember that day. I can tell you that I had already given myself up to God." Water poured into Sebastopol, flooding part of her engine room and nearly putting out the coal fires in her boilers. The storm pounded Sebastopol for two days, but the vessel managed to reach Sault Ste. Marie at the eastern end of Lake Superior. It soon became apparent that Inkerman and Cerisoles were nowhere to be found.

== Searches ==
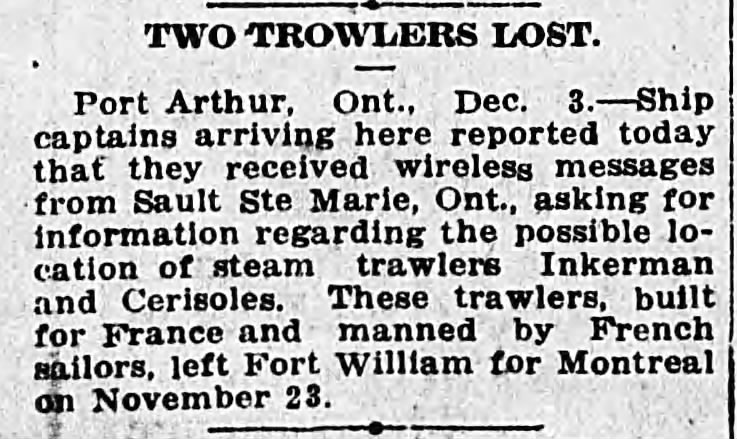
Newspaper headline of December 3, 1918

On 3 December 1918, 10 days after the three ships left Fort William, a search effort was launched. Also on 3 December, Canadian and American newspapers reported the ships were overdue. A week later, "last attempt" search efforts were reported. The search was abandoned by Captain Leclerc on the evening of 15 December. As Inkerman and Cerisoles were not found, and no wreckage has been found to date, (Note: While one source mentions "a yawl marked Cerisoles found on the desolate beach east of Grand Marais", this does not appear to have been reported contemporaneously and lacks corroboration.) their exact whereabouts and fates remain unknown.

Following the ships' disappearance, it was rumored that the ships were poorly built; it was also rumored that the crews became stranded on an island.

In 2017, an effort organized by the Great Lakes Shipwreck Museum searched for the ships' wreckage for over a month near the Keweenaw Peninsula.

A June 2023 episode of Expedition Unknown featured new efforts to locate wreckage of the two ships; neither was found, but the expedition did locate the June 14, 1879 shipwreck of the tugboat Satellite.
