= Navarin-class minesweeper =

Minesweeper class of the French Navy

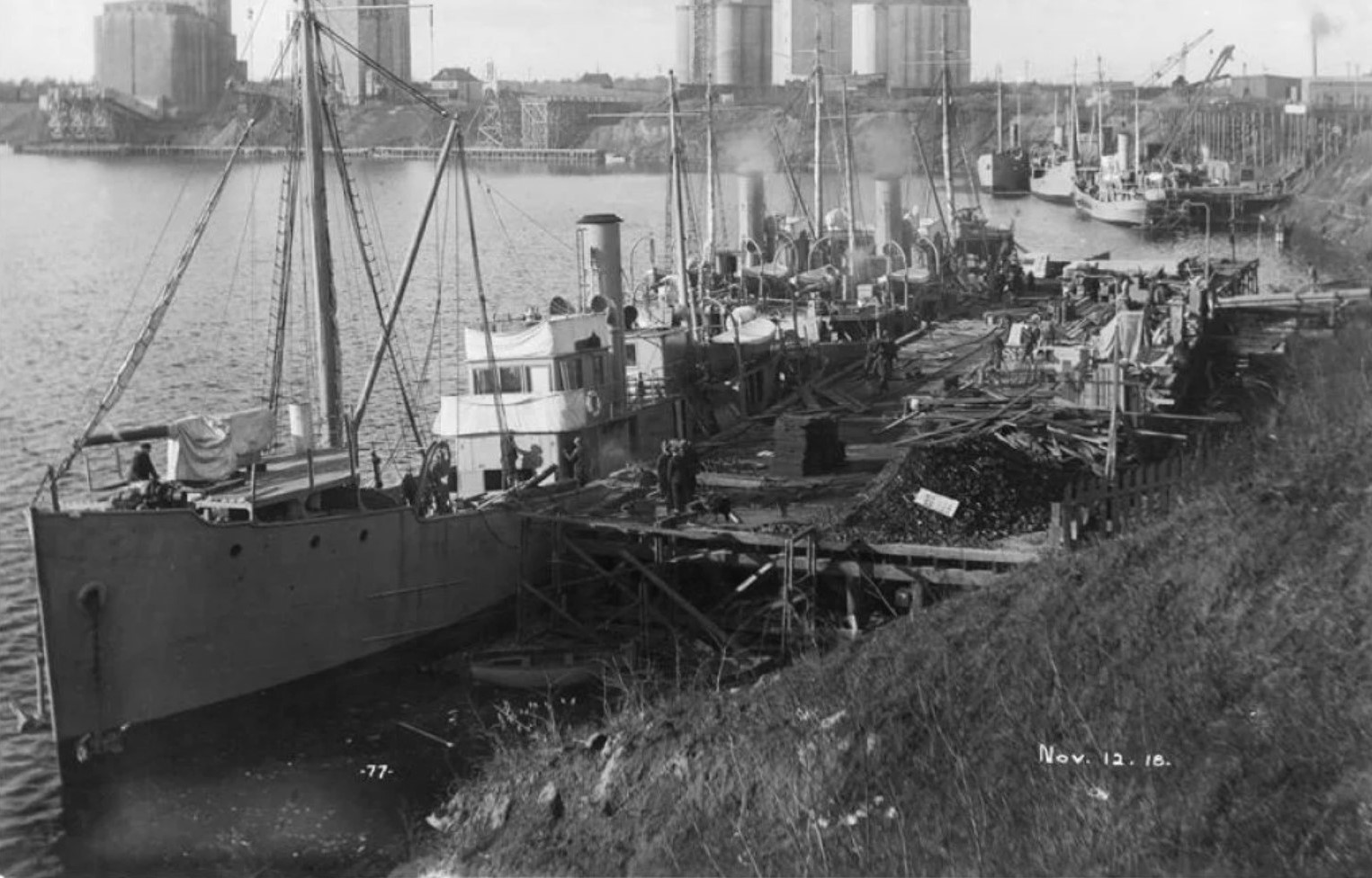
- Ships of the class under construction in 1918

Class overview
- Name: Navarin-class minesweeper
- Builders: Canadian Car and Foundry
- Operators: French Navy
- Cost: $2.5 million (for entire class)
- Built: 1918
- Planned: 12
- Completed: 12

General characteristics
- Type: Minesweeper
- Length: 41.3 metres (135 ft)
- Beam: 6.9 metres (23 ft)
- Propulsion: Twin screws
- Speed: 12 knots (22 km/h; 14 mph)
- Complement: 36 crew
- Armament: 2 × 100 mm (4 in) deck-mounted guns

The Navarin class was a class of 12 minesweepers built by Canadian Car and Foundry for the French Navy in 1918, near the end of World War I. The class is mainly remembered for the disappearance of two of its members, Inkerman and Cerisoles, during their maiden voyage on Lake Superior in November 1918.

== Description ==
The ships were designed to clear naval mines along the coast of France and in the English Channel. French naval documents refer to the ships as chalutiers rather than dragueurs de mines, as the ships were designed to function as fishing trawlers after the war.

A contract for $2.5 million awarded to Canadian Car and Foundry to construct 12 minesweepers for the French government was reported in February 1918. Built in what was then known as Fort William, Ontario, half of the order was completed by early November 1918, and the entire order was finished before the end of the year.

Each vessel was 135 feet (41 m) long and rated at 321 gross register tonnage. Their steel-framed wooden hulls were divided into four water-tight compartments. Each ship was fitted with twin screws and a single funnel, and had a top speed of about 12 knots (22 km/h; 14 mph). Two 100 mm (4 in) deck-mounted guns, with a range of about 20 kilometres (22,000 yd; 12 miles), were located forward and aft.

In November 1918, three of the minesweepers—Inkerman, Cerisoles, and Sebastopol—encountered severe weather while attempting to cross Lake Superior; Sebastopol reached its destination, but the other two ships and their crews were lost; no wreckage of the ships has been located.

== Ships of the class ==
A total of 12 Navarin-class minesweepers were built; their names, as listed below, were published in The Gazette of Montreal in November 1918. Seven members of the class are known to have been lost; the fate of the other five members of the class is unclear.

Hull #	Original name	Launched	Completed	Namesake	Disposition	Ref.
1	Navarin	29 July 1918	20 September 1918	Battle of Navarino (1827)	Deleted 1965	
2	Mantoue	13 August 1918	5 October 1918	Siege of Mantua (1796–1797)	Sold 1949	
3	St. Georges	21 August 1918	26 October 1918	Battle of Nuits Saint Georges (1870)	Deleted 1952	
4	Leoben	29 August 1918	1 November 1918	Peace of Leoben (1797)	Deleted 1933	
5	Palestro	19 August 1918	16 October 1918	Battle of Palestro (1859)	Deleted 1936	
6	Lutzen	31 August 1918	6 November 1918	Battle of Lützen (1813)	Wrecked on Nauset Beach, Cape Cod 1939	
7	Bautzen	14 September 1918	12 November 1918	Battle of Bautzen (1813)	Foundered off Saint Pierre Island 1961 as Peary MV	
8	Inkerman	3 October 1918	21 November 1918	Battle of Inkerman (1854)	Lost without trace 1918	
9	Cerisoles	25 September 1918	21 November 1918	Battle of Cérisoles (1544)	Lost without trace 1918	
10	Sebastopol	30 September 1918	21 November 1918	Siege of Sevastopol (1854–1855)	Sold 1920; wrecked off Cape St. Francis 1933	
11	Malakoff	1 October 1918	17 November 1918	Battle of Malakoff (1855)	Sold 1920; foundered at Bay Roberts 1974 as Illex MV	
12	Seneff	20 September 1918	15 November 1918	Battle of Seneffe (1674)	Sold 1920; wrecked near Canso, Nova Scotia 1955	
