= Turcot, Quebec =

Coordinates: 45°28′04″N 73°35′59″W

Turcot is a former village in the city of Montreal, Quebec, Canada. A road junction (the Turcot Interchange), a railway yard and a city park are also named Turcot, and a street is named rue Philippe-Turcot.

The name comes from Philippe Turcot (1791–1861), a merchant and landowner, who sold building lots over the period 1847 to 1860 that became a village known as Turcot.
