= German Type Mittel U submarine =

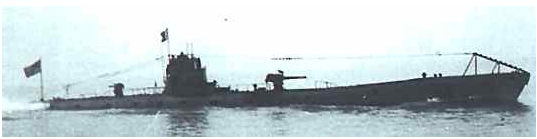
- SM U-86, a Mittel U submarine

Class overview
- Builders: AG Weser, Bremen; Germaniawerft, Kiel; Kaiserliche Werft, Danzig; Bremer Vulkan, Vegesack
- Operators: Imperial German Navy
- Preceded by: Type U 66
- Completed: 46

General characteristics
- Displacement: 808 tonnes (795 long tons)(surfaced); 946 tonnes (931 long tons) (submerged); 1,160 tonnes (1,140 long tons) (total)
- Length: 70.60 m (231 ft 8 in) (overall); 55.55 m (182 ft 3 in) (pressure hull)
- Beam: 6.30 m (20 ft 8 in) (overall); 4.15 m (13 ft 7 in) (pressure hull)
- Draught: 4.02 m (13 ft 2 in)
- Propulsion: 2 hp × 2,400 hp (1.5 kW × 1,789.7 kW) (surfaced); 2 hp × 1,200 hp (1.5 kW × 894.8 kW) (submerged)
- Speed: 16.8 knots (31.1 km/h; 19.3 mph) (surfaced); 9.1 knots (16.9 km/h; 10.5 mph) (submerged)
- Range: 11,220 mi (9,750 nmi; 18,060 km) (surfaced) 56 mi (49 nmi; 90 km) (submerged)
- Complement: 39 men
- Armament: 16 torpedoes (4/2 in bow/stern tubes); 105mm deck gun with 220 rounds; 88mm deck gun

Mittel U was a class of U-boats built during World War I by the Kaiserliche Marine.

Mittel U U-boats carried 16 torpedoes and had various arrangements of deck guns. Some had only one 88mm gun while others had a single 105mm gun, but most had both originally. In 1917 some of the boats were refitted with a single 105mm gun.

They carried a crew of 39 and had excellent seagoing abilities with a cruising range of around 11,220 miles. Many arrangements from the Mittel U were also seen on the World War II Type IX U-boats, when their design work took place 20 years later.

Between 1915 and 1919 46 were built, amongst them U-88 with Walther Schwieger as commander and U-103 with Claus Rücker.

== List of Type Mittel U submarines ==
There were 46 Type Mittel U submarines commissioned into the Kaiserliche Marine.

- SM U-81
- SM U-82
- SM U-83
- SM U-84
- SM U-85
- SM U-86
- SM U-87
- SM U-88
- SM U-89
- SM U-90
- SM U-91
- SM U-92
- SM U-93
- SM U-94
- SM U-95
- SM U-96
- SM U-97
- SM U-98
- SM U-99
- SM U-100
- SM U-101
- SM U-102
- SM U-103
- SM U-104
- SM U-105
- SM U-106
- SM U-107
- SM U-108
- SM U-109
- SM U-110
- SM U-111
- SM U-112
- SM U-113
- SM U-114
- SM U-135
- SM U-136
- SM U-137
- SM U-138
- SM U-160
- SM U-161
- SM U-162
- SM U-163
- SM U-164
- SM U-165
- SM U-166
- SM U-167
