= German submarine U-163 =

U-163 may refer to one of the following German submarines:

- SM U-163, a Type U 93 submarine launched in 1918; served in World War I until surrendered on 22 November 1918; broken up at La Spezia in August 1919
- German submarine U-163 (1941), a Type IXC submarine that served in World War II until sunk on 13 March 1943
