= German submarine U-112 =

U-112 may refer to one of the following German submarines:

- SM U-112, a Type U 93 submarine launched in 1917 that served in the First World War and was surrendered in 1918; broken up at Upnor 1922
  - During the First World War, Germany also had this submarine with a similar name:
    - SM UB-112, a Type UB III submarine launched in 1917 and was surrendered in 1918; dumped on beach at Falmouth after explosive trials 1921 and broken up in situ
- German submarine U-112 (1939), would have been a Type XIB submarine, a large cruiser-type submarine capable of carrying an Arado Ar 231 aircraft; laid down in 1939, but cancelled after the outbreak of the Second World War
