= German submarine U-165 =

U-165 may refer to one of the following German submarines:

- SM U-165, a Type U 93 submarine launched in 1918; served in World War I until accidentally sunk on 18 November 1918 before surrendering; raised and stricken on 21 February 1919; broken up
- German submarine U-165 (1941), a Type IXC submarine that served in World War II until sunk on 27 September 1942
