= German submarine U-164 =

U-164 may refer to one of the following German submarines:

- SM U-164, a Type U 93 submarine launched in 1918; served in World War I until surrendered on 22 November 1918; broken up at Swansea in 1922
- German submarine U-164 (1941), a Type IXC submarine that served in World War II until sunk on 6 January 1943
