= German submarine U-97 =

U-97 may refer to one of the following German submarines:

- SM U-97, a Type U 93 submarine launched in 1917 and that served in the First World War until accidentally sunk on 20 November 1918 on way to surrender
  - During the First World War, Germany also had these submarines with similar names:
    - SM UB-97, a Type UB III submarine launched in 1918 and surrendered on 21 November 1918; dumped on beach at Falmouth after explosive trials 1921 and broken up in situ
    - SM UC-97, a Type UC III submarine launched in 1918 and surrendered on 22 November 1918; used as an exhibition in the United States; sunk on Lake Michigan on 7 June 1921 by gunfire from USS Wilmette
- German submarine U-97 (1940), a Type VIIC submarine that served in the Second World War until sunk on 16 June 1943
