= German submarine U-114 =

U-114 may refer to one of the following German submarines:

- SM U-114, a Type U 93 submarine launched in 1917 that served in the First World War and was surrendered in 1918
  - During the First World War, Germany also had this submarine with a similar name:
    - SM UB-114, a Type UB III submarine launched in 1917 and sunk in 1918; raised but was surrendered in 1918
- German submarine U-114 (1939), would have been a Type XIB submarine, a large cruiser submarine capable of carrying an Arado Ar 231 aircraft; laid down in 1939, but cancelled after the outbreak of the Second World War. As a Type VIIC U-boat its number was used as the fictitious setting for much of the novel by Charles McCain (2009). An Honorable German. Grand Central Publishing. ISBN 978-0-446-53898-5.
