= German submarine U-166 =

U-166 may refer to one of the following German submarines:

- SM U-166, a Type U 93 submarine launched in 1918; served in World War I until surrendered on 21 March 1919; became French submarine Jean Roulier until 24 July 1935; broken up.
- German submarine U-166 (1941), a Type IXC submarine that served in World War II until being destroyed on 30 July 1942, thus being the only submarine sunk in the Gulf of Mexico during World War II. The wreck was found on 10 January 2001
