= SM U-160 =

History

German Empire
- Name: U-160
- Ordered: 9 February 1917
- Builder: Bremer Vulkan, Vegesack
- Launched: 27 February 1918
- Commissioned: 26 May 1918
- Fate: Surrendered to France 20 November 1918

General characteristics
- Class & type: Type U 93 submarine
- Displacement: 821 t (808 long tons) surfaced; 1,002 t (986 long tons) submerged
- Length: 71.55 m (234 ft 9 in) (o/a); 56.05 m (183 ft 11 in) (pressure hull)
- Beam: 6.30 m (20 ft 8 in) (o/a); 4.15 m (13 ft 7 in) (pressure hull)
- Height: 8.25 m (27 ft 1 in)
- Draught: 3.88 m (12 ft 9 in)
- Installed power: 2 × 2,400 PS (1,765 kW; 2,367 shp) surfaced; 2 × 1,230 PS (905 kW; 1,213 shp) submerged
- Propulsion: 2 shafts, 2 × 1.70 m (5 ft 7 in) propellers
- Speed: 16.2 knots (30.0 km/h; 18.6 mph) surfaced; 8.2 knots (15.2 km/h; 9.4 mph) submerged
- Range: 8,500 nmi (15,700 km; 9,800 mi) at 8 knots (15 km/h; 9.2 mph) surfaced; 50 nmi (93 km; 58 mi) at 5 knots (9.3 km/h; 5.8 mph) submerged
- Test depth: 50 m (164 ft 1 in)
- Complement: 4 officers, 32 enlisted
- Armament: 6 × 50 cm (19.7 in) torpedo tubes (four bow, two stern); 12-16 torpedoes; 2 × 10.5 cm (4.1 in) SK L/45 deck guns

Service record
- Part of: IV Flotilla; Unknown start – 11 November 1918
- Commanders: K.Kapt. Otto Wiebalck; 26 May – 11 November 1918
- Operations: 1 patrol
- Victories: None

SM U-160 (Note: "SM" stands for "Seiner Majestät" (English: His Majesty's) and combined with the U for Unterseeboot would be translated as His Majesty's Submarine.) was one of the 329 submarines serving in the Imperial German Navy in World War I. U-160 was engaged in the naval warfare and took part in the First Battle of the Atlantic.

== Design ==
Type U 93 submarines were preceded by the shorter Type U 87 submarines. U-160 had a displacement of 821 tonnes (808 long tons) when at the surface and 1,002 tonnes (986 long tons) while submerged. She had a total length of 71.55 metres (234 ft 9 in), a pressure hull length of 56.05 m (183 ft 11 in), a beam of 6.30 m (20 ft 8 in), a height of 8.25 m (27 ft 1 in), and a draught of 3.88 m (12 ft 9 in). The submarine was powered by two 2,400 metric horsepower (1,800 kW; 2,400 shp) engines for use while surfaced, and two 1,230 metric horsepower (900 kW; 1,210 shp) engines for use while submerged. She had two propeller shafts and two 1.70 m (5 ft 7 in) propellers. She was capable of operating at depths of up to 50 metres (160 ft).

The submarine had a maximum surface speed of 16.2 knots (30.0 km/h; 18.6 mph) and a maximum submerged speed of 8.2 knots (15.2 km/h; 9.4 mph). When submerged, she could operate for 50 nautical miles (93 km; 58 mi) at 5 knots (9.3 km/h; 5.8 mph); when surfaced, she could travel 8,500 nautical miles (15,700 km; 9,800 mi) at 8 knots (15 km/h; 9.2 mph). U-160 was fitted with six 50 centimetres (20 in) torpedo tubes (four at the bow and two at the stern), twelve to sixteen torpedoes, and two 10.5 cm (4.1 in) SK L/45 deck guns. She had a complement of thirty-six (thirty-two crew members and four officers).

== Bibliography ==
- Gröner, Erich; Jung, Dieter; Maass, Martin (1991). U-boats and Mine Warfare Vessels. German Warships 1815–1945. Vol. 2. Translated by Thomas, Keith; Magowan, Rachel. London: Conway Maritime Press. ISBN 0-85177-593-4.
