= SM U-98 =

Type U 93 submarine

History

German Empire
- Name: U-98
- Ordered: 15 September 1915
- Builder: Germaniawerft, Kiel
- Yard number: 262
- Launched: 28 February 1917
- Commissioned: 31 May 1917
- Fate: Surrendered 16 January 1919

General characteristics
- Class & type: Type U 93 submarine
- Displacement: 837 t (824 long tons) surfaced; 998 t (982 long tons) submerged
- Length: 71.55 m (234 ft 9 in) (o/a); 56.05 m (183 ft 11 in) (pressure hull)
- Beam: 6.30 m (20 ft 8 in) (o/a); 4.15 m (13 ft 7 in) (pressure hull)
- Height: 8.25 m (27 ft 1 in)
- Draught: 3.94 m (12 ft 11 in)
- Installed power: 2 × 2,300 PS (1,692 kW; 2,269 shp) surfaced; 2 × 1,200 PS (883 kW; 1,184 shp) submerged
- Propulsion: 2 shafts, 2 × 1.66 m (5 ft 5 in) propellers
- Speed: 16.9 knots (31.3 km/h; 19.4 mph) surfaced; 8.6 knots (15.9 km/h; 9.9 mph) submerged
- Range: 8,290 nmi (15,350 km; 9,540 mi) at 8 knots (15 km/h; 9.2 mph) surfaced; 47 nmi (87 km; 54 mi) at 5 knots (9.3 km/h; 5.8 mph) submerged
- Test depth: 50 m (160 ft)
- Complement: 4 officers, 32 enlisted
- Armament: 6 × 50 cm (19.7 in) torpedo tubes (four bow, two stern); 12–16 torpedoes; 1 × 10.5 cm (4.1 in) SK L/45 deck gun

Service record
- Part of: IV Flotilla; 9 September 1917 – 11 November 1918
- Commanders: Kptlt. Curt Beitzen; 31 May – 24 November 1917; Oblt.z.S. Walter Strasser; 25 November – 21 December 1917; Kptlt. Rudolf Andler; 22 December 1917 – 11 November 1918
- Operations: 5 patrols
- Victories: 3 merchant ships sunk (1,750 GRT); 1 merchant ship damaged (5,430 GRT)

SM U-98 was a Type U 93 submarine and one of the 329 submarines serving in the Imperial German Navy in World War I. U-98 was engaged in the naval warfare and took part in the First Battle of the Atlantic.

== Design ==
Type U 93 submarines were preceded by the shorter Type U 87 submarines. U-98 had a displacement of 838 tonnes (825 long tons) when at the surface and 1,000 tonnes (980 long tons) while submerged. She had a total length of 71.55 m (234 ft 9 in), a pressure hull length of 56.05 m (183 ft 11 in), a beam of 6.30 m (20 ft 8 in), a height of 8.25 m (27 ft 1 in), and a draught of 3.94 m (12 ft 11 in). The submarine was powered by two 2,300 metric horsepower (1,700 kW; 2,300 shp) engines for use while surfaced, and two 1,200 metric horsepower (880 kW; 1,200 shp) engines for use while submerged. She had two propeller shafts. She was capable of operating at depths of up to 50 metres (160 ft).

The submarine had a maximum surface speed of 16.8 knots (31.1 km/h; 19.3 mph) and a maximum submerged speed of 8.6 knots (15.9 km/h; 9.9 mph). When submerged, she could operate for 47 nautical miles (87 km; 54 mi) at 5 knots (9.3 km/h; 5.8 mph); when surfaced, she could travel 8,290 nautical miles (15,350 km; 9,540 mi) at 8 knots (15 km/h; 9.2 mph). U-98 was fitted with six 50 centimetres (20 in) torpedo tubes (four at the bow and two at the stern), twelve to sixteen torpedoes, and one 10.5 cm (4.1 in) SK L/45 deck gun. She had a complement of thirty-six (thirty-two crew members and four officers).

== Summary of raiding history ==
Date	Name	Nationality	Tonnage (Note: Merchant ship tonnages are in gross register tons. Military vessels are listed by tons displacement.)	Fate
24 March 1918	Anchoria	United Kingdom	5,430	Damaged
26 May 1918	Janvold	Norway	1,366	Sunk
14 July 1918	Maurice	France	115	Sunk
31 July 1918	Alkor	Norway	269	Sunk

== Bibliography ==
- Gröner, Erich; Jung, Dieter; Maass, Martin (1991). U-boats and Mine Warfare Vessels. German Warships 1815–1945. Vol. 2. Translated by Thomas, Keith; Magowan, Rachel. London: Conway Maritime Press. ISBN 0-85177-593-4.
