= SM U-111 =

German submarine

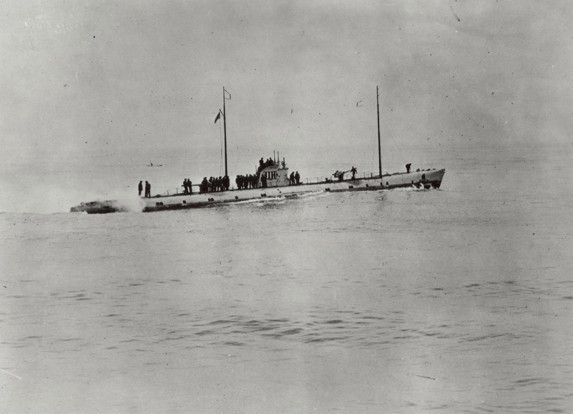
- SM U-111 at sea, 1919

History

German Empire
- Name: U-111
- Ordered: 5 May 1916
- Builder: Germaniawerft, Kiel
- Yard number: 280
- Launched: 5 September 1917
- Commissioned: 30 December 1917
- Fate: Surrendered to Great Britain 20 November 1918, transferred to the United States Navy 25 March 1919

United States
- Name: U-111
- Acquired: 3 April 1919
- Fate: Sunk by USS Falcon 31 August 1922

General characteristics
- Class & type: Type U 93 submarine
- Displacement: 798 t (785 long tons) surfaced; 996 t (980 long tons) submerged
- Length: 71.55 m (234 ft 9 in) (o/a); 56.05 m (183 ft 11 in) (pressure hull)
- Beam: 6.30 m (20 ft 8 in) (o/a); 4.15 m (13 ft 7 in) (pressure hull)
- Height: 8.25 m (27 ft 1 in)
- Draught: 3.76 m (12 ft 4 in)
- Installed power: 2 × 2,300 PS (1,692 kW; 2,269 shp) surfaced; 2 × 1,200 PS (883 kW; 1,184 shp) submerged
- Propulsion: 2 shafts, 2 × 1.70 m (5 ft 7 in) propellers
- Speed: 16.4 knots (30.4 km/h; 18.9 mph) surfaced; 8.4 knots (15.6 km/h; 9.7 mph) submerged
- Range: 8,300 nmi (15,400 km; 9,600 mi) at 8 knots (15 km/h; 9.2 mph) surfaced; 50 nmi (93 km; 58 mi) at 5 knots (9.3 km/h; 5.8 mph) submerged
- Test depth: 50 m (164 ft 1 in)
- Complement: 4 officers, 32 enlisted
- Armament: 6 × 50 cm (19.7 in) torpedo tubes (four bow, two stern); 12-16 torpedoes; 1 × 10.5 cm (4.1 in) SK L/45 deck gun; 1 × 8.8 cm (3.5 in) SK L/30 deck gun

Service record
- Part of: Imperial German Navy: IV Flotilla; Unknown start – 11 November 1918
- Commanders: Kptlt. Hans Beyersdorff; 30 December 1917 – 11 November 1918
- Operations: 4 patrols
- Victories: 3 merchant ships sunk (3,011 GRT)

Service record
- Part of: United States Navy: Ex-German Submarine Expeditionary Force; 25 March 1919 - 31 August 1922
- Commanders: LCDR Freeland A. Daubin, 1919; LCDR Garnet Hulings, 1919 - Unknown end
- Operations: Victory Liberty Loan, comparison and operational tests

SM U-111 (Note: "SM" stands for "Seiner Majestät" (English: His Majesty's) and combined with the U for Unterseeboot would be translated as His Majesty's Submarine.) was one of the 329 submarines serving in the Imperial German Navy in World War I. She took part in the First Battle of the Atlantic.

Completed at Kiel early in January 1918, she went to the Kiel School for shakedown and training until March, when she joined IV Flotilla. She was monitored continuously by British Naval Intelligence (Room 40), on which her movement reports are based. All her operations took place in 1918.

== Service history ==
She departed 26 March on her first war patrol, operating in the Irish Sea and western entrance to the English Channel, sinking two steamers and returning to Kiel and 23 April. Her second patrol began 27 May, sailing from Heligoland Bight via Muckle Flugga to the western English Channel. She sank at least one confirmed steamer, and returned the same way, arriving 24 June. Her third patrol, between 25 August and 29 September, was via Fastnet and Scillies into the Irish Sea, where she was hampered by British A/S patrols and obtained no sinkings.

She was the only submarine which had a clergyman on board (Wilhelm Meinhold, Marinepfarrer).

== Post War Career ==
U-111 surrendered at Harwich, England 20 November 1918, after the Armistice. On 7 April 1919, under the command of Lieutenant Commander Freeland A. Daubin, she sailed for the United States after 12 days of preparations and testing. On her mast the United States flag flew above the Reich War Flag. She arrived first at Portland, Maine on 18 April 1919, and then in New York City, New York on 19 April 1919 where U-111 docked at the Brooklyn Navy Yard. The U-111, along with four other captured German submarines that were brought to the United States, were used to promote the sale of the Victory Liberty Loan. The U-111 can be seen in a short newsreel film after her arrival on YouTube.

Originally the U-164 was supposed to come to the United States, but it was found in such atrocious shape that the U-111 was substituted. The other ships that were brought over to the United States were U-117, U-140, UB-88, UB-148, and UC-97. All sailed to America under their own power except U-140 which was towed. These submarines were listed in U.S. Navy records as the Ex-German Submarine Expeditionary Force.

By early September 1919 the U-111 had completed a head-to-head comparison test against the American submarine USS S-3 (SS-107). It was found that, "The American boat is speedier, has a greater radius of action and is much more habitable than the German boats. Naval officers are of the opinion that the American submarine is the more seaworthy." A summary of the results of the tests from this article are shown in the following table.

Comparison of German U-111 to American S-3
| Characteristic | U-111 | S-3 |
|---|---|---|
| Maximum surface speed | 13.8 knots | 14.7 knots |
| Submerged speed | 7.8 knots | 12.4 knots |
| Cruise range | 8,500 miles at 8 knots | 10,000 miles at 11 knots |
| Number of torpedoes | 12 | 12 |
| Number of guns | Two 4-inch, one forward, one aft | One 4-inch forward |
| Displacement | 830 tons | 854 tons |
| Length | 235 feet | 231 feet |
| Beam | 21 feet | 21.5 feet |
| Draft | 12.5 feet | 12.5 feet |
| Other findings | Congested, overly complicated, difficult to maintain | Habitable, accessible, more seaworthy, decks drier |

During the period of October 1919 to April 1920 U-111 was used for mechanical efficiency experiments off the coast of Florida and Cuba. During these trials she achieved better speeds than in the test results shown above. She was able to go 17.08 knots on the surface, and the submerged speed was almost one knot better than the Germans were able to achieve. The submarine traveled over 11,000 miles, there were no problems during her operation, and the only maintenance performed was of a routine nature (cleaning, painting, etc.). She then made her way to Portsmouth, New Hampshire for decommissioning and destruction.

The U-111's final days on the seas were supposed to conclude in 1921. On 18 June 1921, while being towed from Portsmouth, New Hampshire, to be used as a target for aerial bombing by airplanes, she started to take on water. She sank about three miles off the coast of Cape Henry, Virginia, in 35 feet of water, well short of the 50 miles offshore where the tests were to take place. The stern of the submarine remained protruding above the water. Considered a navigation hazard, she was raised on 14 August 1922 by the USS Falcon, placed on pontoons, brought back to Norfolk Navy Yard, where she sank again in Number 3 dry dock before it could be pumped out. The submarine was refloated one more time, patched up, and on 30 August 1922 she made a final journey to sea. The U-111 was sunk on 31 August 1922 when her hatches were opened, and the USS Falcon set off a depth charge by the sub. Her remains are approximately 400 feet below the ocean surface near the Winter Quarters Shoal lightship along the Virginia coast.

The exact site of U-111's remains had been lost to history until September 5, 2022 when shipwreck explorers, using an ROV, identified the wreckage of U-111 in 400 feet of water 40 miles off the coast of Virginia.

== Summary of raiding history ==
| Date | Name | Nationality | Tonnage (Note: Tonnages are in gross register tons) | Fate |
|---|---|---|---|---|
| 7 April 1918 | Boscastle | United Kingdom | 2,346 | Sunk by torpedo |
| 28 May 1918 | Dronning Margrethe | Denmark | 393 | Sunk by deck gun |
| 22 June 1918 | Rana | Norway | 272 | Sunk by deck gun |

== Gallery ==
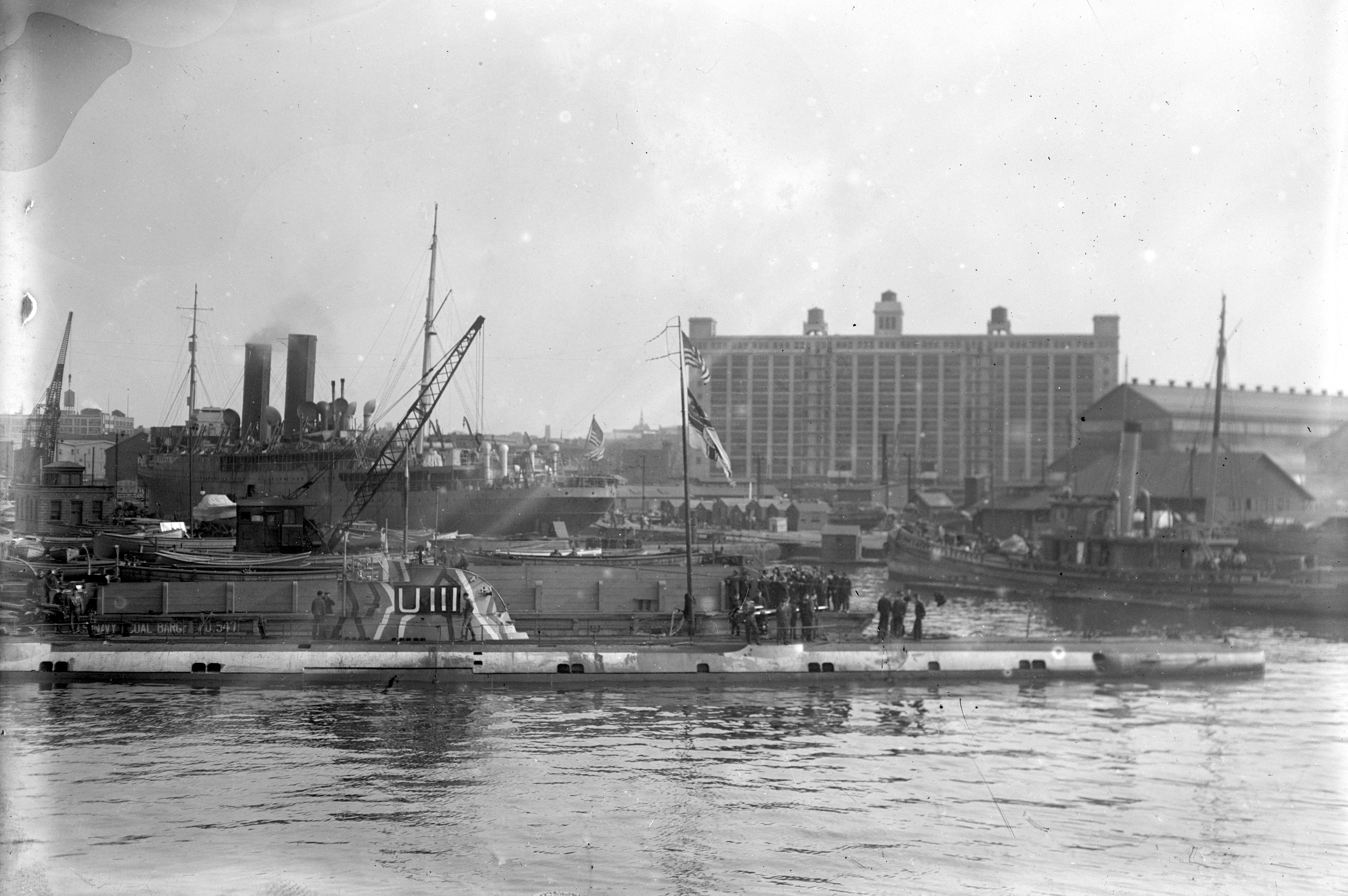
U-111 at New York City, 1919

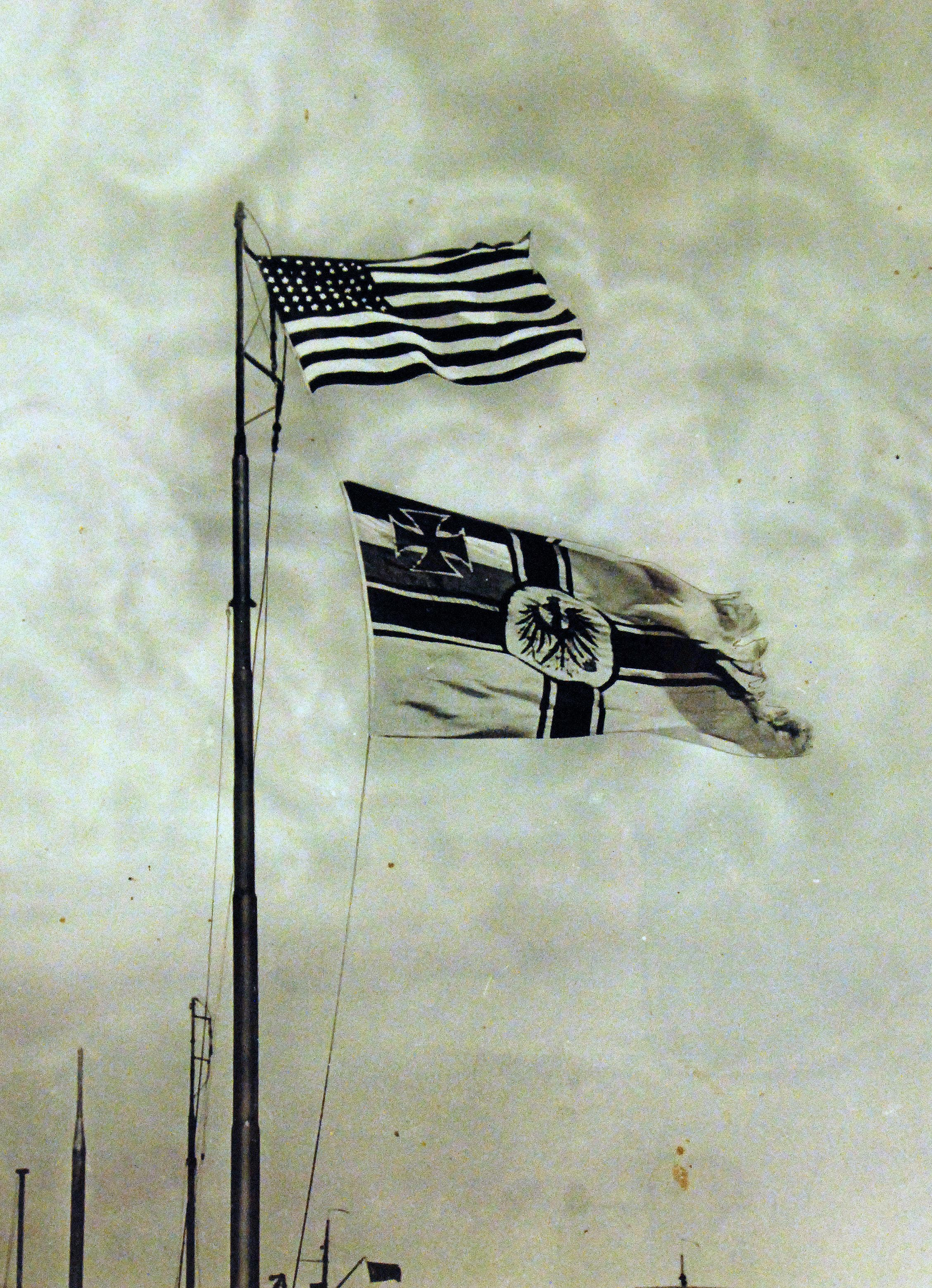
United States and German flags flying above U-111

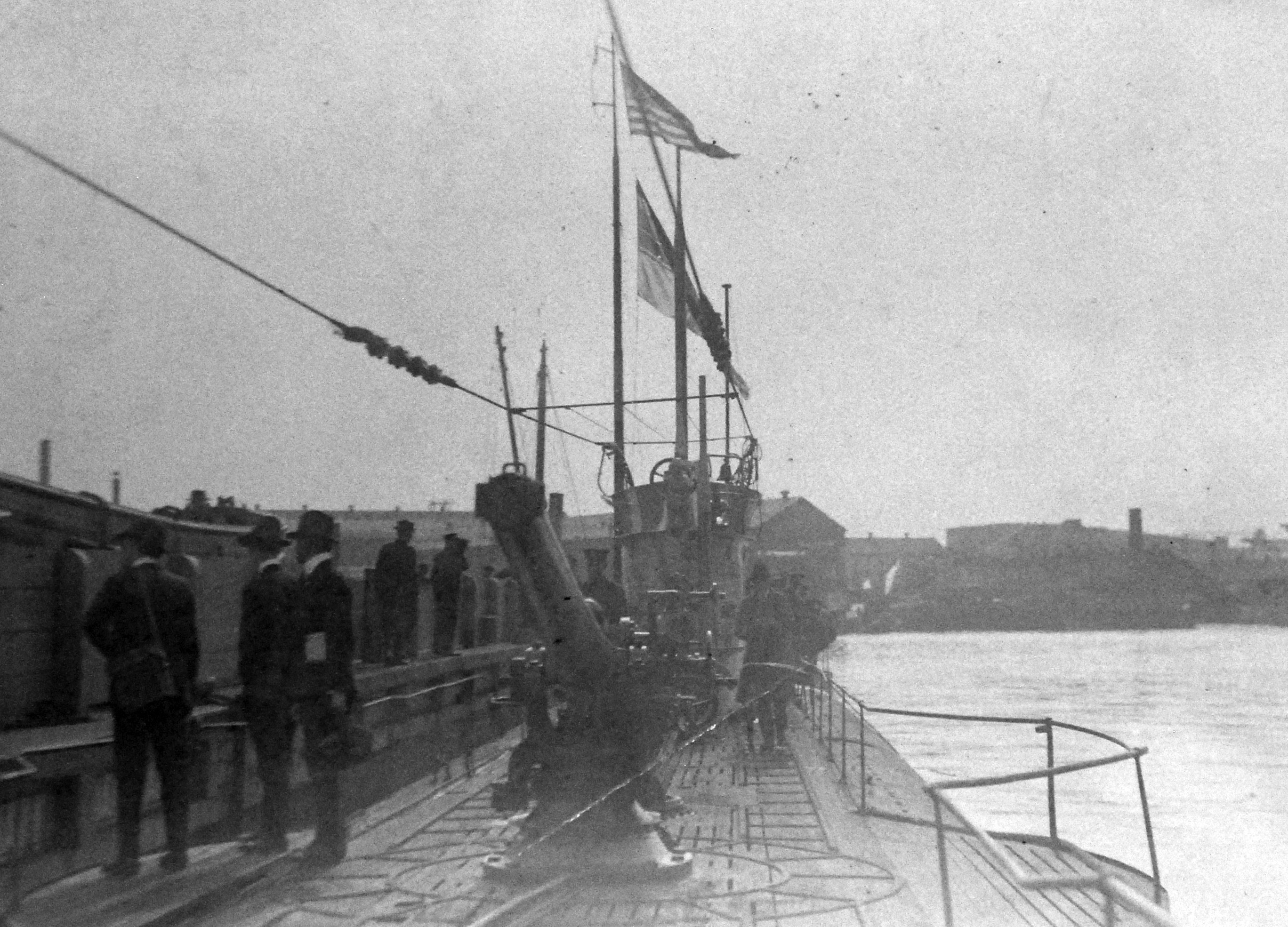
U-111 at New York City, 24 April 1919

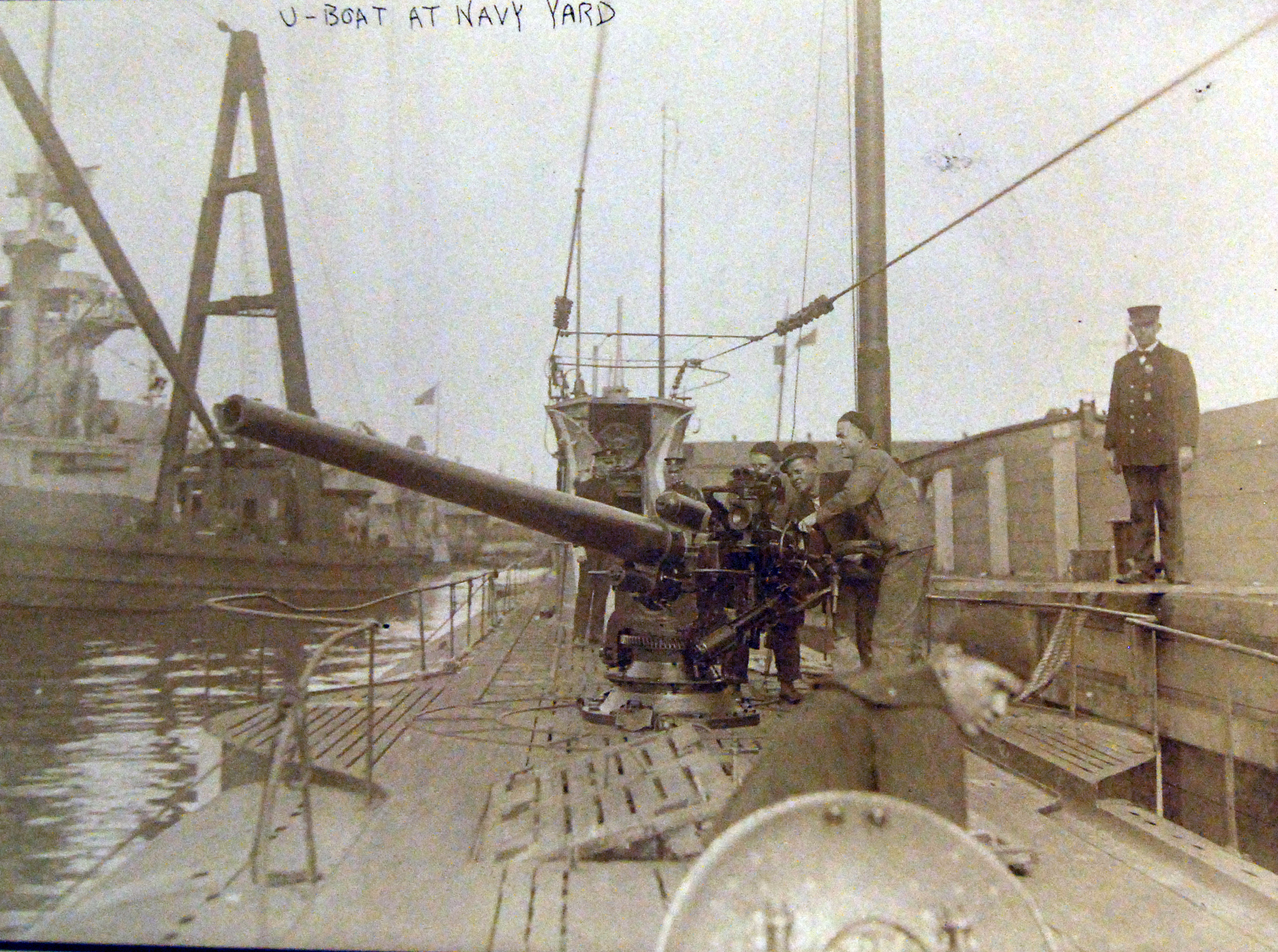
4" gun of U-111 at New York City, 24 April 1919

== Bibliography ==
- Gröner, Erich; Jung, Dieter; Maass, Martin (1991). U-boats and Mine Warfare Vessels. German Warships 1815–1945. Vol. 2. Translated by Thomas, Keith; Magowan, Rachel. London: Conway Maritime Press. ISBN 0-85177-593-4.
- Spindler, Arno (1966) [1932]. Der Handelskrieg mit U-Booten. 5 Vols. Berlin: Mittler & Sohn. Vols. 4+5, dealing with 1917+18, are very hard to find: Guildhall Library, London, has them all, also Vol. 1-3 in an English translation: The submarine war against commerce.
- Beesly, Patrick (1982). Room 40: British Naval Intelligence 1914-1918. London: H Hamilton. ISBN 978-0-241-10864-2.
- Halpern, Paul G. (1995). A Naval History of World War I. New York: Routledge. ISBN 978-1-85728-498-0.
- Roessler, Eberhard (1997). Die Unterseeboote der Kaiserlichen Marine. Bonn: Bernard & Graefe. ISBN 978-3-7637-5963-7.
- Schroeder, Joachim (2002). Die U-Boote des Kaisers. Bonn: Bernard & Graefe. ISBN 978-3-7637-6235-4.
- Koerver, Hans Joachim (2008). Room 40: German Naval Warfare 1914-1918. Vol I., The Fleet in Action. Steinbach: LIS Reinisch. ISBN 978-3-902433-76-3.
- Koerver, Hans Joachim (2009). Room 40: German Naval Warfare 1914-1918. Vol II., The Fleet in Being. Steinbach: LIS Reinisch. ISBN 978-3-902433-77-0.
