= SM U-97 =

Submarine serving in the Imperial German Navy in World War I

History

German Empire
- Name: U-97
- Ordered: 15 September 1915
- Builder: Germaniawerft, Kiel
- Yard number: 261
- Laid down: 25 March 1916
- Launched: 4 April 1917
- Commissioned: 16 May 1917
- Fate: Sank 21 November 1918 en route to surrender

General characteristics
- Class & type: Type U 93 submarine
- Displacement: 837 t (824 long tons) surfaced; 998 t (982 long tons) submerged
- Length: 71.55 m (234 ft 9 in) (o/a); 56.05 m (183 ft 11 in) (pressure hull)
- Beam: 6.30 m (20 ft 8 in) (o/a); 4.15 m (13 ft 7 in) (pressure hull)
- Height: 8.25 m (27 ft 1 in)
- Draught: 3.94 m (12 ft 11 in)
- Installed power: 2 × 2,300 PS (1,692 kW; 2,269 shp) surfaced; 2 × 1,200 PS (883 kW; 1,184 shp) submerged
- Propulsion: 2 shafts, 2 × 1.66 m (5 ft 5 in) propellers
- Speed: 16.9 knots (31.3 km/h; 19.4 mph) surfaced; 8.6 knots (15.9 km/h; 9.9 mph) submerged
- Range: 8,290 nmi (15,350 km; 9,540 mi) at 8 knots (15 km/h; 9.2 mph) surfaced; 47 nmi (87 km; 54 mi) at 5 knots (9.3 km/h; 5.8 mph) submerged
- Test depth: 50 m (160 ft)
- Complement: 4 officers, 32 enlisted
- Armament: 6 × 50 cm (19.7 in) torpedo tubes (four bow, two stern); 12–16 torpedoes; 1 × 10.5 cm (4.1 in) SK L/45 deck gun

Service record
- Part of: IV Flotilla; 27 August 1917 – 11 November 1918
- Commanders: Kptlt. Hugo Schmidt; 15 May 1917 – 13 October 1917; Kptlt. Otto Wünsche; 14 October 1917 – 12 January 1918; Kptlt. Hans von Mohl; 13 January – 11 November 1918
- Operations: 5 patrols
- Victories: 3 merchant ships sunk (622 GRT); 1 auxiliary warship sunk (1,467 GRT); 1 merchant ship damaged (4,785 GRT)

SM U-97 was one of the 329 submarines serving in the Imperial German Navy in World War I. U-97 was engaged in the naval warfare and took part in the First Battle of the Atlantic. The German unit sank by accident on her way to surrender at position 53°25′N 3°10′E.

== Design ==
Type U 93 submarines were preceded by the shorter Type U 87 submarines. U-97 had a displacement of 838 tonnes (825 long tons) when at the surface and 1,000 tonnes (980 long tons) while submerged. She had a total length of 71.55 m (234 ft 9 in), a pressure hull length of 56.05 m (183 ft 11 in), a beam of 6.30 m (20 ft 8 in), a height of 8.25 m (27 ft 1 in), and a draught of 3.94 m (12 ft 11 in). The submarine was powered by two 2,300 metric horsepower (1,700 kW; 2,300 shp) engines for use while surfaced, and two 1,200 metric horsepower (880 kW; 1,200 shp) engines for use while submerged. She had two propeller shafts. She was capable of operating at depths of up to 50 metres (160 ft).

The submarine had a maximum surface speed of 16.8 knots (31.1 km/h; 19.3 mph) and a maximum submerged speed of 8.6 knots (15.9 km/h; 9.9 mph). When submerged, she could operate for 47 nautical miles (87 km; 54 mi) at 5 knots (9.3 km/h; 5.8 mph); when surfaced, she could travel 8,290 nautical miles (15,350 km; 9,540 mi) at 8 knots (15 km/h; 9.2 mph). U-97 was fitted with six 50 centimetres (20 in) torpedo tubes (four at the bow and two at the stern), twelve to sixteen torpedoes, and one 8.8 cm (3.5 in) SK L/30 deck gun. She had a complement of thirty-six (thirty-two crew members and four officers).

== Summary of raiding history ==
Date	Name	Nationality	Tonnage (Note: Merchant ship tonnages are in gross register tons. Military vessels are listed by tons displacement.)	Fate
22 November 1917	Conovium	United Kingdom	86	Sunk
22 November 1917	Elsena	United Kingdom	335	Sunk
22 November 1917	Hartland	United Kingdom	4,785	Damaged
11 February 1918	HMS Westphalia	Royal Navy	1,467	Sunk
2 June 1918	Argus	Denmark	201	Sunk

== Bibliography ==
- Gröner, Erich; Jung, Dieter; Maass, Martin (1991). U-boats and Mine Warfare Vessels. German Warships 1815–1945. Vol. 2. Translated by Thomas, Keith; Magowan, Rachel. London: Conway Maritime Press. ISBN 0-85177-593-4.
