= SM U-163 =

Submarine serving in the Imperial German Navy in World War I

History

German Empire
- Name: U-163
- Ordered: 9 February 1917
- Builder: Bremer Vulkan, Vegesack
- Launched: 1 June 1918
- Commissioned: 21 August 1918
- Fate: Surrendered to Italy 22 November 1918, Broken up 1919

General characteristics
- Class & type: Type U 93 submarine
- Displacement: 821 t (808 long tons) surfaced; 1,002 t (986 long tons) submerged
- Length: 71.55 m (234 ft 9 in) (o/a); 56.05 m (183 ft 11 in) (pressure hull)
- Beam: 6.30 m (20 ft 8 in) (o/a); 4.15 m (13 ft 7 in) (pressure hull)
- Height: 8.25 m (27 ft 1 in)
- Draught: 3.88 m (12 ft 9 in)
- Installed power: 2 × 2,400 PS (1,765 kW; 2,367 shp) surfaced; 2 × 1,230 PS (905 kW; 1,213 shp) submerged
- Propulsion: 2 shafts, 2 × 1.70 m (5 ft 7 in) propellers
- Speed: 16.2 knots (30.0 km/h; 18.6 mph) surfaced; 8.2 knots (15.2 km/h; 9.4 mph) submerged
- Range: 8,500 nmi (15,700 km; 9,800 mi) at 8 knots (15 km/h; 9.2 mph) surfaced; 50 nmi (93 km; 58 mi) at 5 knots (9.3 km/h; 5.8 mph) submerged
- Test depth: 50 m (164 ft 1 in)
- Complement: 4 officers, 32 enlisted
- Armament: 6 × 50 cm (19.7 in) torpedo tubes (four bow, two stern); 12-16 torpedoes; 1 × 10.5 cm (4.1 in) SK L/45 deck gun

Service record
- Part of: IV Flotilla; Unknown start – 11 November 1918
- Commanders: Kptlt. Heinrich Metzger; 21 August – 11 November 1918
- Operations: None
- Victories: None

SM U-163 (Note: "SM" stands for "Seiner Majestät" (English: His Majesty's) and combined with the U for Unterseeboot would be translated as His Majesty's Submarine.) was one of the 329 submarines serving in the Imperial German Navy in World War I. U-163 was engaged in the naval warfare and took part in the First Battle of the Atlantic.

== Design ==
Type U 93 submarines were preceded by the shorter Type U 87 submarines. U-163 had a displacement of 821 tonnes (808 long tons) when at the surface and 1,002 tonnes (986 long tons) while submerged. She had a total length of 71.55 metres (234 ft 9 in), a pressure hull length of 56.05 m (183 ft 11 in), a beam of 6.30 m (20 ft 8 in), a height of 8.25 m (27 ft 1 in), and a draught of 3.88 m (12 ft 9 in). The submarine was powered by two 2,400 metric horsepower (1,800 kW; 2,400 shp) engines for use while surfaced, and two 1,230 metric horsepower (900 kW; 1,210 shp) engines for use while submerged. She had two propeller shafts and two 1.70 m (5 ft 7 in) propellers. She was capable of operating at depths of up to 50 metres (160 ft).

The submarine had a maximum surface speed of 16.2 knots (30.0 km/h; 18.6 mph) and a maximum submerged speed of 8.2 knots (15.2 km/h; 9.4 mph). When submerged, she could operate for 50 nautical miles (93 km; 58 mi) at 5 knots (9.3 km/h; 5.8 mph); when surfaced, she could travel 8,500 nautical miles (15,700 km; 9,800 mi) at 8 knots (15 km/h; 9.2 mph). U-163 was fitted with six 50 centimetres (20 in) torpedo tubes (four at the bow and two at the stern), twelve to sixteen torpedoes, and one 10.5 cm (4.1 in) SK L/45 deck gun. She had a complement of thirty-six (thirty-two crew members and four officers).

== Bibliography ==
- Gröner, Erich; Jung, Dieter; Maass, Martin (1991). U-boats and Mine Warfare Vessels. German Warships 1815–1945. Vol. 2. Translated by Thomas, Keith; Magowan, Rachel. London: Conway Maritime Press. ISBN 0-85177-593-4.
