= SM U-114 =

German Submarine used in WW1

History

German Empire
- Name: U-114
- Ordered: 5 May 1916
- Builder: Germaniawerft, Kiel
- Yard number: 283
- Launched: 27 November 1917
- Commissioned: 19 June 1918
- Fate: Surrendered to Italy 26 November 1918, Broken up 1919

General characteristics
- Class & type: Type U 93 submarine
- Displacement: 798 t (785 long tons) surfaced; 996 t (980 long tons) submerged
- Length: 71.55 m (234 ft 9 in) (o/a); 56.05 m (183 ft 11 in) (pressure hull)
- Beam: 6.30 m (20 ft 8 in) (o/a); 4.15 m (13 ft 7 in) (pressure hull)
- Height: 8.25 m (27 ft 1 in)
- Draught: 3.76 m (12 ft 4 in)
- Installed power: 2 × 2,300 PS (1,692 kW; 2,269 shp) surfaced; 2 × 1,200 PS (883 kW; 1,184 shp) submerged
- Propulsion: 2 shafts, 2 × 1.70 m (5 ft 7 in) propellers
- Speed: 16.4 knots (30.4 km/h; 18.9 mph) surfaced; 8.4 knots (15.6 km/h; 9.7 mph) submerged
- Range: 8,300 nmi (15,400 km; 9,600 mi) at 8 knots (15 km/h; 9.2 mph) surfaced; 50 nmi (93 km; 58 mi) at 5 knots (9.3 km/h; 5.8 mph) submerged
- Test depth: 50 m (164 ft 1 in)
- Complement: 4 officers, 32 enlisted
- Armament: 6 × 50 cm (19.7 in) torpedo tubes (four bow, two stern); 12-16 torpedoes; 1 × 10.5 cm (4.1 in) SK L/45 deck gun

Service record
- Part of: IV Flotilla; Unknown start – 11 November 1918
- Commanders: Kptlt. Martin Wahn; 19 June 1918 – 11 November 1918
- Operations: 1 patrol
- Victories: None

SM U-114 (Note: "SM" stands for "Seiner Majestät" (English: His Majesty's) and combined with the U for Unterseeboot would be translated as His Majesty's Submarine.) was one of the 329 submarines serving in the Imperial German Navy in World War I. U-114 was engaged in the naval warfare and took part in the First Battle of the Atlantic.

== Design ==
Type U 93 submarines were preceded by the shorter Type U 87 submarines. U-114 had a displacement of 798 tonnes (785 long tons) when at the surface and 1,000 tonnes (980 long tons) while submerged. She had a total length of 71.55 m (234 ft 9 in), a pressure hull length of 56.05 m (183 ft 11 in), a beam of 6.30 m (20 ft 8 in), a height of 8.25 m (27 ft 1 in), and a draught of 3.76 m (12 ft 4 in). The submarine was powered by two 2,300 metric horsepower (1,700 kW; 2,300 shp) engines for use while surfaced, and two 1,200 metric horsepower (880 kW; 1,200 shp) engines for use while submerged. She had two propeller shafts and two 1.70 m (5 ft 7 in) propellers. She was capable of operating at depths of up to 50 metres (160 ft).

The submarine had a maximum surface speed of 16.4 knots (30.4 km/h; 18.9 mph) and a maximum submerged speed of 8.4 knots (15.6 km/h; 9.7 mph). When submerged, she could operate for 50 nautical miles (93 km; 58 mi) at 5 knots (9.3 km/h; 5.8 mph); when surfaced, she could travel 9,280 nautical miles (17,190 km; 10,680 mi) at 8 knots (15 km/h; 9.2 mph). U-114 was fitted with six 50 centimetres (20 in) torpedo tubes (four at the bow and two at the stern), twelve to sixteen torpedoes, and one 10.5 cm (4.1 in) SK L/45 deck gun. She had a complement of thirty-six (thirty-two crew members and four officers).

== Bibliography ==
- Gröner, Erich; Jung, Dieter; Maass, Martin (1991). U-boats and Mine Warfare Vessels. German Warships 1815–1945. Vol. 2. Translated by Thomas, Keith; Magowan, Rachel. London: Conway Maritime Press. ISBN 0-85177-593-4.
