= SM U-106 =

History

German Empire
- Name: U-106
- Ordered: 5 May 1916
- Builder: Germaniawerft, Kiel
- Yard number: 275
- Launched: 12 June 1917
- Commissioned: 28 July 1917
- Fate: Sunk by mines 7 October 1917

General characteristics
- Class & type: Type U 93 submarine
- Displacement: 798 t (785 long tons) surfaced; 1,000 t (980 long tons) submerged
- Length: 71.55 m (234 ft 9 in) (o/a); 56.05 m (183 ft 11 in) (pressure hull)
- Beam: 6.30 m (20 ft 8 in) (o/a); 4.15 m (13 ft 7 in) (pressure hull)
- Height: 8.25 m (27 ft 1 in)
- Draught: 3.90 m (12 ft 10 in)
- Installed power: 2 × 2,400 PS (1,765 kW; 2,367 shp) surfaced; 2 × 1,200 PS (883 kW; 1,184 shp) submerged
- Propulsion: 2 shafts, 2 × 1.70 m (5 ft 7 in) propellers
- Speed: 16.4 knots (30.4 km/h; 18.9 mph) surfaced; 8.4 knots (15.6 km/h; 9.7 mph) submerged
- Range: 9,280 nmi (17,190 km; 10,680 mi) at 8 knots (15 km/h; 9.2 mph) surfaced; 50 nmi (93 km; 58 mi) at 5 knots (9.3 km/h; 5.8 mph) submerged
- Test depth: 50 m (164 ft 1 in)
- Complement: 4 officers, 32 enlisted
- Armament: 6 × 50 cm (19.7 in) torpedo tubes (four bow, two stern); 12-16 torpedoes; 1 × 10.5 cm (4.1 in) SK L/45 deck gun; 1 × 8.8 cm (3.5 in) SK L/30 deck gun

Service record
- Part of: IV Flotilla; 2 September – 7 October 1917
- Commanders: Kptlt. Hans Hufnagel; 28 July – 7 October 1917
- Operations: 1 patrol
- Victories: 1 warship sunk (957 tons); 1 merchant ship damaged (5,867 GRT)

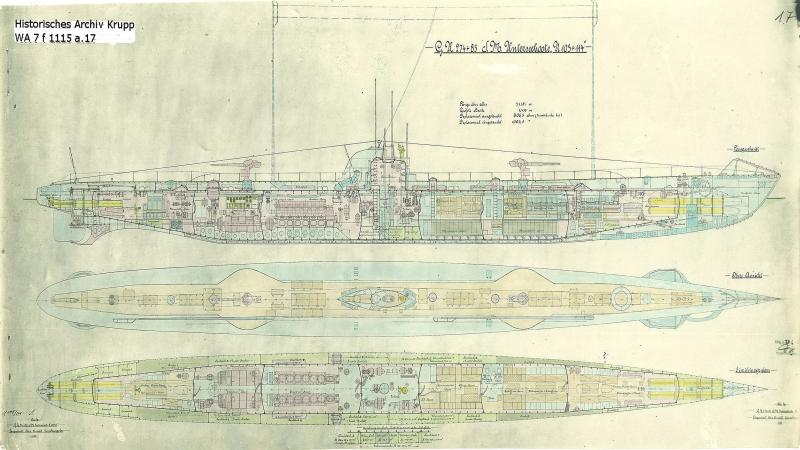
Construction schematic of the German WW I era submarine U-106

SM U-106 was one of the 329 submarines serving in the Imperial German Navy in World War I. U-106 was commissioned on 28 July 1917, under the command of Kapitänleutnant Hans Hufnagel, and participated in one wartime patrol starting on 2 September 1917. On 18 September 1917, during the First Battle of the Atlantic, U-106 was credited with the sinking of HMS Contest, an Acasta class destroyer, and damaging "City of Lincoln", a 5,867 GRT steamer, in the Western Approaches. She was lost off Terschelling after striking a mine on 7 October 1917.

== Design ==
Type U 93 submarines were preceded by the shorter Type U 87 submarines. U-106 had a displacement of 798 tonnes (785 long tons) when at the surface and 1,000 tonnes (980 long tons) while submerged. She had a total length of 71.55 m (234 ft 9 in), a pressure hull length of 56.05 m (183 ft 11 in), a beam of 6.30 m (20 ft 8 in), a height of 8.25 m (27 ft 1 in), and a draught of 3.90 m (12 ft 10 in). The submarine was powered by two 2,400 metric horsepower (1,800 kW; 2,400 shp) engines for use while surfaced, and two 1,200 metric horsepower (880 kW; 1,200 shp) engines for use while submerged. The boat had two propeller shafts and two 1.70 m (5 ft 7 in) propellers. The boat was capable of operating at depths of up to 50 metres (160 ft).

The submarine had a maximum surface speed of 16.4 knots (30.4 km/h; 18.9 mph) and a maximum submerged speed of 8.4 knots (15.6 km/h; 9.7 mph). When submerged, she could operate for 50 nautical miles (93 km; 58 mi) at 5 knots (9.3 km/h; 5.8 mph); when surfaced, she could travel 9,280 nautical miles (17,190 km; 10,680 mi) at 8 knots (15 km/h; 9.2 mph). U-106 was fitted with six 50 centimetres (20 in) torpedo tubes (four at the bow and two at the stern), twelve to sixteen torpedoes, one 10.5 cm (4.1 in) SK L/45, and one 8.8 cm (3.5 in) SK L/30 deck gun. She had a complement of thirty-six (thirty-two crew members and four officers).

== Wreck ==
In 2009 the Royal Netherlands Navy found the wreckage of the ship north of Terschelling, while charting sea-routes. The news was made public in March 2011, after the ship's identity had been confirmed by German authorities and the crewmembers' families had been informed. The ship will stay in place as a wargrave.

== Summary of raiding history ==
Date	Name	Nationality	Tonnage (Note: Merchant ship tonnages are in gross register tons. Military vessels are listed by tons displacement.)	Fate
18 September 1917	HMS Contest	Royal Navy	957	Sunk
18 September 1917	City of Lincoln	United Kingdom	5,867	Damaged

== Bibliography ==
- Gröner, Erich; Jung, Dieter; Maass, Martin (1991). U-boats and Mine Warfare Vessels. German Warships 1815–1945. Vol. 2. Translated by Thomas, Keith; Magowan, Rachel. London: Conway Maritime Press. ISBN 0-85177-593-4.
