= SM U-108 =

Coordinates: 50°53′N 1°31′E

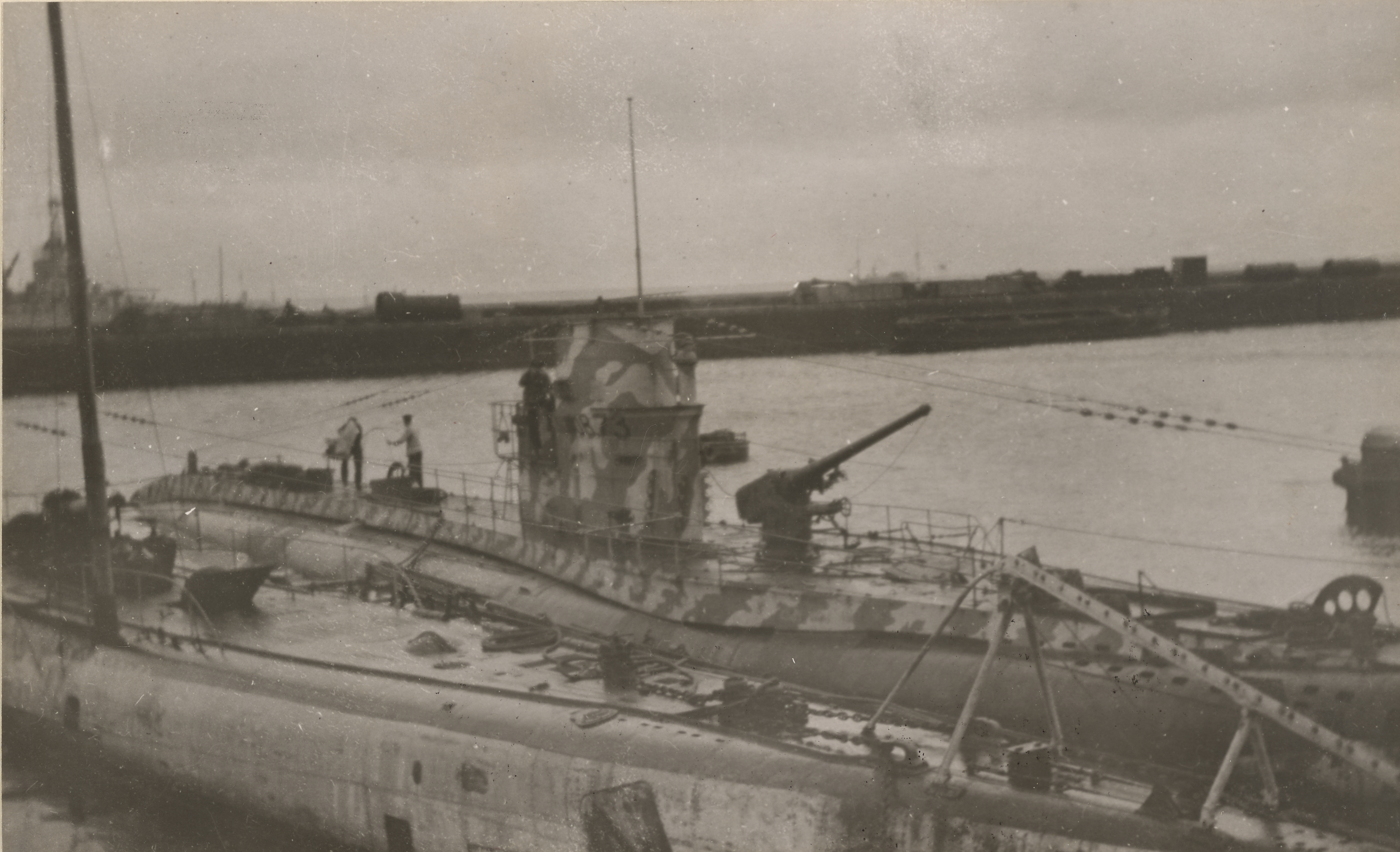
- U-boats 108 and U-C56, in Brest docks, 1918. Note six-inch rifle on bow of U-108

History

German Empire
- Name: U-108
- Ordered: 5 May 1916
- Builder: Germaniawerft, Kiel
- Yard number: 277
- Launched: 11 October 1917
- Commissioned: 5 December 1917
- Fate: Surrendered to France, 20 November 1918

France
- Name: Léon Mignot
- Namesake: Léon Mignot
- Fate: Broken up, 1935

General characteristics
- Class & type: Type U 93 submarine
- Displacement: 798 t (785 long tons) surfaced; 1,000 t (980 long tons) submerged
- Length: 71.55 m (234 ft 9 in) (o/a); 56.05 m (183 ft 11 in) (pressure hull)
- Beam: 6.30 m (20 ft 8 in) (o/a); 4.15 m (13 ft 7 in) (pressure hull)
- Height: 8.25 m (27 ft 1 in)
- Draught: 3.90 m (12 ft 10 in)
- Installed power: 2 × 2,400 PS (1,765 kW; 2,367 shp) surfaced; 2 × 1,200 PS (883 kW; 1,184 shp) submerged
- Propulsion: 2 shafts; 2 × 1.70 m (5 ft 7 in) propellers
- Speed: 16.4 knots (30.4 km/h; 18.9 mph) surfaced; 8.4 knots (15.6 km/h; 9.7 mph) submerged
- Range: 9,280 nmi (17,190 km; 10,680 mi) at 8 knots (15 km/h; 9.2 mph) surfaced; 50 nmi (93 km; 58 mi) at 5 knots (9.3 km/h; 5.8 mph) submerged
- Test depth: 50 m (160 ft)
- Complement: 4 officers, 32 enlisted
- Armament: 6 × 50 cm (19.7 in) torpedo tubes (four bow, two stern); 12-16 torpedoes; 1 × 10.5 cm (4.1 in) SK L/45 deck gun; 1 × 8.8 cm (3.5 in) SK L/30 deck gun

Service record
- Part of: IV Flotilla; Unknown start – 11 November 1918
- Commanders: K.Kapt. Martin Nitzsche; 5 December 1917 – 11 November 1918
- Operations: 3 patrols
- Victories: 1 merchant ship sunk (7,484 GRT)

SM U-108 (Note: "SM" stands for "Seiner Majestät" (English: His Majesty's) and combined with the U for Unterseeboot would be translated as His Majesty's Submarine.) was a submarine in the Imperial German Navy in World War I, taking part in the First Battle of the Atlantic.

== Design ==
Type U 93 submarines were preceded by the shorter Type U 87 submarines. U-108 had a displacement of 798 tonnes (785 long tons) when at the surface and 1,000 tonnes (980 long tons) while submerged. She had a total length of 71.55 m (234 ft 9 in), a pressure hull length of 56.05 m (183 ft 11 in), a beam of 6.30 m (20 ft 8 in), a height of 8.25 m (27 ft 1 in), and a draught of 3.90 m (12 ft 10 in). The submarine was powered by two 2,400 metric horsepower (1,800 kW; 2,400 shp) engines for use while surfaced, and two 1,200 metric horsepower (880 kW; 1,200 shp) engines for use while submerged. She had two propeller shafts and two 1.70 m (5 ft 7 in) propellers. The boat was capable of operating at depths of up to 50 metres (160 ft).

The submarine had a maximum surface speed of 16.4 knots (30.4 km/h; 18.9 mph) and a maximum submerged speed of 8.4 knots (15.6 km/h; 9.7 mph). When submerged, she could operate for 50 nautical miles (93 km; 58 mi) at 5 knots (9.3 km/h; 5.8 mph); when surfaced, she could travel 9,280 nautical miles (17,190 km; 10,680 mi) at 8 knots (15 km/h; 9.2 mph). U-108 was fitted with six 50 centimetres (20 in) torpedo tubes (four at the bow and two at the stern), twelve to sixteen torpedoes, one 10.5 cm (4.1 in) SK L/45 deck gun, and one 8.8 cm (3.5 in) SK L/30 deck gun. She had a complement of thirty-six (thirty-two crew members and four officers).

== Service history ==
The building contract was confirmed 5 May 1916, and was awarded to Germaniawerft, Kiel. A Type 93 boat, she was launched 11 October 1917 and commissioned 5 December. She was under the command of Korvettenkapitän Martin Nitzsche.

On 20 November 1918, U-108 was surrendered to France where she was commissioned as Léon Mignot and served until 24 July 1935.

== Summary of raiding history ==
| Date | Name | Nationality | Tonnage (Note: Tonnages are in gross register tons) | Fate |
|---|---|---|---|---|
| 15 July 1918 | Barunga | United Kingdom | 7,484 | Sunk |

== Bibliography ==
- Gröner, Erich; Jung, Dieter; Maass, Martin (1991). U-boats and Mine Warfare Vessels. German Warships 1815–1945. Vol. 2. Translated by Thomas, Keith; Magowan, Rachel. London: Conway Maritime Press. ISBN 0-85177-593-4.
