= Type U 93 submarine =

German WWI submarine class

Class overview
- Builders: Germaniawerft, Kiel and Kaiserliche Werft Danzig
- Operators: Imperial German Navy
- Preceded by: Type U 87
- Succeeded by: Type Large MS
- Completed: 24
- Lost: 6

General characteristics
- Displacement: 838 t (825 long tons) (surfaced); 1,000 t (980 long tons) (submerged); 1,270 t (1,250 long tons) (total)
- Length: 71.55 m (234 ft 9 in) (o/a); 56.05 m (183 ft 11 in) (pressure hull)
- Beam: 6.20 m (20 ft 4 in) (o/a); 4.18 m (13 ft 9 in) (pressure hull)
- Draught: 3.94 m (12 ft 11 in)
- Propulsion: 2,400 PS (1,800 kW; 2,400 shp) (surfaced); 1,200 PS (880 kW; 1,200 shp) (submerged)
- Speed: 16.8 knots (31.1 km/h; 19.3 mph) (surfaced); 9.1 knots (16.9 km/h; 10.5 mph) (submerged)
- Range: 11,280 nmi (20,890 km; 12,980 mi) at 8 knots (15 km/h; 9.2 mph) (surfaced); 56 nmi (104 km; 64 mi) at 5 knots (9.3 km/h; 5.8 mph) (submerged)
- Test depth: 50 m (160 ft)
- Complement: 39 men
- Armament: 6 torpedo tubes (four bow, two stern); 16 torpedoes; 1 10.5 cm (4.1 in) SK L/45 deck gun with 140 rounds; 1 8.8 cm (3.5 in) SK L/30 deck gun

Type 93 was a class of U-boats built during World War I by the Kaiserliche Marine.

== Design ==
Type 93 U-boats carried 16 torpedoes and had various arrangements of deck guns. As with the type 81 and 87, some had only one 8.8 cm (3.5 in) SK L/30 deck gun while others had a single 10.5 cm (4.1 in) SK L/45 gun and some were initially equipped with both. In 1917 some of the boats were refitted with a single 10.5 cm gun and 220 rounds.

These boats carried a crew of 39 and had excellent seagoing abilities with a cruising range of around 9,000 nautical miles (17,000 km; 10,000 mi). Many arrangements from the Type 81, 87 and 93 were also seen on World War II Type IX U-boats when their design work took place 20 years later.

Compared to the previous type 87, the 93s were 5.75 metres (18 ft 10 in) longer, while the pressure hull was 5.98 m (19 ft 7 in) longer. They were 1.2 knots (2.2 km/h; 1.4 mph) faster on the surface, and unchanged at 8.6 knots (15.9 km/h; 9.9 mph) submerged. Range decreased 2,360 nmi (4,370 km; 2,720 mi) at 8 knots (15 km/h; 9.2 mph), to 9,020 nautical miles. They still carried 16 torpedoes with four bow and two stern tubes. Crew size was increased by 3 to 39.

Compared to the following type Large MS, the 93s were 11.95 m (39 ft 2 in)shorter, and 610 tonnes (600 long tons) lighter. Their range was 980 nmi shorter, and speed was .2 knots (0.37 km/h; 0.23 mph) slower on the surface but .5 knots (0.93 km/h; 0.58 mph) faster submerged. The Large MS was intended for the deepest waters and the increased size made it more comfortable and very seaworthy.

== Service history ==
Type 93 boats were responsible for sinking 3.201% of all allied shipping sunk during the war, taking a total of 412,419 combined tons. They also damaged 71,202 combined tons.

Boat	Sunk	Damaged	Total
U-93	87,872	12,628	100,500
U-94	61,881	19,326	81,207
U-95	38,014	5,862	43,876
U-96	95,253	16,220	111,473
U-97	2,089	4,785	6,874
U-98	1,750	5,430	7,180
U-105	55,834	0	55,834
U-106	957	5,867	6,824
U-107	24,663	1,084	25,747
U-108	7,484	0	7,484
U-109	0	0	0
U-110	26,963	0	26,963
U-111	3,011	0	3,011
U-112	0	0	0
U-113	6,648	0	6,648
U-114	0	0	0
U-160	0	0	0
U-161	0	0	0
U-162	0	0	0
U-163	0	0	0
U-164	0	0	0
U-165	0	0	0
U-166	0	0	0
U-167	0	0	0
Total	412,419	71,202	483,621

== List of Type 93 submarines ==
There were 24 Type 93 submarines commissioned into the Kaiserliche Marine.

- SM U-93
- SM U-94
- SM U-95
- SM U-96
- SM U-97
- SM U-98
- SM U-105
- SM U-106
- SM U-107
- SM U-108
- SM U-109
- SM U-110
- SM U-111
- SM U-112
- SM U-113
- SM U-114
- SM U-160
- SM U-161
- SM U-162
- SM U-163
- SM U-164
- SM U-165
- SM U-166
- SM U-167

By the end of World War I, 375 U-boats of 33 separate classes belonging to 7 general types had been commissioned. More boats were finished after the war and either destroyed or awarded to victorious nations.

== Bibliography ==
- Gröner, Erich; Jung, Dieter; Maass, Martin (1991). German Warships 1815–1945, U-boats and Mine Warfare Vessels. Vol. 2. Translated by Thomas, Keith; Magowan, Rachel. London: Conway Maritime Press. ISBN 0-85177-593-4.
