= Naval warfare in World War I =

Naval warfare of World War I
- Part of World War I
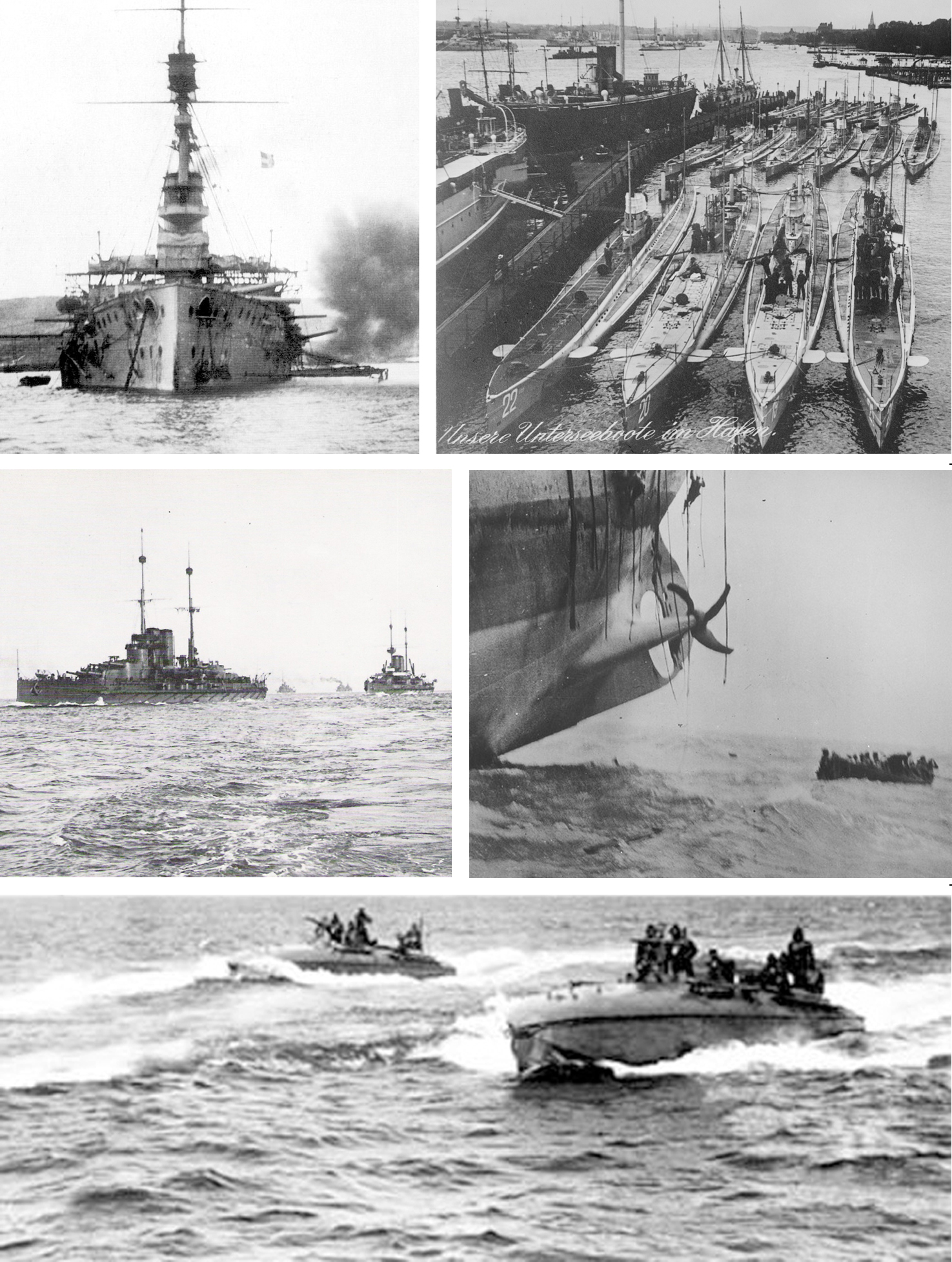
- Clockwise from top left: the Cornwallis fires in Suvla Bay, Dardanelles 1915; U-boats moored in Kiel, around 1914; a lifeboat departs from an Allied ship hit by a German torpedo, around 1917; two Italian MAS in practice in the final stages of the war; manoeuvres of the Austro-Hungarian fleet with the Tegetthoff in the foreground
Date	July 28, 1914 – November 11, 1918
Location	Atlantic Ocean, Pacific Ocean, Indian Ocean, North Sea, Mediterranean Sea, Black Sea, Baltic Sea and Persian Gulf
Result	Allied victory

Belligerents
Allied Powers: United Kingdom: Australia; New Zealand; Canada; India; France; Italy (from 1915); United States (from 1917); Russia (until 1917); Japan; Portugal (from 1916); Greece (from 1917); Romania (from 1916); Belgium; Montenegro; Brazil (from 1917); Siam (from 1917)	Central Powers: Germany; Austria-Hungary; Ottoman Empire; Bulgaria (from 1915)

Commanders and leaders
(United Kingdom of Great Britain and Ireland) George V (United Kingdom of Great Britain and Ireland) David Lloyd George (United Kingdom of Great Britain and Ireland) John Fisher (United Kingdom of Great Britain and Ireland) Henry Jackson (United Kingdom of Great Britain and Ireland) John Jellicoe (United Kingdom of Great Britain and Ireland) Rosslyn Wemyss (Australia) George Edwin Patey (Australia) William Pakenham (Australia) Arthur Leveson (Australia) Lionel Halsey (French Third Republic) Louis Pivet (French Third Republic) Charles Aubert (French Third Republic) Marie de Jonquieres (French Third Republic) Ferdinand de Bon (Kingdom of Italy) Luigi of Savoy-Aosta (United States Navy) William S. Benson (First Brazilian Republic) Pedro de Frontin (Russian Empire) Nikolai Essen (Russian Empire) Vasily Kanin (Russian Empire) Adrian Nepenin (Russian Empire) Andrei Eberhardt (Russian Empire) Alexander Kolchak (Empire of Japan) Ijuin Gorō (Kingdom of Greece) Pavlos Kountouriotis	(German Empire) Hugo von Pohl (German Empire) Gustav Bachmann (German Empire) Henning von Holtzendorff (German Empire) Reinhard Scheer (German Empire) Maximilian von Spee † (Austria-Hungary) Anton Haus (Austria-Hungary) Maximilian Njegovan (Austria-Hungary) Miklós Horthy (Ottoman Empire) Wilhelm Souchon (Ottoman Empire) Hubert von Rebeur

Naval warfare in World War I was mainly characterised by blockade. The Allied powers, with their larger fleets and surrounding position, largely succeeded in their blockade of Germany and the other Central Powers, whilst the efforts of the Central Powers to break that blockade, or to establish an effective counter blockade with submarines and commerce raiders, were eventually unsuccessful. Major fleet actions were extremely rare and proved less decisive.

== Prelude ==
In the early 20th century, Britain and Germany engaged in a protracted naval arms race centred on the construction of dreadnought-type battleships. Germany’s effort to assemble a fleet capable of equalling the United Kingdom’s, then the world’s preeminent sea power and an island state dependent on maritime commerce, has frequently been identified as a principal source of the hostility that drew Britain into World War I. German leaders sought a navy commensurate with their nation’s military and economic stature to secure overseas trade routes and colonial holdings independently of British goodwill. Yet the prospect of such a fleet posed an inherent challenge to British naval dominance and the security of its global trade and empire.

After the First Moroccan Crisis (March 1905–May 1906) over Morocco’s colonial status, the major European powers entered a naval arms race that would define early twentieth-century geopolitics.

This competition drew heavily on the ideas of Captain Alfred Thayer Mahan, an American naval officer and maritime historian who, in 1887, published The Influence of Sea Power upon History. In it, Mahan contended that control of the world’s sea lanes had been the decisive factor behind the prosperity of maritime states. He demonstrated how Rome and Britain had attained global preeminence through naval supremacy, while powers such as Carthage under Hannibal and Napoleonic France had faltered for lack of a dominant fleet. Mahan argued that any nation aspiring to economic growth and imperial influence needed to replicate Britain’s model of concentrated sea-power and influence.

=== Naval arms race ===
Mahan's thesis was highly influential and led to an explosion of new naval construction worldwide. The US Congress immediately ordered the building of three battleships (with a fourth, USS Iowa, to be built two years later). Japan, whose British-trained navy wiped out the Russian fleet at the Battle of Tsushima, helped to reinforce the concept of naval power as the dominant factor in conflict. However, the book made the most impact in Germany. The German Kaiser, Wilhelm II, had been much impressed by the Royal Navy, when he visited his grandmother, Queen Victoria. His mother said that "Wilhelm's one idea is to have a Navy which shall be larger and stronger than the British navy". In 1898 came the first German Fleet Act, two years later a second doubled the number of ships to be built, to 19 battleships and 23 cruisers in the next 20 years. In another decade, Germany would go from a naval ranking lower than Austria to having the second largest battle fleet in the world. For the first time since Trafalgar, Britain had an aggressive and truly dangerous rival to worry about.

Mahan wrote in his book that not only world peace or the empire, but Britain's very survival depended on the Royal Navy ruling the waves. The Cambridge 1895 Latin essay prize was called "Britannici maris", or "British Sea Power". So when the great naval review of June 1897 for the Queen's diamond jubilee took place, it was in an atmosphere of unease and uncertainty. The question everyone wanted to know the answer to was how Britain was going to stay ahead. But Mahan could not give any answers. The man who thought he could was Jackie Fisher, commander in chief of the Mediterranean Fleet. He believed there were "Five strategic keys to the empire and world economic system: Gibraltar, Alexandria and Suez, Singapore, the Cape of Good Hope, and the Straits of Dover." His job was to keep hold of all of them.

=== Fisher's reforms ===
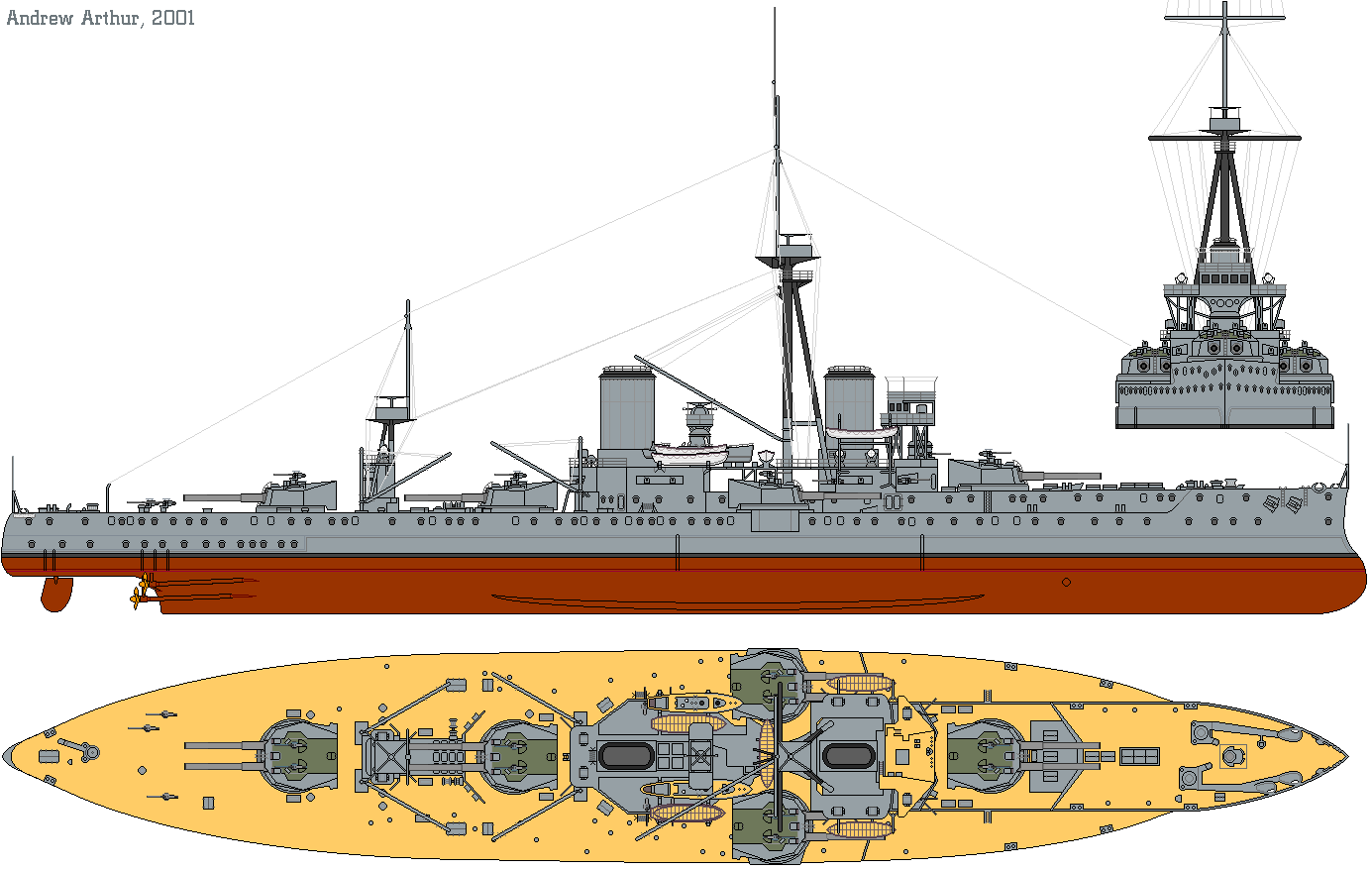
Design of the revolutionary battleship HMS Dreadnought

When he became First Sea Lord, Fisher began drawing up plans for a naval war against Germany. "Germany keeps her whole fleet always concentrated within a few hours of England," he wrote to the Prince of Wales in 1906. "We must therefore keep a fleet twice as powerful within a few hours of Germany." He therefore concentrated the bulk of the fleet in home waters, with a secondary concentration in the Mediterranean Fleet. He also had dozens of obsolete warships scrapped or hulked. The resources thus saved were directed to new designs of submarines, destroyers, light cruisers, battlecruisers and dreadnoughts. Fisher proclaimed, "We shall have ten Dreadnoughts at sea before a single foreign Dreadnought is launched, and we have thirty percent more cruisers than Germany and France put together."

=== German response ===
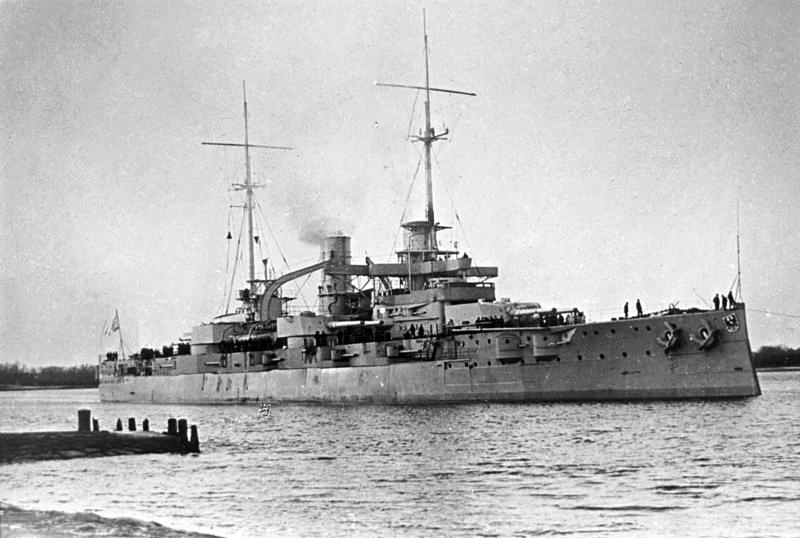
SMS Rheinland, a Nassau-class battleship, Germany's first response to Dreadnought

Admiral Alfred Tirpitz had often visited Portsmouth as a naval cadet and admired and envied the Royal Navy. Like the Kaiser, Tirpitz believed Germany's future dominant role in the world depended on a powerful navy. He demanded large numbers of battleships. Even when Dreadnought was launched, making his previously constructed 15 battleships obsolete, he believed that eventually Germany's technological and industrial might would allow Germany to out-build Britain ship for ship. Using the threat of his own resignation he forced the Reichstag to build three dreadnoughts and a battle cruiser. He also put aside money for a future submarine branch. At the rate that Tirpitz insisted upon, Germany would have thirteen in 1912, to Britain's 16.

When this was leaked out to the British people in spring 1909, there was public outcry. The people demanded eight new battleships instead of the four the government had planned for that year. As Winston Churchill put it, "The Admiralty had demanded six ships; the economists offered four; and we finally compromised on eight." Tirpitz had no option but to consider Britain's new dreadnought-building program as a direct threat to Germany. He had to respond, raising the stakes further. However, the commitment of funds to out-build the Germans meant Britain was abandoning any notion of a two-power standard for naval superiority. No amount of money would allow Britain to compete with Germany and Russia or the US, or even Italy. Thus a new policy, of dominance over the world's second leading sea power by a 60% margin, went into effect. Fisher's staff had been getting increasingly annoyed by the way he refused to tolerate any difference in opinion, and the eight dreadnought demand had been the last straw. Thus on January 25, 1910, Fisher left the Admiralty. Shortly after Fisher's resignation, Churchill became First Lord of the Admiralty. Under him, the race would continue; indeed Lloyd George nearly resigned when Churchill presented him with the naval budget of 1914 of 50 million pounds.

By the start of the war Germany had an impressive fleet both of capital ships and submarines. Other nations had smaller fleets, generally with a lower proportion of battleships and a larger proportion of smaller ships like destroyers and submarines. France, Italy, Russia, Austria-Hungary, Japan, and the United States all had modern fleets with at least some dreadnoughts and submarines.

== Naval technology ==
Naval technology in World War I was dominated by the newly created dreadnought battleship, with several large turrets of equally sized big guns. British ships generally had larger guns and were equipped and manned for quicker fire than their German counterparts, which usually had better optical equipment and rangefinding, and were much better compartmentalized and able to deal with damage. The British also generally had poor propellant handling procedures, a point that was to have disastrous consequences for the British battlecruisers at Jutland.

Many of the individual parts and systems of ships had recently improved dramatically. Oil was just being introduced to replace coal, containing as much as 40% more energy per volume, extending range and further improving internal layout. Another advantage was that oil gave off considerably less smoke, making visual detection more difficult. This was generally mitigated by the small number of ships so equipped, generally operating in concert with coal-fired ships.

The introduction of the turbine led to much higher performance, as well as freeing up room and thereby allowing for improved layouts. Whereas pre-dreadnought battleships were generally limited to 12–17 kn (14–20 mph; 22–31 km/h), modern ships were capable of at least 20 kn (23 mph; 37 km/h), and in the latest British classes, 24 kn (28 mph; 44 km/h). The introduction of the gyroscope and centralized fire control, the "director" in British terms, led to dramatic improvements in gunnery. Ships built before 1900 had effective ranges of around 2,000 yd (1,800 m), whereas the first "new" ships were good to at least 8,000 yd (7,300 m), and modern designs to over 10,000 yd (9,100 m).

A new class of ship, the battlecruiser, appeared just before the war. The British designs were armed like their heavier dreadnought cousins, but deliberately lacked armor to save weight in order to improve speed, so that these ships would be able to outgun anything smaller than themselves, and get away from anything larger. The German designs opted to trade slightly smaller main armament (11 or 12 inch guns compared to 12 or 13.5 inch guns in their British rivals) for speed, while keeping relatively heavy armor. They could operate independently in the open ocean where their speed gave them room to maneuver, or, alternately, as a fast scouting force in front of a larger fleet action.

The torpedo boat caused considerable worry for many naval planners. In theory, a large number of these inexpensive ships could attack in masses and overwhelm a dreadnought force. This led to the introduction of ships dedicated to keeping them away from the fleets, the "torpedo boat destroyers", or simply, "destroyers". Although the mass raid continued to be a possibility, another solution was found in the form of the submarine, increasingly in use.

The submarine could escape blockades that prevent the use of surface vessels. It could approach underwater, safe from the guns of both the capital ships and the destroyers (although not for long), and fire a torpedo salvo as deadly as a torpedo boat's. Limited range and speed, especially underwater, made these weapons difficult to use tactically. Submarines were generally more effective in attacking poorly defended merchant ships (in which case surfaced attacks through deck guns were favoured prior to 1917) than in fighting surface warships, though several small-to-medium British warships were lost to torpedoes launched from German U-boats.

Radio was in early use, with naval ships commonly equipped with radio telegraph, and merchant ships less so. Sonar was in its infancy by the end of the war. Aviation was primarily focused on reconnaissance, with the aircraft carrier being developed over the course of the war, and bomber aircraft capable of lifting only relatively light loads.

Naval mines were also increasingly well developed. Defensive mines along coasts made it much more difficult for capital ships to get close enough to conduct coastal bombardment or support attacks. The first battleship sinking in the war — that of HMS Audacious — was the result of her striking a naval mine on 27 October 1914. Suitably placed mines also served to restrict the freedom of movement of submarines.

== List of naval engagements ==
1914

- Battle of Antivari
- First Battle of Heligoland Bight
- Battle of Penang
- Battle of Coronel
- Battle of the Falkland Islands

1915

- Battle of Dogger Bank (1915)
- Gallipoli Campaign
- Battle of Más a Tierra

1916

- Battle of Jutland
- Battle of Dogger Bank (1916)

1917

- Second Battle of Heligoland Bight
- Battle of Moon Sound

1918

- Battle of Imbros

== Theaters ==
=== North Sea ===
The North Sea was the main theater of the war for surface action. The British Grand Fleet took position against the German High Seas Fleet. Britain's larger fleet could maintain a blockade of Germany, cutting it off from overseas trade and resources. Germany's fleet remained mostly in harbor behind their screen of mines, occasionally attempting to lure the British fleet into battle (one of such attempts was the bombardment of Yarmouth and Lowestoft) in the hopes of weakening them enough to break the blockade or allow the High Seas Fleet to attack British shipping and trade. Britain strove to maintain the blockade and, if possible, to damage the German fleet enough to remove the threat to the islands and free the Grand Fleet for use elsewhere. In 1918 the U.S. Navy with British help laid the North Sea Mine Barrage designed to keep U-boats from slipping into the Atlantic.

Major battles included those at Heligoland Bight (in 1914 and again in 1917), Dogger Bank (in 1915), and Jutland (1916). Though British tactical success remains a subject of historical debate, Britain accomplished its strategic objective of maintaining the blockade and keeping the main body of the High Seas Fleet in port for the vast majority of the war. The High Seas Fleet remained a threat as a fleet in being that forced Britain to retain a majority of its capital ships in the North Sea.

The set-piece battles and maneuvering have drawn historians' attention; however, it was the naval blockade of food and raw material imports into Germany which ultimately starved the German people and industries and contributed to Germany seeking the Armistice of 1918.

=== English Channel ===
Although the English Channel was of vital importance to the British Expeditionary Force (BEF) fighting in France, there were no big warships of the British Royal Navy in the channel. The primary threat to the British forces in the channel was the German High Seas Fleet based near Heligoland; the German fleet, if let out into the North Sea, could have destroyed any ship in the channel. The German High Seas Fleet could muster at least 13 dreadnoughts and many armored cruisers along with dozens of destroyers to attack the channel. The High Seas Fleet would be fighting against only six armored cruisers that were laid down in 1898–1899, far too old to accompany the big, fast dreadnoughts of the Grand Fleet based in Scapa Flow.

The U-boat threat in the channel, although real, was not a significant worry to the Admiralty because they regarded submarines as useless. Even the German high command regarded the U-boats as "experimental vessels". Although the channel was a major artery of the BEF, it was never attacked directly by the High Seas Fleet.

=== Atlantic ===
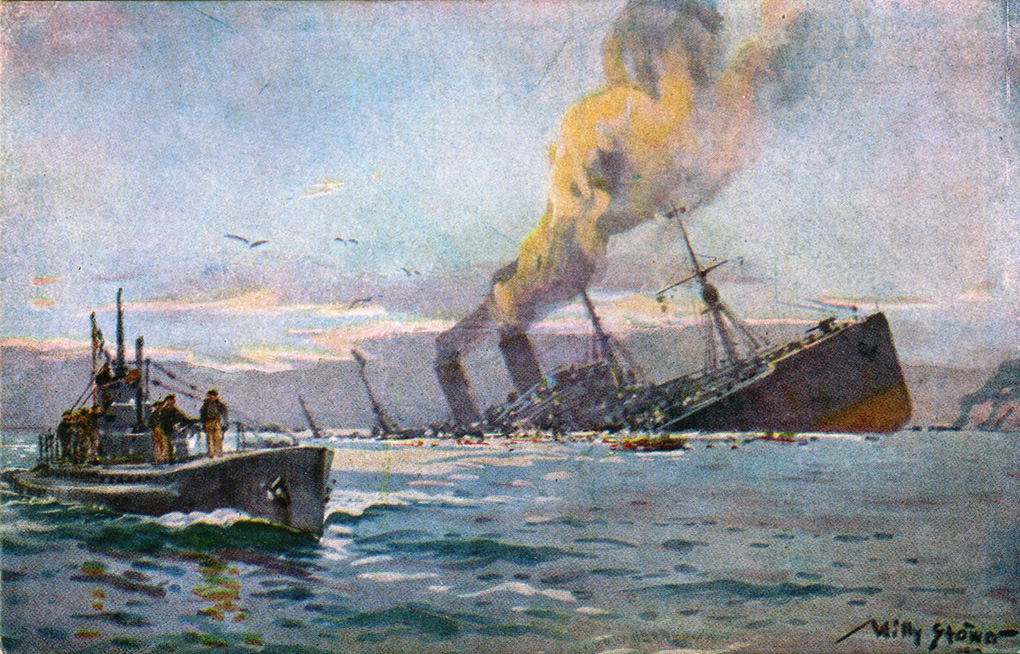
U-boat sinking a troopship, painting by Willy Stöwer

Britain's maritime blockade significantly restricted Germany's access to vital resources, contributing to severe economic and material shortages. Conversely, the United Kingdom, reliant on seaborne imports due to its island geography, faced strategic vulnerabilities. While German U-boats were generally ineffective against naval warships, they had considerable success in disrupting commercial shipping by targeting merchant vessels, thereby threatening Britain’s supply chains.

In 1915, Germany declared a naval blockade of Britain, to be enforced by its U-boats with unrestricted attacks on British ships. The U-boats sank hundreds of Allied merchant ships. However, submarines usually cannot rescue survivors, and may attack without giving warning or adequate time to abandon ship. Attacking civilian ships in this way violated the customary cruiser rules and resulted in many civilian deaths, especially when passenger ships were sunk. Furthermore, the U-boats also sank neutral ships in the blockade area, either intentionally or because identification was difficult from underwater.

This turned neutral opinion against the Central Powers, as countries like the U.S. and Brazil suffered casualties and losses to trade. Due to diplomatic and internal political pressure, the campaign was stopped that same year and instead for 1916 submarines attacked commerce under cruiser rules, to moderate success.

In early 1917, Germany declared unrestricted submarine warfare once more, including attacks without warning against all ships in the "war zone", including neutrals. This was a major cause of U.S. declaration of war on Germany.

While the U-boat campaign sank many merchant ships, it ultimately did not have a significant economic impact on Britain, failing to be a war-winning wonder weapon as German naval authorities had hoped, and British authorities feared. Far from being starved into submission, and in stark contrast to the experience of Germany, British civilian nutrition improved, with a rise in the average consumption of meat.

The U-boats were countered by a variety of measures - expanded shipbuilding and requisitioning of neutral and war ships, minefields to block U-boat access, defensive armaments on merchant ships (preventing the more effective U-boat tactic of surface attacks with deck guns) and eventually by grouping merchant ships into defended convoys. This was also assisted by the U.S. entry into the war and the increasing use of primitive sonar and aerial patrolling to detect and track submarines.

=== Mediterranean ===
Some limited sea combat took place between the navies of Austria-Hungary and Germany and the Allied navies of France, Britain, Italy and Japan.

=== Aegean ===
The navy of the Ottoman Empire only sortied out of the Dardanelles once late in the war during the Battle of Imbros, preferring to focus its operations in the Black Sea.

Unlike in the Atlantic, the Aegean saw large scale combat involving the French Navy, which provided most of the support vessels to aid in the invasion of Dardanelles and bombarded Athens in an attempt to secure Greek ascension to the Entente.

The main fleet action came in 1915 when the Triple Entente attempted to knock the Ottoman Empire out of the war entirely by capturing Constantinople and securing allied control over the Dardanelles. This operation turned into the Battle of Gallipoli and ended in defeat for the Triple Entente, Winston Churchill was subsequently force to resign as First Lord of the Admiralty as a result.

=== Black Sea ===
The Black Sea was mainly the domain of the Russians and the Ottoman Empire. The large Russian fleet was based in Sevastopol and it was led by two diligent commanders: Admiral Andrei Eberhardt (1914–1916) and Admiral Alexander Kolchak (1916–1917). The Ottoman fleet on the other hand was in a period of transition with many obsolete ships. It had been expecting to receive two powerful dreadnoughts fitting out in Britain, but the UK seized the completed Reşadiye and Sultân Osmân-ı Evvel with the outbreak of war with Germany and incorporated them into the Royal Navy.

The war in the Black Sea started when the Ottoman Fleet bombarded several Russian cities in October 1914. The most advanced ships in the Ottoman fleet consisted of two ships of the German Mediterranean Fleet: the powerful battlecruiser SMS Goeben and the speedy light cruiser SMS Breslau, both under the command of the skilled German Admiral Wilhelm Souchon. Goeben was a modern design, and with her well-drilled crew, could easily outfight or outrun any single ship in the Russian fleet. However, even though the opposing Russian battleships were slower, they were often able to amass in superior numbers to outgun Goeben, forcing her to flee.

A continual series of cat and mouse operations ensued for the first two years with both sides' admirals trying to capitalize on their particular tactical strengths in a surprise ambush. Numerous battles between the fleets were fought in the initial years, and Goeben and Russian units were damaged on several occasions.

The Russian Black Sea fleet was mainly used to support General Nikolai Yudenich in his Caucasus Campaign. However, the appearance of Goeben could dramatically change the situation, so all activities, even shore bombardment, had to be conducted by almost the entire Russian Black Sea Fleet, since a smaller force could fall victim to Goeben's speed and guns.

However, by 1916, this situation had swung in the Russians' favor – Goeben had been in constant service for the past two years. Due to a lack of facilities, the ship was not able to enter refit and began to suffer chronic engine breakdowns. Meanwhile, the Russian Navy had received the modern dreadnought Imperatritsa Mariya which although slower, would be able to stand up to and outfight Goeben. Although the two ships skirmished briefly, neither managed to capitalize on their tactical advantage and the battle ended with Goeben fleeing and Imperatritsa Mariya gamely trying to pursue. However, the Russian ship's arrival severely curtailed Goeben's activities and so by this time, the Russian fleet had nearly complete control of the sea, exacerbated by the addition of another dreadnought, Imperatritsa Ekaterina Velikaya. German and Turkish light forces, however, continued to raid and harass Russian shipping until the end of the war in the east.

After Admiral Kolchak took command in August 1916, he planned to invigorate the Russian Black Seas Fleet with a series of aggressive actions. The Russian fleet mined the exit from the Bosporus, preventing nearly all Ottoman ships from entering the Black Sea. Later that year, the naval approaches to Varna, Bulgaria, were also mined. The greatest loss suffered by the Russian Black Sea fleet was the destruction of Imperatritsa Mariya, which blew up in port on October 20 (October 7 o.s.) 1916, just one year after being commissioned. The subsequent investigation determined that the explosion was probably accidental, though sabotage could not be completely ruled out. The event shook Russian public opinion. The Russians continued work on two additional dreadnoughts under construction, and the balance of power remained in Russian hands until the collapse of Russian resistance in November 1917.

To support the Anglo-French attack on the Dardanelles, British, French and Australian submarines were sent into the Black Sea in the spring of 1915. A number of Turkish supply ships and warships were sunk, while several submarines were lost. The boats were withdrawn at the evacuation of the Dardanelles in January 1916.

The small Romanian Black Sea Fleet defended the port of Sulina throughout the second half of 1916, causing the sinking of one German submarine. Its minelayer also defended the Danube Delta from inland, leading to the sinking of one Austro-Hungarian Danube monitor. (See also Romanian Black Sea Fleet during World War I)

Despite losing most of their coastline to the Central Powers after the Second Battle of Cobadin in October 1916, the Romanians still managed to keep the mouths of the Danube and the Danube Delta under their control, due to the combined actions of their riverine flotilla of four monitors and the protected cruiser Elisabeta, based at Sulina. The Romanian Navy repelled two attacks of the Imperial German Navy on the port of Sulina. The first attack took place on 30 September 1916, when the Romanian torpedo boat Smeul engaged the German submarine UB-42 near Sulina, damaging her periscope and conning tower and forcing her to retreat. The second attack took place on 7 November, when German Friedrichshafen FF.33 seaplanes bombarded Sulina but two of them were shot down into the sea by Romanian anti-aircraft defenses (including the cruiser Elisabeta) and were subsequently captured by Romanian motorboats. In mid-November 1916, UC-15, the only minelaying submarine of the Central Powers in the Black Sea, was sent to lay 12 mines off Sulina and never returned, being most likely sunk by her own mines along with all of her crew. She could have also been sunk by the barrage of 30 mines laid at Sulina by the Romanian minelayer Alexandru cel Bun.

When Bulgaria entered World War I in 1915, its navy consisted mainly of a French-built torpedo gunboat called Nadezhda and six torpedo boats. It mostly engaged in mine warfare actions in the Black Sea against the Russian Black Sea Fleet and allowed the Germans to station two U-boats at Varna, one of which came under Bulgarian control in 1916 as Podvodnik No. 18. Russian mines sank one Bulgarian torpedo boat and damaged one more during the war.

=== Baltic Sea ===
In the Baltic Sea, Germany and Russia were the main combatants, with a number of British submarines sailing through the Kattegat to assist the Russians. With the German fleet larger and more modern (many High Seas Fleet ships could easily be deployed to the Baltic when the North Sea was quiet), the Russians played a mainly defensive role, at most attacking convoys between Germany and Sweden.

A major coup for the Allied forces occurred on August 26, 1914 when as part of a reconnaissance squadron, the light cruiser SMS Magdeburg ran aground in heavy fog in the Gulf of Finland. The other German ships tried to refloat her, but decided to scuttle her instead when they became aware of an approaching Russian intercept force. Russian Navy divers scoured the wreck and successfully recovered the German naval codebook which was later passed on to their British Allies and contributed immeasurably to Allied success in the North Sea.

With heavy defensive and offensive mining on both sides, fleets played a limited role in the Eastern Front. The Germans mounted major naval attacks on the Gulf of Riga, unsuccessfully in August 1915 and successfully in October 1917, when they occupied the islands in the Gulf and damaged Russian ships departing from the city of Riga, recently captured by Germany. This second operation culminated in the one major Baltic action, the battle of Moon Sound at which the Russian battleship Slava was sunk.

By March 1918, the Russian Revolution and the Treaty of Brest-Litovsk made the Baltic a German lake, and German fleets transferred troops to support the White side in the Finnish Civil War and to occupy much of Russia, halting only when defeated in the west.

=== Asia and the Pacific ===
A number of German ships stationed overseas at the start of the war engaged in raiding operations in poorly defended seas, such as SMS Emden, which raided into the Indian Ocean, sinking or capturing thirty Allied merchant ships and warships, bombarding Madras and Penang, and destroying a radio relay on the Cocos Islands before being sunk there by HMAS Sydney. Better known was the German East Asia Squadron, commanded by Admiral Graf Maximilian von Spee, who sailed across the Pacific, raiding Papeete and winning the Battle of Coronel before being defeated and mostly destroyed at the Battle of the Falkland Islands. The last remnants of Spee's squadron were interned at Chilean ports and destroyed at the Battle of Más a Tierra.

Allied naval forces captured many of the isolated German colonies, with Samoa, Micronesia, Qingdao, German New Guinea, Togo, and Cameroon falling in the first year of the war. As Austria-Hungary refused to withdraw its cruiser SMS Kaiserin Elisabeth from the German naval base of Qingdao, Japan declared war in 1914 not only on Germany, but also on Austria-Hungary. The cruiser participated in the defense of Qingdao where it was sunk in November 1914.

=== Africa ===
Despite the loss of the last German cruiser in the Indian Ocean, SMS Königsberg, off the coast of German East Africa in July 1915, German East Africa held out in a long guerilla land campaign. British naval units despatched through Africa under Lieutenant-Commander Geoffrey Spicer-Simson had won strategic control of Lake Tanganyika in a series of engagements by February 1916, though fighting on land in German East Africa continued until 1918.

== Fleets overview ==
=== Allied Powers ===
- Grand Fleet
  - Dover Patrol
  - Northern Patrol
- Convoys in World War I
- Imperial Japanese Fleet

=== Central Powers ===
- High Seas Fleet
- Austro-Hungarian Navy
