= Type U 87 submarine =

1916 class of German submarines

Class overview
- Builders: Germaniawerft, Kiel and Kaiserliche Werft Danzig
- Operators: Imperial German Navy
- Preceded by: Type U 81
- Succeeded by: Type U 93
- Completed: 6
- Lost: 4

General characteristics
- Class & type: Type U 87 submarine
- Displacement: 757 t (745 long tons) surfaced; 998 t (982 long tons) submerged
- Length: 65.80 m (215 ft 11 in) (o/a); 50.07 m (164 ft 3 in) (pressure hull)
- Beam: 6.20 m (20 ft 4 in) (oa); 4.18 m (13 ft 9 in) (pressure hull)
- Height: 9.35 m (30 ft 8 in)
- Draught: 3.88 m (12 ft 9 in)
- Installed power: 2 × 2,400 PS (1,765 kW; 2,367 shp) surfaced; 2 × 1,200 PS (883 kW; 1,184 shp) submerged
- Propulsion: 2 shafts, 2 × 1.66 m (5 ft 5 in) propellers
- Speed: 16.8 knots (31.1 km/h; 19.3 mph) surfaced; 9.1 knots (16.9 km/h; 10.5 mph) submerged
- Range: 11,380 nmi (21,080 km; 13,100 mi) at 8 knots (15 km/h; 9.2 mph) surfaced; 56 nmi (104 km; 64 mi) at 5 knots (9.3 km/h; 5.8 mph) submerged
- Test depth: 50 m (164 ft 1 in)
- Complement: 4 officers, 32 enlisted
- Armament: 4 × 50 cm (19.7 in) torpedo tubes (two bow, two stern); 10-12 torpedoes; 1 × 10.5 cm (4.1 in) SK L/45 deck gun; 1 × 8.8 cm (3.5 in) SK L/30 deck gun

Type 87 was a class of U-boats built during World War I by the Kaiserliche Marine.

== Design ==
Type 87 U-boats carried 16 torpedoes and had various arrangements of deck guns. U 87 and U 89 had one 10.5 cm/45 and one 8.8 cm deck gun, U 88 was probably equally armed. U 90 - U 92 were armed with one 10.5 cm/45 gun (140-240 rounds).

They carried a crew of 36 and had excellent seagoing abilities with a cruising range of approximately 11,220 nautical miles (20,780 km; 12,910 mi). Many arrangements from the Type 81, 87, and 93 were also seen on the World War II Type IX U-boats when their design work took place 20 years later.

Compared to the previous type 81, the 87s were 4.26 metres (14.0 ft) shorter, while the pressure hull was shortened .48 metres (1 ft 7 in). They were 1.2 knots (2.2 km/h; 1.4 mph) slower on the surface, and .5 knots (0.93 km/h; 0.58 mph) slower submerged, but increased range by 180 nautical miles (330 km; 210 mi) to 11,380 nautical miles (21,080 km; 13,100 mi) at 8 knots. They carried 16 torpedoes instead of 12. As with the previous type, there was a mixture of guns. Crew size was increased by 1 to 36.

Compared to the following type 93, the 87s were 5.75 metres (18.9 ft) shorter, with the pressure hull 5.98 metres (19.6 ft) shorter and 105 tons lighter. Their range was 2,288 nautical miles (4,237 km; 2,633 mi) longer, but speed was 1.2 knots (2.2 km/h; 1.4 mph) slower on the surface and unchanged submerged.

== Service history ==
Type 87 boats were responsible for sinking 2.218% of all allied shipping sunk during the war, taking a total of 284,961 combined tons. They also damaged 36,595 combined tons.

Boat	Sunk	Damaged	Total
U-87	59,828	7,638	67,466
U-88	39,382	845	40,227
U-89	8,496	324	8,820
U-90	74,175	8,594	82,769
U-91	87,119	11,821	98,940
U-92	15,961	7,373	23,334
Totals	284,961	36,595	321,556

== Bibliography ==
- Gröner, Erich; Jung, Dieter; Maass, Martin (1991). U-boats and Mine Warfare Vessels. German Warships 1815–1945. Vol. 2. Translated by Thomas, Keith; Magowan, Rachel. London: Conway Maritime Press. ISBN 0-85177-593-4.
