= List of the largest ships hit by U-boats in World War I =

During the First World War, U-boats of the German Imperial Navy (German: Kaiserliche Marine) and the Austro-Hungarian Navy (German: Kaiserliche und Königliche Kriegsmarine or K.u.K. Kriegsmarine) sank over 6,000 Allied and neutral ships totaling over 14,200,000 tons. Many additional ships that are not included in those totals were damaged, but were able to return to service after repairs. This list contains the approximately 100 ships over 10,000 tons that were either damaged or sunk by U-boats by torpedoes, submarine-laid mines, gunfire, or other means. (Note: Merchant ship tonnages are in gross register tons. Military vessels are listed by tons displacement)

== List ==
Ships listed are presented in descending order on the tonnage figure. Those that were damaged are indicated with an asterisk after their names. Three ships—Justicia, Celtic, and Southland—appear on the list twice. Justicia was damaged by UB-64 on 19 July 1918 and sunk while under tow the following day by UB-124. Celtic was damaged by U-80 and UB-77 in separate incidents in February 1917 and March 1918, respectively. Southland was seriously damaged by UB-14 in September 1915 and sunk by SM U-70 in June 1917. All U-boats listed are German unless otherwise noted in the table.

Kapitänleutnant (Kptlt.) Otto Weddigen in U-9 sank three Royal Navy cruisers that appear on the list—Aboukir, Hogue, and Cressy—in a little more than an hour during the action of 22 September 1914. The first three victims of UB-14's career—the Amalfi, the British troopship Royal Edward, and the troopship Southland (which was seriously damaged) in July, August, and September 1915, respectively—are all on the list.

Four U-boat commanders appear four or more times on the list. Kptlt. Hans Rose in U-53 sank two ships and damaged two others between June 1917 and April 1918, while Kptlt. Otto Steinbrinck in UC-65 did the same between March and July 1917. Between October 1916 and October 1918, Kptlt. Wolfgang Steinbauer sank three ships on the list in UB-47 and damaged a fourth in UB-48. Kptlt. Gustav Sieß—responsible for sinking the largest ship on the list, the hospital ship Britannic struck a mine and sunk (the younger sister ship of Titanic and Olympic)—topped the list with five entries, four (including Britannic) sunk in U-73 and a fifth sunk in U-33, all between April 1916 and April 1917. Other notable commanders that appear on the list are Kptlt. Lothar von Arnauld de la Perière (three times) who sank the most tonnage of any submarine commander ever, and Linienschiffsleutnant Georg Ritter von Trapp of the Austro-Hungarian Navy (two times), known as the patriarch of the family made famous in The Sound of Music and its subsequent film adaptation.

Largest ships hit by U-boats in World War I
Ship	Type	Nationality	Tons	Date	U-boat	Commander	Notes
HMHS Britannic	Hospital ship	Royal Navy	48,758	21 November 1916	U-73	Gustav Sieß	Sunk by Mine
Justicia (Note: damaged but not sunk)	Troop ship	United Kingdom	32,234	19 July 1918	UB-64	Otto von Schrader	Damaged, taken under tow
Justicia	Troop ship	United Kingdom	32,234	20 July 1918	UB-124	Hans Oskar Wutsdorff	Sunk while under tow from 1st attack
Lusitania	Passenger ship	United Kingdom	30,396	7 May 1915	U-20	Walther Schwieger	Sunk with great loss of life
Jean Bart	Battleship	French Navy	22,189	21 December 1914	U-12 (Austria-Hungary)	Egon Lerch	Returned to port under own power
Celtic	Troop ship/Passenger ship	United Kingdom	20,904	15 February 1917	U-80	Alfred von Glasenapp	Struck mine, returned to port under tow
Celtic	Cargo ship	United Kingdom	20,904	31 March 1918	UB-77	Wilhelm Meyer	Torpedoed, returned to port under tow
Merion	Decoy	United Kingdom	19,380	29 May 1915	UB-8	Ernst von Voigt	Decoy disguised as HMS Tiger, sunk
Lapland	Passenger ship	United Kingdom	18,565	7 April 1917	UC-65	Otto Steinbrinck	Struck mine, returned to port
Franconia	Troop ship	United Kingdom	18,510	4 October 1916	UB-47	Wolfgang Steinbauer	Torpedoed while empty
Voltaire	Battleship	French Navy	18,400	18 October 1918	UB-48	Wolfgang Steinbauer	Lightly damaged by 2 torpedoes
USS Mount Vernon	Troop ship	United States Navy	18,372	5 September 1918	U-82	Heinrich Middendorf	Heavy damage, returned to port under own power
Danton	Battleship	French Navy	18,300	19 March 1917	U-64	Robert Moraht	Torpedoed and sunk
USS President Lincoln	Troop ship	United States Navy	18,168	31 May 1918	U-90	Walter Remy	Torpedoed and sunk, most lives saved
Laconia	Passenger ship	United Kingdom	18,099	25 February 1917	U-50	Gerhard Berger	
USS Minnesota	Battleship	United States Navy	18,000	29 September 1918	U-117	Otto Dröscher	
HMS Britannia	Battleship	Royal Navy	16,350	9 November 1918	UB-50	Heinrich Kukat	
USS Covington	Troop ship	United States Navy	16,339	1 July 1918	U-86	Helmut Brümmer-Patzig	
Arabic	Passenger ship	United Kingdom	15,801	19 August 1915	U-24	Rudolf Schneider	
Rurik	Cruiser	Imperial Russian Navy	15,544	19 November 1916	UC-27	Karl Vesper	
HMS Formidable	Battleship	Royal Navy	15,000	1 January 1915	U-24	Rudolf Schneider	
Gallia	Troop ship	France	14,966	4 October 1916	U-35	Lothar von Arnauld de la Perière	
HMS Majestic	Battleship	Royal Navy	14,900	27 May 1915	U-21	Otto Hersing	
Laurentic	Armed merchant cruiser	United Kingdom	14,892	25 January 1917	U-80	Alfred von Glasenapp	
Transylvania	Passenger ship	United Kingdom	14,348	4 May 1917	U-63	Otto Schultze	
Tuscania	Troop ship	United Kingdom	14,348	5 February 1918	UB-77	Wilhelm Meyer	
Minnewaska	Troop ship	United Kingdom	14,317	29 November 1916	UC-23	Johannes Kirchner	
HMS Drake	Cruiser	Royal Navy	14,300	2 October 1917	U-79	Otto Rohrbeck	
Ivernia	Troop ship	Royal Navy	14,278	1 January 1917	UB-47	Wolfgang Steinbauer	
HMS King Alfred	Cruiser	Royal Navy	14,150	11 April 1918	UB-86	Hans Trenk	
HMS Russell	Battleship	Royal Navy	14,000	27 April 1916	U-73	Gustav Sieß	
HMS Cornwallis	Battleship	Royal Navy	14,000	9 January 1917	U-32	Kurt Hartwig	
Aurania	Troop ship	United Kingdom	13,936	4 February 1918	UB-67	Gerhard Schulz	
Tubantia	Passenger ship	Netherlands	13,911	16 March 1916	UB-13	Arthur Metz	
La Provence	Troop ship	France	13,753	26 February 1916	U-35	Lothar von Arnauld de la Perière	
Minnehaha	Passenger ship	United Kingdom	13,714	7 September 1917	U-48	Karl Edeling	
USS San Diego	Cruiser	United States Navy	13,680	19 July 1918	U-156	Richard Feldt	
Carpathia	Passenger ship	United Kingdom	13,603	17 July 1918	U-55	Wilhelm Werner	Torpedoed
Minneapolis	Troop ship	United Kingdom	13,543	23 March 1916	U-35	Lothar von Arnauld de la Perière	
Minnetonka	Troop ship	United Kingdom	13,528	30 January 1918	U-64	Robert Moraht	
Peresvet	Battleship	Imperial Russian Navy	13,500	2 January 1917	U-73	Gustav Sieß	
Avenger	Armed merchant cruiser	United Kingdom	13,441	14 June 1917	U-69	Ernst Wilhelms	
Regina Margherita	Battleship	Regia Marina	13,427	12 December 1916	UC-14	Franz Becker	
Alaunia	Troop ship/Passenger ship	United Kingdom	13,405	19 October 1916	UC-16	Egon von Werner	
Andania	Passenger ship	United Kingdom	13,405	27 January 1918	U-46	Leo Hillebrand	
Cymric	Cargo ship	United Kingdom	13,370	8 May 1916	U-20	Walther Schwieger	
Orama	Armed merchant cruiser	United Kingdom	12,927	19 October 1917	U-62	Ernst Hashagen	
Suffren	Battleship	French Navy	12,750	25 November 1916	U-52	Hans Walther	
Athos	Troop ship/Passenger ship	France	12,644	17 February 1917	U-65	Hermann von Fischel	
Rijndam (ID-2505)	Troop ship	Netherlands	12,527	18 January 1916	UC-1	Egon von Werner	
Calgarian (1913)	Armed merchant cruiser	United Kingdom	12,515	1 March 1918	U-19	Johannes Spieß	
Missanabie	Passenger ship	United Kingdom	12,469	9 September 1918	UB-87	Karl Petri	
Maloja	Passenger ship	United Kingdom	12,431	27 February 1916	UC-6	Matthias Graf von Schmettow	
Léon Gambetta	Cruiser	French Navy	12,416	27 April 1915	U-5 (Austria-Hungary)	Georg Ritter von Trapp	
Medina	Passenger ship	United Kingdom	12,350	28 April 1917	UB-31	Thomas Bieber	
Finland	Troop ship	United States Army	12,222	28 October 1917	U-93	Helmut Gerlach	
Argyllshire	Cargo ship	United Kingdom	12,097	5 February 1917	UC-46	Friedrich Moecke	
Otway	Armed merchant cruiser	United Kingdom	12,077	23 July 1917	UC-49	Karl Petri	
Persic	Troop ship	United Kingdom	12,045	7 September 1918	UB-87	Karl Petri	
Orsova	Troop ship	United Kingdom	12,036	14 March 1917	UC-68	Hans Degetau	
Burdigala	Auxiliary cruiser	France	12,009	14 November 1916	U-73	Gustav Sieß	
Asturias	Hospital ship	United Kingdom	12,002	20 March 1917	UC-66	Herbert Pustkuchen	
HMS Aboukir	Cruiser	Royal Navy	12,000	22 September 1914	U-9	Otto Weddigen	
HMS Cressy	Cruiser	Royal Navy	12,000	22 September 1914	U-9	Otto Weddigen	
HMS Hogue	Cruiser	Royal Navy	12,000	22 September 1914	U-9	Otto Weddigen	
Afric	Troop ship	United Kingdom	11,999	12 February 1917	UC-66	Herbert Pustkuchen	
HMS Triumph	Battleship	Royal Navy	11,985	25 May 1915	U-21	Otto Hersing	
HMT Southland	Troop ship	Royal Navy	11,899	2 September 1915	UB-14	Heino von Heimburg	
HMT Southland	Passenger ship	Royal Navy	11,899	4 June 1917	U-70	Otto Wünsche	
Haverford	Troop ship	United Kingdom	11,635	26 June 1917	U-94	Alfred Saalwächter	
Volturno	Cargo ship	Kingdom of Italy	11,495	26 March 1918	UB-50	Franz Becker	
Demerara	Passenger ship	United Kingdom	11,484	1 July 1917	U-84	Walter Roehr	
Drina	Cargo ship	United Kingdom	11,483	1 March 1917	UC-65	Otto Steinbrinck	
Milazzo	Cargo ship	Kingdom of Italy	11,477	29 August 1917	U-14 (Austria-Hungary)	Georg Ritter von Trapp	
HMHS Llandovery Castle	Hospital ship	Royal Navy	11,423	27 June 1918	U-86	Helmut Brümmer-Patzig	
Rotorua	Cargo ship	United Kingdom	11,140	22 March 1917	UC-17	Ralph Wenninger	
HMAS Berrima	Troop ship	Australia	11,137	18 February 1917	U-84	Walter Roehr	
Ballarat	Troop ship	United Kingdom	11,120	25 April 1917	UB-32	Max Viebeg	
HMT Royal Edward	Troop ship	Royal Canadian Navy	11,117	13 August 1915	UB-14	Heino von Heimburg	
Cadillac		United Kingdom	11,106	7 April 1918	U-53	Hans Rose	
Gaulois	Battleship	French Navy	11,100	27 December 1916	UB-47	Wolfgang Steinbauer	
HMS Ariadne	Cruiser	Royal Navy	11,000	26 July 1917	UC-65	Otto Steinbrinck	
Cameronia	Troop ship	United Kingdom	10,963	15 April 1917	U-33	Gustav Sieß	
Yasaka Maru		Japan	10,932	21 December 1915	U-38	Max Valentiner	
Hesperian	Passenger ship	United Kingdom	10,920	4 September 1915	U-20	Walther Schwieger	
HMS Roxburgh	Cruiser	Royal Navy	10,850	20 June 1915	U-38	Max Valentiner	
HMS Hampshire	Cruiser	Royal Navy	10,850	5 June 1916	U-75	Curt Beitzen	
New York	Troop ship	United States	10,798	9 April 1917	UC-65	Otto Steinbrinck	
Virginian	Armed merchant cruiser	United Kingdom	10,757	21 August 1917	U-102	Ernst Killmann	
Hurunui		United Kingdom	10,644	18 May 1918	U-94	Martin Schwab	
Marmora		United Kingdom	10,509	23 July 1918	UB-64	Otto von Schrader	
Devonian		United Kingdom	10,435	21 August 1917	U-53	Hans Rose	
Winifredian	Passenger-cargo ship	United Kingdom	10,422	17 April 1917	UC-76	Wilhelm Barten	
Ultonia	Passenger-cargo ship	United Kingdom	10,402	27 June 1917	U-53	Hans Rose	
Rowanmore		United Kingdom	10,320	26 October 1916	U-57	Carl-Siegfried Ritter von Georg	
O. B. Jennings		United States	10,289	4 August 1918	U-140	Waldemar Kophamel	
San Melito		United Kingdom	10,160	21 August 1915	U-38	Max Valentiner	
San Hilario		United Kingdom	10,157	20 April 1917	U-43	Hellmuth Jürst	
Amalfi	Cruiser	Regia Marina	10,118	7 July 1915	UB-14	Heino von Heimburg	
San Nazario		United Kingdom	10,064	15 October 1917	U-53	Hans Rose	
Raranga		United Kingdom	10,040	26 June 1918	UC-71	Walter Warzecha	
Amazon	Cargo ship	United Kingdom	10,037	15 March 1918	U-110	Karl Kroll	

== Bibliography ==
- Gibson, R. H.; Maurice Prendergast (2003) [1931]. The German Submarine War, 1914–1918. Annapolis, Maryland: Naval Institute Press. ISBN 9781591143147. OCLC 52924732.
- Tarrant, V.E. (1989). The U-Boat Offensive: 1914–1945. Annapolis, MD: Naval Institute Press. ISBN 978-0-87021-764-7. OCLC 20338385.
