= List of shipwrecks in September 1918 =

The list of shipwrecks in September 1918 includes ships sunk, foundered, grounded, or otherwise lost during September 1918.

== 1 September ==
List of shipwrecks: 1 September 1918
Ship	State	Description
Ami de Dieu	France	World War I: The trawler was sunk in the Atlantic Ocean (approximately 47°32′N 8°55′W) by SM U-53 (Imperial German Navy).
City of Glasgow	United Kingdom	World War I: The passenger ship was torpedoed and sunk in the Atlantic Ocean 21 nautical miles (39 km) east of the Tuskar Rock, Ireland (52°17′N 5°38′W) by SM UB-118 (Imperial German Navy) with the loss of twelve lives.
Etoile Polaire	France	World War I: The trawler was shelled and sunk in the Atlantic Ocean 176 nautical miles (326 km) off Penmarc'h, Finistère (47°32′N 8°55′W) by SM U-53 (Imperial German Navy) with the loss of a crew member.
Libertador	Portugal	World War I: The trawler was scuttled west of Gibraltar by SM U-22 (Imperial German Navy).
Mesaba	United Kingdom	World War I: The cargo ship was torpedoed and sunk in the Atlantic Ocean 21 nautical miles (39 km) east of the Tuskar Rock (52°17′N 5°38′W) by SM UB-118 (Imperial German Navy) with the loss of twenty of her crew.
St. Louis	United States	The steamer sank, partially submerged, in 25 feet (7.6 m) of water 22 miles (35 km) south of St. Louis, Missouri. One passenger killed.

== 2 September ==
List of shipwrecks: 2 September 1918
Ship	State	Description
SMS Estebrugge	Imperial German Navy	The Vorpostenboot was lost on this date.
Hirondelle	France	World War I: The fishing vessel was sunk in the Atlantic Ocean (47°32′N 8°55′W) by SM U-53 (Imperial German Navy).
Nicolazic	France	World War I: The fishing vessel was sunk in the Atlantic Ocean (47°32′N 8°55′W) by SM U-53 (Imperial German Navy). Her crew survived.
San Andres	United Kingdom	World War I: The cargo ship was torpedoed and sunk in the Mediterranean Sea 40 nautical miles (74 km) north by west of Port Said, Egypt by SM U-65 (Imperial German Navy). Her crew survived.
Stortind	Norway	World War I: The cargo ship was scuttled in the Atlantic Ocean 360 nautical miles (670 km) north of the Azores, Portugal by SM U-155 (Imperial German Navy). Her crew survived.

== 3 September ==
List of shipwrecks: 3 September 1918
Ship	State	Description
Brava	Portugal	World War I: The cargo ship was torpedoed and sunk in the Atlantic Ocean 3.5 nautical miles (6.5 km) north west of Trevose Head, Cornwall, United Kingdom (50°34′N 5°06′W) by SM UB-125 (Imperial German Navy) with the loss of seventeen of her crew.
Bogstad	Norway	The cargo ship departed from Brest, Finistère, France for Cardiff, Glamorgan, United Kingdom. No further trace, presumed foundered with the loss of all hands.
Highcliffe	United Kingdom	World War I: The cargo ship was torpedoed and sunk in the Atlantic Ocean 13 nautical miles (24 km) south east of the Tuskar Rock, Ireland (51°56′N 5°54′W) by SM UB-87 (Imperial German Navy) with the loss of a crew member.
Lake Owens	United States	World War I: The cargo ship was sunk in the Atlantic Ocean 3.5 nautical miles (6.5 km) north west by west of Trevose Head (50°32′N 5°08′W) by SM UB-125 (Imperial German Navy) with the loss of five of her crew.

== 4 September ==
List of shipwrecks: 4 September 1918
Ship	State	Description
Arum	United Kingdom	World War I: The cargo ship was torpedoed and sunk in the Mediterranean Sea 40 nautical miles (74 km) east of Pantelleria, Italy (36°50′N 12°50′E) by SM UC-54 (Imperial German Navy). Her crew survived.
Bogstad	Norway	World War I: The cargo ship was sunk in the Bristol Channel 18 nautical miles (33 km) south of Lundy Island, Devon, United Kingdom by SM UB-125 (Imperial German Navy) with the loss of all twelve of her crew.
Dora	United States	World War I: The cargo ship was sunk in the Atlantic Ocean off the coast of France (49°26′N 12°36′W) by SM U-82 (Imperial German Navy). Her crew survived.
Richard	Norway	World War I: The sailing vessel was sunk in the Mediterranean Sea off Mallorca, Spain (39°49′N 1°51′E) by SM U-34 (Imperial German Navy). Her crew survived.
Santa Maria	Portugal	World War I: The trawler was scuttled in the Atlantic Ocean off Peniche by SM U-22 (Imperial German Navy).
Villa Franca	Portugal	World War I: The tug was shelled and sunk in the Atlantic Ocean off Lisbon by SM U-22 (Imperial German Navy).
War Firth	United Kingdom	World War I: The cargo ship was torpedoed and sunk in the Atlantic Ocean 33 nautical miles (61 km) south by west of The Lizard, Cornwall by SM U-53 (Imperial German Navy) with the loss of eleven crew.

== 5 September ==
List of shipwrecks: 5 September 1918
Ship	State	Description
Dolphin	Soviet Navy Red Movement	Russian Civil War: The gunboat was shelled and sunk at Kazan on the Volga River by White Movement or Czechoslovak Legion artillery.
Rio Mondego	Portugal	World War I: The schooner was damaged by scuttling charges in the Atlantic Ocean 40 nautical miles (74 km) off Land's End, Cornwall, United Kingdom. The charges were placed by SM U-53 (Imperial German Navy). She was towed to the Isles of Scilly and beached. Despite being placed under guard, some of her cargo of port was liberated by the locals.
SM UC-91	Imperial German Navy	The Type UC III submarine collided with Alexandra Woermann (Germany) in the Baltic Sea (54°21′N 10°10′E) and sank with the loss of 17 crew. She was raised on 6 September, repaired and returned to service.

== 6 September ==
List of shipwrecks: 6 September 1918
Ship	State	Description
Almirante	United Kingdom	The United Fruit Company passenger-cargo ship sank in the Atlantic Ocean after colliding with the tanker USS Hisko (United States Navy) 16 nautical miles (30 km) off the coast of New Jersey near Atlantic City at approximately (39°21′N 74°13′W). All but five to seven of the 105 passengers and crew survived.
Audax	United Kingdom	World War I: The coaster was torpedoed and sunk in the North Sea 6.5 nautical miles (12.0 km) east by north of Robin Hood's Bay, Yorkshire (54°29′N 0°21′W) by SM UB-80 (Imperial German Navy) with the loss of three of her crew.
Milly	United Kingdom	World War I: The collier was torpedoed and sunk in the Atlantic Ocean 2.25 nautical miles (4.17 km) west by south of Tintagel Head, Cornwall (50°30′N 4°52′W) by SM UB-87 (Imperial German Navy) with the loss of two of her crew.

== 7 September ==
List of shipwrecks: 7 September 1918
Ship	State	Description
Bellbank	United Kingdom	World War I: The cargo ship was torpedoed and sunk in the Mediterranean Sea 25 nautical miles (46 km) south south west of the Île du Planier, Bouches-du-Rhône, France (42°48′N 5°08′E) by SM UC-67 (Imperial German Navy) with the loss of a crew member.
SMS M41	Imperial German Navy	World War I: The Type 1915 minesweeper struck a mine and sank.
Ruysdael	United Kingdom	World War I: The cargo ship was torpedoed and sunk in the Atlantic Ocean 228 nautical miles (422 km) west by south of Ouessant, Finistère, France (46°53′N 10°07′W) by SM U-105 (Imperial German Navy) with the loss of twelve crew.
Santa Maria	Portugal	The barque was destroyed by fire in the Atlantic Ocean (13°25′S 15°00′W). Her crew survived.
Sophia	Portugal	World War I: The schooner was sunk in the Atlantic Ocean off the coast of Newfoundland by SM U-155 (Imperial German Navy).
Vicenza	Italy	World War I: The cargo ship was sunk in the Mediterranean Sea south of Salonica, Greece (39°42′N 23°18′E) by SM UB-42 (Imperial German Navy).

== 8 September ==
List of shipwrecks: 8 September 1918
Ship	State	Description
HMS Nessus	Royal Navy	The Admiralty M-class destroyer collided with HMS Amphitrite (Royal Navy) in the North Sea and sank.

== 9 September ==
List of shipwrecks: 9 September 1918
Ship	State	Description
Dorisbrook	United Kingdom	The collier collided with HMS Orbita (Royal Navy) and sank in the Pacific Ocean off the coast of Peru. Her crew were rescued by HMS Orbita.
Baywest	United Kingdom	World War I: The cargo ship was accidentally shelled by a French steamer, she caught fire and sank 1.5 miles (2.4 km) south west of Longships, Cornwall.
Helvetia	Norway	World War I: The sailing vessel was sunk in the North Sea 22 nautical miles (41 km) west south west of Lindesnes, Vest-Agder by SM U-80 (Imperial German Navy). Her crew survived.
Missanabie	United Kingdom	World War I: The ocean liner was torpedoed and sunk in the Irish Sea 51°11′N 7°25′W) by SM UB-87 (Imperial German Navy) with the loss of 45 lives.
Taurus	Norway	World War I: The cargo ship was sunk in the North Sea 1 nautical mile (1.9 km) north of Scarborough, Yorkshire, United Kingdom by SM UB-80 (Imperial German Navy) with the loss of six of her crew.
SM U-92	Imperial German Navy	World War I: The Type U 87 submarine struck a mine in the North Sea (59°00′N 1°30′W) and sank with the loss of all 39 crew.
War Arabis	United Kingdom	World War I: The cargo ship was torpedoed and sunk in the Mediterranean Sea 88 nautical miles (163 km) north by east of Cape Sigli, Algeria (38°08′N 5°30′E) by SM U-34 (Imperial German Navy). Her crew survived.

== 10 September ==
List of shipwrecks: 10 September 1918
Ship	State	Description
SM UB-83	Imperial German Navy	World War I: The Type UB III submarine was depth charged and sunk in the North Sea off the Orkney Islands, United Kingdom (58°28′N 1°50′W) by HMS Ophelia (Royal Navy) with the loss of all 37 crew.

== 11 September ==
List of shipwrecks: 11 September 1918
Ship	State	Description
Governor Powers	United States	The schooner was sunk in a collision in western Nantucket Sound.

== 12 September ==
For the scuttling of the Danish schooner Skjold on this date, see the entry for 3 August 1918.

List of shipwrecks: 12 September 1918
Ship	State	Description
Galway Castle	United Kingdom	World War I: The ocean liner was torpedoed and damaged in the Atlantic Ocean 160 nautical miles (300 km) south west of the Fastnet Rock (48°50′N 10°40′W) by SM U-82 (Imperial German Navy). She was taken in tow but sank on 15 September with the loss of 143 lives.
Leixões	Portugal	World War I: The cargo ship was torpedoed and sunk in the Atlantic Ocean 200 nautical miles (370 km) off the coast of the United States by SM U-155 (Imperial German Navy).
HMS Sarnia	Royal Navy	World War I: The armed boarding steamer was sunk in the Mediterranean Sea off Alexandria, Egypt (31°58′N 30°55′E) by SM U-65 (Imperial German Navy) with the loss of 55 crew.

== 13 September ==
List of shipwrecks: 13 September 1918
Ship	State	Description
Amiral Charner	France	World War I: The cargo ship was sunk in the Mediterranean Sea 44 nautical miles (81 km) west of Pantellaria, Italy (36°36′N 12°58′E) by SM U-41 (Austro-Hungarian Navy).
Buffalo	United Kingdom	World War I: The coaster was torpedoed and sunk in the Irish Sea of Corsewall Point, Wigtownshire by SM UB-64 (Imperial German Navy) with the loss of ten of her crew.
M. J. Craig	United Kingdom	World War I: The coaster was torpedoed and sunk in the Irish Sea 7 nautical miles (13 km) north east of Black Head, County Antrim by SM UB-64 (Imperial German Navy) with the loss of four of her crew.
Setter	United Kingdom	World War I: The passenger ship was torpedoed and sunk in the Irish Sea 9 nautical miles (17 km) north west of Stranraer, Wigtownshire by SM UB-64 (Imperial German Navy) with the loss of nine of her crew.

== 14 September ==
List of shipwrecks: 14 September 1918
Ship	State	Description
Agios Nicolas	Greece	World War I: The sailing vessel was sunk in the Mediterranean Sea 10 nautical miles (19 km) south east of Paphos by SM U-27 (Austro-Hungarian Navy). Her crew survived.
Columbia	United States	The 19-gross register ton, 41-foot (12.5 m) fishing vessel sank in Saint Matthews Bay (60°44′N 146°20′W) on the south-central coast of the Territory of Alaska. All five people on board survived.
Gibel Hamam	United Kingdom	World War I: The coaster was torpedoed and sunk in the English Channel 15 nautical miles (28 km) south of Portland Bill by SM UB-104 (Imperial German Navy) with the loss of 21 of her crew.
Ioanna No.45	United Kingdom	World War I: The sailing vessel was sunk in the Mediterranean Sea by SM U-65 (Imperial German Navy).
Moguchiy	Soviet Navy	Russian Civil War: Allied Intervention in the Russian Civil War; The gunboat was shelled and sunkin the Dvina River by British Monitors. 18 crewmen killed, 5 rescued, 7 POW.
Neotsfield	United Kingdom	World War I: The cargo ship was torpedoed and sunk in the Irish Sea 1.5 nautical miles (2.8 km) off the Skulmartin Lightship (United Kingdom) (54°42′N 5°23′W) by SM UB-64 (Imperial German Navy). Her crew survived.
SM UB-113	Imperial German Navy	World War I: The Type UB III submarine departed Zeebrugge, West Flanders, Belgium on patrol. No further trace, lost with all 39 crew.
Unknown boat	Soviet Navy Red Movement	Russian Civil War: The minelaying boat was run aground and abandoned on the Volga River.

== 15 September ==
List of shipwrecks: 15 September 1918
Ship	State	Description
Ioanna No.37	United Kingdom	World War I: The sailing vessel was sunk in the Mediterranean Sea by SM U-65 (Imperial German Navy).
Energy	United Kingdom	World War I: The sailing vessel was shelled and sunk in the Irish Sea 14 nautical miles (26 km) east south east of the Codling Bank Lightship (United Kingdom) by SM UB-64 (Imperial German Navy).
Joseph Fisher	United Kingdom	World War I: The two-masted schooner was shelled and sunk in the Irish Sea 16 nautical miles (30 km) east north east of the Codling Bank Lightship (United Kingdom) by SM UB-64 (Imperial German Navy).
Kendal Castle	United Kingdom	World War I: The cargo ship was torpedoed and sunk in the English Channel 4 nautical miles (7.4 km) south east of Berry Head, Devon by SM UB-104 (Imperial German Navy) with the loss of eighteen of her crew.
Mary Fanny	United Kingdom	World War I: The ketch was shelled and sunk in the Irish Sea 14 nautical miles (26 km) east south east of the Codling Bank Lightship (United Kingdom) by SM UB-64 (Imperial German Navy).

== 16 September ==
List of shipwrecks: 16 September 1918
Ship	State	Description
Acadian	United Kingdom	World War I: The cargo ship was torpedoed and sunk in the Atlantic Ocean 11 nautical miles (20 km) south west by west of Trevose Head, Cornwall (50°25′10″N 5°15′58″W) by SM UB-117 (Imperial German Navy) with the loss of 25 of her 26 crew.
USS Buena Ventura	United States Navy	World War I: Convoy OV 31: The cargo ship was torpedoed and sunk in the Atlantic Ocean 200 nautical miles (370 km) north west of Spain (44°36′N 13°10′W) by SM UB-129 (Imperial German Navy) with the loss of eighteen of her crew. Survivors were rescued by Lola (Spain) and Temeraire (French Navy).
Dedushka	Soviet Union	Russian Civil War: Allied Intervention in the Russian Civil War; The ship was lost to enemy action.
Ethel	United Kingdom	World War I: The cargo ship was torpedoed and sunk in the English Channel 8 nautical miles (15 km) south east of Berry Head, Devon by SM UB-104 (Imperial German Navy). Her crew survived.
HMS Glatton	Royal Navy	The Gorgon-class monitor caught fire at Dover, Kent and was scuttled by HMS Cossack and HMS Myngs (both Royal Navy) with the loss of 79 of her 305 crew.
G. Voyazides	Greece	World War I: The cargo ship was torpedoed and sunk in the Gulf of Lion by SM UC-67 (Imperial German Navy) with the loss of eighteen of her crew.
Lord Stewart	United Kingdom	World War I: The collier was torpedoed and sunk in the English Channel 6 nautical miles (11 km) east of Hope's Nose, Devon (50°30′N 3°17′W) by SM UB-104 (Imperial German Navy) with the loss of a crew member.
Madryn	United Kingdom	World War I: The collier was torpedoed and sunk in the Atlantic Ocean 5 nautical miles (9.3 km) north north east of Trevose Head (50°38′N 5°01′W) by SM U-82 (Imperial German Navy). Her crew survived.
Philomel	United Kingdom	World War I: The cargo ship was torpedoed and sunk in the Bay of Biscay 12 nautical miles (22 km) south east by east of the Glénan Islands, Finistère (47°43′N 3°41′W) by SM UB-88 (Imperial German Navy). Her crew survived.
Serula	United Kingdom	World War I: The cargo ship was torpedoed and sunk in the Irish Sea 13.5 nautical miles (25.0 km) north east of Strumble Head, Pembrokeshire by SM UB-64 (Imperial German Navy) with the loss of seventeen crew.
Star of Poland	United States	The cargo ship was wrecked at Chiba, Japan.
Tasman	United Kingdom	World War I: The cargo liner was torpedoed and sunk in the Atlantic Ocean 220 nautical miles (410 km) north by west of Cape Villano, Spain by SM U-46 (Imperial German Navy) with the loss of fourteen crew.
Wellington	United Kingdom	World War I: The cargo ship was torpedoed and sunk in the Atlantic Ocean 175 nautical miles (324 km) north west of Cape Villano (45°48′N 10°58′W) by SM U-118 (Imperial German Navy) with the loss of five of her crew.

== 17 September ==
List of shipwrecks: 17 September 1918
Ship	State	Description
Blackford	United States	The cargo ship sprung a leak on her maiden voyage 250 miles (400 km) south of Magdalena Bay and was abandoned. She eventually drifted ashore off Rodo Sinaloa near Mazatlan, Mexico a total loss.
Cairo	Egypt	World War I: The sailing vessel was shelled and sunk in the Mediterranean Sea by an enemy submarine.
Coos Bay	United States	The steamer sank south west of the tip of Baja California.
Igor	Sweden	World War I: The cargo ship sank after an explosion in the North Sea, south of Longstone, while in convoy. Whether it was a torpedo or mine is unknown. Her crew survived.
Lavernock	United Kingdom	World War I: The cargo ship was torpedoed and sunk in the Atlantic Ocean 5 nautical miles (9.3 km) south west of Trevose Head, Cornwall 50°28′N 5°06′W by SM UB-117 (Imperial German Navy). Her crew survived.
Muriel	United Kingdom	World War I: The collier was torpedoed and sunk in the North Sea 3.5 nautical miles (6.5 km) north east of Peterhead, Aberdeenshire (57°32′06″N 1°44′16″W) by SM UC-58 (Imperial German Navy). Her crew survived.
No. 1	Soviet Navy Red Movement	Russian Civil War: The gunboat was grounded in a trap and then shelled by artillery and abandoned on the Kama River. One crewman was killed, another was wounded, and three were captured.
Portaritissa	Italy	World War I: The sailing vessel was sunk in the Mediterranean Sea (35°39′N 26°08′E) by SM U-27 (Austro-Hungarian Navy). Her crew survived.
Sofia	Italy	World War I: The sailing vessel was sunk in the Mediterranean Sea (35°39′N 26°08′E) by SM U-27 (Austro-Hungarian Navy). Her crew survived.
Ursa	Sweden	World War I: The cargo ship was torpedoed and sunk in Lyme Bay by SM UB-104 (Imperial German Navy). Her crew survived.
Wigbert	Imperial German Navy	World War I: The minesweeper struck a mine in the mouth of the Elbe at Cuxhaven, Germany, and became a constructive total loss.

== 18 September ==
List of shipwrecks: 18 September 1918
Ship	State	Description
Adelphotis	Greece	World War I: The sailing vessel was sunk in the Mediterranean Sea (36°14′N 25°25′E) by SM U-27 (Austro-Hungarian Navy). Her crew survived.
Agios Amma	Greece	World War I: The sailing vessel was sunk in the Mediterranean Sea (36°14′N 25°25′E) by SM U-27 (Austro-Hungarian Navy). Her crew survived.
Buffalo	France	World War I: The cargo ship was torpedoed and sunk in the Atlantic Ocean 2 nautical miles (3.7 km) east of St Agnes Head, Cornwall, United Kingdom (50°19′N 5°18′W) by SM UB-117 (Imperial German Navy).
Helena	United States	The cargo ship ran aground on West Chicken Island, Lake Erie. She broke in two on 25 September and was a total loss.
John O. Scott	United Kingdom	World War I: The cargo ship was torpedoed and sunk in the Atlantic Ocean 9 nautical miles (17 km) west by north of Trevose Head, Cornwall (50°32′N 5°16′W) by SM UB-117 (Imperial German Navy) with the loss of eighteen of her crew.
Ledaal	Norway	World War I: The cargo ship was scuttled in the Atlantic Ocean (33°50′N 20°05′W) by SM U-157 (Imperial German Navy) with the loss of a crew member.
Primo	United Kingdom	World War I: The cargo ship was torpedoed and sunk in the Atlantic Ocean 3.5 nautical miles (6.5 km) north north west of the Godrevy Lighthouse, Cornwall (50°17′N 5°28′W) by SM UB-117 (Imperial German Navy). Her crew survived.
USS Scout Patrol No. 907	United States Navy	The patrol vessel caught fire and burned to water line at the entrance to Narragansett Bay.

== 19 September ==
List of shipwrecks: 19 September 1918
Ship	State	Description
Agios Spiridon	Greece	World War I: The sailing vessel was sunk in the Mediterranean Sea (36°04′N 24°00′E) by SM U-27 (Austro-Hungarian Navy). Her crew survived.
Barrister	United Kingdom	World War I: The cargo ship was torpedoed and sunk in the Irish Sea 9 nautical miles (17 km) west of the Chicken Rock Lighthouse, Isle of Man by SM UB-64 (Imperial German Navy) with the loss of 30 crew.
Belliqueux	France	World War I: The vessel struck a mine and sank in the Bay of Biscay 1 nautical mile (1.9 km) off the Tevenec Lighthouse, Île de Sein, Finistère.
Erik	Denmark	World War I: The three-masted schooner was shelled and damaged in the Atlantic Ocean 75 nautical miles (139 km) west of Cape Roca, Spain (38°05′N 10°17′W) by SM UB-129 (Imperial German Navy). She foundered three days later.
Fanny	Sweden	World War I: The cargo ship was sunk in the Raz de Sein by SM UB-88 (Imperial German Navy), with the loss of two crew members.
Gordon C.	Newfoundland	The cargo ship was destroyed by fire 12 nautical miles (22 km) north east of Grate's Cove.

== 20 September ==
List of shipwrecks: 20 September 1918
Ship	State	Description
Aghios Nicolaos	Greece	World War I: The sailing vessel was scuttled in the Mediterranean Sea (36°57′N 22°05′E) by SM U-27 (Austro-Hungarian Navy). Her crew survived.
Aghios Nicolas	Greece	World War I: The sailing vessel was sunk in the Mediterranean Sea (36°26′N 22°20′E) by SM U-27 (Austro-Hungarian Navy). Her crew survived.
Aghios Spiridon	Greece	World War I: The sailing vessel was sunk in the Mediterranean Sea (36°26′N 22°20′E) by SM U-27 (Austro-Hungarian Navy). Her crew survived.
Angelina Pasquale	Italy	World War I: The sailing vessel was sunk in the Mediterranean Sea off Sicily by SM UB-105 (Imperial German Navy).
Circé	French Navy	World War I: The submarine was sunk in the Adriatic Sea (41°39′N 19°25′E) by SM U-47 (Austro-Hungarian Navy) with the loss of all but one of her crew.
Dragonos	Greece	World War I: The sailing vessel was sunk in the Mediterranean Sea (36°59′N 21°59′E) by SM U-27 (Austro-Hungarian Navy). Her crew survived.
Igor	Sweden	The cargo ship sprang a leak and sank.
Kingfisher	United States	World War I: The trawler was sunk in the Atlantic Ocean 85 nautical miles (157 km) off Halifax, Nova Scotia, Canada (43°31′N 61°53′W) by SM U-155 (Imperial German Navy). Her crew survived.
Prof. Elias	Greece	World War I: The sailing vessel was sunk in the Mediterranean Sea (36°42′N 22°12′E) by SM U-27 (Austro-Hungarian Navy). Her crew survived.
San Michele	Italy	World War I: The sailing vessel was sunk in the Mediterranean Sea off Sicily by SM UB-105 (Imperial German Navy).
Theologos	Greece	World War I: The sailing vessel was sunk in the Mediterranean Sea (36°57′N 22°05′E) by SM U-27 (Austro-Hungarian Navy). Her crew survived.
Von Jonquieres	Imperial German Navy	The Max Kochen-class Vorpostenboot capsized and sank in a storm off Helgoland.

== 21 September ==
List of shipwrecks: 21 September 1918
Ship	State	Description
Downshire	United Kingdom	World War I: The coaster was shelled and sunk in the Irish Sea 8 nautical miles (15 km) west of Rockabill by SM UB-64 (Imperial German Navy). Her crew survived.
Santo Fortunato	Italy	World War I: The sailing vessel was sunk in the Mediterranean Sea off Sicily by SM UB-105 (Imperial German Navy).
Staithes	United Kingdom	World War I: The coaster was torpedoed and sunk in the North Sea 1.5 nautical miles (2.8 km) south east by south of Sunderland, County Durham by SM UB-115 (Imperial German Navy) with the loss of four of her crew.

== 22 September ==
List of shipwrecks: 22 September 1918
Ship	State	Description
HMT Elise	Royal Navy	World War I: The 126.3-foot (38.5 m), 239-ton steam minesweeping naval trawler was torpedoed and sunk in the North Sea 2 nautical miles (3.7 km) north east of St. Mary's Lighthouse, Northumberland (55°06′N 1°27′W) in 24-metre (79 ft) of water by SM UB-34 (Imperial German Navy) with the loss of all fourteen of her crew.
Euthamia	United Kingdom	World War I: The trawler struck a mine and sank in the North Sea 6 nautical miles (11 km) east by north of the Humber Lightship (United Kingdom).
Gaia	Portugal	World War I: The sailing vessel was sunk in the Atlantic Ocean off the Azores (37°13′N 23°19′W) by SM U-157 (Imperial German Navy).
Gorsemore	United Kingdom	World War I: The collier was torpedoed and sunk in the Mediterranean Sea 44 nautical miles (81 km) south east of Cape Colonne, Italy (38°28′N 17°51′E) by SM UC-53 (Imperial German Navy). Her crew survived.
Polesley	United Kingdom	World War I: The cargo ship was torpedoed and sunk in the Atlantic Ocean 1 nautical mile (1.9 km) north of the Pendeen Lighthouse, Cornwall (50°13′N 4°46′W) by SM UB-88 (Imperial German Navy) with the loss of 43 of her crew.

== 23 September ==
List of shipwrecks: 23 September 1918
Ship	State	Description
Aldershot	United Kingdom	World War I: The cargo ship was torpedoed and sunk in the English Channel 5 nautical miles (9.3 km) east south east of Dartmouth, Devon by SM UB-104 or SM UB-113 (both Imperial German Navy) with the loss of a crew member.
Edlington	United Kingdom	World War I: The cargo ship was torpedoed and sunk in the Mediterranean Sea 70 nautical miles (130 km) east by south of Cape Passaro, Sicily, Italy (36°42′N 16°37′E) by SM UC-54 (Imperial German Navy). Her crew survived.

== 24 September ==
List of shipwrecks: 24 September 1918
Ship	State	Description
Erik	Sweden	The schooner sprang a leak and sank in the Atlantic Ocean off Huelva, Andalusia, Spain. Her crew were rescued by two Spanish merchant vessels.
Scow No. 21	United States	The scow sank near the dock of the Groton Iron Works, Groton, Connecticut.

== 25 September ==
List of shipwrecks: 25 September 1918
Ship	State	Description
Gloire a Jesus	France	World War I: The sailing vessel was sunk in the Atlantic Ocean approximately 200 nautical miles (370 km) south west of the Isles of Scilly, United Kingdom by SM U-46 (Imperial German Navy).
Hebburn	United Kingdom	World War I: The collier was torpedoed and sunk in the Atlantic Ocean 14 nautical miles (26 km) off Mine Head, Cornwall (51°40′N 7°13′W) by SM UB-91 (Imperial German Navy) with the loss of six of her crew.
Shitomu Maru	Japan	The cargo ship sank at Shinagawa, Tokyo.
SM U-156	Imperial German Navy	World War I: The Type U 151 submarine struck a mine and sank in the North Sea with the loss of all 77 crew.
Unknown boat	Russian Navy White Movement	Russian Civil War: The boat was shelled and damaged by Sergei (Soviet Navy), run aground and abandoned on the Volga River.

== 26 September ==
List of shipwrecks: 26 September 1918
Ship	State	Description
Belle Brice	France	The schooner foundered in a gale at Castellón de la Plana, Spain.
Paul	Belgium	World War I: The coaster was torpedoed and sunk in the North Sea off Robin Hood's Bay, Yorkshire, United Kingdom (54°27′N 0°30′W) by SM UB-21 (Imperial German Navy). Her crew survived.
USCGC Tampa	United States Navy	World War I: Convoy HG 107: The Ungula-class cutter was torpedoed and sunk in the Bristol Channel 50°40′N 6°19′W by SM UB-91 (Imperial German Navy) with the loss of all hands. The numbers of the casualties vary; 131, or 111 Coast Guard, 8 US Navy and some civilian dock workers, or 112 US Navy, 10 Royal Navy and 5 dock workers.

== 27 September ==
List of shipwrecks: 27 September 1918
Ship	State	Description
En Avant	France	World War I: The sailing vessel was sunk in the Atlantic Ocean 45 nautical miles (83 km) north of Ouessant, Finistère by SM U-54 (Imperial German Navy).
Hatasu	United Kingdom	World War I: The cargo ship was torpedoed and sunk in the Mediterranean Sea 50 nautical miles (93 km) north by west of Oran, Algeria (36°32′N 0°53′W) by SM UB-49 (Imperial German Navy) with the loss of two of her crew.

== 28 September ==
List of shipwrecks: 28 September 1918
Ship	State	Description
Baldersby	United Kingdom	World War I: The cargo ship was torpedoed and sunk in the Irish Sea 9 nautical miles (17 km) east of the Codling Bank Lightship (United Kingdom) by SM UB-91 (Imperial German Navy) with the loss of two of her crew.
Benha	Egypt	World War I: The sailing vessel was shelled and sunk in the Mediterranean Sea off Ras el Dabas by an enemy submarine.
Rye Cliff	United States	The 137-foot (42 m) sidewheel paddle steamer, a ferry, was destroyed by fire while moored at a pier just off Sea Cliff Park in Sea Cliff, Long Island, New York.
Sarasota	United States	The dredge was blown ashore in a gale, probably at Port Sponge, Florida. The vessel was refloated the next day.

== 29 September ==
List of shipwrecks: 29 September 1918
Ship	State	Description
Libourne	United Kingdom	World War I: The cargo ship was torpedoed and sunk in the English Channel 10 nautical miles (19 km) south of The Lizard, Cornwall (49°47′N 5°10′W) by SM U-54 (Imperial German Navy) with the loss of three crew.
USS Minnesota	United States Navy	World War I: The Connecticut-class battleship struck a mine in the Atlantic Ocean 20 nautical miles (37 km) off the Fenwick Island Lighthouse, Delaware and was severely damaged. She was subsequently repaired and returned to service.
HMML 247	Royal Navy	The motor launch was lost on this date.
Nyanza	United Kingdom	World War I: The cargo ship was torpedoed and sunk in the Irish Sea 10 nautical miles (19 km) north west by west of the Corsewall Lighthouse, Wigtownshire by SM UB-95 (Imperial German Navy) with the loss of thirteen of her crew.
SM UB-115	Imperial German Navy	World War I: The Type UB III submarine was depth charged and sunk in the North Sea 4.5 nautical miles (8.3 km) off Newton-by-the-Sea, Northumberland, United Kingdom (55°13′N 1°22′E by HMS Ouse, HMS Star, HMT Viola (all Royal Navy) and the R23X-class airship R27 (Royal Air Force) with the loss of all 39 crew.

== 30 September ==
List of shipwrecks: 30 September 1918
Ship	State	Description
Atlantico	Portugal	World War I: The barque was shelled and sunk in the Atlantic Ocean 6 nautical miles (11 km) west of the Bishop Rock, Isles of Scilly, United Kingdom (49°50′N 6°35′W) by SM UB-112 (Imperial German Navy).
Francesco Padre	Italy	World War I: The sailing vessel was sunk in the Gulf of Salerno by SM UC-53 (Imperial German Navy).
Gabriela Costela	Italy	World War I: The sailing vessel was sunk in the Gulf of Salerno by SM UC-53 (Imperial German Navy).
Giovanni Costa	Italy	World War I: The sailing vessel was sunk in the Gulf of Salerno by SM UC-53 (Imperial German Navy).
San Francesco P.	Italy	World War I: The sailing vessel was sunk in the Gulf of Salerno by SM UC-53 (Imperial German Navy).
HMS Seagull	Royal Navy	The minesweeper, a converted Sharpshooter-class torpedo gunboat, collided with another vessel and sank in the River Clyde.
HMT Sealark II	Royal Navy	The naval trawler collided with another vessel and sank off St John's Point, County Donegal.
USS Ticonderoga	United States Navy	World War I: The transport ship was shelled, torpedoed and sunk in the Atlantic Ocean (43°05′N 38°43′W) by SM U-152 (Imperial German Navy) with the loss of 213 of the 237 people on board, 112 crew and 101 troops. Two of the survivors were taken as prisoners of war, the rest were rescued by Moorish Prince (United Kingdom).
SM U-102	Imperial German Navy	World War I: The Type U 57 submarine struck a mine and sank in the North Sea east of the Orkney Islands, United Kingdom with the loss of all 42 crew.
SM UB-127	Imperial German Navy	World War I: The Type UB III submarine struck a mine and sank in the Atlantic Ocean south of Fair Isle, United Kingdom with the loss of all 34 crew.

== Unknown date ==
List of shipwrecks: Unknown date 1918
Ship	State	Description
Blackford	United States	The cargo ship either sprung a leak 250 miles (400 km) south of Magdalena Bay on 17 September, eventually drifting ashore at Mazatlán, Mexico a total loss, or foundered 125 miles (201 km) off Cape St. Lucas in a hurricane on 26 September.
SM UB-104	Imperial German Navy	World War I: The Type UB III submarine was lost in Lyme Bay on or after 17 September with the loss of all 36 crew.
