= Bogstad (disambiguation) =

Bogstad is a Norwegian manor house.

Bogstad may also refer to:

- Adolf Bogstad (1920–1945), Norwegian resistance leader in World War II
- Oda Maria Hove Bogstad (born 1996), Norwegian retired football goalkeeper
- SS Bogstad, a Norwegian cargo ship torpedoed and sunk in 1918
- Bogstadvannet (English: Lake Bogstad), a Norwegian lake
