= SM UB-104 =

German World War I submarine

- UB-148 at sea, a U-boat similar to UB-104.

History

German Empire
- Name: UB-104
- Ordered: 6 / 8 February 1917
- Builder: Blohm & Voss, Hamburg
- Cost: 3,714,000 German Papiermark
- Yard number: 310
- Launched: 1 September 1917
- Commissioned: 15 March 1918
- Fate: Sunk by mine on 19 September 1918

General characteristics
- Class & type: Type UB III submarine
- Displacement: 519 t (511 long tons) surfaced; 649 t (639 long tons) submerged
- Length: 55.30 m (181 ft 5 in) (o/a)
- Beam: 5.80 m (19 ft)
- Draught: 3.70 m (12 ft 2 in)
- Propulsion: 2 × propeller shaft; 2 × MAN-Vulcan four-stroke 6-cylinder diesel engines, 1,085 bhp (809 kW); 2 × Siemens-Schuckert electric motors, 780 shp (580 kW)
- Speed: 13.3 knots (24.6 km/h; 15.3 mph) surfaced; 7.5 knots (13.9 km/h; 8.6 mph) submerged
- Range: 7,420 nmi (13,740 km; 8,540 mi) at 6 knots (11 km/h; 6.9 mph) surfaced; 55 nmi (102 km; 63 mi) at 4 knots (7.4 km/h; 4.6 mph) submerged
- Test depth: 50 m (160 ft)
- Complement: 3 officers, 31 men
- Armament: 5 × 50 cm (19.7 in) torpedo tubes (4 bow, 1 stern); 10 torpedoes; 1 × 8.8 cm (3.46 in) deck gun

Service record
- Part of: Flandern II Flotilla; 24 July – 21 September 1918
- Commanders: Oblt.z.S. Ernst Berlin; 15 March – 26 July 1918; Oblt.z.S. Thomas Bieber; 27 July – 21 September 1918
- Operations: 3 patrols
- Victories: 11 merchant ships sunk (15,958 GRT)

SM UB-104 was a German Type UB III submarine or U-boat in the German Imperial Navy (German: Kaiserliche Marine) during World War I. She was commissioned into the German Imperial Navy on 15 March 1918 as SM UB-104. (Note: "SM" stands for "Seiner Majestät" (English: His Majesty's) and combined with the U for Unterseeboot would be translated as His Majesty's Submarine.)

UB-104 was sunk by mine in at the Northern Barrage on 19 September 1918.

== Construction ==
She was built by Blohm & Voss of Hamburg and following just under a year of construction, launched at Hamburg on 1 September 1917. UB-104 was commissioned later the same year under the command of Oblt.z.S. Ernst Berlin. Like all Type UB III submarines, UB-104 carried 10 torpedoes and was armed with a 8.8 cm (3.46 in) deck gun. UB-104 would carry a crew of up to 3 officer and 31 men and had a cruising range of 7,420 nautical miles (13,740 km; 8,540 mi). UB-104 had a displacement of 519 t (511 long tons) while surfaced and 649 t (639 long tons) when submerged. Her engines enabled her to travel at 13.3 knots (24.6 km/h; 15.3 mph) when surfaced and 7.4 knots (13.7 km/h; 8.5 mph) when submerged.

== Summary of raiding history ==
Date	Name	Nationality	Tonnage (Note: Tonnages are in gross register tons)	Fate
2 August 1918	Flevo X	Netherlands	111	Sunk
2 August 1918	Remke	Netherlands	193	Sunk
3 August 1918	Cambrai	France	963	Sunk
13 August 1918	Frida	Denmark	395	Sunk
13 August 1918	Jönköping 1	Sweden	1,546	Sunk
14 August 1918	Wallsend	United Kingdom	2,697	Sunk
14 September 1918	Gibel Hamam	United Kingdom	647	Sunk
15 September 1918	Kendal Castle	United Kingdom	3,885	Sunk
16 September 1918	Ethel	United Kingdom	2,336	Sunk
16 September 1918	Lord Stewart	United Kingdom	1,445	Sunk
17 September 1918	Ursa	Sweden	1,740	Sunk

== Bibliography ==
- Bendert, Harald (2000). Die UB-Boote der Kaiserlichen Marine, 1914-1918. Einsätze, Erfolge, Schicksal (in German). Hamburg: Verlag E.S. Mittler & Sohn GmbH. ISBN 3-8132-0713-7.
- Gröner, Erich; Jung, Dieter; Maass, Martin (1991). U-boats and Mine Warfare Vessels. German Warships 1815–1945. Vol. 2. Translated by Thomas, Keith; Magowan, Rachel. London: Conway Maritime Press. ISBN 0-85177-593-4.
- Rössler, Eberhard (1979). Die deutschen U-Boote und ihre Werften: eine Bilddokumentation über den deutschen U-Bootbau; in zwei Bänden (in German). Vol. I. Munich: Bernard & Graefe. ISBN 3-7637-5213-7.
