= SM UB-129 =

- UB-148 at sea, a U-boat similar to UB-129.

History

German Empire
- Name: UB-129
- Ordered: 6 / 8 February 1917
- Builder: AG Weser, Bremen
- Cost: 3,654,000 German Papiermark
- Yard number: 302
- Laid down: 21 August 1917
- Launched: 10 April 1918
- Commissioned: 11 May 1918
- Fate: Lost in the surrender of Austria-Hungary, 31 October 1918

General characteristics
- Class & type: Type UB III submarine
- Displacement: 512 t (504 long tons) surfaced; 643 t (633 long tons) submerged
- Length: 55.85 m (183 ft 3 in) (o/a)
- Beam: 5.80 m (19 ft)
- Draught: 3.72 m (12 ft 2 in)
- Propulsion: 2 × propeller shaft; 2 × Benz four-stroke 6-cylinder diesel engines, 1,050 bhp (780 kW); 2 × Schiffsunion electric motors, 780 shp (580 kW)
- Speed: 13.9 knots (25.7 km/h; 16.0 mph) surfaced; 7.6 knots (14.1 km/h; 8.7 mph) submerged
- Range: 7,280 nmi (13,480 km; 8,380 mi) at 6 knots (11 km/h; 6.9 mph) surfaced; 55 nmi (102 km; 63 mi) at 4 knots (7.4 km/h; 4.6 mph) submerged
- Test depth: 50 m (160 ft)
- Complement: 3 officers, 31 men
- Armament: 5 × 50 cm (19.7 in) torpedo tubes (4 bow, 1 stern); 10 torpedoes; 1 × 10.5 cm (4.13 in) deck gun

Service record
- Part of: Mittelmeer I Flotilla; 2 – 30 October 1918
- Commanders: Kptlt. Karl Neumann; 11 June – 30 October 1918
- Operations: 1 patrol
- Victories: 2 merchant ships sunk (5,098 GRT)

SM UB-129 was a German Type UB III submarine or U-boat in the German Imperial Navy (German: Kaiserliche Marine) during World War I. She was commissioned into the German Imperial Navy on 11 June 1918 as SM UB-129. (Note: "SM" stands for "Seiner Majestät" (English: His Majesty's) and combined with the U for Unterseeboot would be translated as His Majesty's Submarine.)

UB-129 was lost 31 October 1918 in Fiume (45°19′N 14°26′E) after the surrender of Austria-Hungary.

== Construction ==
She was built by AG Weser of Bremen and following just under a year of construction, launched at Bremen on 11 May 1918. UB-129 was commissioned later the same year under the command of Kptlt. Karl Neumann. Like all Type UB III submarines, UB-129 carried 10 torpedoes and was armed with a 10.5 cm (4.13 in) deck gun. UB-129 would carry a crew of up to 3 officer and 31 men and had a cruising range of 7,280 nautical miles (13,480 km; 8,380 mi). UB-129 had a displacement of 512 t (504 long tons) while surfaced and 643 t (633 long tons) when submerged. Her engines enabled her to travel at 13.9 knots (25.7 km/h; 16.0 mph) when surfaced and 7.6 knots (14.1 km/h; 8.7 mph) when submerged.

== Summary of raiding history ==
Date	Name	Nationality	Tonnage (Note: Tonnages are in gross register tons)	Fate
16 September 1918	Buenaventura	United States	4,881	Sunk
22 September 1918	Erik	Denmark	217	Sunk

== Bibliography ==
- Bendert, Harald (2000). Die UB-Boote der Kaiserlichen Marine, 1914–1918. Einsätze, Erfolge, Schicksal (in German). Hamburg: Verlag E.S. Mittler & Sohn GmbH. ISBN 3-8132-0713-7.
- Gröner, Erich; Jung, Dieter; Maass, Martin (1991). German Warships 1815–1945, U-boats and Mine Warfare Vessels. Vol. 2. Translated by Thomas, Keith; Magowan, Rachel. London: Conway Maritime Press. ISBN 0-85177-593-4.
- Rössler, Eberhard (1979). Die deutschen U-Boote und ihre Werften: eine Bilddokumentation über den deutschen U-Bootbau; in zwei Bänden (in German). Vol. I. Munich: Bernard & Graefe. ISBN 3-7637-5213-7.
