= SM U-27 (Austria-Hungary) =

Austro-Hungarian lead boat of U-27 class

- U-27 seen at her launch on 19 October 1916.

History

Austria-Hungary
- Name: SM U-27
- Ordered: 12 October 1915
- Builder: Cantiere Navale Triestino, Monfalcone
- Launched: 19 October 1916
- Commissioned: 24 February 1917
- Fate: Scrapped 1920

Service record
- Commanders: Robert Teufl von Fernland; 24 February – 29 December 1917; Josef Holub; 29 December 1917 – 31 October 1918
- Victories: 33 merchant ships sunk (14,325 GRT + Unknown GRT); 1 warship sunk (765 tons); 1 warship damaged (665 tons); 1 merchant ship taken as prize (Unknown GRT)

General characteristics
- Type: U-27-class submarine
- Displacement: 264 t (260 long tons) surfaced; 301 t (296 long tons) submerged
- Length: 121 ft 1 in (36.91 m)
- Beam: 14 ft 4 in (4.37 m)
- Draft: 12 ft 2 in (3.71 m)
- Propulsion: 2 × shafts; 2 × diesel engine, 270 bhp (200 kW) total; 2 × electric motor, 280 shp (210 kW) total
- Speed: 9 knots (17 km/h) surfaced; 7.5 knots (14 km/h) submerged
- Complement: 23–24
- Armament: 2 × 45 cm (17.7 in) bow torpedo tubes; 4 torpedoes; 1 × 75 mm/26 (3.0 in) deck gun; 1 × 8 mm (0.31 in) machine gun

SM U-27 or U-XXVII was the lead boat of the U-27 class of U-boats or submarines for the Austro-Hungarian Navy. U-27 was built by the Austrian firm of Cantiere Navale Triestino (CNT) at the Pola Navy Yard and launched on 19 October 1916. She was commissioned on 24 February 1917.

She had a single hull and was just over 121 feet (37 m) in length. She displaced nearly 265 metric tons (261 long tons) when surfaced and over 300 metric tons (295 long tons) when submerged. Her two diesel engines moved her at up to 9 knots (17 km/h) on the surface, while her twin electric motors propelled her at up to 7.5 knots (13.9 km/h) while underwater. She was armed with two bow torpedo tubes and could carry a load of up to four torpedoes. She was also equipped with a 75 mm (3.0 in) deck gun and a machine gun.

During her service career, U-27 sank the British destroyer Phoenix, damaged the Japanese destroyer Sakaki, and sank or captured 34 other ships totaling 14,325 GRT. U-27 was surrendered at Pola at war's end and handed over to Italy as a war reparation in 1919. She was broken up the following year. Conway's All the World's Fighting Ships 1906–1921 calls U-27 Austria-Hungary's "most successful submarine".

== Design and construction ==
Austria-Hungary's U-boat fleet was largely obsolete at the outbreak of World War I. The Austro-Hungarian Navy satisfied its most urgent needs by purchasing five Type UB I submarines that comprised the U-10 class from Germany, by raising and recommissioning the sunken French submarine Curie as U-14, (Note: Curie had been caught in an anti-submarine net while trying to enter the harbor at Pola on 20 December 1914. See: Gardiner, p. 343.) and by building four submarines of the U-20 class that were based on the 1911 Danish Havmanden class. (Note: The plans for the Danish Havmanden-class submarines, three of which were built in Austria-Hungary, were seized from Whitehead & Co. in Fiume. See: Gardiner, pp. 344, 354.)

After these steps alleviated their most urgent needs, the Austro-Hungarian Navy selected the German Type UB II design for its newest submarines in mid 1915. The Germans were reluctant to allocate any of their wartime resources to Austro-Hungarian construction, but were willing to sell plans for up to six of the UB II boats to be constructed under license in Austria-Hungary. The Navy agreed to the proposal and purchased the plans from AG Weser of Bremen.

U-27 displaced 264 metric tons (260 long tons) surfaced and 301 metric tons (296 long tons) submerged. She had a single hull with saddle tanks, and was 121 feet 1 inch (36.91 m) long with a beam of 14 feet 4 inches (4.37 m) and a draft of 12 feet 2 inches (3.71 m). For propulsion, she had two shafts, twin diesel engines of 270 bhp (200 kW) for surface running, and twin electric motors of 280 shp (210 kW) for submerged travel. She was capable of 9 knots (16.7 km/h) while surfaced and 7.5 knots (13.9 km/h) while submerged. Although there is no specific notation of a range for U-27, the German UB II boats, upon which the U-27 class was based, had a range of over 6,000 nautical miles (11,000 km) at 5 knots (9.3 km/h) surfaced, and 45 nautical miles (83 km) at 4 knots (7.4 km/h) submerged. U-27 class boats were designed for a crew of 23–24.

U-27 was armed with two 45 cm (17.7 in) bow torpedo tubes and carried a complement of four torpedoes. She was also equipped with a 75 mm/26 (3.0 in) deck gun and an 8 mm (0.31 in) machine gun.

After intricate political negotiations to allocate production of the class between Austrian and Hungarian firms, U-27 was ordered from Cantiere Navale Triestino (CNT) on 12 October 1915. She was laid down by early 1916 at the Pola Navy Yard, (Note: By this time, the CNT shipyards at Monfalcone had been overrun by the Italian Army. See: Baumgartner and Sieche, as excerpted here (reprinted and translated into English by Sieche). Retrieved 17 January 2008.) and launched on 19 October.

== Service career ==
After her completion, U-27 was commissioned into the Austro-Hungarian Navy on 24 February 1917 under the command of Linienschiffsleutnant Robert Teufl von Fernland. Previously in command of U-11, von Fernland was 31-year-old native of Vienna. In April, von Fernland and U-27 both achieved their first kills. On 12 April, U-27 encountered the 3,756 GRT Greek steamship Niritos sailing from Genoa for Port Said. About 5 nautical miles (9.3 km; 5.8 mi) off Augusta, Sicily, U-27 shelled and sank the 11-year-old Greek ship. Four days later, von Fernland torpedoed another Greek steamer, the 2,976 GRT Zinovia. Carrying coal from Barry for Taranto, Zinovia was sent to the bottom 5 nautical miles (9.3 km) from Cape Rizzuto.

In mid-May 1917, U-27 participated in a support role in a raid on the Otranto Barrage that precipitated the Battle of Otranto Straits. On the night of 14/15 May, the Austro-Hungarian cruisers Helgoland, Saida, and Novara attacked the drifters that deployed the anti-submarine nets that formed part of the Barrage, sinking 14, damaging 5, and taking 72 prisoners. (Note: Joseph Watt, the commander of the British drifter Gowan Lea, was awarded the Victoria Cross for his actions in refusing to surrender to one of the Austrian cruisers.) Destroyers Csepel and Balaton were sent to simultaneously attack Italian transports shuttling between Italy and Valona, and sank an Italian destroyer and a munitions ship. U-27, which was assigned to patrol between Brindisi and Cattaro, was a part of a force of three U-boats intended to intercept British and Italian ships responding to the attacks; the other two were the Austro-Hungarian U-4 (which was posted near Valona) and the German UC-25 (assigned to mine Brindisi). A squadron of British cruisers and Italian and French destroyers joined the battle against the Austro-Hungarian cruisers on 15 May. Several ships on each side were damaged by the time the engagement was broken off. As a result of the attacks the drifter line of the Barrage was moved farther south and maintained only during the day, a success for the Central Powers. U-27 did not take any offensive action during the raid and ensuing battle.

On 9 June, U-27 sank Roland, a French sailing ship, off the Greek island of Cerigo (Kythira). Two days later, von Fernland torpedoed the Japanese destroyer Sakaki between Cerigotto (Antikythera) and Meles. Sakaki was one of eight Kaba-class destroyers that were part of the Japanese contribution to the Allied effort in the Mediterranean. Although the Japanese ships often performed escort service for British troop convoys, Helgason does not report whether Sakaki was engaged in that duty when she was attacked. Even though 68 Japanese sailors perished in the attack, nearly two-thirds the complement of a typical Kaba-class ship, Sakaki remained afloat, was repaired, and remained in service. On 29 December, Linienschiffsleutnant Josef Holub replaced von Fernland as commander of U-27. Holub, a 32-year-old Czech, had previously been in command of U-21 and U-22. Holub recorded his first victory with U-27 in January 1918. While near Marca, Sirocco, the U-boat torpedoed and sank the Italian steamer Andrea Costa on 22 January. The 3,991 GRT Andrea Costa had sailed from Rangoon, but was sunk just short of her destination of Malta. A little more than four months would pass before Holub and U-27 would score their next success.

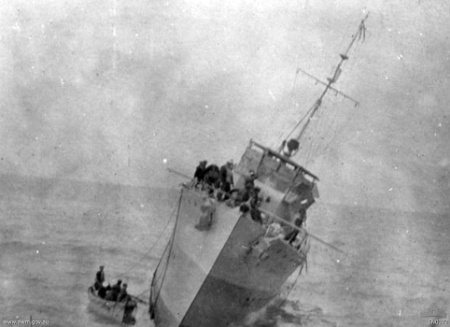
HMS Phoenix lists to port after being torpedoed, viewed from HMAS Warrego

From late April to early May, U-27 sank six small ships—five Greek and one Italian—including three on one day, 6 May. All of the ships with reported tonnages were under 50 GRT. U-27 torpedoed the British destroyer Phoenix at 09:18 on 14 May with the loss of one stoker and one artificer. Phoenix had been attached to the group of ships patrolling the Otranto Barrage when she was torpedoed amidships on the starboard side. Although she survived the initial attack, Phoenix was listing badly and taking on large quantities of water. An attempt was made by Australian destroyer Warrego to tow Phoenix to safety but by 12:45 she was in danger of capsizing and her crew were removed. Phoenix eventually sank at 13:10 in position 40°23′30″N 19°14′00″E. From 3 to 11 July, U-27 sank another nine ships, the largest reported being the 53 GRT sailing vessel Tris Adelphi. U-27 dispatched three of the ships on 3 July, and sank two each on 10 and 11 July. On 13 August, U-27 attacked the 2,209 GRT British steamer Anhui. The 15-year-old ship was en route from Famagusta to Port Said, when U-27 torpedoed her 2 nautical miles (3.7 km) off Crete. Four persons on Anhui died when the ship with her general cargo went down.

U-27's next victims were all encountered in mid-September. On 11 September, the French sailing ship Antoinette was seized as a prize and towed into the port of Beyrouth. Starting three days later, Holub and U-27 sent an additional twelve small ships to the bottom, including the final six all on 20 September. Except for the two largest ships—the 113 GRT Agios Nicolas and the 103 GRT Theologos—none were over 60 GRT.

At the war's end, U-27 was in port at Pola. The U-boat was surrendered to Italy as a war reparation in 1919 and was scrapped at Fiume in 1920. In addition to the sinking and damaging of two destroyers, she sank or captured 34 merchant ships totaling 14,325 GRT. Conway's All the World's Fighting Ships 1906–1921 calls U-27 Austria-Hungary's "most successful submarine".

== Summary of raiding history ==
Ships sunk or damaged by SM U-27
Date	Name	Nationality	Tonnage (Note: Merchant ship tonnages are in gross register tons. Military vessels are listed by tons displacement.)	Fate
12 April 1917	Niritos	Greece	3,756	Sunk
16 April 1917	Zinovia	Greece	2,976	Sunk
9 June 1917	Roland	France	703	Sunk
11 June 1917	Sakaki	Imperial Japanese Navy	665	Damaged
22 January 1918	Andrea Costa	Kingdom of Italy	3,991	Sunk
29 April 1918	Maria	Greece	40	Sunk
1 May 1918	San Nicola	Kingdom of Italy	unknown	Sunk
3 May 1918	Panaghia	Greece	unknown	Sunk
6 May 1918	Agios Dimitrios	Greece	40	Sunk
6 May 1918	Evangelistria	Greece	46	Sunk
6 May 1918	Taxiarchis	Greece	40	Sunk
14 May 1918	HMS Phoenix	Royal Navy	765	Sunk
3 July 1918	Agia Trias	Greece	14	Sunk
3 July 1918	Evangelistria	Greece	unknown	Sunk
3 July 1918	Panaghia	Greece	12	Sunk
6 July 1918	San Nicola	Kingdom of Italy	29	Sunk
9 July 1918	Tris Adelphi	Greece	53	Sunk
10 July 1918	Agios Georgios	Greece	17	Sunk
10 July 1918	Agios Loukis	Greece	11	Sunk
11 July 1918	Agios Constantinos	Greece	14	Sunk
11 July 1918	Marigo	Greece	unknown	Sunk
13 August 1918	Anhui	United Kingdom	2,209	Sunk
11 September 1918	Antoinette	France	unknown	Captured as prize
14 September 1918	Agios Nicolas	United Kingdom	113	Sunk
17 September 1918	Portaritissa	Kingdom of Italy	16	Sunk
17 September 1918	Sofia	Kingdom of Italy	6	Sunk
18 September 1918	Adelphotis	Greece	26	Sunk
18 September 1918	Agios Amma	Greece	16	Sunk
19 September 1918	Agios Spiridion	Greece	58	Sunk
20 September 1918	Aghios Nicolaos	Greece	unknown	Sunk
20 September 1918	Agios Nicolas	Greece	13	Sunk
20 September 1918	Agios Spiridion	Greece	18	Sunk
20 September 1918	Dragonos	Greece	unknown	Sunk
20 September 1918	Prof. Elias	Greece	5	Sunk
20 September 1918	Theologos	Greece	103	Sunk
		Sunk: Damaged: Total:	15,090; 665; 15,755	

== Bibliography ==
- Baumgartner, Lothar; Erwin Sieche (1999). Die Schiffe der k.(u.)k. Kriegsmarine im Bild = Austro-Hungarian warships in photographs (in German). Wien: Verlagsbuchhandlung Stöhr. ISBN 978-3-901208-25-6. OCLC 43596931.
- Gardiner, Robert; Gray, Randal, eds. (1985). Conway's All the World's Fighting Ships 1906–1921. Annapolis, Maryland: Naval Institute Press. ISBN 978-0-87021-907-8. OCLC 12119866.
- Gibson, R. H.; Prendergast, Maurice (2003) [1931]. The German Submarine War, 1914–1918. Annapolis, Maryland: Naval Institute Press. ISBN 978-1-59114-314-7. OCLC 52924732.
- Gilbert, Martin (2004) [1994]. The First World War: A Complete History. New York: Owl Books. ISBN 978-0-8050-7617-2. OCLC 57246229.
- Halpern, Paul G. (1994). A Naval History of World War I. Annapolis, Maryland: Naval Institute Press. ISBN 978-0-87021-266-6. OCLC 28411665.
- Hepper, David (2006). British Warship Losses in the Ironclad Era 1860 – 1919. London: Chatham Publishing. ISBN 978-1-86176-273-3.
- Miller, David (2002). The Illustrated Directory of Submarines of the World. St. Paul, Minnesota: MBI Pub. Co. ISBN 978-0-7603-1345-9. OCLC 50208951.
