= SM UB-115 =

German Type UB III submarine

- UB-148 at sea, a U-boat similar to UB-115.

History

German Empire
- Name: UB-115
- Ordered: 6 / 8 February 1917
- Builder: Blohm & Voss, Hamburg
- Cost: 3,714,000 German Papiermark
- Yard number: 321
- Launched: 4 November 1917
- Commissioned: 28 May 1918
- Fate: Sunk 29 September 1918

General characteristics
- Class & type: Type UB III submarine
- Displacement: 519 t (511 long tons) surfaced; 649 t (639 long tons) submerged
- Length: 55.30 m (181 ft 5 in) (o/a)
- Beam: 5.80 m (19 ft)
- Draught: 3.70 m (12 ft 2 in)
- Propulsion: 2 × propeller shaft; 2 × MAN-Vulcan four-stroke 6-cylinder diesel engines, 1,085 bhp (809 kW); 2 × AEG electric motors, 780 shp (580 kW)
- Speed: 13.3 knots (24.6 km/h; 15.3 mph) surfaced; 7.5 knots (13.9 km/h; 8.6 mph) submerged
- Range: 7,420 nmi (13,740 km; 8,540 mi) at 6 knots (11 km/h; 6.9 mph) surfaced; 55 nmi (102 km; 63 mi) at 4 knots (7.4 km/h; 4.6 mph) submerged
- Test depth: 50 m (160 ft)
- Complement: 3 officers, 31 men
- Armament: 5 × 50 cm (19.7 in) torpedo tubes (4 bow, 1 stern); 10 torpedoes; 1 × 10.5 cm (4.13 in) deck gun

Service record
- Part of: Flandern I Flotilla; 3 – 29 September 1918
- Commanders: Oblt.z.S. Reinhold Thomsen; 28 May – 29 September 1918
- Operations: 2 patrols
- Victories: 1 merchant ship sunk (336 GRT)

SM UB-115 was a German Type UB III submarine or U-boat in the German Imperial Navy (German: Kaiserliche Marine) during World War I. She was commissioned into the German Imperial Navy on 28 May 1918 as SM UB-115. (Note: "SM" stands for "Seiner Majestät" (English: His Majesty's) and combined with the U for Unterseeboot would be translated as His Majesty's Submarine.) She was the only German submarine commissioned with the number 115.

UB-115 was sunk by British warships, including HMS Ouse and HMS Star, and the rigid airship R29 at 55°13′N 1°22′W using depth charges and aerial bombs.

== Construction ==
She was built by Blohm & Voss of Hamburg and following just under a year of construction, launched at Hamburg on 4 November 1917. UB-115 was commissioned in the spring the next year under the command of Oblt.z.S. Reinhold Thomsen. Like all Type UB III submarines, UB-115 carried 10 torpedoes and was armed with a 8.8 cm (3.46 in) deck gun. UB-115 would carry a crew of up to 3 officers and 31 men and had a cruising range of 7,420 nautical miles (13,740 km; 8,540 mi). UB-115 had a displacement of 519 t (511 long tons) while surfaced and 649 t (639 long tons) when submerged. Her engines enabled her to travel at 13.3 knots (24.6 km/h; 15.3 mph) when surfaced and 7.4 knots (13.7 km/h; 8.5 mph) when submerged.

== Fate ==
On 29 September 1918 while under the command of Reinhold Thomsen, UB-115 was engaged by armed trawlers (amongst others Viola), the airship R29, HMS Ouse and HMS Star. UB-115 was depth charged until destroyed and went down at position 55°14′46″N 1°22′45″W (WGS84), about 4.5 nautical miles (8.3 km; 5.2 mi) northeast of Beacon Point, Newton-by-the-Sea, off Northumberland. All 39 men aboard the submarine died in the attack and sinking.

UB-115's wreck lies in two pieces and is covered in soft corals and an accretion formed from fly ash from a local power plant.

== Summary of raiding history ==
Date	Name	Nationality	Tonnage (Note: Tonnages are in gross register tons)	Fate
21 September 1918	Staithes	United Kingdom	336	Sunk

== Bibliography ==
- Bendert, Harald (2000). Die UB-Boote der Kaiserlichen Marine, 1914–1918. Einsätze, Erfolge, Schicksal (in German). Hamburg: Verlag E.S. Mittler & Sohn GmbH. ISBN 3-8132-0713-7.
- Gröner, Erich; Jung, Dieter; Maass, Martin (1991). German Warships 1815–1945, U-boats and Mine Warfare Vessels. Vol. 2. Translated by Thomas, Keith; Magowan, Rachel. London: Conway Maritime Press. ISBN 0-85177-593-4.
- Rössler, Eberhard (1979). Die deutschen U-Boote und ihre Werften: eine Bilddokumentation über den deutschen U-Bootbau; in zwei Bänden (in German). Vol. I. Munich: Bernard & Graefe. ISBN 3-7637-5213-7.
