= SM UB-117 =

WWI-era Imperial German Navy U-boat

- UB-148 at sea, a U-boat similar to UB-117.

History

German Empire
- Name: UB-117
- Ordered: 6 / 8 February 1917
- Builder: Blohm & Voss, Hamburg
- Cost: 3,714,000 German Papiermark
- Yard number: 323
- Launched: 21 November 1917
- Commissioned: 6 May 1918
- Fate: Surrendered 26 November 1918, broken up in 1919 / 20

General characteristics
- Class & type: Type UB III submarine
- Displacement: 519 t (511 long tons) surfaced; 649 t (639 long tons) submerged
- Length: 55.30 m (181 ft 5 in) (o/a)
- Beam: 5.80 m (19 ft)
- Draught: 3.70 m (12 ft 2 in)
- Propulsion: 2 × propeller shaft; 2 × MAN-Vulcan four-stroke 6-cylinder diesel engines, 1,085 bhp (809 kW); 2 × AEG electric motors, 780 shp (580 kW)
- Speed: 13.3 knots (24.6 km/h; 15.3 mph) surfaced; 7.5 knots (13.9 km/h; 8.6 mph) submerged
- Range: 7,420 nmi (13,740 km; 8,540 mi) at 6 knots (11 km/h; 6.9 mph) surfaced; 55 nmi (102 km; 63 mi) at 4 knots (7.4 km/h; 4.6 mph) submerged
- Test depth: 50 m (160 ft)
- Complement: 3 officers, 31 men
- Armament: 5 × 50 cm (19.7 in) torpedo tubes (4 bow, 1 stern); 10 torpedoes; 1 × 10.5 cm (4.13 in) deck gun

Service record
- Part of: Flandern I Flotilla; 24 August – 4 October 1918; II Flotilla; 4 October – 11 November 1918
- Commanders: Kptlt. Erwin Waßner; 6 June – 11 November 1918
- Operations: 3 patrols
- Victories: 5 merchant ships sunk (9,342 GRT)

SM UB-117 was a German Type UB III submarine or U-boat in the Imperial German Navy during World War I. She was commissioned into the Imperial German Navy on 6 May 1918 as SM UB-117. (Note: "SM" stands for "Seiner Majestät" (English: His Majesty's) and combined with the U for Unterseeboot would be translated as His Majesty's Submarine.)

UB-117 was surrendered to the British on 26 November 1918 and broken up in Felixstowe in 1919 / 20.

== Construction ==
She was built by Blohm & Voss of Hamburg and following just under a year of construction, launched at Hamburg on 21 November 1917. UB-117 was commissioned in the spring the next year under the command of Kptlt. Erwin Waßner. Like all Type UB III submarines, UB-117 carried 10 torpedoes and was armed with a 10.5 cm (4.13 in) deck gun. UB-117 would carry a crew of up to 3 officer and 31 men and had a cruising range of 7,420 nautical miles (13,740 km; 8,540 mi). UB-117 had a displacement of 519 t (511 long tons) while surfaced and 649 t (639 long tons) when submerged. Her engines enabled her to travel at 13.3 knots (24.6 km/h; 15.3 mph) when surfaced and 7.4 knots (13.7 km/h; 8.5 mph) when submerged.

== Summary of raiding history ==
Date	Name	Nationality	Tonnage (Note: Tonnages are in gross register tons)	Fate
16 September 1918	Acadian	United Kingdom	2,305	Sunk
17 September 1918	Lavernock	United Kingdom	2,406	Sunk
18 September 1918	Buffalo	France	2,359	Sunk
18 September 1918	John O. Scott	United Kingdom	1,235	Sunk
18 September 1918	Primo	United Kingdom	1,037	Sunk

== Bibliography ==
- Gröner, Erich; Jung, Dieter; Maass, Martin (1991). U-boats and Mine Warfare Vessels. German Warships 1815–1945. Vol. 2. Translated by Thomas, Keith; Magowan, Rachel. London: Conway Maritime Press. ISBN 0-85177-593-4.
- Bendert, Harald (2000). Die UB-Boote der Kaiserlichen Marine, 1914-1918. Einsätze, Erfolge, Schicksal (in German). Hamburg: Verlag E.S. Mittler & Sohn GmbH. ISBN 3-8132-0713-7.
- Rössler, Eberhard (1979). Die deutschen U-Boote und ihre Werften: eine Bilddokumentation über den deutschen U-Bootbau; in zwei Bänden (in German). Vol. I. Munich: Bernard & Graefe. ISBN 3-7637-5213-7.
