= HMS Phoenix (1911) =

Destroyer of the Royal Navy

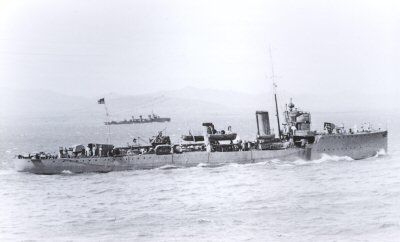
- HMS Phoenix

History

United Kingdom
- Name: HMS Phoenix
- Builder: Vickers Limited of Barrow-in-Furness
- Launched: 9 October 1911
- Fate: Sunk on 14 May 1918

General characteristics
- Class & type: Acheron-class destroyer
- Displacement: 990 tons
- Length: 75 m (246 ft)
- Beam: 7.8 m (26 ft)
- Draught: 2.7 m (8.9 ft)
- Propulsion: Three shaft Parsons turbines; Three oil-fired Yarrow boilers; 13,500 shp (10,100 kW)
- Speed: 28 knots (52 km/h; 32 mph)
- Complement: 72
- Armament: 2 × BL 4-inch (101.6 mm) L/40 Mark VIII guns, mounting P Mark V; 2 × QF 12-pounder 12 cwt naval gun, mounting P Mark I; 2 × single tubes for 21-inch (533 mm) torpedoes

HMS Phoenix was an Acheron-class destroyer of the British Royal Navy. She is named for the mythical bird, and was the fifteenth ship of the Royal Navy to bear the name. She was the only British warship ever to be sunk by the Austro-Hungarian Navy.

== Pennant numbers ==
Pennant Number	From	To
H75	6 December 1914	Unknown
H94	Unknown	Sunk 14 May 1918

== Design ==
The Acheron class (redesignated the I class in October 1913) was an improved version of the Acorn-class destroyer which had been built for the Royal Navy under the 1909–1910 shipbuilding programme. Fourteen destroyers were ordered for the Royal Navy to the standard Admiralty design, with six more as 'builder's specials', to the design of specialist destroyer shipyards, later followed by three more high-speed specials and six for Australia.

The Acherons were 246 ft (74.98 m) long overall, with a beam of 25 feet 8 inches (7.82 m) and a draught of 9 feet (2.7 m). Displacement was about 773 long tons (785 t) legend and 990 long tons (1,010 t)} deep load. Three Yarrow water-tube boilers fed steam to Parsons steam turbines which drove three shafts. The machinery was rated at 13,500 shaft horsepower (10,100 kW), giving a speed of 27 knots (31 mph; 50 km/h). Two funnels were fitted.

The ships were armed with two 4-inch (102 mm) BL Mk VIII on the centreline and two 12-pounder 12 cwt (Note: 12 cwt refers to the weight of the gun in hundredweights) guns on the ship's beam. Two single 21-inch (533 mm) torpedo tubes were fitted. The ships had a complement of 72 men.

Phoenix was laid down at Vickers' Barrow-in-Furness shipyard on 4 January 1911, was launched on 9 October 1911 and was completed in May 1912.

== Career ==
At the beginning of the First World War, Phoenix was part of the First Destroyer Flotilla operating in the North Sea. She and her sisters were attached to the Grand Fleet as soon as the war started.

=== Action on 16 August 1914 ===
On 16 August 1914, within days of the outbreak of war, the First Destroyer Flotilla engaged an enemy cruiser off the mouth of the Elbe, which is reported with great verve by an author writing under the pseudonym "Clinker Knocker" in 1938:

On Aug 16th we had our first brush with the enemy, and our flotilla received a sample of German gunnery which our own gunners acknowledged was excellent. We were on our usual Dutch coast patrol, known as the 'broad fourteens' and were somewhere off the mouth of the river Elbe off the German coast. At daybreak we chased a German collier and made contact with a powerful armoured cruiser, which opened fire on us with 8.2 inch guns. Our heaviest gun was four-inch, so the enemy easily outranged us, and straddled us with her accurate salvo firing. The Goshawk and Phoenix were disabled, and shells were ricochetting over us. Fearless led us in a determined attack to close with torpedoes, but the large German Cruiser foiled our intentions by running for home, and we did not blame her. We were very disappointed, however at not being able to equalise matters with the third flotilla, but the Yorch or Roon or whichever ship it may have been was too near home for us to follow, and we left the vicinity after the Goshawk and Phoenix had patched up their wounds.

— Aye, Aye, Sir, a saga of the lower deck by Clinker Knocker

=== The Battle of Heligoland Bight ===
She was present with First Destroyer Flotilla on 28 August 1914 at the Battle of Heligoland Bight, led by the light cruiser Fearless. Phoenix suffered one man wounded during the action

=== The Battle of Dogger Bank ===
On 24 January 1915 Phoenix took part in the Battle of Dogger Bank, and her crew shared in the Prize Money for the German armoured cruiser Blücher.

=== The Battle of Jutland ===
Phoenix was not present with her flotilla at the Battle of Jutland on 31 May 1916.

=== HMAT Ballarat ===
Phoenix was escorting the Australian troopship Ballarat when she was attacked by a German submarine on Anzac Day (25 April) 1917 in the English Channel. Although efforts were made to tow Ballarat to shallow water, she sank off The Lizard the following morning. No people died of the 1,752 souls on board, a striking testament to the calmness and discipline of the troops.

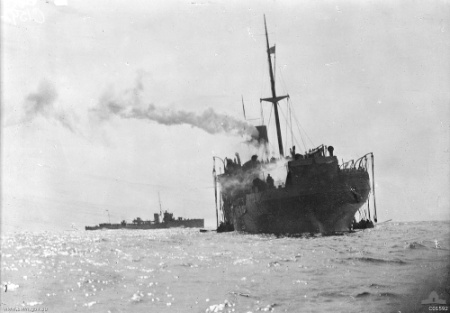
HMAT Ballarat sinking, Phoenix to the left

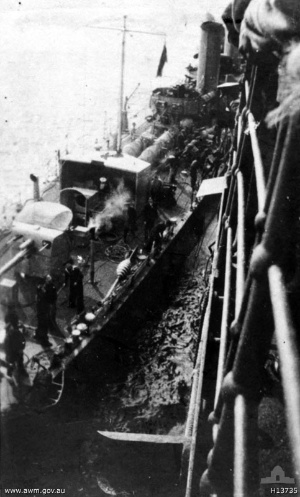
Phoenix alongside Ballarat

=== Mediterranean Service ===
In September 1917, Phoenix transferred to the Fifth Destroyer Flotilla which was operating in the Mediterranean. This posting was to be her last.

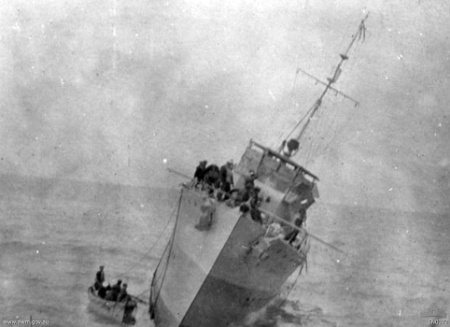
HMS Phoenix lists to port after being torpedoed, viewed from HMAS Warrego

== Loss ==
At 9:18 on 14 May 1918, while patrolling the Otranto Barrage, the Phoenix was torpedoed amidships by the Austro-Hungarian submarine SM U-27, at position 40°12′30″N 18°52′12″E. HMAS Warrego made an unsuccessful attempt to tow her to Valona (now Vlorë in Albania), but she sank within sight of the port at 13:10 in position 40°23.5′N 19°14′E. The crew had been taken off before she capsized, and there were only two fatalities.
