= SM UB-95 =

- UB-148 at sea, a U-boat similar to UB-95.

History

German Empire
- Name: UB-95
- Ordered: 6 / 8 February 1917
- Builder: AG Vulcan, Hamburg
- Cost: 3,654,000 German Papiermark
- Yard number: 111
- Launched: 10 May 1918
- Commissioned: 20 June 1918
- Fate: Surrendered 21 November 1918, broken up

General characteristics
- Class & type: Type UB III submarine
- Displacement: 510 t (500 long tons) surfaced; 640 t (630 long tons) submerged
- Length: 55.52 m (182 ft 2 in) (o/a)
- Beam: 5.76 m (18 ft 11 in)
- Draught: 3.73 m (12 ft 3 in)
- Propulsion: 2 × propeller shaft; 2 × MAN-Vulcan four-stroke 6-cylinder diesel engines, 1,085 bhp (809 kW); 2 × Siemens-Schuckert electric motors, 780 shp (580 kW)
- Speed: 13 knots (24 km/h; 15 mph) surfaced; 7.4 knots (13.7 km/h; 8.5 mph) submerged
- Range: 7,120 nmi (13,190 km; 8,190 mi) at 6 knots (11 km/h; 6.9 mph) surfaced; 55 nmi (102 km; 63 mi) at 4 knots (7.4 km/h; 4.6 mph) submerged
- Test depth: 50 m (160 ft)
- Complement: 3 officers, 31 men
- Armament: 5 × 50 cm (19.7 in) torpedo tubes (4 bow, 1 stern); 10 torpedoes; 1 × 10.5 cm (4.13 in) deck gun

Service record
- Part of: II Flotilla; 13 September – 11 November 1918
- Commanders: Kptlt. Oscar Maaß; 20 June – 11 November 1918
- Operations: 1 patrol
- Victories: 1 merchant ship sunk (4,053 GRT)

SM UB-95 was a German Type UB III submarine or U-boat in the German Imperial Navy (German: Kaiserliche Marine) during World War I. She was commissioned into the German Imperial Navy on 20 June 1918 as SM UB-95. (Note: "SM" stands for "Seiner Majestät" (English: His Majesty's) and combined with the U for Unterseeboot would be translated as His Majesty's Submarine.)

UB-95 was surrendered to Italy on 21 November 1918 and broken up in La Spezia in August 1919.

== Construction ==
She was built by AG Vulcan of Hamburg and following just under a year of construction, launched at Hamburg on 10 May 1918. UB-95 was commissioned later the same year. Like all Type UB III submarines, UB-95 carried 10 torpedoes and was armed with a 10.5 cm (4.13 in) deck gun. UB-95 would carry a crew of up to 3 officer and 31 men and had a cruising range of 7,120 nautical miles (13,190 km; 8,190 mi). UB-95 had a displacement of 510 t (500 long tons) while surfaced and 640 t (630 long tons) when submerged. Her engines enabled her to travel at 13 knots (24 km/h; 15 mph) when surfaced and 7.4 knots (13.7 km/h; 8.5 mph) when submerged.

== Summary of raiding history ==
| Date | Name | Nationality | Tonnage (Note: Tonnages are in gross register tons) | Fate |
|---|---|---|---|---|
| 29 September 1918 | Nyanza | United Kingdom | 4,053 | Sunk |

== Bibliography ==
- Bendert, Harald (2000). Die UB-Boote der Kaiserlichen Marine, 1914-1918. Einsätze, Erfolge, Schicksal (in German). Hamburg: Verlag E.S. Mittler & Sohn GmbH. ISBN 3-8132-0713-7.
- Gröner, Erich; Jung, Dieter; Maass, Martin (1991). U-boats and Mine Warfare Vessels. German Warships 1815–1945. Vol. 2. Translated by Thomas, Keith; Magowan, Rachel. London: Conway Maritime Press. ISBN 0-85177-593-4.
- Rössler, Eberhard (1979). Die deutschen U-Boote und ihre Werften: eine Bilddokumentation über den deutschen U-Bootbau; in zwei Bänden (in German). Vol. I. Munich: Bernard & Graefe. ISBN 3-7637-5213-7.
