= SS Athenia (1903) =

British passenger liner sunk in WWI

Coordinates: 55.532902°N 7.238532°W

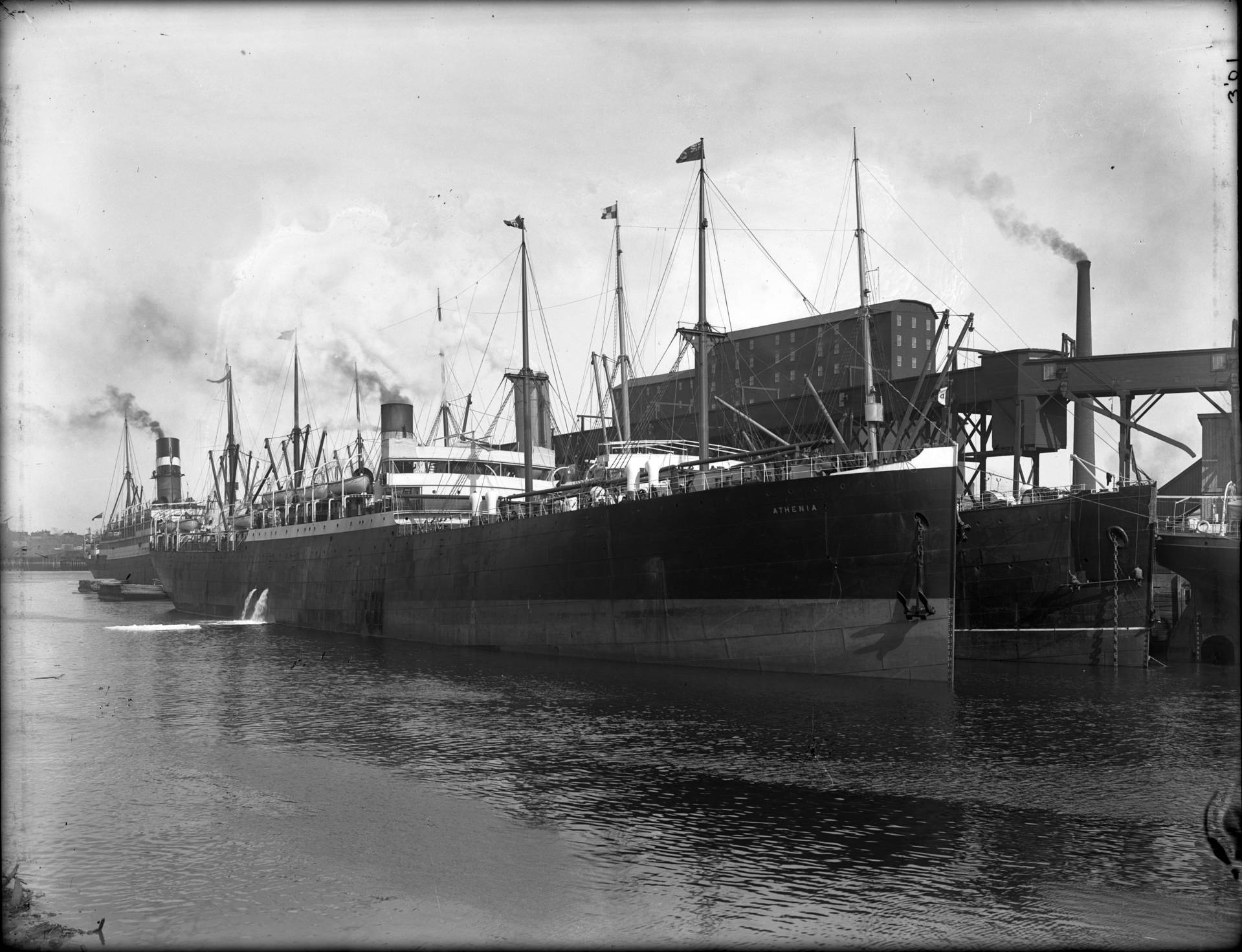
- TSS Athenia at the port of the Saint John Harbour

History

United Kingdom
- Name: Athenia
- Namesake: Athena, the patron goddess of heroic endeavour
- Owner: Donaldson Line
- Port of registry: (United Kingdom)
- Builder: Vickers. Sons & Maxim
- Launched: 20 October 1903
- Sponsored by: Donaldson Bros.
- Maiden voyage: 21 May 1904
- Out of service: 16 August 1917
- Refit: 1905
- Identification: UK official number 1119121
- Fate: Sunk, 16 August 1917

General characteristics
- Tonnage: 8,668 GRT; 8,118 NRT
- Length: 478 ft (146 m)
- Beam: 56 ft (17 m)
- Speed: 20 knots (37 km/h)

SS Athenia was the first Donaldson Line ship of that name to be torpedoed and sunk off Inishtrahull, by a German submarine (SM U-53) in 1917; the later Athenia (1922), was similarly attacked in 1939.

== Career ==
Athenia was built in 1903, for the Donaldson line Originally built for the Clyde-Canada service as 7,835 gross register tons, length 478ft x beam 56ft, one funnel, four masts, twin screw, speed 14 knots, accommodation was for 12-1st class passengers. Launched on 20 October 1903 by her shipbuilder, Vickers, Sons & Maxim for Donaldson Bros, Glasgow. She embarked on her maiden voyage from Glasgow to Montreal on 21 May 1904.

She soon proved to be too large for the service, and in 1905 she was fitted with additional passenger accommodation for 50-2nd and 450-3rd class passengers and her tonnage was increased to 8,668 gross register tons.

Her first voyage as a passenger ship was 25 March 1905 when she embarked from Glasgow for Saint John, New Brunswick, continuing sailings to Saint John and Montreal, Quebec. In 1913 she transferred to the Donaldson Line Ltd and in 1916 went to the Anchor-Donaldson Line.

=== War service ===
When Canadian troops embarked for Europe on 30 September 1914, a Burgess-Dunne seaplane was loaded aboard for England. On the trip the aircraft was heavily damaged.

She was sunk 7 miles north of Inishtrahull, Ireland with the loss of 15 crew and passengers and 440 horses on 16 August 1917. Athenia was a defensively armed merchantman, and she was torpedoed some 6 metres from her stern by SM U-53 while steaming at 20 knots, then abandoned and sunk. On her final voyage she was on passage from Montreal to Glasgow, and was in course of repatriating some members of the crew of HMHS Letitia (she had picked up at Halifax, Nova Scotia) when she was torpedoed; relatives were required to travel to Donegal to identify the bodies. Both the Letitia and the Athenia were ships of the Donaldson Line.

=== Wreck ===
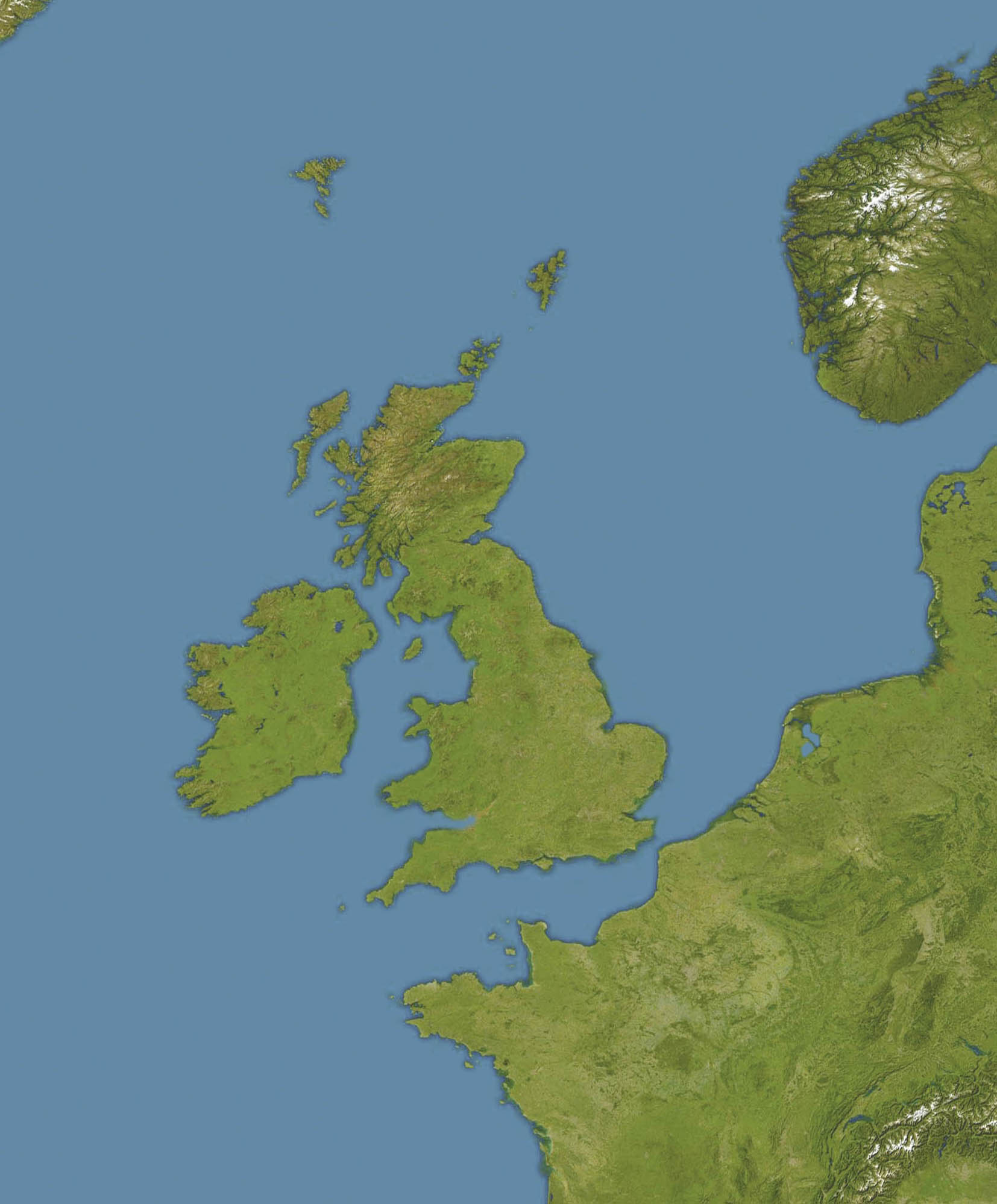
Approximate position of Athenia's wreck

The wreck lies at a depth of 55 metres. The area was depth-charged in World War II to prevent it becoming a hiding place for U-boats on the seabed. Consequently, it is well opened up, so large parts of it can be examined.

=== Legacy ===
The Donaldson line were to pay tribute to the ship by naming a second in 1922; however, after its sinking in 1939, the line would never use the Athenia name again. The line discontinued its passenger service in 1966 and finally ceased cargo operations in 1967 when it sold its last remaining cargo ships.
