= SM UB-64 =

German submarine

- UB-148 at sea, a U-boat similar to UB-64.

History

German Empire
- Name: UB-64
- Ordered: 20 May 1916
- Builder: AG Vulcan, Hamburg
- Cost: 3,279,000 German Papiermark
- Yard number: 89
- Launched: 9 June 1917
- Commissioned: 5 August 1917
- Fate: Surrendered to the British 21 November 1918 and broken up in Fareham in 1921

General characteristics
- Class & type: Type UB III submarine
- Displacement: 508 t (500 long tons) surfaced; 639 t (629 long tons) submerged
- Length: 55.52 m (182 ft 2 in) (o/a)
- Beam: 5.76 m (18 ft 11 in)
- Draught: 3.70 m (12 ft 2 in)
- Propulsion: 2 × propeller shaft; 2 × MAN four-stroke 6-cylinder diesel engines, 1,085 bhp (809 kW); 2 × Siemens-Schuckert electric motors, 780 shp (580 kW)
- Speed: 13.3 knots (24.6 km/h; 15.3 mph) surfaced; 7.8 knots (14.4 km/h; 9.0 mph) submerged
- Range: 8,420 nmi (15,590 km; 9,690 mi) at 6 knots (11 km/h; 6.9 mph) surfaced; 55 nmi (102 km; 63 mi) at 4 knots (7.4 km/h; 4.6 mph) submerged
- Test depth: 50 m (160 ft)
- Complement: 3 officers, 31 men
- Armament: 5 × 50 cm (19.7 in) torpedo tubes (4 bow, 1 stern); 10 torpedoes; 1 × 8.8 cm (3.46 in) deck gun

Service record
- Part of: V Flotilla; 10 September 1917 – 20 April 1918; II Flotilla; 20 April – 11 November 1918
- Commanders: Kptlt. Otto von Schrader; 5 August – 31 October 1917; Kptlt. Walter Gude; 1 November 1917 – 25 January 1918; Kptlt. Woldemar Petri; 26 January – 27 February 1918; Kptlt. Otto von Schrader; 28 February – 31 August 1918; Oblt.z.S. Ernst Krieger; 1 September – 11 November 1918
- Operations: 8 patrols
- Victories: 27 merchant ships sunk (21,528 GRT); 2 auxiliary warships sunk (12,221 GRT); 4 merchant ships damaged (48,497 GRT); 1 merchant ship taken as prize (371 GRT)

SM UB-64 was a German Type UB III submarine or U-boat in the German Imperial Navy (German: Kaiserliche Marine) during World War I. She was commissioned into the German Imperial Navy on 5 August 1917 as SM UB-64. (Note: "SM" stands for "Seiner Majestät" (English: His Majesty's) and combined with the U for Unterseeboot would be translated as His Majesty's Submarine.)

UB-64 was surrendered to the British on 21 November 1918 in accordance with the requirements of the Armistice with Germany and broken up in Fareham in 1921.

== Construction ==
She was built by AG Vulcan of Hamburg and following just under a year of construction, launched at Hamburg on 9 June 1917. UB-64 was commissioned later that same year under the command of Kptlt. Otto von Schrader.

Like all Type UB III submarines, UB-64 carried 10 torpedoes and was armed with a 8.8 cm (3.46 in) deck gun. UB-64 would carry a crew of up to 3 officer and 31 men and had a cruising range of 8,420 nautical miles (15,590 km; 9,690 mi). UB-64 had a displacement of 508 t (500 long tons) while surfaced and 639 t (629 long tons) when submerged. Her engines enabled her to travel at 13.3 knots (24.6 km/h; 15.3 mph) when surfaced and 8 knots (15 km/h; 9.2 mph) when submerged.

== Summary of raiding history ==
Date	Name	Nationality	Tonnage (Note: Merchant ship tonnages are in gross register tons. Military vessels are listed by tons displacement.)	Fate
13 October 1917	Newquay	United Kingdom	4,191	Damaged
13 December 1917	HMS Stephen Furness	Royal Navy	1,712	Sunk
14 February 1918	Saga	United Kingdom	1,143	Sunk
19 February 1918	Wilhelmina VII	Netherlands	109	Sunk
30 March 1918	Salaminia	Greece	3,112	Sunk
5 April 1918	Clam	United Kingdom	3,552	Damaged
11 April 1918	Lakemoor	United States	2,045	Sunk
23 May 1918	Innisfallen	United Kingdom	1,405	Sunk
30 May 1918	Cyprus	United Kingdom	35	Sunk
30 May 1918	Glad Tidings	United Kingdom	15	Sunk
30 May 1918	Honey Bee	United Kingdom	34	Sunk
30 May 1918	Jane Gordon	United Kingdom	27	Sunk
30 May 1918	Lloyd	United Kingdom	35	Sunk
30 May 1918	Marianne Mc Crum	United Kingdom	30	Sunk
30 May 1918	Never Can Tell	United Kingdom	31	Sunk
30 May 1918	Seabird	United Kingdom	15	Sunk
30 May 1918	Sparkling Wave	United Kingdom	37	Sunk
30 May 1918	St. Mary	United Kingdom	29	Sunk
8 June 1918	Elektra	Norway	614	Sunk
9 June 1918	Lena	Sweden	371	Captured as prize
19 July 1918	Justicia	United Kingdom	32,234	Damaged
19 July 1918	Ranger	United Kingdom	79	Sunk
23 July 1918	HMS Marmora	Royal Navy	10,509	Sunk
24 July 1918	Defender	United Kingdom	8,520	Damaged
13 September 1918	Buffalo	United Kingdom	286	Sunk
13 September 1918	M. J. Craig	United Kingdom	691	Sunk
13 September 1918	Setter	United Kingdom	956	Sunk
14 September 1918	Neotsfield	United Kingdom	3,821	Sunk
15 September 1918	Mary Fanny	United Kingdom	94	Sunk
15 September 1918	Energy	United Kingdom	89	Sunk
15 September 1918	Joseph Fisher	United Kingdom	88	Sunk
16 September 1918	Serula	United Kingdom	1,388	Sunk
19 September 1918	Barrister	United Kingdom	4,952	Sunk
21 September 1918	Downshire	United Kingdom	368	Sunk

== Bibliography ==
- Bendert, Harald (2000). Die UB-Boote der Kaiserlichen Marine, 1914-1918. Einsätze, Erfolge, Schicksal (in German). Hamburg: Verlag E.S. Mittler & Sohn GmbH. ISBN 3-8132-0713-7.
- Gröner, Erich; Jung, Dieter; Maass, Martin (1991). U-boats and Mine Warfare Vessels. German Warships 1815–1945. Vol. 2. Translated by Thomas, Keith; Magowan, Rachel. London: Conway Maritime Press. ISBN 0-85177-593-4.
- Rössler, Eberhard (1979). Die deutschen U-Boote und ihre Werften: eine Bilddokumentation über den deutschen U-Bootbau; in zwei Bänden (in German). Vol. I. Munich: Bernard & Graefe. ISBN 3-7637-5213-7.
