= Otto von Schrader =

German Navy Admiral (1888-1945)

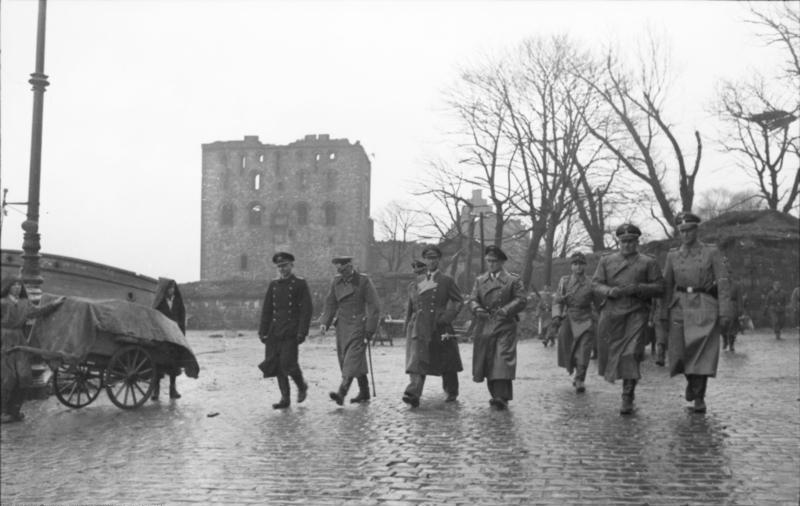
- Otto von Schrader (5th from left)
- Born: 18 March 1888; Lyck, East Prussia, German Empire (modern Poland)
- Died: 19 July 1945 (aged 57); Bergen, Norway
- Military career
- Allegiance: German Empire; Weimar Republic; Nazi Germany
- Branch: Imperial German Navy; Reichsmarine; Kriegsmarine
- Service years: 1907–45
- Rank: Admiral
- Commands: SM UB-35; SM UC-31; SM UB-64; SM U-53 light cruiser Königsberg
- Conflicts: World War I World War II
- Awards: Knight's Cross of the Iron Cross

Otto von Schrader (18 March 1888 – 19 July 1945) was a German admiral during World War II and a recipient of the Knight's Cross of the Iron Cross of Nazi Germany. As a U-boat commander during World War I, he was credited with the sinking of 57 ships totalling 54,663 gross register tons (GRT), a further 6 ships damaged, totalling 52,333 GRT, including SS Justicia, and one ship of 336 GRT taken as a prize. Schrader was taken prisoner of war in Norway at the end of World War II. He committed suicide in Norwegian captivity on 19 July 1945.

== Awards ==
- Iron Cross (1914) 1st Class (1 August 1916)
- Knight's Cross of the House Order of Hohenzollern with Swords (5 March 1922)
- Hanseatic Cross of Hamburg (5 March 1922)
- U-boat War Badge (20 November 1926)
- Gallipoli Star (Ottoman War Medal - Turkish: Harp Madalyası) (20 November 1926)
- Knight's Cross with Crown of the Bulgarian Order of Military Merit (20 November 1926)
- Clasp to the Iron Cross (1939) 1st Class (5 May 1940)
- German Cross in Gold on 20 November 1941 as Vizeadmiral and Admiral of the Norwegian West Coast
- Knight's Cross of the Iron Cross on 19 August 1943 as Admiral as commanding admiral of the Norwegian West Coast
