= SS Medina =

SS Medina may refer to:

- RMS Medina (1911), an ocean liner for Peninsular and Oriental Steam Navigation Company; sunk by German submarine UB-31 on 28 April 1917
- SS Medina (1914), an ocean liner for the Mallory Line; renamed Roma (1949), Franca C. (1952), Doulos (1978); opened as a land based hotel ship in 2019
