= SM U-53 =

Type U 51 U-boats of the Imperial German Navy during WWI

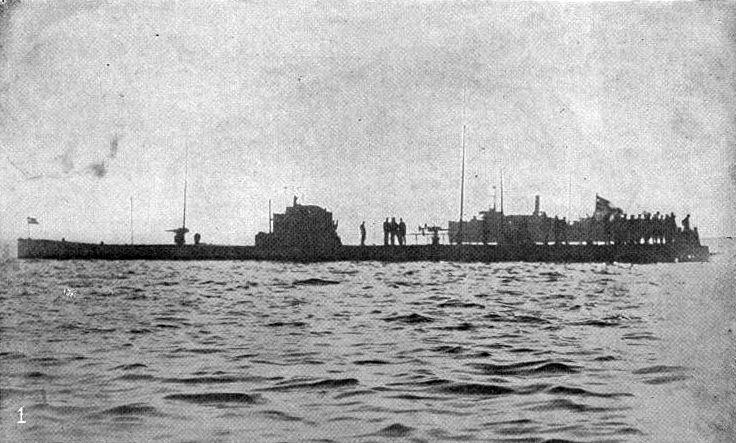
- U-53 in Newport, Rhode Island 7 October 1916

History

German Empire
- Name: U-53
- Ordered: 23 August 1914
- Builder: Germaniawerft, Kiel
- Yard number: 235
- Laid down: 17 March 1915
- Launched: 1 February 1916
- Commissioned: 22 April 1916
- Fate: 1 December 1918 - surrendered. Broken up at Swansea in 1919

General characteristics
- Class & type: Type U 51 submarine
- Displacement: 715 t (704 long tons) surfaced; 902 t (888 long tons) submerged
- Length: 65.20 m (213 ft 11 in) (o/a); 52.51 m (172 ft 3 in) (pressure hull)
- Beam: 6.44 m (21 ft 2 in) (oa); 4.18 m (13 ft 9 in) (pressure hull)
- Height: 7.82 m (25 ft 8 in)
- Draught: 3.64 m (11 ft 11 in)
- Installed power: 2 × 2,400 PS (1,765 kW; 2,367 shp) surfaced; 2 × 1,200 PS (883 kW; 1,184 shp) submerged
- Propulsion: 2 shafts
- Speed: 17.1 knots (31.7 km/h; 19.7 mph) surfaced; 9.1 knots (16.9 km/h; 10.5 mph) submerged
- Range: 9,400 nmi (17,400 km; 10,800 mi) at 8 knots (15 km/h; 9.2 mph) surfaced; 55 nmi (102 km; 63 mi) at 5 knots (9.3 km/h; 5.8 mph) submerged
- Test depth: 50 m (164 ft 1 in)
- Complement: 36
- Armament: 4 × 50 cm (19.7 in) torpedo tubes (two bow, two stern); 7 torpedoes; 2 × 8.8 cm (3.5 in) SK L/30 deck guns

Service record
- Part of: II Flotilla; 31 May 1916 – 11 November 1918
- Commanders: Kptlt. Hans Rose; 22 April 1916 – 17 August 1918; Kptlt. Otto von Schrader; 18 August – 29 November 1918
- Operations: 13 patrols
- Victories: 87 merchant ships sunk (224,314 GRT); 1 warship sunk (1,050 tons); 10 merchant ships damaged (46,339 GRT)

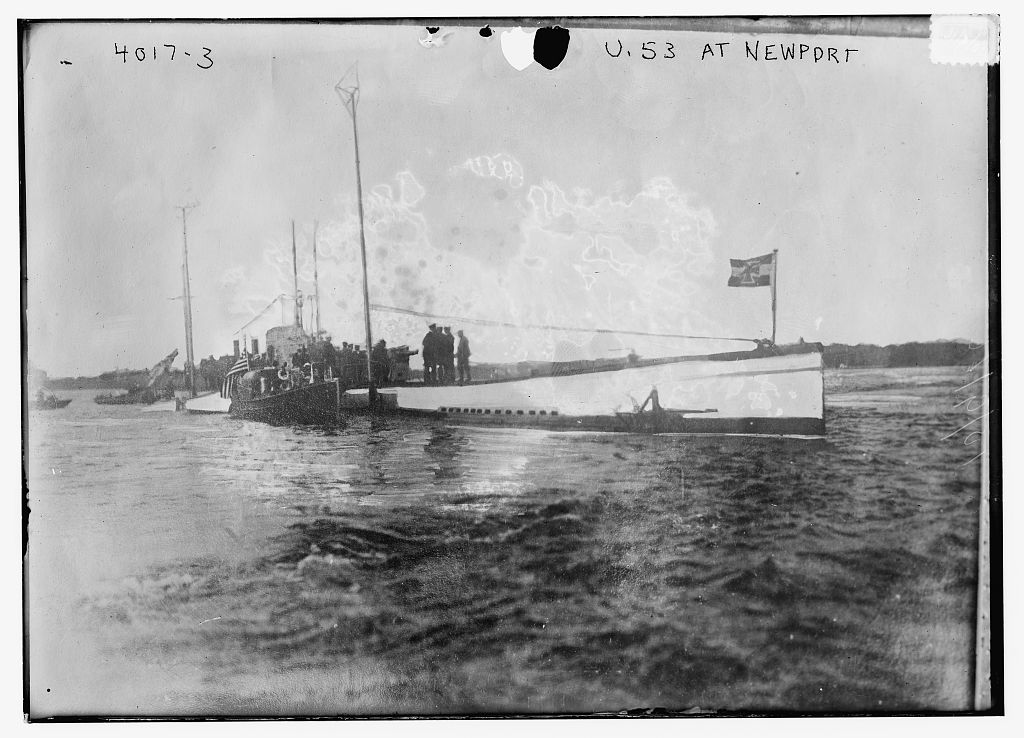
SM U-53 at Newport, Rhode Island in 1916

SM U-53 was one of the six Type U 51 U-boats of the Imperial German Navy during the First World War. While in command of U-53 her first captain Hans Rose became the 5th ranked German submarine ace of World War I sinking USS Jacob Jones and 87 merchant ships for a total of 224,314 gross register tons (GRT).

== Construction and commissioning ==
U-53 was ordered from Germaniawerft, Kiel on 23 August 1914 and launched on 1 February 1916. On 22 April 1916 Kapitänleutnant (Lieutenant Commander) Hans Rose was appointed as her first captain and he commissioned her on 22 April 1916.

After sea trials found no defects the submarine passed through the Kiel Canal on 30 May to reach the naval base at Helgoland the following day.

== Service history ==
=== Voyage to America ===
While U-53 was in Wilhelmshaven having its steering gear repaired and with most of its crew away on leave, Rose was called on 3 September 1916 to office of Fregattenkapitän Hermann Baur, commander of the U-boat fleet on the Hamburg. Bauer informed him that the merchant submarine Bremen was due to make her maiden voyage to America and it had been proposed by captain Paul König of her sistership Deutschland that another submarine be used to assist in its passage by attacking any Royal Navy vessels that were in its path. Rose had been chosen for this politically risky mission because he had the necessary qualifications and experience, as well as a good knowledge of English. Also, his submarine had only been commissioned in April 1916, so it was new and well-run in. Rose was given 30 hours to think about it and immediately telegraphed his chief engineer Henning Möller return from leave for consultation and discussing it with him. 24 hours later Rose accepted the assignment.

While U-53 had a theoretical range of 9,400 nautical miles at 8 knots, it was expected that in actual service 5,000 miles was the practical limit. The longest voyage that U-53 had completed to date had been nine days. A return voyage to America would take 50 days and cover 8,000 miles. Rose and Möller identified that by converting the two middle diving tanks II and IV into fuel tanks they could carry an additional 150 tons of diesel fuel to give a range of 11,000 miles. Additional fresh water was carried by filling two of the four trim tanks and the two rear torpedo tubes with fresh water which bought the total amount being carried to 7,000 litres. However with this amount of fuel on board and the necessary provisions the submarine’s buoyancy would be reduced in half and it would sit 400 mm lower in the water, which would badly impact on its sea-worthiness on the outward journey. Rather than the normal complement of six torpedoes forward and four aft they decided to carry only the forward torpedoes. They also added two additional engineers which increased the crew from 34 to 36. Other than Möller only the two First Lieutenants Stein and Wacker was told about the secret voyage prior to the rest of the crew being told once the submarine as at sea. To misdirect any enemy agents, it was put about that the submarine was heading south.

After being delayed for two days by poor weather the submarine departed the naval base at Helgoland on 17 September 1916, travelling northward around the British Isles, escorted by the Zeppelin LZ-17 for the first day. Once they reached the Atlantic Ocean on 21 September, Rose told the crew their actual destination. Most of the outward voyage was plagued by bad weather with sea conditions deteriorating at one point to Force 9 on the Beaufort Scale. On 24 September the submarine passed beyond radio contact with Germany. On 28 September the submarine heard a report from a radio station at Sayville on Long Island that the Bremen had been sunk. After deliberating for two days as to whether the report was true or the Bremen was merely late, Rose decided to continue with his original orders to Newport, Rhode Island rather than divert to attack shipping at Halifax. On 7 October 1916, U-53, was sighted off Newport by American submarine D-2, which surfaced and tracked the German vessel as it headed to port. As the two submarines passed Brenton Reef Lightship, Rose requested and was given permission to enter port.

Once he had docked, Rose paid courtesy visits to Rear Admiral Austin M. Knight, Commandant of the United States Second Naval District, and Rear Admiral Albert Gleaves aboard the cruiser USS Birmingham; and then received courtesy visits from both admirals aboard U-53. Admiral Gleaves brought his wife and daughter to visit U-53. It took the neutral US government about two hours to decide how to handle this surprise visit. When the harbor master started talking about quarantine regulations, Rose returned to sea to avoid being interned.

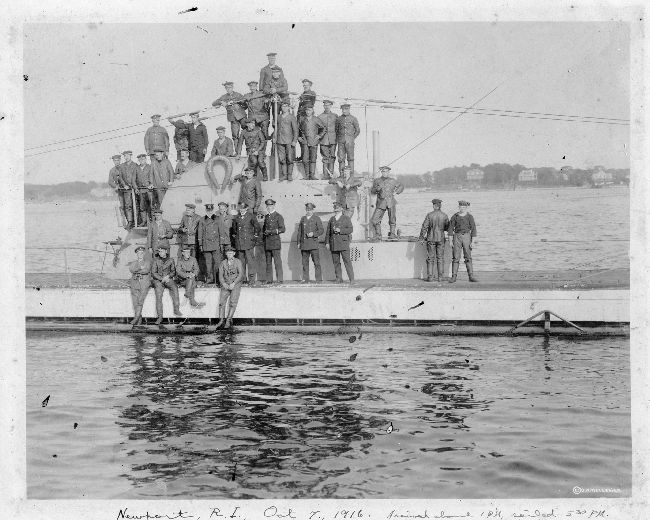
U-53's crew, 7 October 1916

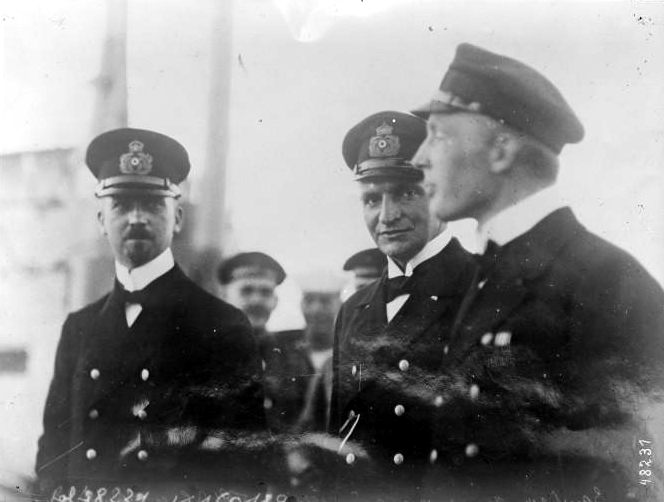
Officers of U-53 in the US

U-53 commenced military operations the next morning two miles off the Lightship Nantucket. The US steamship Kansan was stopped by a shot across the bow at 05:35, and then released when examination of her papers revealed no contraband cargo. A large passenger liner was allowed to pass at 06:00 because Rose felt unable to provide for the safety of a large number of passengers. The 4,321 GRT British steamship Strathdene was stopped at 06:53 and torpedoed at 07:43 after the crew had abandoned ship. The 4,224 GRT Norwegian steamship Christian Knutsen with a cargo of diesel oil for London was stopped at 08:03 and torpedoed at 09:53 after the crew had abandoned ship. The 3,847 GRT steamship West Point was stopped at 11:30 and scuttled by explosive charges after the crew had abandoned ship. Seventeen US destroyers were dispatched from Newport to search for survivors in response to the Nantucket lightship's reports of sinkings. The destroyers arrived about 1700 as U-53 stopped the Dutch steamship Blommersdijk bound for the Netherlands with cargo that Rose believed to be contraband bound for Britain, which he sank at 19:50. The 3,449 GRT British passenger liner Stephano carrying a cargo of codfish, worth $140,000 was stopped, and the gathering US destroyers took off its crew and passengers before Rose used his last torpedoes to sink it at 22:30. After sinking five ships in 17 days with no loss of life Rose set a homeward course via the Gulf Stream and evaded three British destroyers sent from Canada to intercept him.

On 27 October, U-53 entered Helgoland harbour to a hero’s welcome. The next day the submarine departed for Wilhelmshaven, where upon arrival the crew were greeted by Admiral Scheer and his staff. Each member of the crew was personally awarded by the Admiral with Iron Cross while Rose was later awarded the House of Hohenzollern’s Order of the Knight’s Cross with Swords. That night for the first time in six weeks that the crew slept ashore.

==== Political consequences of the voyage ====
There was a great deal of anger amongst the Allied powers after the visit of U-53 to a US port and the subsequent sinking of Allied shipping. While all of the sinkings were done according to Prize court laws and nobody was killed during them, the attacks instilled fear in the British because of the reach of the German U-boats, and the US because these attacks occurred so close to its shores.

Britain was further outraged that most of the attacks occurred while the submarine was surrounded by US destroyers. After a soothing speech by Sir Edward Grey, these complaints were calmed when he pointed out that the US ships had no legal right to interfere with these attacks and had done all they could to rescue the sailors in the water. German newspapers celebrated the trip as a great demonstration of the reach of the German Navy and Captain Rose was praised for his actions.

=== Accompanied by artist Claus Bergen ===
In the summer of 1917 German naval artist Claus Bergen accompanied U-53 on an Atlantic patrol, resulting in a series of well-known paintings.

=== Sinking of SS Housatonic ===
On 3 February 1917 U-53 captured and scuttled SS Housatonic about 20 nautical miles (37 km) southwest of Bishop Rock, Isles of Scilly. At the time the USA was still neutral and reacted cautiously to Housatonic's sinking. The New York Times noted the courtesy and propriety with which Rose had applied the rules of war. The US Government did not regard Housatonic's sinking as a casus belli. Her sinking however contributed to increasing diplomatic tension that eventually led the US to declare war on Germany.

On March 11, 1917 U-53 torpedoed and sank the 6705 ton Cunard Liner RMS Folia.

On 16 August 1917 torpedoed and sank the Donaldson liner Athenia off Inishtrahull. Coincidentally, two decades later, in 1939, a new Athenia was sunk by the U-boat U-30 in the same area.

=== Sinking of USS Jacob Jones ===
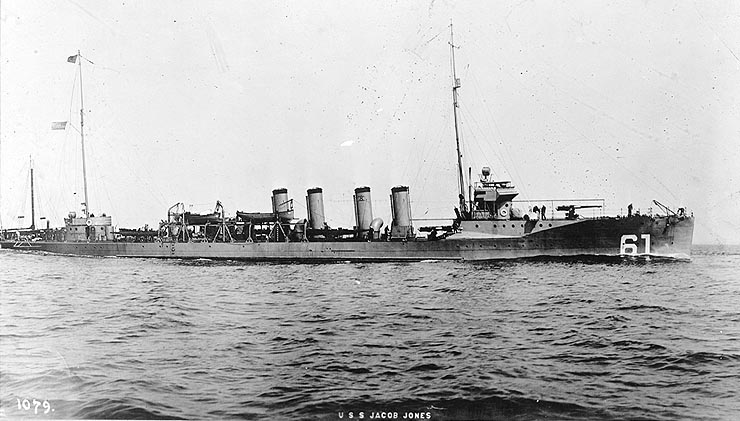
USS Jacob Jones (DD-61)

On December 6, 1917, Rose torpedoed and sank USS Jacob Jones, the first American destroyer lost in the First World War. The torpedo hit Jacob Jones at 3,000 yards (2,700 m), the longest successful torpedo shot on record at the time.

On 8 July 1918 while off the Norwegian coast and two days out from its base at Helgoland U-53 answered a distress call from U-86 which had hit a mine and as a result had lost all of its diesel fuel. Meeting with the damaged submarine U-53 transferred fuel to it and provided further assistance until it was relieved by surface vessels.

On 10 July 1918 U-53 returned to port having completed its fifteenth mission under Rose.

=== Rose replaced by von Schrader ===
Rose returned from a months leave on 10 August to be informed that he had been replaced as commander of U-53 by Otto von Schrader.

Under von Schrader U-53 operated primarily within the English Channel after this, attacking Allied and neutral vessels, sinking ten ships of 1,782 tons with U-53 before the armistice on 11 November.

The naval historian Mark Chirnside carried out research which concluded that U-53 fired a torpedo at the liner RMS Olympic on 4 September 1918, in the English Channel. The torpedo struck the ship but failed to explode. The damage caused by the impact was not discovered until the following year.

U-53 was surrendered to the Allies at Harwich on 1 December 1918 in accordance with the requirements of the Armistice with Germany. She was sold by the British Admiralty to George Cohen on 3 March 1919 for £2,400 (excluding her engines), and was broken up at Swansea.

== Summary of raiding history ==
Date	Name	Nationality	Tonnage (Note: Merchant ship tonnages are in gross register tons. Military vessels are listed by tons displacement.)	Fate
11 July 1916	Calypso	United Kingdom	2,876	Sunk
8 October 1916	Blommersdijk	Netherlands	4,835	Sunk
8 October 1916	Christian Knutsen	Norway	4,224	Sunk
8 October 1916	Stephano	United Kingdom	3,449	Sunk
8 October 1916	Strathdene	United Kingdom	4,321	Sunk
8 October 1916	West Point	United Kingdom	3,847	Sunk
22 January 1917	Anna	France	154	Sunk
22 January 1917	Zeta	Netherlands	3,053	Sunk
28 January 1917	Nueva Montana	Spain	2,039	Sunk
29 January 1917	Algorta	Spain	2,117	Sunk
31 January 1917	Hekla	Norway	524	Sunk
2 February 1917	Odin	Norway	1,045	Sunk
3 February 1917	Housatonic	United States	3,143	Sunk
4 February 1917	Aimee Maria	France	327	Sunk
4 February 1917	Bangpuhtis	Russia	259	Sunk
5 February 1917	Bråvalla	Sweden	1,519	Sunk
9 February 1917	Marian	Netherlands	71	Sunk
2 March 1917	Gazelle	United Kingdom	119	Sunk
2 March 1917	Utopia	United Kingdom	184	Sunk
3 March 1917	Theodoros Pangalos	Greece	2,838	Sunk
5 March 1917	Federico Confalonieri	Italy	4,434	Sunk
9 March 1917	Cavour	Italy	1,929	Sunk
9 March 1917	Lars Fostenes	Norway	2,118	Sunk
10 March 1917	St. Feodor	Russia	126	Damaged
11 March 1917	Folia	United Kingdom	6,705	Sunk
11 March 1917	Gracia	Spain	3,129	Sunk
12 March 1917	Hainaut	Belgium	4,113	Sunk
14 March 1917	Aquila	Norway	1,092	Sunk
18 April 1917	Scalpa	United Kingdom	1,010	Sunk
18 April 1917	Sculptor	United Kingdom	3,846	Sunk
19 April 1917	Tempus	United Kingdom	2,981	Sunk
21 April 1917	Pontiac	United Kingdom	1,698	Sunk
22 April 1917	Neepawah	Canada	1,799	Sunk
23 April 1917	Eptapyrgion	United Kingdom	4,307	Sunk
24 April 1917	Anglesea	United Kingdom	4,534	Sunk
24 April 1917	Ferndene	United Kingdom	3,770	Sunk
25 April 1917	Elisabeth	Denmark	217	Damaged
25 April 1917	Laura	United Kingdom	335	Sunk
26 April 1917	Hekla	Denmark	169	Sunk
27 June 1917	Ultonia	United Kingdom	10,402	Sunk
8 July 1917	Asheim	Norway	2,147	Sunk
8 July 1917	Atlantic	Denmark	1,087	Sunk
10 July 1917	Cedric	United Kingdom	197	Sunk
10 July 1917	Mabel	United Kingdom	205	Sunk
10 July 1917	Pacific	United Kingdom	235	Sunk
10 July 1917	Peridot	United Kingdom	214	Sunk
10 July 1917	Pretoria	United Kingdom	283	Sunk
10 July 1917	Romantic	United Kingdom	197	Sunk
10 July 1917	Sea King	United Kingdom	185	Sunk
10 July 1917	Stoic	United Kingdom	200	Sunk
16 August 1917	Athenia	United Kingdom	8,668	Sunk
21 August 1917	Devonian	United Kingdom	10,435	Sunk
21 August 1917	Roscommon	United Kingdom	8,238	Sunk
22 August 1917	Verdi	United Kingdom	7,120	Sunk
23 August 1917	Boniface	United Kingdom	3,799	Sunk
26 August 1917	Durango	United Kingdom	3,008	Sunk
26 August 1917	Kenmore	United Kingdom	3,919	Sunk
10 October 1917	Bostonian	United Kingdom	5,736	Sunk
10 October 1917	Gowrie	United Kingdom	1,031	Sunk
11 October 1917	Lewis Luckenbach	United States	3,906	Sunk
15 October 1917	San Nazario	United Kingdom	10,064	Damaged
17 October 1917	Manchuria	United Kingdom	2,997	Sunk
17 October 1917	Polvena	United Kingdom	4,750	Sunk
19 October 1917	Parkhaven	Netherlands	2,635	Sunk
20 November 1917	Megrez	Netherlands	2,695	Sunk
20 November 1917	Nederland	Netherlands	1,832	Sunk
23 November 1917	Westlands	United Kingdom	3,112	Sunk
24 November 1917	Dunrobin	United Kingdom	3,617	Sunk
1 December 1917	Helenus	United Kingdom	7,555	Damaged
5 December 1917	Earlswood	United Kingdom	2,353	Damaged
6 December 1917	USS Jacob Jones	United States Navy	1,050	Sunk
9 December 1917	Nyanza	United Kingdom	6,695	Damaged
9 December 1917	War Tune	United Kingdom	2,045	Sunk
10 December 1917	Øiekast	Norway	605	Sunk
4 February 1918	Treveal	United Kingdom	4,160	Sunk
6 February 1918	Holkar	United Kingdom	61	Sunk
6 February 1918	Marsouin	France	55	Sunk
7 February 1918	Beaumaris	United Kingdom	2,372	Sunk
8 February 1918	Basuta	United Kingdom	2,876	Sunk
9 February 1918	Lydie	United Kingdom	2,559	Sunk
11 February 1918	Merton Hall	United Kingdom	4,327	Sunk
2 April 1918	Meaford	United Kingdom	1,889	Sunk
7 April 1918	Cadillac	United Kingdom	11,106	Damaged
7 April 1918	Knight Templar	United Kingdom	7,175	Damaged
7 April 1918	Port Campbell	United Kingdom	6,230	Sunk
20 June 1918	Aisne	United Kingdom	315	Damaged
27 June 1918	Keelung	United Kingdom	6,672	Sunk
28 June 1918	Queen	United Kingdom	4,956	Sunk
30 June 1918	W.M.L.	United Kingdom	145	Sunk
2 July 1918	Erme	United Kingdom	116	Sunk
6 July 1918	Gullfaxi	Iceland	46	Sunk
28 August 1918	Pauline	Russia	134	Sunk
1 September 1918	Ami De Dieu	France	45	Sunk
1 September 1918	Etoile Polaire	France	51	Sunk
2 September 1918	Hirondelle	France	38	Sunk
2 September 1918	Nicolazic	France	42	Sunk
4 September 1918	War Firth	United Kingdom	3,112	Sunk
4 September 1918	RMS Olympic	United Kingdom	46,000	Torpedo Failed to Detonate
5 September 1918	Rio Mondego	Portugal	733	Damaged

== Bibliography ==
- Beesly, Patrick (1982). Room 40: British Naval Intelligence 1914-1918. London: H Hamilton. ISBN 978-0-241-10864-2.
- Gröner, Erich; Jung, Dieter; Maass, Martin (1991). U-boats and Mine Warfare Vessels. German Warships 1815–1945. Vol. 2. Translated by Thomas, Keith; Magowan, Rachel. London: Conway Maritime Press. ISBN 0-85177-593-4.
- Halpern, Paul G. (1995). A Naval History of World War I. New York: Routledge. ISBN 978-1-85728-498-0.
- Koerver, Hans Joachim (2008). Room 40: German Naval Warfare 1914-1918. Vol I., The Fleet in Action. Steinbach: LIS Reinisch. ISBN 978-3-902433-76-3.
- Koerver, Hans Joachim (2009). Room 40: German Naval Warfare 1914-1918. Vol II., The Fleet in Being. Steinbach: LIS Reinisch. ISBN 978-3-902433-77-0.
- Long, Wellington (October 1966). "The Cruise of the U-53". United States Naval Institute Proceedings. 92/10/764. United States Naval Institute.
- Massie, Robert (2003). Castles of Steel. Ballantine Books. ISBN 0-345-40878-0.
- Robinson, Markus F.; Robinson, Gertrude J. (2018). Der Kapitän: U-Boat Ace Hans Rose (Hardcover). Stroud, Gloucestershire, UK: Amberley. ISBN 978-1-4456-7560-2.
- Roessler, Eberhard (1997). Die Unterseeboote der Kaiserlichen Marine. Bonn: Bernard & Graefe. ISBN 978-3-7637-5963-7.
- Schroeder, Joachim (2002). Die U-Boote des Kaisers. Bonn: Bernard & Graefe. ISBN 978-3-7637-6235-4.
- Spindler, Arno (1932). Der Handelskrieg mit U-Booten. 5 Vols (1933, 1934, 1941/1964, 1966 ed.). Berlin: Mittler & Sohn. Vols. 4+5, dealing with 1917+18, are very hard to find: Guildhall Library, London, has them all, also Vol. 1-3 in an English translation: The submarine war against commerce.
- Tarrant, V.E. (1989). The U-Boat Offensive 1914-1945. Cassell & Company. ISBN 1-85409-520-X.
