= SS Bogstad =

Norwegian cargo ship (1910–1918)

History

Norway
- Name: Bogstad
- Owner: Fearnley & Eger
- Port of registry: (Norway) , Oslo
- Builder: Graham & Co.
- Yard number: 153
- Laid down: 1910
- Launched: 1910
- Completed: October 1910
- Acquired: October 1910
- Maiden voyage: October 1910
- In service: October 1910
- Out of service: 4 September 1918
- Fate: Torpedoed and sunk on 4 September 1918
- Notes: Call letters: MGCS

General characteristics
- Type: Cargo ship
- Tonnage: 1,589 GRT
- Length: 47.3 m (155 ft 2 in)
- Beam: 11.6 m (38 ft 1 in)
- Depth: 5.6 m (18 ft 4 in)
- Installed power: Triple expansion engine
- Propulsion: One screw propeller
- Speed: 9.5 knots (17.6 km/h; 10.9 mph)
- Crew: 12

SS Bogstad was a Norwegian cargo ship of 1,589 gross register tons (GRT) in operation between 1910 and 1918. She was torpedoed and sunk by SM UB-125 18 nautical miles (33 km) south of Lundy Island in the Bristol Channel on 4 September 1918 with the loss of all 12 of her crew, while she was travelling from Bilbao, Spain to Newport, United Kingdom with a cargo of iron ore.

== Construction ==
Bogstad was constructed for Fearnley & Eger at the Graham & Co. shipyard in Sunderland, United Kingdom in 1910, and completed by October that same year. The ship was 47.3 metres (155 ft 2 in) long, had a beam of 11.6 metres (38 ft 1 in) and a depth of 5.6 metres (18 ft 4 in). She was assessed at 1,589 gross register tons (GRT) and had a triple expansion engine producing 150 nhp, driving a single screw propeller. The ship could reach a maximum speed of 9.5 knots (17.6 km/h; 10.9 mph) and could accommodate a crew of 12.

== Sinking ==
Bogstad departed Bilbao for Newport on 3 September 1918 with a cargo of iron ore. The following morning, she was torpedoed without warning by SM UB-125 18 nautical miles (33 km) south of Lundy Island in the Bristol Channel and sank immediately. All twelve crewmembers were lost in the sinking, and the ship was subsequently listed as missing after having passed Brest, France on 3 September before her true fate became known.

== Wreck ==
The wreck of Bogstad lies at 50°53′N 4°41′W in 50 metres (160 ft) of water. The current condition of the wreck is unknown.
