= List of shipwrecks in June 1918 =

The list of shipwrecks in June 1918 includes ships sunk, foundered, grounded, or otherwise lost during June 1918.

== 1 June ==
List of shipwrecks: 1 June 1918
Ship	State	Description
Angelina	Italy	World War I: The cargo ship was sunk in the Mediterranean Sea west of Cape Granitola (approximately 37°N 12°E) by SM UB-68 (Imperial German Navy).
Egret	United Kingdom	World War I: The trawler was torpedoed and sunk in the North Sea 2 nautical miles (3.7 km) east by north of the Humber Lightship (United Kingdom) by an Imperial German Navy submarine with the loss of eleven of her crew.

== 2 June ==
List of shipwrecks: 2 June 1918
Ship	State	Description
Argus	Denmark	World War I: The sailing vessel was sunk in the Atlantic Ocean 80 nautical miles (150 km) west by north of Loop Head, County Clare (52°27′N 11°29′W) by SM U-97 (Imperial German Navy). Her crew survived.
Carolina	United States	World War I: The passenger ship was shelled and sunk in the Atlantic Ocean 65 nautical miles (120 km) east of Atlantic City, New Jersey by SM U-151 (Imperial German Navy) with the loss of thirteen lives. Survivors were rescued by Appleby (United Kingdom), Bryssel (Denmark) and Eva B. Douglas (United States) or reached the shore in their lifeboat.
Edward H. Cole	United States	World War I: The sailing vessel was shelled and sunk in the Atlantic Ocean 50 nautical miles (93 km) east by south of the Barnegat Lighthouse, New Jersey by SM U-151 (Imperial German Navy). Her crew survived.
Isabel B. Wiley	United States	World War I: The three-masted schooner was scuttled in the Atlantic Ocean off the Barnegat Lighthouse by SM U-151 (Imperial German Navy). Her crew survived.
Jacob M. Haskell	United States	World War I: The sailing vessel was sunk in the Atlantic Ocean 50 nautical miles (93 km) east by south of the Barnegat Lighthouse by SM U-151 (Imperial German Navy). Her crew survived.
Texel	United States	World War I: The cargo ship was sunk in the Atlantic Ocean 60 nautical miles (110 km) south of New York (38°57′N 73°13′W) by SM U-151 (Imperial German Navy). Her crew survived.
Winneconne	United States	World War I: The cargo ship was sunk in the Atlantic Ocean (39°26′N 72°50′W) by SM U-151 (Imperial German Navy). Her crew survived.

== 3 June ==
List of shipwrecks: 3 June 1918
Ship	State	Description
Glaucus	United Kingdom	World War I: The cargo ship was torpedoed and sunk in the Mediterranean Sea 20 nautical miles (37 km) west of Cape Granitola, Italy (37°33′N 12°15′E) by SM UB-68 (Imperial German Navy) with the loss of two of her crew.
Herbert L. Pratt	United States	World War I: The tanker was sunk by a mine off Cape Henlopen, Delaware. Salvaged, repaired and returned to service.
Mecanicien Donzel	France	World War I: The cargo ship, on her maiden voyage, was torpedoed and sunk in the Mediterranean Sea 68 nautical miles (126 km) north west of Cape Argentira (40°45′N 6°59′E) by SM UB-49 (Imperial German Navy). Her crew were rescued by Marguerite-Marie (French Navy).
Nora	United Kingdom	World War I: The cargo ship was torpedoed and sunk in the Mediterranean Sea 205 nautical miles (380 km) south east of Malta (33°38′N 17°42′E) by SM UB-105 (Imperial German Navy) with the loss of a crew member.
Samuel C. Mengel	United States	World War I: The four-masted schooner was scuttled in the Atlantic Ocean (38°07′N 73°46′W) by SM U-151 (Imperial German Navy). Her crew survived.
Sant' Antonio	Italy	World War I: The brig was scuttled in the Mediterranean Sea 82 nautical miles (152 km) south of Santa Maria di Leuca, Lecce (37°55′N 19°00′E) by SM UB-48 (Imperial German Navy).
HMT St. John's	Royal Navy	World War I: The naval trawler was shelled and sunk in the Atlantic Ocean 45 nautical miles (83 km) north of Tory Island, County Donegal (55°55′N 8°15′W) by SM U-101 (Imperial German Navy) with the loss of four of her crew. Three survivors were taken as prisoners of war.

== 4 June ==
List of shipwrecks: 4 June 1918
Ship	State	Description
Edward R. Baird	United States	World War I: The schooner was captured by SM U-151 (Imperial German Navy) in the western Atlantic Ocean and sunk with explosives. Later refloated, repaired and returned to service.
Eidsvold	Norway	World War I: The cargo ship was sunk in the Atlantic Ocean (37°12′N 73°55′W) by SM U-151 (Imperial German Navy). Her crew survived.
SMS T68	Imperial German Navy	World War I: The S66-class torpedo boat struck a mine and sank in the North Sea with the loss of seven of her crew.

== 5 June ==
List of shipwrecks: 5 June 1918
Ship	State	Description
Anton	Sweden	World War I: The wooden barque was sunk in the North Sea 24 nautical miles (44 km) west south west of the Lindesnes Lighthouse, Norway by SM U-80 (Imperial German Navy). Her crew survived.
Argonaut	United States	World War I: The cargo ship was sunk in the Western Approaches (49°12′N 6°45′W) by SM U-82 (Imperial German Navy). Her crew survived.
Harpathian	United Kingdom	World War I: The cargo ship was torpedoed and sunk in the Atlantic Ocean 80 nautical miles (150 km) off Cape Henry, Virginia by SM U-151 (Imperial German Navy). Her crew survived.
Polwell	United Kingdom	World War I: The cargo ship was torpedoed and sunk in the Irish Sea 3 nautical miles (5.6 km) north east of Lambay Island, County Dublin (53°33′N 5°55′W) by SM U-96 (Imperial German Navy). Her crew survived.
USS SC-132	United States Navy	The SC-1-class submarine chaser sank in a collision with USS Tacoma (United States Navy) off Barnegat Lighthouse, New Jersey.
HMS Snaefell	Royal Navy	World War I: The armed boarding steamer was torpedoed and sunk in the Mediterranean Sea 240 nautical miles (440 km) east-southeast of Malta by the submarine SM UB-105 (Imperial German Navy). Her crew survived.
Vinland	Norway	World War I: The cargo ship was sunk in the Atlantic Ocean 50 nautical miles (93 km) off Cape Henry (36°32′N 73°58′W) by SM U-151 (Imperial German Navy). Her crew survived.

== 6 June ==
List of shipwrecks: 6 June 1918
Ship	State	Description
Active	United Kingdom	World War I: The fishing ketch was shelled and sunk in the North Sea off the coast of Norfolk by SM UB-40 (Imperial German Navy). Her crew survived.
Archbank	United Kingdom	World War I: The cargo ship was torpedoed and sunk in the Mediterranean Sea 240 nautical miles (440 km) east south east of Malta by SM UB-105 (Imperial German Navy) with the loss of a crew member.
Beryl	United Kingdom	World War I: The fishing smack was scuttled in the North Sea off the coast of Norfolk by SM UB-40 (Imperial German Navy). Her crew survived.
Christophero Colombo	Italy	World War I: The schooner was scuttled in the Strait of Messina (37°09′N 11°25′E) by SM UB-48 (Imperial German Navy).
Dianthus	United Kingdom	World War I: The fishing smack was scuttled in the North Sea off the coast of Norfolk by SM UB-40 (Imperial German Navy). Her crew survived.
Huntsland	United Kingdom	World War I: The cargo ship was torpedoed and sunk in the English Channel 23 nautical miles (43 km) north by west of Le Havre, Seine-Inférieure, France (49°50′N 0°10′W) by SM UC-77 (Imperial German Navy). Her crew survived.
Menzaleh	United Kingdom	World War I: The cargo ship was torpedoed and sunk in the Mediterranean Sea 240 nautical miles (440 km) east south east of Malta by SM UB-105 (Imperial German Navy). Her crew survived, but her captain was taken as a prisoner of war.
Koningin Regentes	Netherlands	: World War I: The paddle steamer, a hospital ship and former passenger ship, was torpedoed and sunk in the North Sea 21 nautical miles (39 km) east of the Leman Lightship (United Kingdom) by the submarine SM UB-107 (Imperial German Navy).

== 7 June ==
List of shipwrecks: 7 June 1918
Ship	State	Description
Axpe Mendi	Spain	World War I: The cargo ship was torpedoed and sunk in the Bay of Biscay 60 nautical miles (110 km) off Brest, Finistère, France by SM UB-80 (Imperial German Navy). Her crew survived.
Brisk	Norway	World War I: The cargo ship was sunk in the Atlantic Ocean 13 nautical miles (24 km) north west of Trevose Head, Cornwall, United Kingdom (50°46′N 5°49′W) by SM U-82 (Imperial German Navy). Her crew survived.
Diana	United Kingdom	World War I: The cargo ship was torpedoed and sunk in the North Sea 10 nautical miles (19 km) south south east of Flamborough Head, Yorkshire by SM UB-108 (Imperial German Navy). Her crew survived.

== 8 June ==
List of shipwrecks: 8 June 1918
Ship	State	Description
Concettina	Italy	World War I: The cargo ship was sunk in the Mediterranean Sea east of Sicily by SM UC-53 (Imperial German Navy). Her crew survived.
Elektra	Norway	World War I: The sailing vessel was sunk in the North Sea 16 nautical miles (30 km) south east of the Ryvingen Lightship (Norway) by SM UB-64 (Imperial German Navy). Her crew survived.
Eros	United Kingdom	World War I: The trawler struck a mine and sank in the North Sea 36 nautical miles (67 km) east north east of Spurn Point, Yorkshire with the loss of six of her crew.
Hogarth	United Kingdom	World War I: The cargo ship was torpedoed and sunk in the North Sea off Sunderland, County Durham (54°51′N 1°03′W) by SM UB-107 (Imperial German Navy) with the loss of 26 of her crew.
Hunsgrove	United Kingdom	World War I: The cargo ship was torpedoed and sunk in the Atlantic Ocean 6.5 nautical miles (12.0 km) north west of Trevose Head, Cornwall (50°36′N 5°11′W) by SM U-82 (Imperial German Navy) with the loss of three of her crew.
La Bayonnaise	France	World War I: The cargo ship was sunk in the Mediterranean Sea 21 nautical miles (39 km) south east of Cape Spartivento, Italy (37°55′N 16°34′E) by SM UC-53 (Imperial German Navy).
Pinar del Rio	United States	World War I: The cargo ship was sunk in the Atlantic Ocean 110 miles (180 km) south east of Cape Henry (36°15′N 73°55′W) by SM U-151 (Imperial German Navy). Her crew survived.
Saima	United Kingdom	World War I: The cargo ship was torpedoed and sunk in the Atlantic Ocean 10 nautical miles (19 km) west of Trevose Head (50°29′N 5°23′W) by SM U-82 (Imperial German Navy) with the loss of sixteen of her crew.

== 9 June ==
List of shipwrecks: 9 June 1918
Ship	State	Description
Clan Forbes	United Kingdom	World War I: The collier was torpedoed and sunk in the Mediterranean Sea 115 nautical miles (213 km) west north west of Alexandria, Egypt (31°55′N 27°50′E) by SM UB-105 (Imperial German Navy) with the loss of two of her crew.
Helene	Netherlands	World War I: The fishing vessel was shelled and sunk in the North Sea (55°38′N 2°55′E) by SM U-100 (Imperial German Navy) with the loss of three of her crew.
Moidart	United Kingdom	World War I: The cargo ship was torpedoed and sunk in the English Channel 7 nautical miles (13 km) south east of Lyme Regis, Dorset by SM UC-77 (Imperial German Navy) with the loss of fifteen of her crew.
Pundit	United Kingdom	World War I: The cargo ship was torpedoed and sunk in the Mediterranean Sea 85 nautical miles (157 km) west north west of Alexandria by SM UB-105 (Imperial German Navy) with the loss of six of her crew.
Queen Victoria	United Kingdom	World War I: The sailing vessel was scuttled in the Bristol Channel 6 nautical miles (11 km) south east of Lundy Island, Devon by a Kaiserliche Marine submarine.
Tewfikieh	United Kingdom	World War I: The cargo ship was torpedoed and sunk in the Mediterranean Sea 115 nautical miles (213 km) west north west of Alexandria by SM UB-105 (Imperial German Navy) with the loss of five of her crew.
Vandalia	United Kingdom	World War I: The cargo ship was torpedoed and sunk in the Irish Sea 18 nautical miles (33 km) west north west of the Smalls Lighthouse (51°44′N 6°10′W) by SM U-96 (Imperial German Navy). Her crew survived.

== 10 June ==
List of shipwrecks: 10 June 1918
Ship	State	Description
Boma	United Kingdom	World War I: The cargo ship was torpedoed and sunk in the English Channel 10 nautical miles (19 km) south west by west of Beer Head, Devon (50°32′N 3°14′W) by SM UB-80 (Imperial German Navy). Her crew survived.
Borg	United Kingdom	World War I: The cargo ship was torpedoed and sunk in the Atlantic Ocean 20 nautical miles (37 km) south west by south of The Lizard, Cornwall (49°37′N 5°07′W) by SM UB-103 (Imperial German Navy) with the loss of 24 of her crew.
Brodholme	United Kingdom	World War I: The cargo ship was torpedoed and damaged in the Mediterranean Sea 3.5 nautical miles (6.5 km) north east of Syracuse, Sicily, Italy by SM UC-53 (Imperial German Navy) with the loss of four of her crew. She was beached but was later refloated.
Dora	Sweden	World War I: The cargo ship was sunk with the loss of nine crew in the North Sea 3.5 nautical miles (6.5 km) east of Whitby, Yorkshire, United Kingdom (55°18′N 1°32′W) by SM UB-88 (Imperial German Navy).
Henrik Lund	Norway	World War I: The cargo ship was scuttled in the Atlantic Ocean (36°30′N 71°29′W) by SM U-151 (Imperial German Navy). Her crew survived.
HMS Lowtyne	Royal Navy	World War I: The Q-ship was torpedoed and sunk in the North Sea 3.5 nautical miles (6.5 km) east south east of Whitby (54°29′N 0°30′W) by SM UB-34 (Imperial German Navy) with the loss of three of her crew.
HMML 64	Royal Navy	The motor launch was lost on this date.
Mountby	United Kingdom	World War I: The cargo ship was torpedoed and sunk in the English Channel 8 nautical miles (15 km) east by south of The Lizard, Cornwall (49°58′N 5°01′W) by SM UC-49 (Imperial German Navy). Her crew survived.
Nivernais	France	World War I: The cargo ship was sunk in the Mediterranean Sea south of the Balearic Islands, Spain (38°10′N 4°07′E) by SM UB-48 (Imperial German Navy).
Princess Maud	United Kingdom	World War I: The cargo ship was torpedoed and sunk in the North Sea 5 nautical miles (9.3 km) north east by north of Blyth, Northumberland by SM UB-88 (Imperial German Navy)with the loss of three of her crew.
Stryn	United Kingdom	World War I: The cargo ship was torpedoed and sunk in the English Channel 5 nautical miles (9.3 km) east of Berry Head, Devon by SM UB-80 (Imperial German Navy) with the loss of eight of her crew.
SMS Szent István	Austro-Hungarian Navy	Szent István World War I: The battleship was torpedoed and sunk in the Adriatic Sea off Pula, Croatia-Slavonia by MAS-15 (Regia Marina) with the loss of 89 of her 1,094 crew.
Vindeggen	Norway	World War I: The cargo ship was scuttled in the Atlantic Ocean (36°25′N 71°20′W) by SM U-151 (Imperial German Navy) with the loss of a crew member.

== 11 June ==
List of shipwrecks: 11 June 1918
Ship	State	Description
Lorle	United Kingdom	World War I: The cargo ship was torpedoed and sunk in the Atlantic Ocean 12 nautical miles (22 km) south west of The Lizard, Cornwall (49°47′N 5°14′W) by SM UB-103 (Imperial German Navy) with the loss of nineteen of her crew.

== 12 June ==
List of shipwrecks: 12 June 1918
Ship	State	Description
Afrique	France	World War I: The cargo ship was torpedoed and sunk in the North Sea 6 nautical miles (11 km) north west of Whitby, Yorkshire, United Kingdom by SM UC-40 (Imperial German Navy) with the loss of twelve of her crew.
Kennington	United Kingdom	World War I: The cargo ship was torpedoed and sunk in the North Sea 15 nautical miles (28 km) off Flamborough Head, Yorkshire by SM UB-108 (Imperial German Navy) with the loss of four of her crew.
Kul	United Kingdom	World War I: The cargo ship was torpedoed and sunk in the Atlantic Ocean 3.5 nautical miles (6.5 km) north east of the Wolf Rock, Cornwall (50°00′N 5°46′W) by SM UB-103 (Imperial German Navy) with the loss of four of her 21 crew.
Poincare	Tunisia	World War I: The sailing vessel was sunk in the Mediterranean Sea west of Malta by SM UC-20 (Imperial German Navy).

== 13 June ==
List of shipwrecks: 13 June 1918
Ship	State	Description
Agnes	Sweden	World War I: The cargo ship was torpedoed and sunk with the loss of two of the crew in the North Sea 12 nautical miles (22 km) east of Flamborough Head, Yorkshire, United Kingdom by SM UB-107 (Imperial German Navy).
Ascania	United Kingdom	The steamer was wrecked in the Breton Strait 20 miles (32 km) east of Cape Ray, Newfoundland.
HMS Conquest	Royal Navy	World War I: The C-class cruiser struck a mine and was damaged in the North Sea 2.5 nautical miles (4.6 km) south west of the Sunk Lightship (United Kingdom) (51°50′45″N 1°34′30″E) with the loss of seven of her crew. She was subsequent repaired and returned to service.
Kalo	United Kingdom	World War I: The cargo ship was torpedoed and sunk in the North Sea 18 nautical miles (33 km) south east of Flamborough Head by SM UB-107 (Imperial German Navy) with the loss of three of her crew.
Octo	Norway	World War I: The cargo ship struck a mine and sank in the Mediterranean Sea north east of Zemra Island, Tunisia (37°08′N 10°54′E) with the loss of twelve of her crew.
HMS Patia	Royal Navy	World War I: The armed boarding steamer was torpedoed and sunk in the Atlantic Ocean 25 nautical miles (46 km) west of Hartland Point, Devon (50°53′N 5°41′W) by SM UC-49 (Imperial German Navy) with the loss of sixteen of her crew.
Penhallow	United Kingdom	World War I: The cargo ship was torpedoed and sunk in the Mediterranean Sea 52 nautical miles (96 km) north by west of Cape Caxine, Algeria by SM UB-48 (Imperial German Navy) with the loss of a crew member.

== 14 June ==
List of shipwrecks: 14 June 1918
Ship	State	Description
Kringsjå	Norway	World War I: The four-masted barque was shelled and sunk in the Atlantic Ocean 90 nautical miles (170 km) off the coast of Virginia, United States (38°02′N 71°40′W) by SM U-151 (Imperial German Navy). Her crew survived.
HMT Princess Olga	Royal Navy	World War I: The naval trawler struck a mine and sank in the English Channel off Le Havre, Seine-Inférieure, France. Her crew survived.
Ravalli	United States	During a voyage from Seattle, Washington to ports in Southeast Alaska with 50 passengers, 30 crewmen, and 832 tons of cargo aboard, the 908- or 1,305-gross register ton, 186.2-foot (56.8 m) screw steamer caught fire in Lowe Inlet (53.5508°N 129.591°W) off Grenville Channel on the coast of British Columbia in Canada due to the spontaneous combustion of coal. The steamer Venture (flag unknown) and three launches took off her passengers and crew, all of whom survived, and she sank in the inlet in 60 feet (18.3 meters) of water, a total loss.
Samoa	Norway	World War I: The four-masted barque was shelled and sunk in the Atlantic Ocean 90 nautical miles (170 km) off the coast of Virginia (37°30′N 72°10′W) by SM U-151 (Imperial German Navy). Her crew survived.

== 15 June ==
List of shipwrecks: 15 June 1918
Ship	State	Description
Kieldrecht	United Kingdom	World War I: The cargo ship was torpedoed and sunk in the North Sea 21 nautical miles (39 km) east by south of Flamborough Head, East Riding of Yorkshire by SM UB-107 (Imperial German Navy). Her crew survived.
Makambo	Australia	The steamship ran aground near Neds Beach at the northern end of Lord Howe Island with the loss of one life. She was refloated nine days later, repaired, and returned to service.

== 16 June ==
List of shipwrecks: 16 June 1918
Ship	State	Description
Ka. Thaleen	United States	The barge sank near Sandwich, Massachusetts.
Melanie	United Kingdom	World War I: The cargo ship was torpedoed and sunk in the North Sea 5 nautical miles (9.3 km) south east of Whitby, Yorkshire by SM UC-40 (Imperial German Navy) with the loss of five of her crew.
HMT Ocean Fisher	Royal Navy	The naval trawler, operating as a Q-ship, was lost on this date.

== 17 June ==
List of shipwrecks: 17 June 1918
Ship	State	Description
Gromki	Imperial Russian Navy	World War I: The Derzky-class destroyer was scuttled in Tsemes Bay.
SM U-64	Imperial German Navy	World War I: The SM U-64 submarine was depth charged, shelled and sunk in the Mediterranean Sea (38°07′N 10°27′E) by HMS Lychnis (Royal Navy) with the loss of 38 of her 43 crew.

== 18 June ==
List of shipwrecks: 18 June 1918
Ship	State	Description
Dwinsk	United Kingdom	World War I: The ocean liner was torpedoed and sunk in the Atlantic Ocean 400 nautical miles (740 km) north east of Bermuda by SM U-151 (Imperial German Navy) with the loss of 22 lives. Survivors were rescued by USS Rondo, USS Siboney and USS Von Steuben (all United States Navy).
Fidonisy	Imperial Russian Navy	World War I: The Kerch-class destroyer was scuttled in Tsemes Bay.
Kapitan-leytenant Baranov	Imperial Russian Navy	World War I: The Leytenant Shestakov-class destroyer was scuttled in Tsemes Bay.
Kerch	Imperial Russian Navy	World War I: The Kerch-class destroyer was scuttled in Tsemes Bay.
Leytenant Shestakov	Imperial Russian Navy	World War I: The Leytenant Shestakov-class destroyer was scuttled in Tsemes Bay.
Norfolk Coast	United Kingdom	World War I: The coaster was torpedoed and sunk in the North Sea 23 nautical miles (43 km) south east of Flamborough Head, Yorkshire (53°40′N 0°28′E) by SM UB-30 (Imperial German Navy) with the loss of eight crew.
No. 11	Imperial Russian Navy	World War I: The torpedo boat was scuttled at Novorossiysk.
Pronzitelny	Imperial Russian Navy	World War I: The Derzky-class destroyer was scuttled in Tsemes Bay.
Smyetlivi	Imperial Russian Navy	World War I: The Pruitki-class destroyer was scuttled in Tsemes Bay.
Stremitelni	Imperial Russian Navy	World War I: The Pruitki-class destroyer was scuttled in Tsemes Bay.
Svobodnaya Rossiya	Imperial Russian Navy	World War I: The Imperatritsa Mariya-class battleship was scuttled at Novorossiysk by Kerch (Imperial Russian Navy).

== 20 June ==
List of shipwrecks: 20 June 1918
Ship	State	Description
SM UC-64	Imperial German Navy	World War I: The Type UC II submarine struck a mine and sank in the Strait of Dover (50°58′N 1°23′W) with the loss of all 30 crew.

== 21 June ==
List of shipwrecks: 21 June 1918
Ship	State	Description
Barnes	United States	The 41-gross register ton motor vessel's crew of four abandoned her off Tolstoi Point (55°40′10″N 132°23′10″W) in Clarence Strait in the Alexander Archipelago in Southeast Alaska after a fire on board went out of control. After they were rescued by the motor vessel Irene Barnes (United States), they returned aboard Irene Barnes in search of Barnes, but Barnes had disappeared and was presumed to have sunk.
Eglantine	Norway	World War I: The sailing vessel was sunk in the North Sea by SM U-86 (Imperial German Navy) with the loss of eight of her crew.
USS Fenimore	United States Navy	The sidewheel steamer burned while at anchor in the York River, Norfolk, Virginia, a total loss. Two people were killed and two wounded.
Montebello	United Kingdom	World War I: The cargo ship was torpedoed and sunk in the Atlantic Ocean 320 nautical miles (590 km) west of Ouessant, Finistère, France (47°05′N 12°45′W) by SM U-100 (Imperial German Navy) with the loss of 41 crew.
USS Schurz	United States Navy	The patrol gunboat, originally a German Bussard-class cruiser, was rammed and sunk in the Atlantic Ocean south west of the Cape Lookout Lightship (United States Navy) by Florida (United States) with the loss of a crew member.

== 22 June ==
List of shipwrecks: 22 June 1918
Ship	State	Description
Avance	Sweden	World War I: The cargo ship was sunk in the North Sea off Flamborough Head, Yorkshire, United Kingdom (54°13′N 0°08′W) by SM UB-88 (Imperial German Navy). One crew member died.
USS Californian	United States Navy	USS Californian World War I: The cargo ship struck a mine and sank in the Bay of Biscay. Her crew were rescued by USS Corsair(United States Navy).
Camp Boulhant	France	The four-masted schooner was driven ashore and wrecked. Her crew survived.
Chilier	Belgium	World War I: The cargo ship was captured by, and sunk by gunfire from, U-151 (Imperial German Navy) in the Atlantic Ocean off Newfoundland (39°30′N 53°40′W).
Metamorphosis	Greece	World War I: The schooner was scuttled in the Mediterranean Sea south of Syracuse, Sicily, Italy (37°14′N 16°17′W) by SM UC-52 (Imperial German Navy).
Rana	Norway	World War I: The sailing vessel was sunk in the Skagerrak 25 nautical miles (46 km) south west by south of Ryvingen, Rogaland (57°12′N 6°36′E) by SM U-111 (Imperial German Navy). Her crew survived.
Rhea	United Kingdom	World War I: The cargo ship struck a mine and sank in the English Channel off Étaples, Pas-de-Calais. Her crew survived.

== 23 June ==
List of shipwrecks: 23 June 1918
Ship	State	Description
Augvald	Norway	World War I: The cargo ship was sunk in the Atlantic Ocean by SM U-151 (Imperial German Navy) with the loss of three of her crew.
Eagle	United States	The steamer was sunk near Key West, Florida. The crew landed at Key west.
London	United Kingdom	World War I: The cargo ship was torpedoed and sunk in the North Sea 4 nautical miles (7.4 km) north east of Whitby, Yorkshire by SM UB-88 (Imperial German Navy). Her crew survived.
Mountain Laurel	Norway	World War I: The sailing vessel was sunk in the Atlantic Ocean 25 nautical miles (46 km) north west of Rathlin Island, County Antrim, United Kingdom (55°38′N 6°38′W) by SM UB-73 (Imperial German Navy) with the loss of eleven of her crew.

== 24 June ==
List of shipwrecks: 24 June 1918
Ship	State	Description
Caroline	Denmark	World War I: The three-masted schooner was sunk in the Atlantic Ocean north west of Ireland (56°39′N 10°01′W) by SM U-102 (Imperial German Navy). Her crew survived.
HMS D6	Royal Navy	World War I: The D-class submarine was sunk in the Atlantic Ocean 12 nautical miles (22 km) north of Inishtrahull Island, County Donegal (55°37′N 7°15′W) by SM UB-73 (Imperial German Navy) with the loss of 24 of her 26 crew. Both survivors were rescued by SM UB-73.
Maria	Greece	World War I: The sailing vessel was sunk in the Mediterranean Sea south of Syracuse, Sicily, Italy by SM UC-52 (Imperial German Navy).
Saint Antoine	France	World War I: The schooner was sunk in the Mediterranean Sea 15 nautical miles (28 km) off Mahdia, Tunisia by SM UB-68 (Imperial German Navy). Her crew survived.
Sophia	Greece	World War I: The sailing vessel was sunk in the Mediterranean Sea south of Syracuse by SM UC-52 (Imperial German Navy).

== 25 June ==
List of shipwrecks: 25 June 1918
Ship	State	Description
African Transport	United Kingdom	World War I: The cargo ship was torpedoed and sunk in the North Sea 3 nautical miles (5.6 km) north of Whitby, Yorkshire by SM UB-88 (Imperial German Navy) with the loss of three of her crew.
Moorlands	United Kingdom	World War I: The cargo ship was torpedoed and sunk in the North Sea 3 nautical miles (5.6 km) south east of Whitby by SM UB-88 (Imperial German Navy) with the loss of ten of her crew.
Orissa	United Kingdom	World War I: The passenger ship was torpedoed and sunk in the Atlantic Ocean 21 nautical miles (39 km) south west by west of Skerryvore by SM UB-73 (Imperial German Navy) with the loss of six lives.
SMS T59	Imperial German Navy	The torpedo boat collided with another vessel and sank in the Baltic Sea with the loss of 21 of her crew.

== 26 June ==
List of shipwrecks: 26 June 1918
Ship	State	Description
HMT Achilles II	Royal Navy	World War I: The naval trawler struck a mine and sank in the North Sea off the Shipwash Lightship (United Kingdom) (52°04′30″N 1°48′00″E) with the loss of thirteen of her crew.
Atlantian	United Kingdom	World War I: The passenger ship was torpedoed and sunk in the Atlantic Ocean 110 nautical miles (200 km) north west by west of Eagle Island, County Mayo (55°42′N 12°57′W) by SM U-86 (Imperial German Navy). Her crew survived, but two of them were taken as prisoners of war.
Tortuguero	United Kingdom	World War I: The cargo ship was torpedoed and sunk in the Atlantic Ocean 205 nautical miles (380 km) north west of Eagle Island (55°50′N 15°30′W) by SM U-156 (Imperial German Navy) with the loss of twelve of her crew.
SM UC-11	Imperial German Navy	World War I: The Type UC I submarine struck a mine and sank in the Strait of Dover (51°55′N 1°41′E) with the loss of eighteen of her nineteen crew.
Wimmera	United Kingdom	World War I: The passenger ship struck a mine laid by the merchant raider SMS Wolf (Imperial German Navy) and sank in the Pacific Ocean 24 nautical miles (44 km) northwest of Hooper's Point, South Island, New Zealand, with the loss of 10 passengers and 16 of her crew. sixty-six passengers and 59 crew members survived.

== 27 June ==
List of shipwrecks: 27 June 1918
Ship	State	Description
Keelung	United Kingdom	World War I: The cargo ship was torpedoed and sunk in the Atlantic Ocean 110 nautical miles (200 km) west by south of Ouessant, Finistère, France by SM U-53 (Imperial German Navy) with the loss of six crew.
HMHS Llandovery Castle	Royal Canadian Navy	(Red Cross): World War I: The hospital ship was torpedoed and sunk in the Atlantic Ocean 116 nautical miles (215 km) west of the Fastnet Rock by SM U-86 (Imperial German Navy) with the loss of 234 of the 258 people on board.
Sotolongo	Spain	World War I: The cargo ship was sunk in the Mediterranean Sea 35 nautical miles (65 km) off Maritimo Island (38°04′N 11°21′E) by SM U-65 (Imperial German Navy). Her crew survived.

== 28 June ==
List of shipwrecks: 28 June 1918
Ship	State	Description
Dictator	United Kingdom	World War I: The schooner was scuttled in the Atlantic Ocean by SM U-151 (Imperial German Navy). Her crew survived and were taken as prisoners of war.
Elbjorg	Norway	World War I: The sailing vessel was sunk in the North Sea off the Tongue Lightship (United Kingdom) (57°50′N 8°42′E) by SM UC-59 (Imperial German Navy). Her crew survived.
Onondaga	United States	The 2,696-gross register ton cargo ship, on passage from Boston, Massachusetts, to Jacksonville, Florida, via New York City with general cargo, struck Sugar Reef off Watch Hill Point, Watch Hill, Rhode Island, in fog and sank in 10 minutes in up to 50 feet (15 m) of water 0.1 nautical miles (0.19 km; 0.12 mi) west of the reef at 41°17′40″N 071°53′00″W. No one was injured. Her cargo was salvaged.
Pochard	United Kingdom	World War I: The trawler struck a mine and sank in the North Sea 40 nautical miles (74 km) north east of the Spurn Lightship (United Kingdom). Her crew survived.
Queen	United Kingdom	World War I: The cargo ship was torpedoed and sunk in the Atlantic Ocean 130 nautical miles (240 km) north of Cape Villano, Spain (44°25′N 10°25′W) by SM U-53 (Imperial German Navy) with the loss of twenty crew.
Sunniva	United Kingdom	World War I: The cargo ship was torpedoed and sunk in the North Sea 4 nautical miles (7.4 km) east of Sunderland, County Durham by SM UC-17 (Imperial German Navy) with the loss of two of her crew.

== 29 June ==
List of shipwrecks: 29 June 1918
Ship	State	Description
Ariadne	Norway	World War I: The sailing vessel was damaged in the North Sea (57°20′N 5°32′E) by SM UC-59 (Imperial German Navy). She was towed into Frederikshavn but was declared a constructive total loss.
Castor I	Norway	World War I: The sailing vessel was sunk in the North Sea 30 nautical miles (56 km) west of Ragefjord by SM U-107 (Imperial German Navy). Her crew survived.
Drowning Thyra	Denmark	World War I: The auxiliary four-masted schooner was sunk in the North Sea 20 nautical miles (37 km) off Lindesnes, Vest-Agder, Norway (57°30′N 6°42′E) by SM UC-59 (Imperial German Navy). Her crew survived.
Florentia	United Kingdom	World War I: The cargo ship was torpedoed and sunk in the North Sea 2 nautical miles (3.7 km) east by north of Robin Hood's Bay, Yorkshire by SM UB-40 (Imperial German Navy) with the loss of three of her crew.
Grekland	Sweden	World War I: The cargo ship was sunk in the North Sea east of Flamborough Head, Yorkshire (54°09′N 0°02′E) by SM UB-40 (Imperial German Navy), with the loss of one crew member.
Herdis	United Kingdom	World War I: The cargo ship was torpedoed and sunk in the North Sea 7 nautical miles (13 km) south east by south of Robin Hood's Bay (54°20′N 0°20′W) by SM UB-88 (Imperial German Navy). Her crew survived.
Midstjø	Norway	World War I: The sailing vessel was sunk in the Skagerrak 15 nautical miles (28 km) south of the Songvår Lighthouse, Vest-Agder by SM U-80 (Imperial German Navy). Her crew survived.
Sixty-six	United Kingdom	World War I: The cargo ship was torpedoed and sunk in the North Sea 3 nautical miles (5.6 km) east of Scarborough, Yorkshire by SM UB-88 (Imperial German Navy) with the loss of six of her crew.

== 30 June ==
List of shipwrecks: 30 June 1918
Ship	State	Description
Origen	United Kingdom	World War I: The cargo ship was torpedoed and sunk in the Atlantic Ocean 115 nautical miles (213 km) west of Ouessant, Finistère, France by an Imperial German Navy submarine with the loss of a crew member.
W. M. L.	United Kingdom	World War I: The three-masted schooner was shelled and sunk in the Atlantic Ocean 400 nautical miles (740 km) north north west of Cape Finisterre, Spain by SM U-53 (Imperial German Navy) with the loss of four crew.

== Unknown date ==
List of shipwrecks: Unknown date
Ship	State	Description
George L. Eaton	United States	The steamer caught fire and sank in the Atlantic Ocean off Yeu Island, France (45°42′N 38°31′W) on either 22 or 26 June. Her crew was rescued by HMS Coronado (Royal Navy) or by a U.S. Navy frigate.
