= U59 =

U59 may refer to:

- Driggs–Reed Memorial Airport
- German submarine U-59, various vessels
- HMS Lowestoft (U59), a sloop of the Royal Navy
- Small nucleolar RNA SNORD59
- Small nucleolar RNA Z159/U59
