= List of shipwrecks in July 1835 =

The list of shipwrecks in July 1835 includes ships sunk, foundered, wrecked, grounded or otherwise lost during July 1835.

== 4 July ==
List of shipwrecks: 4 July 1835
Ship	State	Description
Lee	United Kingdom	The whaler was lost in the Davis Strait off the "Dark Head". Her crew were rescued.

== 8 July ==
List of shipwrecks: 8 July 1835
Ship	State	Description
Micood Packet	(United Kingdom of Great Britain and Ireland) Saint Lucia	The drogher was driven ashore and wrecked in Micood Bay.

== 9 July ==
List of shipwrecks: 9 July 1835
Ship	State	Description
James	United Kingdom	The ship was wrecked at Cape Ray, Newfoundland, British North America. She was on a voyage from Philadelphia, Pennsylvania, United States to Quebec City, Lower Canada, British North America.
Nathaniel Graham	United Kingdom	The brig was wrecked on Cape Ray with the loss of 43 lives. She was on a voyage from Cork to Quebec City.

== 14 July ==
List of shipwrecks: 14 July 1835
Ship	State	Description
Four Sisters	United Kingdom	The ship was wrecked on "Langley Island", Newfoundland, British North America. Her crew were rescued. She was on a voyage from Quebec City, Lower Canada, British North America to Liverpool, Lancashire.
Ingulets (Ингулец)	Imperial Russian Navy	The transport ship ran aground on a reef and subsequently capsized near the southern cape of Gelendzhik Bay. Her crew were rescued. She was on a voyage from Sevastopol to Gelendzhik. Ingulets broke up on 22 August.
Lord Stormont	United Kingdom	The ship was wrecked on "Langley Island". Her crew were rescued.

== 15 July ==
List of shipwrecks: 15 July 1835
Ship	State	Description
Aurora	United Kingdom	The brig was wrecked on Brion Island, Quebec City, Lower Canada, British North America. She was on a voyage from Bathurst, New Brunswick, British North America to Aberystwyth, Cardiganshire.
Ternau	flag unknown	The ship struck a rock and sank at Saint Petersburg, Russia.

== 16 July ==
List of shipwrecks: 16 July 1835
Ship	State	Description
Shannon	United Kingdom	The ship was wrecked on Anegada, Virgin Islands. Her crew were rescued.

== 17 July ==
List of shipwrecks: 17 July 1835
Ship	State	Description
Enchantress	United Kingdom	The ship was lost in the D'Entrecasteaux Channel, at the mouth of the Derwent River, Van Diemens Land. All on board survived.
Forth	United Kingdom	The ship departed from Manila, Spanish East Indies for London. No further trace, presumed foundered with the loss of all hands.

== 18 July ==
List of shipwrecks: 18 July 1835
Ship	State	Description
Constantia	Belgium	The ship was wrecked on Great Heneaga, Bahamas. She was on a voyage from St. Jago de Cuba, Cuba to Antwerp.

== 20 July ==
List of shipwrecks: 20 July 1835
Ship	State	Description
Emerald	United Kingdom	The ship was in collision with Utica (France) in the Atlantic Ocean and was abandoned by her crew. She was on a voyage from Quebec City, Lower Canada, British North America to Liverpool, Lancashire.

== 21 July ==
List of shipwrecks: 21 July 1835
Ship	State	Description
Rosa	Spain	The ship was wrecked on Heneaga. She was on a voyage from Málaga to Havana, Cuba.

== 22 July ==
List of shipwrecks: 22 July 1835
Ship	State	Description
Aurora	United Kingdom	The ship ran aground on Byron Island, in the Gulf of St. Lawrence and was abandoned by her crew. She floated off the next day and was subsequently taken to the Magdalen Islands, Lower Canada, British North America.

== 23 July ==
List of shipwrecks: 23 July 1835
Ship	State	Description
Sector	(United Kingdom of Great Britain and Ireland) Saint Vincent	The drogher was wrecked with the loss of five of her crew.

== 24 July ==
List of shipwrecks: 24 July 1835
Ship	State	Description
Atlantic	United States	The ship was wrecked on Grand Cayman. She was on a voyage from Havre de Grâce, Seine-Inférieure, France to New Orleans, Louisiana.

== 26 July ==
List of shipwrecks: 26 July 1835
Ship	State	Description
Greenock	United Kingdom	The brig was wrecked near Halifax, Nova Scotia, British North America. Her crew were rescued. She was on a voyage from Jamaica to Quebec City, Lower Canada, British North America.
Warwick	United Kingdom	The ship was wrecked near "Cape Ballans", Newfoundland, British North America. She was on a voyage from Demerara to Saint John's, Newfoundland.

== 27 July ==
List of shipwrecks: 27 July 1835
Ship	State	Description
Sally	United Kingdom	The ship was driven ashore at Hamra, Gotland, Sweden. She was on a voyage from Saint Petersburg, Russia to Dumfries.

== 28 July ==
List of shipwrecks: 28 July 1835
Ship	State	Description
Friends	United Kingdom	The sloop capsized and sank in the Firth of Clyde 3 nautical miles (5.6 km) west of Horse Isle with the loss of one of her four crew. Survivors were rescued by Robertson (United Kingdom).

== 30 July ==
List of shipwrecks: 30 July 1835
Ship	State	Description
Aurora	Russia	The ship struck an anchor and sank at Kronstadt.
Greenock	United Kingdom	The ship was wrecked near Halifax, Nova Scotia, British North America. She was on a voyage from Jamaica to Quebec City, Lower Canada, British North America.
Susan	United Kingdom	The ship foundered in the Atlantic Ocean (48°N 17°W). Her crew were rescued. She was on a voyage from Torquay, Devon to Miramichi, New Brunswick, British North America.

== Unknown date ==
List of shipwrecks: Unknown date 1835
Ship	State	Description
Apparancen	Sweden	The ship foundered off Skagen, Denmark before 1 August. She was on a voyage from an English port to Gothenburg. There were at least three survivors.
Broad Oak	United Kingdom	The ship was driven ashore at Pernambuco, Brazil before 15 July.
Coquette	United States	The whaler was last sighted homeward bound in July. No further trace, presumed foundered.
Enily Taylor	(United Kingdom of Great Britain and Ireland) Western Australia	The ship was wrecked near Fremantle before 11 July.
Orion	United Kingdom	The ship was lost near Cape Ray, Newfoundland, British North America before 4 July.
Reform	United Kingdom	The smack foundered in the Irish Sea off the Crow Rock before 29 July with the loss of all hands.
Thetis	flag unknown	The ship was abandoned in the North Sea 30 nautical miles (56 km) off the coast of Jutland before 25 July. Her crew were rescued.
