= German submarine U-59 =

U-59 may refer to one of the following German submarines:

- SM U-59, a Type U 57 submarine launched in 1916 and that served in the First World War until sunk on 14 May 1917
  - During the First World War, Germany also had these submarines with similar names:
    - SM UB-59, a Type UB III submarine launched in 1917 and scuttled on 5 October 1918
    - SM UC-59, a Type UC II submarine launched in 1916 and surrendered on 21 November 1918; broken up at Bo'ness in 1920–21
- German submarine U-59 (1938), a Type IIC submarine that served in the Second World War until stricken in April 1945; scuttled at Kiel
