= SS Princess Maud (1902) =

History
- Name: SS Princess Maud
- Owner: 1902-1918: London and North Western Railway
- Operator: 1902-1916: London and North Western Railway; 1916-1918: Commissioned fleet; 1908-1918: London and North Western Railway
- Port of registry: 114008
- Builder: Napier and Miller, Yoker yard
- Launched: 14 November 1901
- Fate: Torpedoed and sunk 10 June 1918

General characteristics
- Type: Steel screw steamer
- Tonnage: 1566
- Length: 256.5 feet (78.2 m)
- Beam: 36.7 feet (11.2 m)
- Depth: 16.4 feet (5.0 m)

The SS Princess Maud was a single screw passenger/cargo steamship completed in 1902 for the London and North Western Railway.

She was torpedoed and sunk in the North Sea about 5 miles (8.0 km) north east by north from Blyth, Northumberland on 10 June 1918 by a German submarine variously quoted to be UB-88 or UB-34.
