= Small nucleolar RNA SNORD59 =

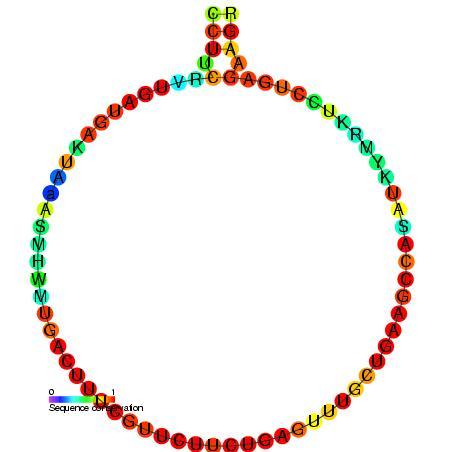
- Predicted secondary structure and sequence conservation of SNORD59

Identifiers
- Symbol: SNORD59
- Alt. Symbols: U59
- Rfam: RF00273

Other data
- RNA type: Gene; snRNA; snoRNA; CD-box
- Domain: Eukaryota
- GO: GO:0006396 GO:0005730
- SO: SO:0000593
- PDB structures: PDBe

In molecular biology, snoRNA U59 is an RNA molecule that belongs to the C/D class of snoRNA, which contain the C box motif (UGAUGA) and the D box motif (CUGA). Most of the members of the box C/D family function in directing site-specific 2'-O-methylation of substrate RNAs. There are two closely related copies of U59, called SNORD59A and SNORD59B. They are both expressed from the intron of the host gene ATP5A. Both SNORD59A and SNORD59B target the 2'-O-methylation of 18S rRNA position A1031. This RNA has been identified in both the human and mouse genomes. Not to be confused with the plant snoRNA U59.
