= SM U-151 =

German U-boat from WW1

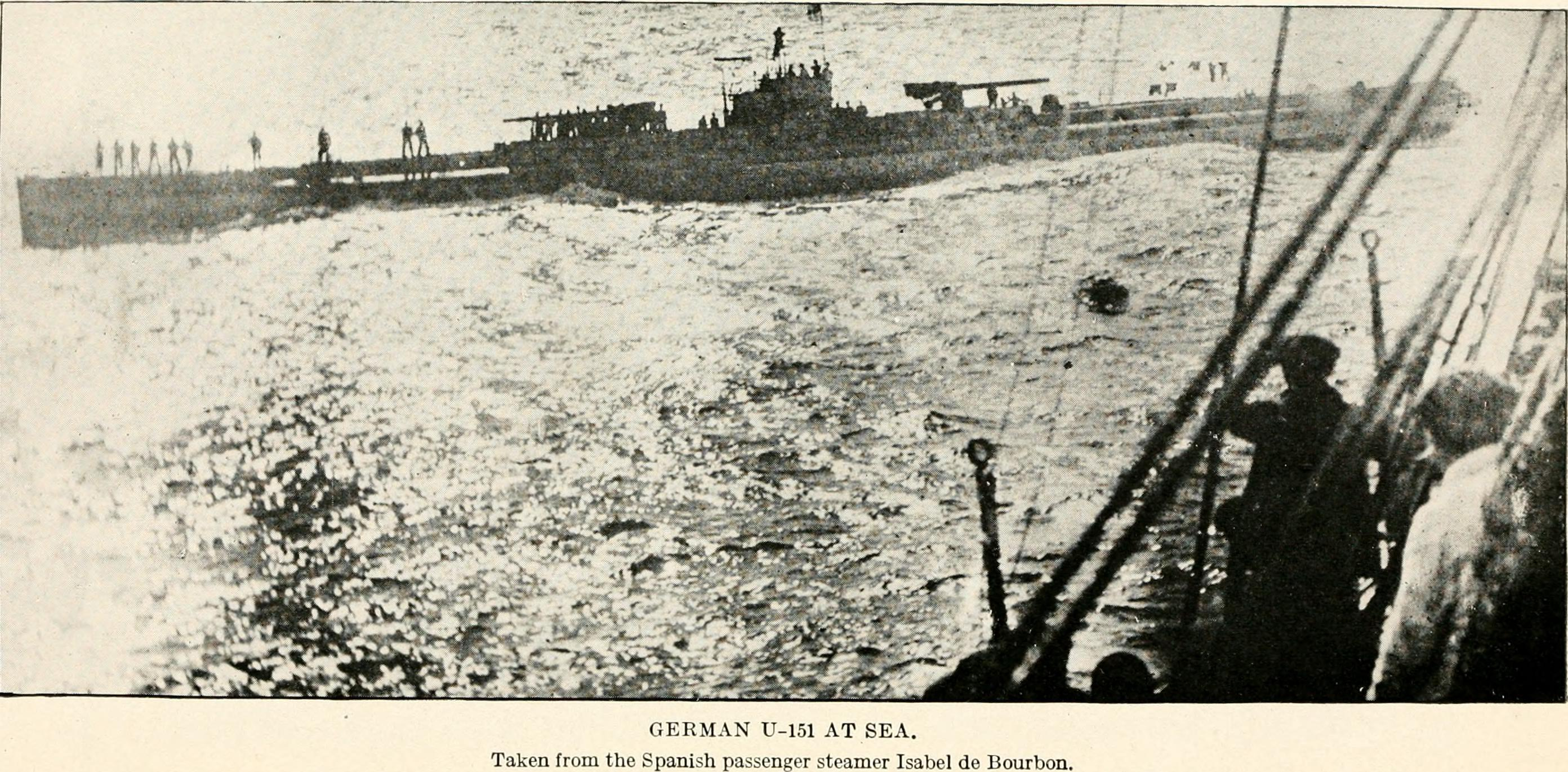
- U-151 at sea

History

German Empire
- Name: U-151
- Ordered: 29 November 1916
- Builder: Reiherstieg Schiffswerfte & Maschinenfabrik, Hamburg
- Yard number: 303
- Launched: 4 April 1917
- Commissioned: 21 July 1917
- Captured: Surrendered to France at Cherbourg
- Fate: Sunk as target ship at Cherbourg, 7 June 1921

General characteristics
- Class & type: Type U 151 submarine
- Displacement: 1,512 tonnes (1,488 long tons) (surfaced); 1,875 tonnes (1,845 long tons) (submerged); 2,272 tonnes (2,236 long tons) (total)
- Length: 65.00 m (213 ft 3 in) (o/a); 57.00 m (187 ft) (pressure hull)
- Beam: 8.90 m (29 ft 2 in) (o/a); 5.80 m (19 ft) (pressure hull)
- Height: 9.25 m (30 ft 4 in)
- Draught: 5.30 m (17 ft 5 in)
- Installed power: 800 PS (590 kW; 790 bhp) (surfaced); 800 PS (590 kW; 790 bhp) (submerged)
- Propulsion: 2 × shafts, 2 × 1.60 m (5 ft 3 in) propellers
- Speed: 12.4 knots (23.0 km/h; 14.3 mph) surfaced; 5.2 knots (9.6 km/h; 6.0 mph) submerged
- Range: 25,000 nmi (46,000 km; 29,000 mi) at 5.5 knots (10.2 km/h; 6.3 mph) surfaced, 65 nmi (120 km; 75 mi) at 3 knots (5.6 km/h; 3.5 mph) submerged
- Test depth: 50 metres (160 ft)
- Complement: 6 officers, 50 enlisted
- Armament: 2 50 cm (20 in) bow torpedo tubes; 18 torpedoes; 2 × 15 cm (5.9 in) SK L/45 deck guns with 1672 rounds; 2 × 8.8 cm (3.5 in) SK L/30 deck guns with 764 rounds

Service record
- Part of: U-Kreuzer Flotilla; 21 July 1917 – 11 November 1918
- Commanders: K.Kapt. Waldemar Kophamel; 21 July –26 December 1917; K.Kapt. Heinrich von Nostitz und Jänckendorff; 27 December 1917 – 11 November 1918
- Operations: 4 patrols
- Victories: 34 merchant ships sunk (88,395 GRT); 6 merchant ships damaged (13,267 GRT); 1 warship damaged (1,025 tons)

SM U-151 or SM Unterseeboot 151 (ex U Oldenburg) was a World War I U-boat of the Imperial German Navy, constructed by Reiherstieg Schiffswerfte & Maschinenfabrik at Hamburg and launched on 4 April 1917. From 1917 until the Armistice in November 1918 she was part of the U-Kreuzer Flotilla, and was responsible for 34 ships sunk (88,395 GRT) and 7 ships damaged (13,267 GRT and 1,025 tons).

== Background ==
U-151 was originally one of seven Deutschland class U-boats designed to carry cargo between the United States and Germany in 1916. Five of the submarine freighters were converted into long-range cruiser U-boats (U-kreuzers) equipped with two 15 cm (5.9 in) SK L/45 deck guns, including U-151 which was originally to have been named Oldenburg. The Type U 151 class were the largest U-boats of World War I.

== Service history ==
U-151 was commissioned on 21 July 1917. From 21 July to 26 December 1917 she was commanded by Waldemar Kophamel who took U-151 on a long-range cruise which eventually covered a total of 12,000 miles. On 19 September 1917 U-151 claimed her first victim, the 3,104 GRT French sailing ship Blanche in the Atlantic Ocean. On 2 or 12 October 1917 (sources differ), she collided with the Royal Navy Q-ship HMS Begonia in the Atlantic Ocean off Casablanca, French Morocco, sinking Begonia. On 20 November 1917 U-151 captured the steamship Johan Mjelde, and scuttled her on 26 November after transferring 22 tons of her cargo of copper.

=== American cruise ===
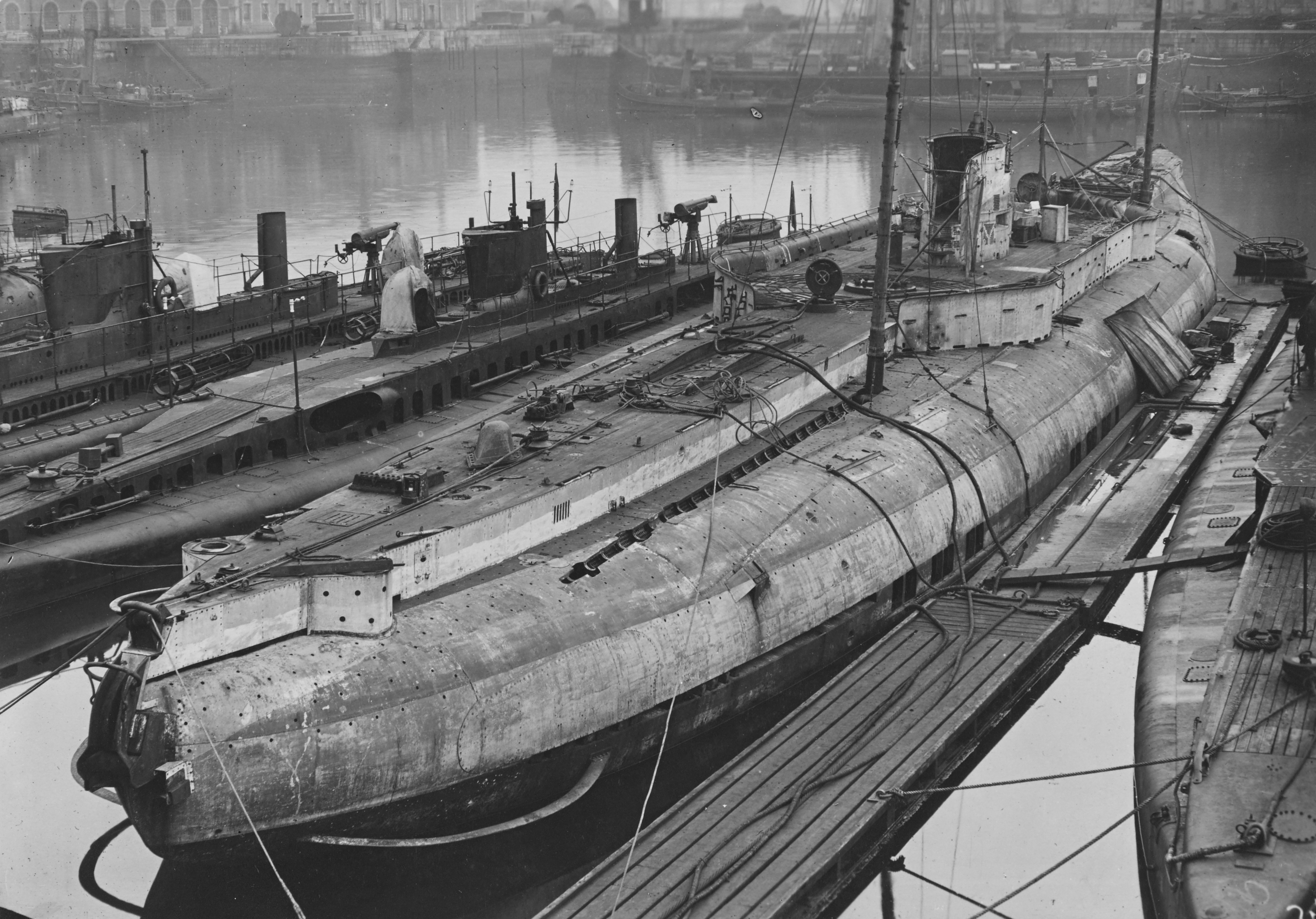
U-151 in French hands after the war, circa 1920

U-151 left Kiel on 14 April 1918 commanded by Korvettenkapitän Heinrich von Nostitz und Jänckendorff, her mission to attack American shipping. She arrived off the United States East Coast on 21 May, laid mines off the Delaware Capes and cut the submerged telegraph cables which connected New York City with Nova Scotia. On 25 May she stopped three American schooners off Virginia, took their crews prisoner, and sank the three ships by gunfire.

On 2 June 1918, known to some historians as "Black Sunday", U-151 sank six American ships and damaged one off the coast of New Jersey in the space of a few hours. The next day the tanker Herbert L. Pratt struck a mine previously laid by U-151 in the area, but the Pratt was later salvaged. Thirteen people died in the seven sinkings, their deaths caused by a capsized lifeboat from SS Carolina.

On 9 June 1918, U-151 stopped the Norwegian cargo ship Vindeggen off Cape Hatteras, North Carolina. Scuttling charges were rigged aboard her, then she was escorted outside the shipping lane under a prize crew. Von Nostitz then transferred 70 tons of copper ingots from Vindeggen to U-151. On 14 June U-151 followed this with the sinking of the Norwegian barque Samoa, en route from Walvis Bay, South-West Africa, to Perth Amboy, New Jersey, with a cargo of copper ore, by gunfire 90 miles (140 km)s off the Virginia coast. There were no casualties. On 18 June, U-151 sank the steamship SS Dwinsk, and then loitered near Dwinsk's lifeboats in the hopes that more Allied shipping would be attracted to them. Through this ruse, she launched torpedoes at the U.S. Navy auxiliary cruiser and troopship USS Von Steuben, but missed and was instead depth charged by Von Steuben. On 28 June, U-151 captured SS Dictator and made its crew prisoners of war. Among those taken were four men from Newfoundland.

U-151 returned to Kiel on 20 July 1918 after a 94-day cruise in which she had covered a distance of 10,915 nmi (20,215 km; 12,561 mi). Her commander reported that she had sunk 23 ships totalling 61,000 tons and had laid mines responsible for the sinking of another four vessels.

== Fate ==
At the end of the war U-151 surrendered to France at Cherbourg. The French Navy sank her as a target on 7 June 1921.

== Summary of raiding history ==
Date	Name	Nationality	Tonnage (Note: Merchant ship tonnages are in gross register tons. Military vessels are listed by tons displacement.)	Fate
19 September 1917	Blanche	France	3,104	Sunk
1 October 1917	Etna	Kingdom of Italy	5,604	Sunk
2 October 1917	Viajante	Portugal	377	Sunk
4 October 1917	Bygdønes	Norway	2,849	Sunk
12 October 1917	HMS Parthian	Royal Navy	1,025	Damaged
13 October 1917	Caprera	Kingdom of Italy	5,040	Sunk
19 October 1917	Harpon	France	1,484	Damaged
20 October 1917	Moyori Maru	Empire of Japan	3,746	Sunk
21 October 1917	Gryfevale	United Kingdom	4,437	Sunk
2 November 1917	Acary	Brazil	4,275	Sunk
2 November 1917	Guahyba	Brazil	1,891	Sunk
16 November 1917	Margaret L. Roberts	United States	535	Sunk
21 November 1917	Sobral	Norway	1,075	Sunk
22 November 1917	Tijuca	France	2,543	Sunk
23 November 1917	Trombetas	Portugal	235	Sunk
26 November 1917	Johan Mjelde	Norway	2,049	Sunk
4 December 1917	Claudio	Spain	2,588	Damaged
24 May 1918	Edna	United States	325	Damaged
25 May 1918	Hattie Dunn	United States	435	Sunk
25 May 1918	Hauppauge	United States	1,446	Damaged
2 June 1918	Carolina	United States	5,093	Sunk
2 June 1918	Edward H. Cole	United States	1,791	Sunk
2 June 1918	Edward R. Baird Jr	United States	279	Damaged
2 June 1918	Isabel B. Wiley	United States	776	Sunk
2 June 1918	Jacob M. Haskell	United States	1,778	Sunk
2 June 1918	Texel	United States	3,210	Sunk
2 June 1918	Winneconne	United States	1,869	Sunk
3 June 1918	Samuel C. Mengel	United States	915	Sunk
3 June 1918	Herbert L. Pratt	United States	7,145	Damaged
4 June 1918	Eidsvold	Norway	1,570	Sunk
5 June 1918	Harpathian	United Kingdom	4,588	Sunk
5 June 1918	Vinland	Norway	1,143	Sunk
8 June 1918	Pinar Del Rio	United States	2,504	Sunk
10 June 1918	Henrik Lund	Norway	4,226	Sunk
10 June 1918	Vindeggen	Norway	3,179	Sunk
14 June 1918	Kringsjaa	Norway	1,750	Sunk
14 June 1918	Samoa	Norway	1,138	Sunk
18 June 1918	Dwinsk	United Kingdom	8,173	Sunk
22 June 1918	Chilier	Belgium	2,966	Sunk
23 June 1918	Augvald	Norway	3,406	Sunk
28 June 1918	Dictator	United Kingdom	125	Sunk

== See also ==
- USS Von Steuben, one of the ships she unsuccessfully attacked in 1918.

== Bibliography ==
- Evening Public Ledger (5 June 1918). "Stung by the Sea Asp, the Tanker Pratt lay partially submerged off Lewes". Evening Public Ledger. Philadelphia. OCLC 701513196.
- Gibson, R.H.; Prendergast, Maurice (2002). The German Submarine War 1914-1918. Periscope Publishing Ltd. ISBN 1-904381-08-1.
- Gröner, Erich; Jung, Dieter; Maass, Martin (1991). German Warships 1815–1945, U-boats and Mine Warfare Vessels. Vol. 2. Translated by Thomas, Keith; Magowan, Rachel. London: Conway Maritime Press. ISBN 0-85177-593-4.
- Jung, Dieter (2004). Die Schiffe der Kaiserlichen Marine 1914-1918 und ihr Verbleib [German Imperial Navy ships 1914-1918 and their fate] (in German). Bonn: Bernard & Graefe. ISBN 3-7637-6247-7.
- McCartney, Innes (2002). Lost patrols : submarine wrecks of the English Channel. Penzance: Periscope. ISBN 978-1-90438-104-4.
- Karl Plath: U-Kreuzer 151 greift an. U-Kreuzerfahrten nach Afrika und Amerika, Potsdam (Voggenreiter) 1937. English edition: Celestino Corraliza (Ed.): U-Cruiser 151 Attacks, Trident Publishing 2022. ISBN 1959764551. ISBN 978-1959764557
