= USS Bittern (AM-36) =

Minesweeper of the United States Navy

History

United States
- Name: USS Bittern
- Builder: Alabama Dry Dock and Shipbuilding Co., Mobile, Alabama
- Cost: $761,587 (hull and machinery)
- Launched: 15 February 1919
- Commissioned: 28 May 1919, as Minesweeper No.36
- Reclassified: AM-36, 17 July 1920
- Fate: Scuttled in Manila Bay, 10 December 1941

General characteristics
- Class & type: Lapwing-class minesweeper
- Displacement: 840 long tons (853 t)
- Length: 187 ft 10 in (57.25 m)
- Beam: 35 ft 6 in (10.82 m)
- Draft: 9 ft 10 in (3.00 m)
- Speed: 14 knots (26 km/h; 16 mph)
- Complement: 72
- Armament: 2 × 3 in (76 mm) guns; 2 × machine guns

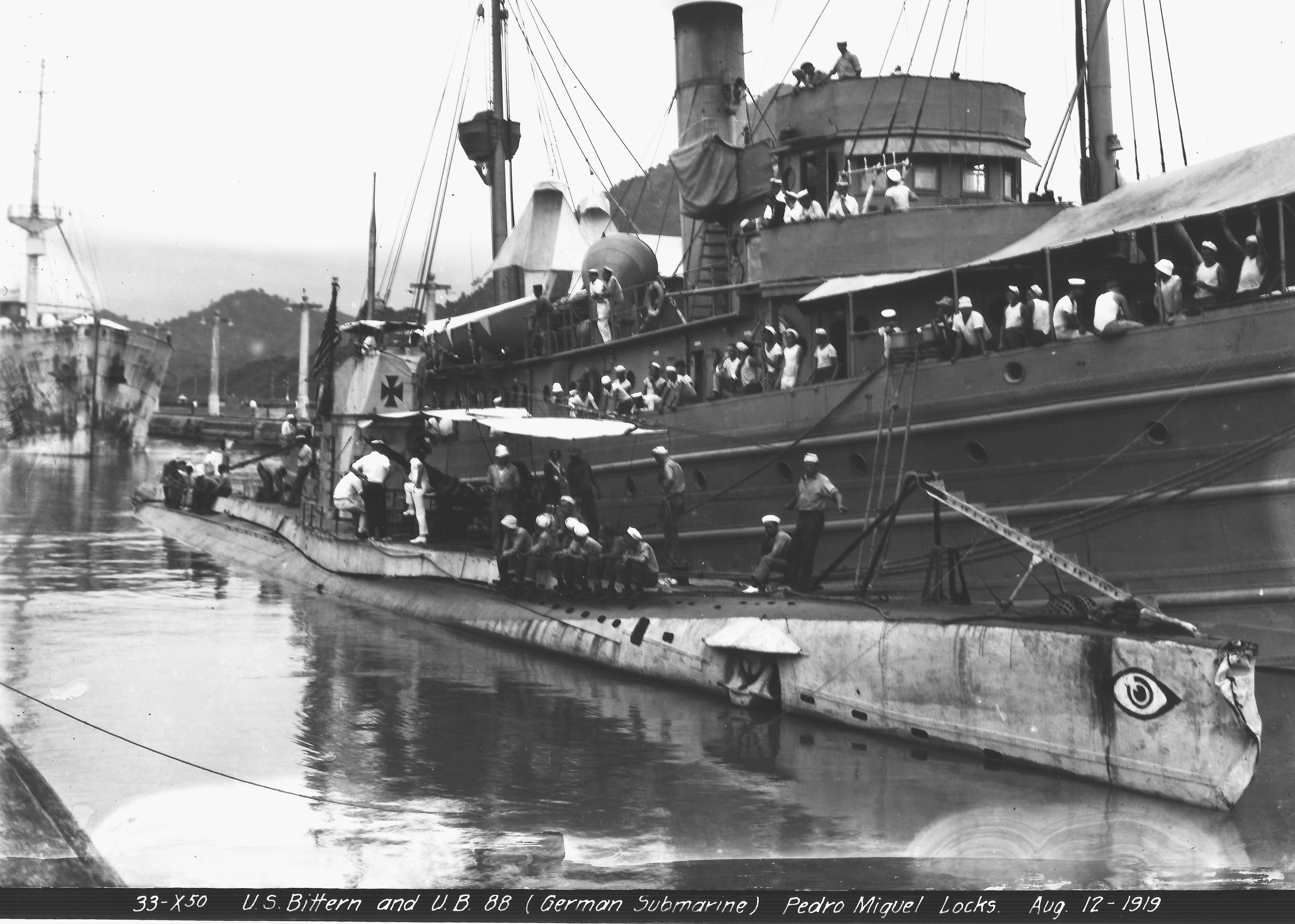
USS Bittern with UB-88

USS Bittern (AM-36) was a Lapwing-class minesweeper in the United States Navy. She was named after the bittern, a bird of the heron family. The vessel was constructed by Alabama Dry Dock and Shipbuilding Co., in Mobile, Alabama, and launched on 15 February 1919 and commissioned on 28 May later that year. Initially operating in U.S. coastal waters, the vessel was reassigned to western Pacific operations in 1920, based in the Philippine Islands. Shortly after the U.S. entry into World War II, Bittern was scuttled to avoid capture after being severely damaged during a Japanese air raid on Cavite Navy Yard in December 1941.

== Construction and career ==
Bittern was launched 15 February 1919 by Alabama Dry Dock and Shipbuilding Co., Mobile, Alabama; sponsored by Mrs. C. R. Doll; and commissioned 28 May 1919. Bittern's first duty was as tender to the captured German submarine SM UB-88 while she made an exhibition tour of the U.S. Gulf Coast and U.S. West Coast ports.

In January 1920 Bittern sailed for the Far East where she remained for the rest of her active service. Throughout most of the next 21 years she wintered at Cavite, Philippine Islands, and summered at Chefoo, China. But the routine was broken occasionally by assignment to scientific expeditions and in September 1923 by relief work following the Yokohama, Japan, earthquake.

=== Fate ===
The Japanese air raid on Cavite Navy Yard on 10 December 1941 found Bittern undergoing repairs. Although not hit, Bittern suffered extensive damage from fire, near misses, and flying debris from USS Sealion moored alongside. Too badly damaged for repair, the minesweeper was scuttled in Manila Bay during the Battle of Bataan, after her crew had transferred to USS Quail.
