= Russian destroyer Kerch =

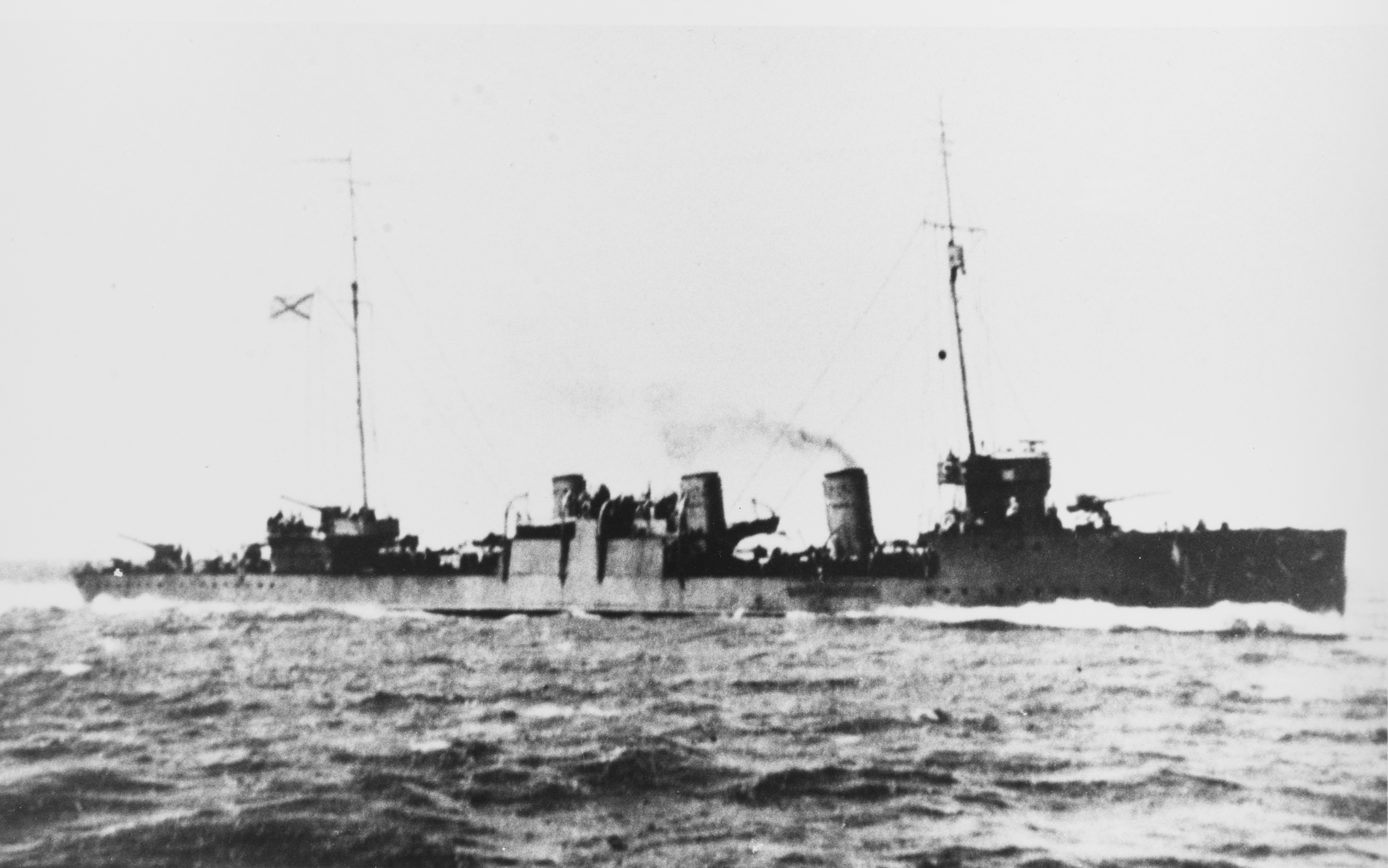
- Sister ship Fidonisy in 1917

History

Russian Empire
- Name: Kerch (Керчь)
- Namesake: Battle of Kerch Strait
- Ordered: 17 March 1915
- Builder: Russud Shipyard, Nikolayev
- Laid down: 29 October 1915
- Launched: 18 May 1916
- Commissioned: 27 June 1917
- Fate: Scuttled, 19 June 1918

General characteristics (as built)
- Class & type: Fidonisy-class destroyer
- Displacement: 1,326 long tons (1,347 t) (normal); 1,580 long tons (1,610 t) (full load)
- Length: 92.51 m (303 ft 6 in)
- Beam: 9.05 m (29 ft 8 in)
- Draft: 3.81 m (12 ft 6 in)
- Installed power: 5 Thornycroft boilers; 29,000 shp (22,000 kW)
- Propulsion: 2 shafts; 2 steam turbines
- Speed: 31 knots (57 km/h; 36 mph)
- Range: 1,850 nmi (3,430 km; 2,130 mi) at 18 knots (33 km/h; 21 mph)
- Complement: 136
- Armament: 4 × single 102 mm (4 in) guns; 2 × single 57 mm (2.2 in) AA guns; 4 × single 7.62 mm (0.3 in) machine guns; 4 × triple 450 mm (17.7 in) torpedo tubes; 80 mines

Kerch (Керчь) was one of eight Fidonisy-class destroyers built for the Imperial Russian Navy during World War I. Completed in 1917, she played a minor role in the war as part of the Black Sea Fleet before the Russian Revolution began later that year. Her crew joined the Bolsheviks in December and the ship supported their efforts to assert control in the Crimea over the next several months. The ship sailed from Sevastopol as the Germans approached in April 1918, but was scuttled in Novorossiysk harbor the following month when the Germans demanded that she be handed over as per the terms of the Treaty of Brest-Litovsk. The Soviets attempted to refloat her in 1929, but the wreck broke apart while being lifted. Three years later they successfully salvaged her engine room and incorporated her steam turbines into a power station in Tuapse.

== Design and description ==
The Fidonisy-class ships were designed as improved version of the Derzky class with an additional 102-millimeter (4 in) gun. Kerch had an overall length of 92.51 meters (303 ft 6 in), a beam of 9.05 meters (29 ft 8 in), and a draft of 3.2 meters (10 ft 6 in) at full load. The ship displaced 1,326 long tons (1,347 t) at normal load and 1,580 long tons (1,610 t) at full load. She was propelled by two Parsons steam turbines, each driving one propeller, designed to produce a total of 29,000 shaft horsepower (22,000 kW) using steam from five three-drum Thorneycroft boilers for an intended maximum speed of 33 knots (61 km/h; 38 mph). During her sea trials, the ship reached a speed of 31.1 knots (57.6 km/h; 35.8 mph) from 28,400 shp (21,200 kW). No records survive of Kerch's range trials, but her sister ships had ranges between 1,850 nautical miles (3,430 km; 2,130 mi) at 18 knots (33 km/h; 21 mph) (Fidonisy) to 1,500 nmi (2,800 km; 1,700 mi) at 20 knots (37 km/h; 23 mph) (Gadzhibey). Her crew numbered 136 men.

The ships mounted a main armament of four single 102 mm Pattern 1911 Obukhov guns. Unhappy with the reliability of the 40-millimeter (1.6 in) anti-aircraft gun, the navy replaced them with a pair of 57-millimeter (2.2 in) Hotchkiss guns which were installed after she was completed. Kerch was also fitted with four 7.62-millimeter (0.3 in) M-1 machine guns. The destroyers mounted four triple 450-millimeter (17.7 in) torpedo tube mounts amidships with a pair of reload torpedoes and could carry 80 M1908 naval mines. They were also fitted with a Barr and Stroud rangefinder and two 60-centimeter (24 in) searchlights. Kerch was delivered without her gunnery and torpedo fire-control systems and they were installed after she was commissioned.

== Construction and service ==
The eight Fidonisy-class destroyers were ordered on 17 March 1915 at a cost of 2.2 million rubles each. All of them received names in honor of the victories of Admiral Fyodor Ushakov. Among these was Kerch, commemorating Ushakov's victory at the Battle of Kerch Strait in 1790. After being added to the Black Sea Fleet ship list on 2 July 1915, Kerch was laid down in the Russud Shipyard in Nikolayev on 29 October 1915. The ship was launched on 18 May 1916 and completed on 27 June 1917. She was assigned to the Third Division of Destroyers and escorted a minelaying mission in July. The navy ceased offensive operations against the Central Powers in early November in response to the Bolshevik Decree on Peace before a formal Armistice was signed the next month. Her crew joined the Bolsheviks the following month.

In January 1918 the ship supported Bolshevik efforts to consolidate their power in Yevpatoria and Feodosia, Crimea, and bombarded Romanian troops in the Danube estuary. The next month, Kerch participated in a punitive expedition against Novorossiysk to suppress anti-Bolshevik elements. On 29 April the ship sailed from Sevastopol to Novorossiysk to avoid being seized by advancing German forces. On 18 June, the ship scuttled the battleship Svobodnaya Rossiya and her sister ship Fidonisy in Tsemes Bay with her torpedoes to avoid turning them over to the Germans in accordance with the terms of the Treaty of Brest-Litovsk. The next day Kerch sailed to Tuapse and scuttled herself off the harbor entrance. On 22 November 1922 the Soviet salvage organization EPRON attempted to raise her wreck, but it broke into pieces while being lifted. They raised her engine rooms in December 1932 and the repaired turbines were installed in the Tuapse power plant.

== Bibliography ==
- Apalkov, Yu. V. (1996). Боевые корабли Русского флота 8.1914-10.1917 гг. Справочник [Directory of Russian Navy Warships, August 1914–October 1917] (in Russian). St. Petersburg: Intek. ISBN 5-7559-0018-3.
- Berezhnoy, Sergey (2002). Крейсера и миноносцы. Справочник [Guide to Cruisers and Destroyers] (in Russian). Moscow: Voenizdat. ISBN 5-203-01780-8.
- Greger, René (1972). The Russian Fleet, 1914–1917. Shepperton, UK: Ian Allan. ISBN 0-7110-0255-X.
- Chernyshev, Alexander (2011). Русские суперэсминцы. Легендарные "Новики" [Russian Superdestroyers: Legendary Noviks] (in Russian) (2nd ed.). Moscow: Yauza/Eksmo. ISBN 978-5-699-53144-8.
- Verstyuk, Anatoly & Gordeyev, Stanislav (2006). Корабли Минных дивизий. От "Новика" до "Гогланда" [Torpedo Division Ships: From Novik to Gogland] (in Russian). Moscow: Voennaya Kniga. ISBN 5-902863-10-4.
