= SM UB-105 =

- UB-148 at sea, a U-boat similar to UB-105.

History

German Empire
- Name: UB-105
- Ordered: 6 / 8 February 1917
- Builder: Blohm & Voss, Hamburg
- Cost: 3,714,000 German Papiermark
- Yard number: 311
- Launched: 7 July 1917
- Commissioned: 14 January 1918
- Fate: Surrendered 16 January 1919, broken up in Felixtowe in 1922.

General characteristics
- Class & type: Type UB III submarine
- Displacement: 510 t (500 long tons) surfaced; 629 t (619 long tons) submerged
- Length: 55.30 m (181 ft 5 in) (o/a)
- Beam: 5.80 m (19 ft)
- Draught: 3.70 m (12 ft 2 in)
- Propulsion: 2 × propeller shaft; 2 × MAN-Vulcan four-stroke 6-cylinder diesel engines, 1,085 bhp (809 kW); 2 × Siemens-Schuckert electric motors, 780 shp (580 kW)
- Speed: 13.3 knots (24.6 km/h; 15.3 mph) surfaced; 7.5 knots (13.9 km/h; 8.6 mph) submerged
- Range: 7,420 nmi (13,740 km; 8,540 mi) at 6 knots (11 km/h; 6.9 mph) surfaced; 55 nmi (102 km; 63 mi) at 4 knots (7.4 km/h; 4.6 mph) submerged
- Test depth: 50 m (160 ft)
- Complement: 3 officers, 31 men
- Armament: 5 × 50 cm (19.7 in) torpedo tubes (4 bow, 1 stern); 10 torpedoes; 1 × 8.8 cm (3.46 in) deck gun

Service record
- Part of: Mittelmeer I Flotilla; 8 May – 11 November 1918
- Commanders: Kptlt. Wilhelm Marschall; 14 January – 9 September 1918; Oblt.z.S. Rudolf Petersen; 10 September – 30 November 1918
- Operations: 5 patrols
- Victories: 24 merchant ships sunk (63,396 GRT); 1 warship sunk (1,290 tons); 1 auxiliary warship sunk (1,368 GRT)

SM UB-105 was a German Type UB III submarine or U-boat in the Imperial German Navy during World War I. She was commissioned into the Imperial German Navy on 14 January 1918 as SM UB-105. (Note: "SM" stands for "Seiner Majestät" (English: His Majesty's) and combined with the U for Unterseeboot would be translated as His Majesty's Submarine.)

UB-105 was surrendered to Britain on 16 January 1919 and broken up in Felixstowe in 1922.

== Construction ==
She was built by Blohm & Voss of Hamburg and following just under a year of construction, launched at Hamburg on 7 July 1917. UB-105 was commissioned early the next year under the command of Kptlt. Wilhelm Marschall. Like all Type UB III submarines, UB-105 carried 10 torpedoes and was armed with a 8.8 cm (3.46 in) deck gun. UB-105 would carry a crew of up to 3 officer and 31 men and had a cruising range of 7,420 nautical miles (13,740 km; 8,540 mi). UB-105 had a displacement of 510 t (500 long tons) while surfaced and 629 t (619 long tons) when submerged. Her engines enabled her to travel at 13.3 knots (24.6 km/h; 15.3 mph) when surfaced and 7.4 knots (13.7 km/h; 8.5 mph) when submerged.

== Summary of raiding history ==
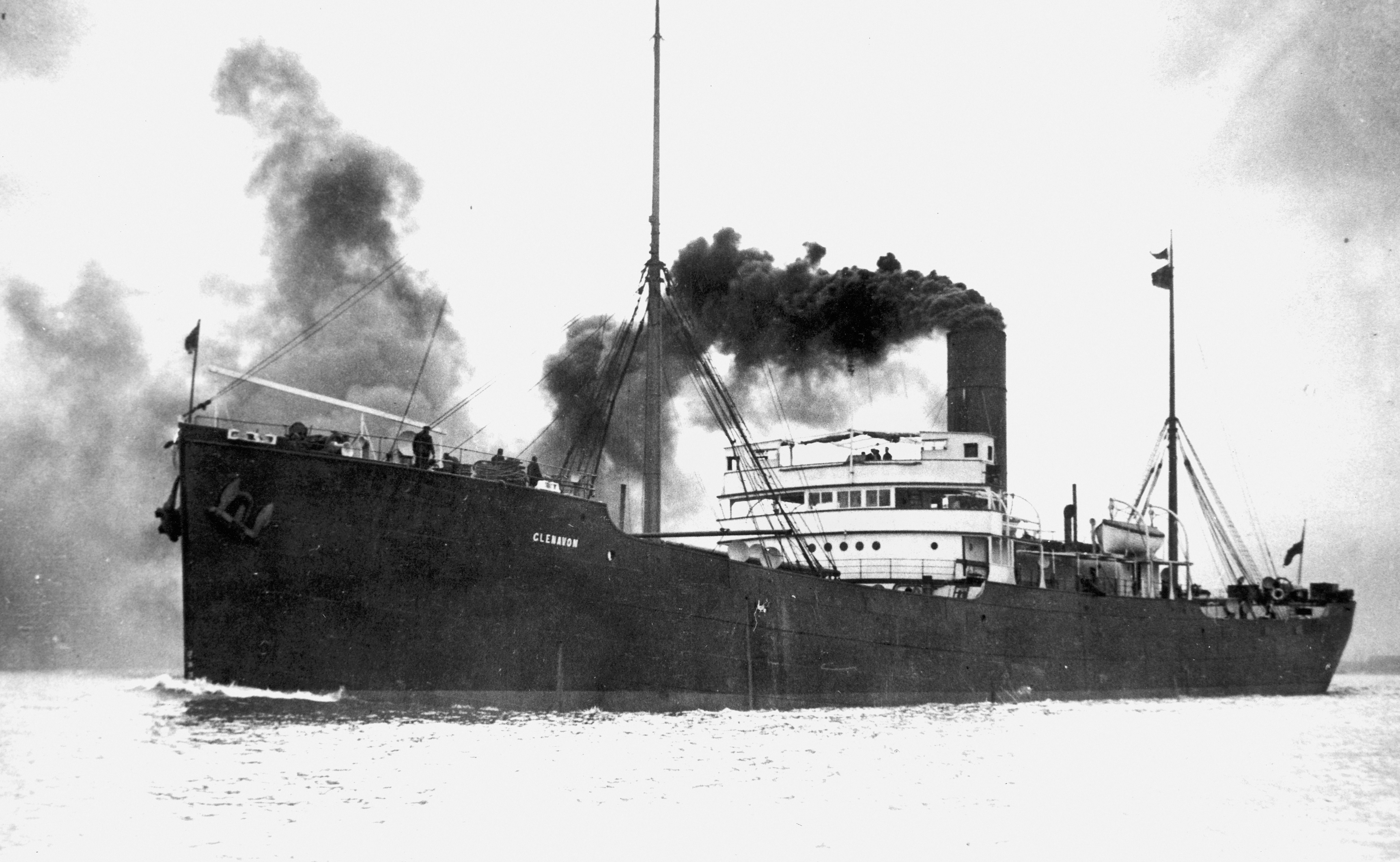
UB-105 sank Ellerman Lines' 4,262 GRT cargo steamship Branksome Hall off the coast of Cyrenaica in July 1918. She is shown here between 1906 and 1911, when she was with Glen Line as Glenavon.

Date	Name	Nationality	Tonnage (Note: Merchant ship tonnages are in gross register tons. Military vessels are listed by tons displacement.)	Fate
23 April 1918	Restaurado	Portugal	136	Sunk
24 April 1918	Leonor	Portugal	166	Sunk
25 April 1918	HMS Cowslip	Royal Navy	1,290	Sunk
29 April 1918	City of Pensacola	United States	705	Sunk
29 April 1918	Kut Sang	United Kingdom	4,895	Sunk
30 April 1918	Conway	United Kingdom	4,003	Sunk
3 June 1918	Nora	United Kingdom	3,933	Sunk
5 June 1918	HMS Snaefell	Royal Navy	1,368	Sunk
6 June 1918	Archbank	United Kingdom	3,767	Sunk
6 June 1918	Menzaleh	United Kingdom	1,859	Sunk
9 June 1918	Clan Forbes	United Kingdom	3,946	Sunk
9 June 1918	Pundit	United Kingdom	5,917	Sunk
9 June 1918	Tewfikieh	United Kingdom	2,490	Sunk
14 July 1918	Branksome Hall	United Kingdom	4,262	Sunk
14 July 1918	Waitemata	United Kingdom	5,432	Sunk
14 July 1918	Djemnah	France	3,716	Sunk
19 July 1918	Eguskia	Spain	1,181	Sunk
18 September 1918	Antonietta	Kingdom of Italy	93	Sunk
20 September 1918	Angelina Pasquale	Kingdom of Italy	29	Sunk
20 September 1918	San Michele	Kingdom of Italy	24	Sunk
21 September 1918	Santo Fortunato	Kingdom of Italy	24	Sunk
3 October 1918	Ariel	United Kingdom	3,428	Sunk
3 October 1918	Saint Luc	France	2,456	Sunk
7 October 1918	Madeira	Portugal	4,792	Sunk
7 October 1918	Saint Barnabe	France	5,184	Sunk
12 October 1918	Tripoli II	Kingdom of Italy	958	Sunk

== Bibliography ==
- Gröner, Erich; Jung, Dieter; Maass, Martin (1991). U-boats and Mine Warfare Vessels. German Warships 1815–1945. Vol. 2. Translated by Thomas, Keith; Magowan, Rachel. London: Conway Maritime Press. ISBN 0-85177-593-4.
- Bendert, Harald (2000). Die UB-Boote der Kaiserlichen Marine, 1914-1918. Einsätze, Erfolge, Schicksal (in German). Hamburg: Verlag E.S. Mittler & Sohn GmbH. ISBN 3-8132-0713-7.
- Rössler, Eberhard (1979). Die deutschen U-Boote und ihre Werften: eine Bilddokumentation über den deutschen U-Bootbau; in zwei Bänden (in German). Vol. I. Munich: Bernard & Graefe. ISBN 3-7637-5213-7.
