= SM UB-68 =

Ship in the German Imperial Navy

History

German Empire
- Name: UB-68
- Ordered: 20 May 1916
- Builder: Friedrich Krupp Germaniawerft, Kiel
- Cost: 3,276,000 German Papiermark
- Yard number: 286
- Launched: 4 July 1917
- Commissioned: 5 October 1917
- Fate: Sunk 4 October 1918

General characteristics
- Class & type: Type UB III submarine
- Displacement: 513 t (505 long tons) surfaced; 647 t (637 long tons) submerged
- Length: 55.83 m (183 ft 2 in) (o/a)
- Beam: 5.80 m (19 ft)
- Draught: 3.67 m (12 ft 0 in)
- Propulsion: 2 × propeller shaft; 2 × MAN four-stroke 6-cylinder diesel engines, 1,085 bhp (809 kW); 2 × Siemens-Schuckert electric motors, 780 shp (580 kW)
- Speed: 13.2 knots (24.4 km/h; 15.2 mph) surfaced; 7.6 knots (14.1 km/h; 8.7 mph) submerged
- Range: 9,090 nmi (16,830 km; 10,460 mi) at 6 knots (11 km/h; 6.9 mph) surfaced; 55 nmi (102 km; 63 mi) at 4 knots (7.4 km/h; 4.6 mph) submerged
- Test depth: 50 m (160 ft)
- Complement: 3 officers, 31 men
- Armament: 5 × 50 cm (19.7 in) torpedo tubes (4 bow, 1 stern); 10 torpedoes; 1 × 8.8 cm (3.46 in) deck gun
- Notes: 30-second diving time

Service record
- Part of: Mittelmeer I Flotilla; 8 January – 4 October 1918
- Commanders: Oblt.z.S. / Kptlt. Heino von Heimburg; 5 October 1917 – 1 July 1918; Oblt.z.S. Karl Dönitz; 2 July – 4 October 1918
- Operations: 5 patrols
- Victories: 5 merchant ships sunk (10,709 GRT); 4 merchant ships damaged (23,788 GRT)

SM UB-68 (Note: "SM" stands for "Seiner Majestät" (English: His Majesty's) and combined with the U for Unterseeboot would be translated as His Majesty's Submarine.) was a German Type UB III submarine or U-boat in the German Imperial Navy (German: Kaiserliche Marine) during World War I. The U-boat was ordered on 20 May 1916. It was commissioned into the German Imperial Navy on 5 October 1917 as SM UB-68. The submarine conducted five patrols and sank five ships during the war. Under the command of Karl Dönitz, on 4 October 1918 UB-68 encountered technical problems and had to surface where she was sunk by gunfire at 33°56′N 16°20′E. There was one dead and thirty-three survivors. Other sources name the British warships involved in the sinking of UB-68 as HMS Snapdragon and HMS Cradosin, and claim four crew members died in the event.

== Summary of raiding history ==
Date	Name	Nationality	Tonnage (Note: Tonnages are in gross register tons)	Fate
10 April 1918	Warwickshire	United Kingdom	8,012	Damaged
11 April 1918	Kingstonian	United Kingdom	6,564	Damaged
13 April 1918	Provence III	France	3,941	Damaged
26 April 1918	Angelina Di Paola	Italy	228	Sunk
1 June 1918	Angelina	Italy	1,260	Sunk
3 June 1918	Glaucus	United Kingdom	5,295	Sunk
12 June 1918	Monginevro	Italy	5,271	Damaged
24 June 1918	Saint Antoine	France	43	Sunk
4 October 1918	Oopack	United Kingdom	3,883	Sunk

== Bibliography ==
- Gröner, Erich; Jung, Dieter; Maass, Martin (1991). German Warships 1815–1945, U-boats and Mine Warfare Vessels. Vol. 2. Translated by Thomas, Keith; Magowan, Rachel. London: Conway Maritime Press. ISBN 0-85177-593-4.
- Bendert, Harald (2000). Die UB-Boote der Kaiserlichen Marine, 1914–1918. Einsätze, Erfolge, Schicksal (in German). Hamburg: Verlag E.S. Mittler & Sohn GmbH. ISBN 3-8132-0713-7.
- Rössler, Eberhard (1979). Die deutschen U-Boote und ihre Werften: eine Bilddokumentation über den deutschen U-Bootbau; in zwei Bänden (in German). Vol. I. Munich: Bernard & Graefe. ISBN 3-7637-5213-7.
