= HS Koningin Regentes =

Dutch hospital ship sunk in WWI

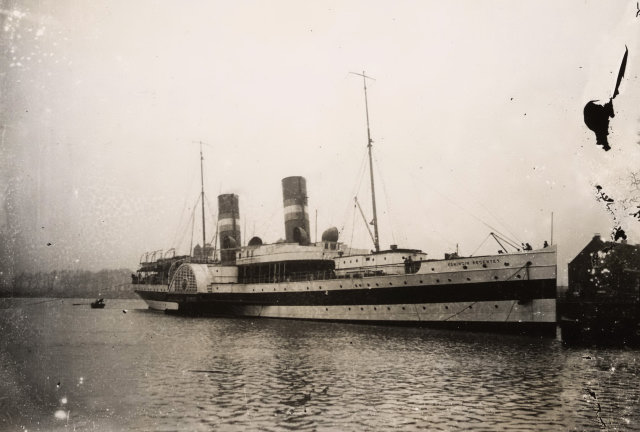
- HS Koningin Regentes during her service as a hospital ship in World War I.

History

Netherlands
- Name: PSS Koningin Regentes (1895–1914); HS Koningin Regentes (1914–1918)
- Namesake: Emma, Queen Regent of the Netherlands
- Owner: Stoomvaart Maatschappij Zeeland
- Port of registry: Netherlands, Vlissingen
- Route: Rotterdam – Boston, Lincolnshire
- Ordered: 1895
- Builder: Fairfield Shipbuilding & Engineering Co. Ltd.
- Yard number: 385
- Laid down: 1895
- Launched: 9 July 1895
- Completed: 1895
- Maiden voyage: 1895
- In service: 1895
- Fate: Torpedoed and sunk, 6 June 1918

General characteristics
- Type: Passenger ship/Hospital ship
- Tonnage: 1,970 GRT
- Length: 97.5 m (319 ft 11 in)
- Beam: 11 m (36 ft 1 in)
- Depth: 4.9 m (16 ft 1 in)
- Propulsion: Triple-expansion steam engine, paddle wheel
- Speed: 20 knots (37 km/h; 23 mph)

HS Koningin Regentes (Dutch pronunciation: [ˌkoːnɪˈŋɪn reːɣɛnˈtɛs]; "Queen Regent") was a Dutch hospital ship that was torpedoed by the Imperial German Navy submarine SM UB-107 on 6 June 1918 while returning to Rotterdam, the Netherlands, from Boston, Lincolnshire, England.

== Construction ==
HS Koningin Regentes was built as the paddle steamer PSS Koningin Regentes at the Fairfield Shipbuilding & Engineering Co. Ltd. shipyard in Govan, Scotland, in 1895. She was launched on 9 July 1895, and completed later that year. The ship was 97.5 metres (319 ft 11 in) long, had a beam of 11 metres (36 ft 1 in), and had a depth of 4.9 metres (16 ft 1 in). She was assessed at 1,970 gross register tons (GRT) and had triple-expansion engines driving her paddle wheel. The engine was rated at 1,305 nhp and the ship could reach a maximum speed of 20 knots (37 km/h; 23 mph).

== Early career ==
The Koningin Regentes was used as a ferry boat between the Netherlands and the United Kingdom until the outbreak of World War I. She sometimes also carried mail as cargo.

== World War I ==
After World War I began, Koningin Regentes was refitted with special accommodations and repainted for service as a hospital ship. Her name was therefore also changed to HS Koningin Regentes. The Koningin Regentes now served on a new route between Rotterdam, the Netherlands, and Boston, Lincolnshire, England, and operated on this route for nearly the entire war.

=== Sinking ===
On 6 June 1918 Koningin Regentes departed Boston bound for Rotterdam. When she was 21 miles (34 km) east of Leman lightship, she was torpedoed by the Imperial German Navy submarine SM UB-107 and sank shortly afterwards. Seven people lost their lives in the sinking and the survivors were saved soon after.

== Wreck ==
The wreck of Koningin Regentes lies at a depth of 30 metres (98 ft 5 in) and is broken in several pieces. It lies close to an English drilling site, and the sea floor is level with only sand and shells; visibility is also very good. One of the ship′s steam engines lies on top of the ship and her decks have collapsed and are under a lot of sand.
