= Markotkh Range =

Mountain range in Krasnodar Krai, Russia

Coordinates: 44°37′32″N 38°03′39″E

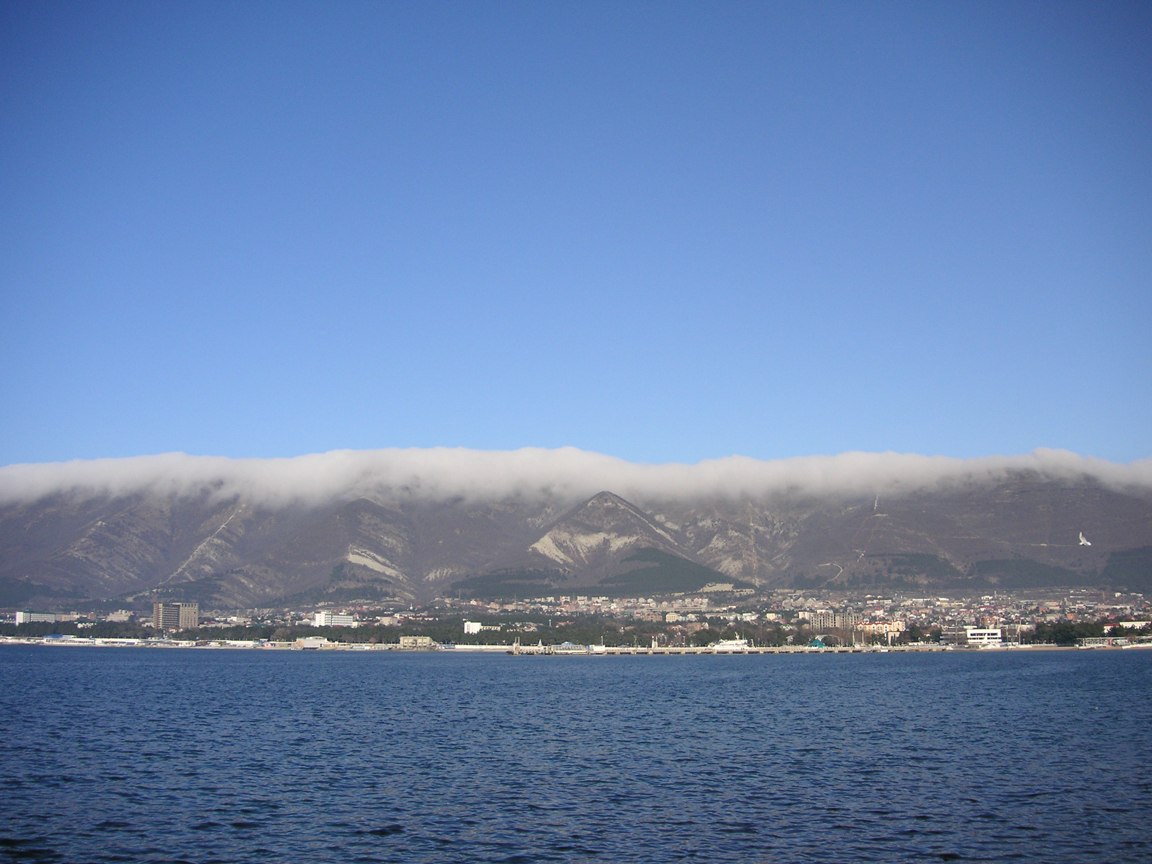
View of the Markotkh from the Gelendzhik Bay.

The Markotkh is a low 90 km-long mountain range in the extreme northwest of the Greater Caucasus that, running parallel to the Black Sea coastline, encircles the Tsemes Bay and the Gelendzhik Bay.

Its Markotkh name translates from the Adyghe language as "blackberry". The highest point is Mount Ploskaya which has an elevation of 762 metres (2,500 ft). The main Caucasus Range lies immediately to the north.
