= SM UB-107 =

History

German Empire
- Name: UB-107
- Ordered: 23 September 1916; 6 / 8 February 1917
- Builder: Blohm & Voss, Hamburg
- Cost: 3,714,000 German Papiermark
- Yard number: 313
- Launched: 21 July 1917
- Commissioned: 16 February 1918
- Fate: Sunk 27 July 1918

General characteristics
- Class & type: Type UB III submarine
- Displacement: 519 t (511 long tons) surfaced; 649 t (639 long tons) submerged
- Length: 55.30 m (181 ft 5 in) (o/a)
- Beam: 5.80 m (19 ft)
- Draught: 3.70 m (12 ft 2 in)
- Propulsion: 2 × propeller shaft; 2 × MAN-Vulcan four-stroke 6-cylinder diesel engines, 1,085 bhp (809 kW); 2 × Siemens-Schuckert electric motors, 780 shp (580 kW)
- Speed: 13.3 knots (24.6 km/h; 15.3 mph) surfaced; 7.5 knots (13.9 km/h; 8.6 mph) submerged
- Range: 7,420 nmi (13,740 km; 8,540 mi) at 6 knots (11 km/h; 6.9 mph) surfaced; 55 nmi (102 km; 63 mi) at 4 knots (7.4 km/h; 4.6 mph) submerged
- Test depth: 50 m (160 ft)
- Complement: 3 officers, 31 men
- Armament: 5 × 50 cm (19.7 in) torpedo tubes (4 bow, 1 stern); 10 torpedoes; 1 × 8.8 cm (3.46 in) deck gun

Service record
- Part of: Flandern II Flotilla; 16 May – 4 August 1918
- Commanders: Kptlt. Hans Howaldt; 16 February – 16 May 1918; Kptlt. Eberhard von Prittwitz und Gaffron; 17 May – 4 August 1918
- Operations: 4 patrols
- Victories: 11 merchant ships sunk (26,147 GRT); 1 merchant ship damaged (1,685 GRT)

SM UB-107 was a German Type UB III submarine or U-boat in the German Imperial Navy (German: Kaiserliche Marine) during World War I. She was commissioned into the German Imperial Navy on 16 February 1918 as SM UB-107. (Note: "SM" stands for "Seiner Majestät" (English: His Majesty's) and combined with the U for Unterseeboot would be translated as His Majesty's Submarine.)

The submarine conducted 4 patrols and sank 11 ships during the war for a total loss of 26,147 GRT. UB-107 was sunk on 27 July 1918 by HMS Vanessa and HMT Calvis at 54°23′N 0°24′W.

== Construction ==
UB-107 was ordered by the GIN on 23 September 1916. She was built by Blohm & Voss of Hamburg and following just under a year of construction, launched at Hamburg on 21 July 1917. UB-107 was commissioned early the next year. Like all Type UB III submarines, UB-107 carried 10 torpedoes and was armed with a 8.8 cm (3.46 in) deck gun. UB-107 would carry a crew of up to 3 officer and 31 men and had a cruising range of 7,420 nautical miles (13,740 km; 8,540 mi). UB-107 had a displacement of 519 t (511 long tons) while surfaced and 649 t (639 long tons) when submerged. Her engines enabled her to travel at 13.3 knots (24.6 km/h; 15.3 mph) when surfaced and 7.4 knots (13.7 km/h; 8.5 mph) when submerged.

== Fate ==
The first recorded fate of UB-107 was noted as sunk by depth charge on 27 July 1918 by the Royal Navy trawler Calvia and destroyer Vanessa at position 54°23′N 00°24′E. It has since been argued that the UB-107 was probably not present for the attack by Calvis and Vanessa as it was the only U-boat that could have been responsible for the sinking of steamers Chloris and John Rettig two and a half hours later at position 53°52′N 00°10′E.

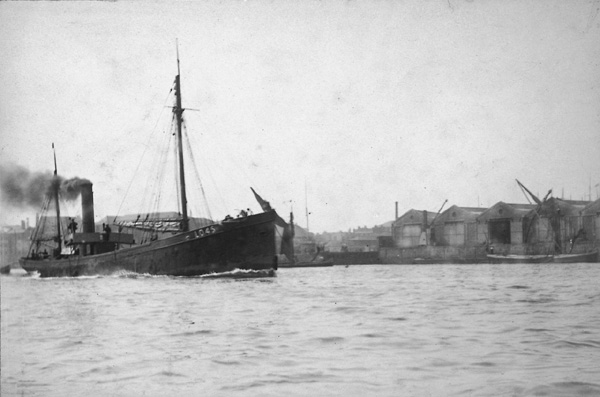
SS Malvina on the River Thames

In 1985 divers discovered the wreck of UB-107 one mile north of Flamborough Head at position 54°08′N 00°00′W entangled with another wreck, the SS Malvina, a British steamer torpedoed and sunk on 3 August 1918 reported as being by UB-104, though UB-104's record says it was not in the area nor that it attacked a ship on that day. UB-107 was identified by the markings on her propellers. It is suggested that either UB-107 suffered an accident of some sort or was lost on a British mine between 28 July and 3 August 1918, leaving all hands lost (38 dead).

== Summary of raiding history ==
Date	Name	Nationality	Tonnage (Note: Tonnages are in gross register tons)	Fate
10 May 1918	Erich Lea	Norway	1,630	Sunk
10 May 1918	Naparima	Sweden	1,685	Damaged
6 June 1918	Koningin Regentes	Netherlands	1,970	Sunk
8 June 1918	Hogarth	United Kingdom	1,231	Sunk
13 June 1918	Agnes	Sweden	1,334	Sunk
13 June 1918	Kalo	United Kingdom	1,957	Sunk
15 June 1918	Kieldrecht	United Kingdom	1,284	Sunk
8 July 1918	Chicago	United Kingdom	7,709	Sunk
8 July 1918	War Crocus	United Kingdom	5,296	Sunk
9 July 1918	Fryken	Sweden	943	Sunk
27 July 1918	Chloris	United Kingdom	984	Sunk
27 July 1918	John Rettig	Sweden	1,809	Sunk

== Television Documentary ==
The fate of UB-107 was the subject of an episode of the documentary television series Deep Sea Detectives: "Mystery U-Boat of WWI". The documentary offered various scenarios for the sinking based on historical evidence and exploratory diving at the wreck site.

== Bibliography ==
- Bendert, Harald (2000). Die UB-Boote der Kaiserlichen Marine, 1914-1918. Einsätze, Erfolge, Schicksal (in German). Hamburg: Verlag E.S. Mittler & Sohn GmbH. ISBN 3-8132-0713-7.
- Gröner, Erich; Jung, Dieter; Maass, Martin (1991). U-boats and Mine Warfare Vessels. German Warships 1815–1945. Vol. 2. Translated by Thomas, Keith; Magowan, Rachel. London: Conway Maritime Press. ISBN 0-85177-593-4.
- Kemp, Paul (1997). U-Boats Destroyed, German submarine losses in the World Wars. Arms and Armour. ISBN 1-85409-515-3.
- Rössler, Eberhard (1979). Die deutschen U-Boote und ihre Werften: eine Bilddokumentation über den deutschen U-Bootbau; in zwei Bänden (in German). Vol. I. Munich: Bernard & Graefe. ISBN 3-7637-5213-7.
