= SM UB-88 =

German U-Boat of World War I

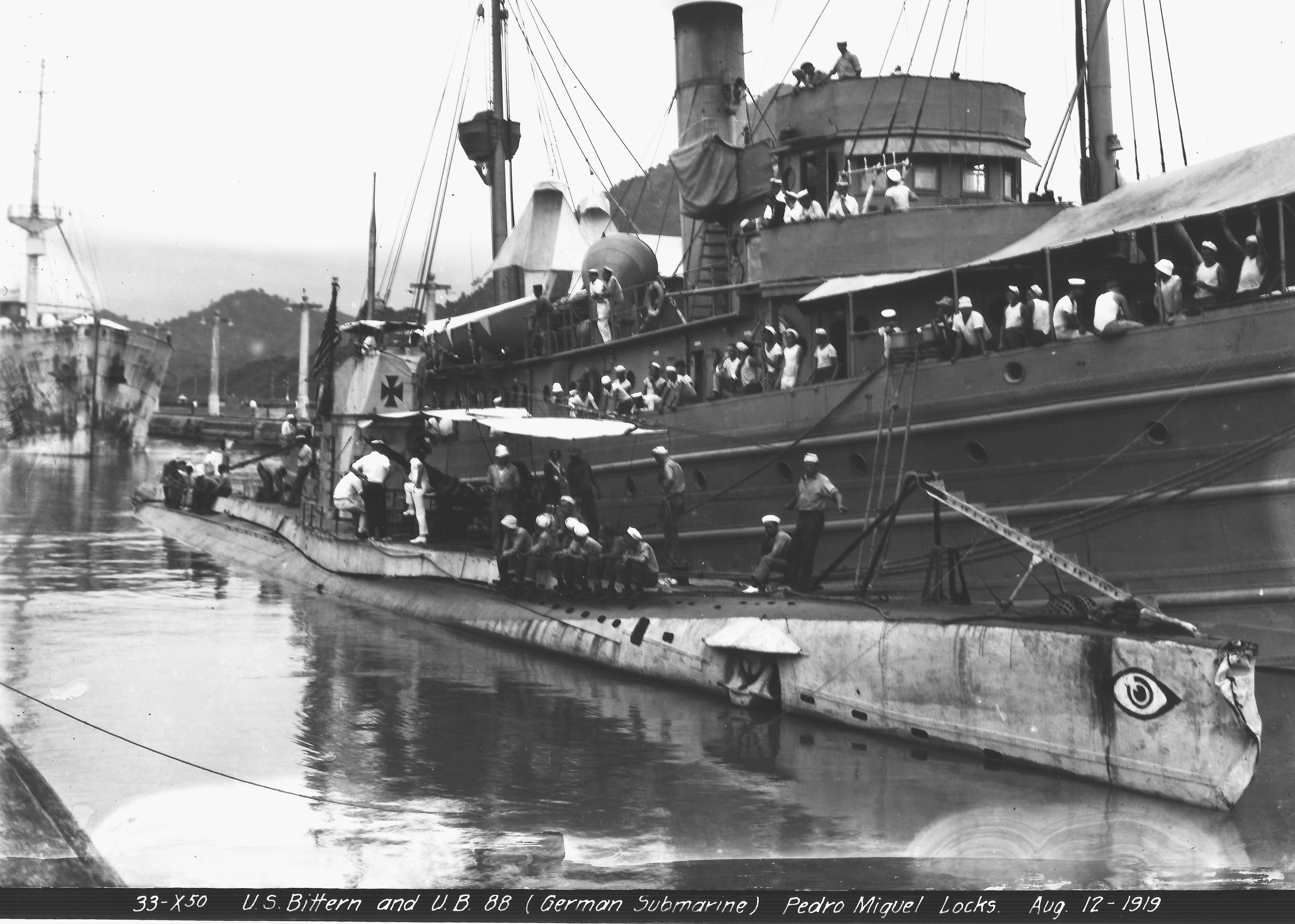
- UB-88 alongside USS Bittern at Pedro Miguel Panama Canal, August 1919

History

German Empire
- Name: UB-88
- Ordered: 6 / 8 February 1917
- Builder: AG Vulcan, Hamburg
- Cost: 3,654,000 German Papiermark
- Yard number: 104
- Laid down: February 1917
- Launched: 11 December 1917
- Commissioned: 26 January 1918
- Fate: Surrendered 26 November 1918, sunk as target 3 January 1921 at 33.5984°N 118.2448°W

General characteristics
- Class & type: Type UB III submarine
- Displacement: 510 t (500 long tons) surfaced; 640 t (630 long tons) submerged
- Length: 55.52 m (182 ft 2 in) (o/a)
- Beam: 5.76 m (18 ft 11 in)
- Draught: 3.73 m (12 ft 3 in)
- Propulsion: 2 × propeller shaft; 2 × MAN-Vulcan four-stroke 6-cylinder diesel engines, 1,085 bhp (809 kW); 2 × Siemens-Schuckert electric motors, 780 shp (580 kW)
- Speed: 13 knots (24 km/h; 15 mph) surfaced; 7.4 knots (13.7 km/h; 8.5 mph) submerged
- Range: 7,120 nmi (13,190 km; 8,190 mi) at 6 knots (11 km/h; 6.9 mph) surfaced; 55 nmi (102 km; 63 mi) at 4 knots (7.4 km/h; 4.6 mph) submerged
- Test depth: 50 m (160 ft)
- Complement: 3 officers, 31 men
- Armament: 5 × 50 cm (19.7 in) torpedo tubes (4 bow, 1 stern); 10 torpedoes; 1 × 10.5 cm (4.13 in) deck gun

Service record
- Part of: Flandern I Flotilla; 12 June – 4 October 1918; II Flotilla; 4 October – 11 November 1918
- Commanders: Oblt.z.S. Johannes Ries; 26 January – 15 February 1918; Kptlt. Reinhard von Rabenau; 16 February – 11 November 1918
- Operations: 5 patrols
- Victories: 14 merchant ships sunk (31,076 GRT); 2 merchant ships damaged (10,135 GRT)

SM UB-88 was a German Type UB III submarine or U-boat in the German Imperial Navy (German: Kaiserliche Marine) during World War I. She was commissioned into the German Imperial Navy on 26 January 1918 as SM UB-88. (Note: "SM" stands for "Seiner Majestät" (English: His Majesty's) and combined with the U for Unterseeboot would be translated as His Majesty's Submarine.)

== Construction ==
She was built by AG Vulcan of Hamburg and following just under a year of construction, launched at Hamburg on 11 December 1917. UB-88 was commissioned early the next year under the command of Oblt.z.S. Johannes Ries. Like all Type UB III submarines, UB-88 carried 10 torpedoes and was armed with a 10.5 cm (4.13 in) deck gun. UB-88 would carry a crew of up to 3 officers and 31 men and had a cruising range of 7,120 nautical miles (13,190 km; 8,190 mi). UB-88 had a displacement of 510 t (500 long tons) while surfaced and 640 t (630 long tons) when submerged. Her engines enabled her to travel at 13 knots (24 km/h; 15 mph) when surfaced and 7.4 knots (13.7 km/h; 8.5 mph) when submerged.

== Service history ==
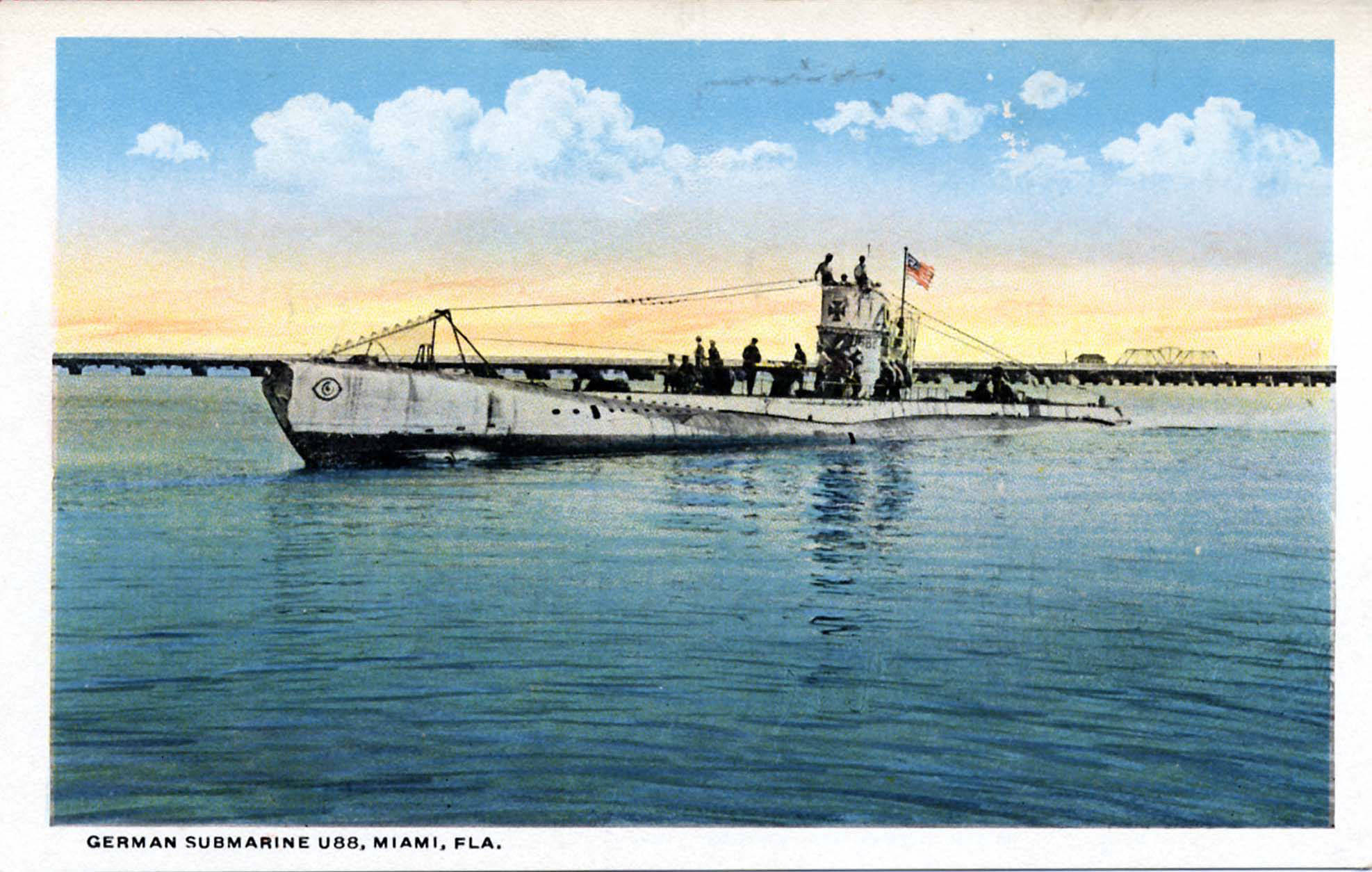
SM UB-88 in Miami, Florida (c. 1919)

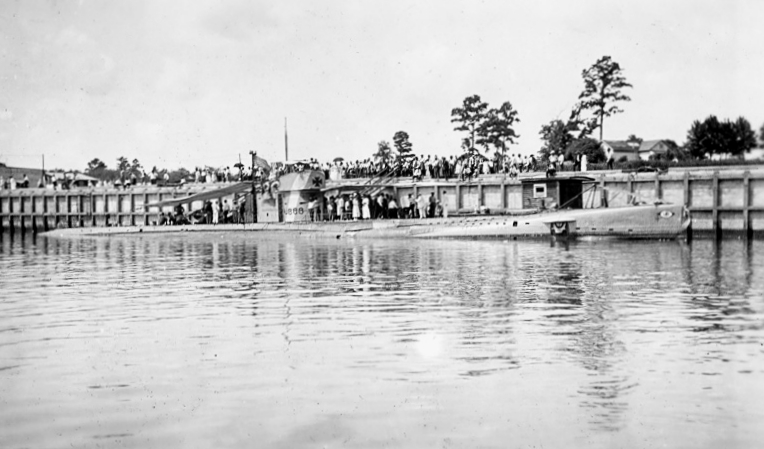
SM UB-88 in the U.S. c. 1920

UB-88 was surrendered to the United States on 26 November 1918 in accordance with the requirements of the Armistice with Germany. She was refurbished and did an exhibition tour in 1919 from New York, down the East Coast, and up the Mississippi River before passing through the Panama Canal and touring the West Coast as far north as Seattle, Washington.

After having all useful parts and salvage stripped from her, she was sunk as a target on 3 January 1921 in waters off Los Angeles County, California. The propellers were saved and placed on display in the city of San Pedro but were stolen in 1923 by metal thieves and were never recovered.

The wreck of the vessel was found in July 2003 using publicly available sonar data from the Pacific Seafloor Mapping project. She sits upright approximately 7.5 miles (12 km) south of the entrance to the Port of Los Angeles at a depth of 190 feet (58 m). The outer hull has corroded revealing the inner pressure hull. Divers have entered the wreck and found the interior to be almost completely bare. As she was given a special commission to the United States Navy, she is protected by the Sunken Military Craft Act.

== Summary of raiding history ==
Date	Name	Nationality	Tonnage (Note: Tonnages are in gross register tons)	Fate
10 June 1918	Princess Maud	United Kingdom	1,566	Sunk
10 June 1918	Dora	Sweden	1,555	Sunk
22 June 1918	Avance	Sweden	1,585	Sunk
23 June 1918	London	United Kingdom	1,706	Sunk
25 June 1918	African Transport	United Kingdom	4,482	Sunk
25 June 1918	Moorlands	United Kingdom	3,602	Sunk
29 June 1918	Herdis	United Kingdom	1,157	Sunk
29 June 1918	Sixty-six	United Kingdom	214	Sunk
30 July 1918	Bayronto	United Kingdom	6,045	Damaged
3 August 1918	Berwind	United States	2,589	Sunk
3 August 1918	Lake Portage	United States	1,998	Sunk
4 August 1918	Hundvaagø	Norway	1,901	Sunk
9 August 1918	Anselma De Larrinaga	United Kingdom	4,090	Damaged
16 September 1918	Philomel	United Kingdom	3,050	Sunk
19 September 1918	Fanny	Sweden	1,450	Sunk
22 September 1918	Polesley	United Kingdom	4,221	Sunk

== Bibliography ==
- Bendert, Harald (2000). Die UB-Boote der Kaiserlichen Marine, 1914-1918. Einsätze, Erfolge, Schicksal (in German). Hamburg: Verlag E.S. Mittler & Sohn GmbH. ISBN 3-8132-0713-7.
- Gröner, Erich; Jung, Dieter; Maass, Martin (1991). German Warships 1815–1945, U-boats and Mine Warfare Vessels. Vol. 2. Translated by Thomas, Keith; Magowan, Rachel. London: Conway Maritime Press. ISBN 0-85177-593-4.
- Rössler, Eberhard (1979). Die deutschen U-Boote und ihre Werften: eine Bilddokumentation über den deutschen U-Bootbau; in zwei Bänden (in German). Vol. I. Munich: Bernard & Graefe. ISBN 3-7637-5213-7.
- Wright, Christopher C. (1986). "The Last Strange Cruise of UB-88". Warship International. XXIII (3): 287–302. ISSN 0043-0374.
