= Gelendzhik Bay =

Bay in the Black Sea near Russia

Coordinates: 44°34′06″N 38°02′58″E

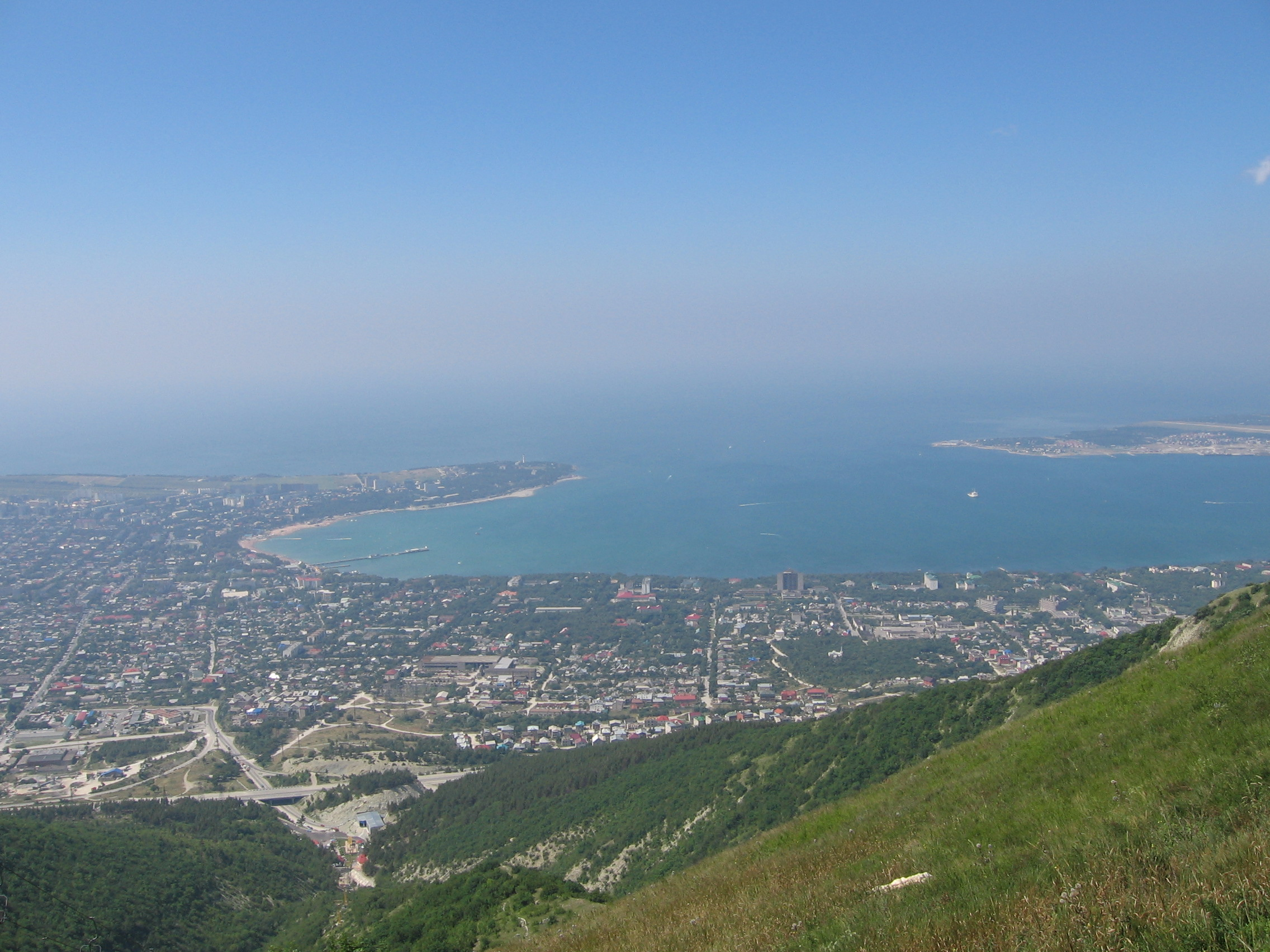
The bay as seen from the local aerial tramway.

The Gelendzhik Bay (Russian: Геленджикская бухта) is an ice-free bay located on the Russian coast of the Black Sea, immediately to the southeast of the Tsemes Bay. The entire 12-km coastline between the capes Tonkiy and Tolstyi falls within the boundaries of Gelendzhik. Beaches take up about two thirds of shoreline. Further inland rise the low Markotkh mountains. The maximum depth of the sea is 11 meters.
