= SM UC-59 =

1916 German Type UC II minelaying U-boat

History

German Empire
- Name: UC-59
- Ordered: 12 January 1916
- Builder: Kaiserliche Werft, Danzig
- Yard number: 41
- Laid down: 25 March 1916
- Launched: 28 September 1916
- Commissioned: 12 May 1917
- Fate: Surrendered, 21 November 1918; broken up, 1919 – 20

General characteristics
- Class & type: Type UC II submarine
- Displacement: 415 t (408 long tons), surfaced; 498 t (490 long tons), submerged
- Length: 52.69 m (172 ft 10 in) o/a; 40.96 m (134 ft 5 in) pressure hull
- Beam: 5.22 m (17 ft 2 in) o/a; 3.65 m (12 ft) pressure hull
- Draught: 3.61 m (11 ft 10 in)
- Propulsion: 2 × propeller shafts; 2 × 6-cylinder, 4-stroke diesel engines, 580–600 PS (430–440 kW; 570–590 shp); 2 × electric motors, 620 PS (460 kW; 610 shp)
- Speed: 11.6 knots (21.5 km/h; 13.3 mph), surfaced; 7.3 knots (13.5 km/h; 8.4 mph), submerged
- Range: 8,660–9,450 nmi (16,040–17,500 km; 9,970–10,870 mi) at 7 knots (13 km/h; 8.1 mph) surfaced; 52 nmi (96 km; 60 mi) at 4 knots (7.4 km/h; 4.6 mph) submerged
- Test depth: 50 m (160 ft)
- Complement: 26
- Armament: 6 × 100 cm (39.4 in) mine tubes; 18 × UC 200 mines; 3 × 50 cm (19.7 in) torpedo tubes (2 bow/external; one stern); 7 × torpedoes; 1 × 8.8 cm (3.5 in) Uk L/30 deck gun
- Notes: 30-second diving time

Service record
- Part of: Baltic Flotilla; 21 July – 11 December 1917; I Flotilla; 11 December 1917 – 11 November 1918
- Commanders: Kptlt. Herbert Lefholz; 12 May 1917 – 26 April 1918; Oblt.z.S. Walter Strasser; 27 April – 11 November 1918
- Operations: 9 patrols
- Victories: 7 merchant ships sunk (4,791 GRT); 1 auxiliary warship sunk (330 GRT); 1 merchant ship taken as prize (1,277 GRT)

SM UC-59 was a German Type UC II minelaying submarine or U-boat in the German Imperial Navy (German: Kaiserliche Marine) during World War I. The U-boat was ordered on 12 January 1916, laid down on 25 March 1916, and was launched on 28 September 1916. She was commissioned into the German Imperial Navy on 12 May 1917 as SM UC-59. (Note: "SM" stands for "Seiner Majestät" (English: His Majesty's) and combined with the U for Unterseeboot would be translated as His Majesty's Submarine.) In nine patrols UC-59 was credited with sinking eight ships, either by torpedo or by mines laid. UC-59 was surrendered on 21 November 1918 and broken up at Bo'ness in 1919 – 20.

== Design ==
A Type UC II submarine, UC-59 had a displacement of 415 tonnes (408 long tons) when at the surface and 498 tonnes (490 long tons) while submerged. She had a length overall of 50.52 m (165 ft 9 in), a beam of 5.22 m (17 ft 2 in), and a draught of 3.61 m (11 ft 10 in). The submarine was powered by two six-cylinder four-stroke diesel engines each producing 290–300 metric horsepower (210–220 kW; 290–300 shp) (a total of 580–600 metric horsepower (430–440 kW; 570–590 shp)), two electric motors producing 620 metric horsepower (460 kW; 610 shp), and two propeller shafts. She had a dive time of 48 seconds and was capable of operating at a depth of 50 metres (160 ft).

The submarine had a maximum surface speed of 11.6 knots (21.5 km/h; 13.3 mph) and a submerged speed of 7.3 knots (13.5 km/h; 8.4 mph). When submerged, she could operate for 52 nautical miles (96 km; 60 mi) at 4 knots (7.4 km/h; 4.6 mph); when surfaced, she could travel 8,660 to 9,450 nautical miles (16,040 to 17,500 km; 9,970 to 10,870 mi) at 7 knots (13 km/h; 8.1 mph). UC-59 was fitted with six 100 centimetres (39 in) mine tubes, eighteen UC 200 mines, three 50 centimetres (20 in) torpedo tubes (one on the stern and two on the bow), seven torpedoes, and one 8.8 cm (3.5 in) Uk L/30 deck gun. Her complement was twenty-six crew members.

== Summary of raiding history ==
Date	Name	Nationality	Tonnage (Note: Merchant ship tonnages are in gross register tons. Military vessels are listed by tons displacement.)	Fate
20 August 1917	Ilja Muromets	Imperial Russian Navy	330	Sunk
23 February 1918	Remus	United Kingdom	1,079	Sunk
28 June 1918	Elbjorg	Norway	523	Sunk
29 June 1918	Drowning Thyra	Denmark	430	Sunk
29 June 1918	Ariadne	Norway	496	Sunk
12 July 1918	Margrete	Denmark	1,277	Captured as prize
21 August 1918	Hecla	Norway	860	Sunk
21 August 1918	Loeke	Norway	319	Sunk
24 August 1918	Auckland Castle	United Kingdom	1,084	Sunk
