= SS Carolina =

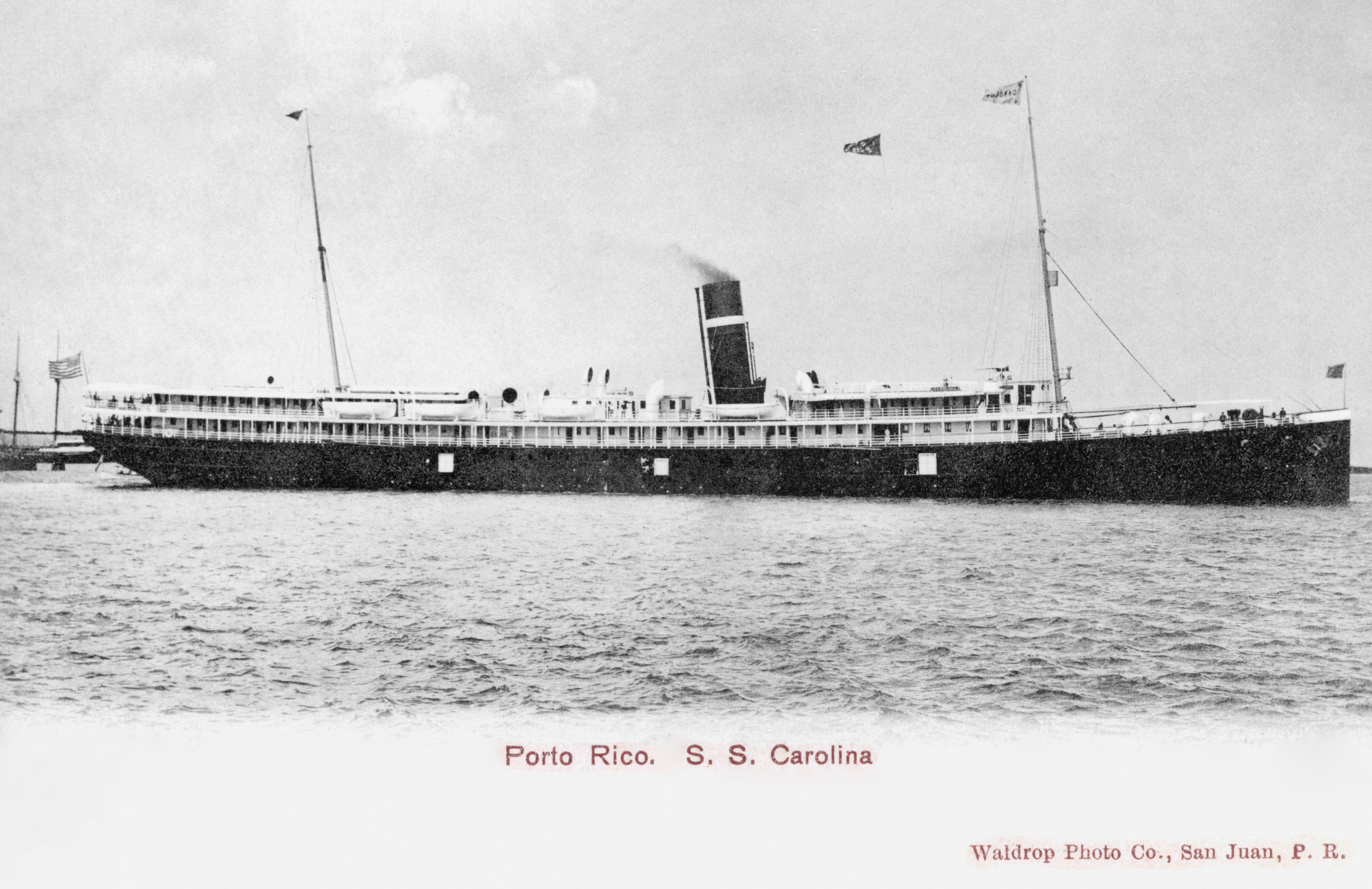
- SS Carolina

History
- Name: Carolina
- Owner: Plant Investment Co.
- Builder: The Newport News Shipbuilding and Drydock Company
- Cost: US$500,000
- Yard number: 15
- Christened: 30 January 1896 as La Grande Duchesse
- Acquired: 9 April 1899
- Maiden voyage: 7 September 1907
- In service: 1896
- Out of service: 1918
- Fate: Sunk by gunfire on 2 June 1918.

General characteristics
- Tonnage: 5017
- Length: 380 ft (120 m)
- Beam: 47 ft (14 m)
- Draft: 33 ft (10 m)

SS Carolina was a 380-foot-long (120 m) passenger liner; it was one of six vessels sunk on a single day during World War I by the German submarine U-151 on "Black Sunday". The wreck was rediscovered in 1995 by wreck divers.

== History ==
The Plant Investment Co. originally contracted for the building of the vessel in 1895 with the Newport News Shipbuilding and Dry Dock Company. The original contract was for $500,000, but the vessel ended up being delivered three years late and costing $536,000 over budget, and represented the greatest loss (in percentage terms) of any ship built by The Newport News Shipbuilding and Dry Dock Company. After such an inauspicious start, things scarcely improved for the vessel. She was christened on 30 January 1896 as La Grande Duchesse, and following her sea trials was delivered to The Plant Investment Co in November 1896. She was refused because of boiler and propeller problems, after which she was subjected to a refit, but was refused again in September 1897, and further modifications were made. She successfully completed further sea trials in June 1898. She was finally accepted by The Plant Investment Co. on 9 April 1899 and the US government chartered her for a transport in the Spanish–American War.

In November 1901 she was passed to the Ocean Steamship Co. (and renamed City of Savannah), for whom she ran a service between New York City and Charleston, South Carolina. She was then sold to the New York & Porto Rico Line in January 1906, and renamed Carolina. Throughout her working life, she had continual problems with her machinery. She seemed to suffer from vibration problems, and the twin-screw design of the stern causing steering and handling problems. She was further damaged by a fire on 21 November 1907 while in drydock.

In 1913, she had a considerable refit which resolved many of her mechanical problems. Ironically, the work was done by her original building yard, Newport News Shipbuilding and Dry Dock Co. However, less than two months later she collided with the liner Cleveland in New York harbor.

== Sinking ==
Carolina left San Juan, Puerto Rico on 29 May 1918, with 218 passengers, 117 crew members and a cargo of sugar, bound for New York. At 5:55 pm on 2 June, she received a radio SOS from the US schooner Isabel B Wiley saying that she was being attacked by a submarine. Carolina's master, Captain Barber, ordered full speed and steered away from the reported location. Shortly afterwards, a surfaced submarine was sighted, the German U-151, which fired three warning shells from her deck guns and hoisted the flag signal for "abandon ship". The captain ordered the ship's lifeboats to be filled, women and children first and lowered at 6:30. When all the boats were away, U-151 fired three further shells into the ship's port side and stood to while the vessel listed and finally sank at 7:55.

Most of the ship's boats stayed together and survived a squall during the night. They were picked up by the schooner Eva B Douglas at 11am the following day. One lifeboat made it to the coast at Atlantic City and another was picked by the British steamship Appleby. At 4pm, the Danish steamship Bryssel found the swamped motor dory from Carolina; the eight male passengers and five crew on the boat had drowned. It was the first loss of life caused by U-boat activity on the US Atlantic seaboard. Carolina was one of six vessels sunk by U-151 on 2 June 1918, which caused that day to be known as "Black Sunday".

== Rediscovery ==
The wreck was rediscovered by divers John Chatterton and John Yurga. Chatterton lodged a salvage claim in the New Jersey Federal district court, arresting the ship. The salvage case was heard by Federal District Court Judge Joseph Rodriguez, whose father had been a passenger on Carolina. However, Chatterton subsequently wrote an open letter to the diving community saying they were free to take items off the ship, he was simply protecting his position from insurance companies.

In the event, Chatteron would eventually salvage the purser's safe from Carolina with renowned wreck diver Gary Gentile, which was found to contain gold coin and jewelry. After relations between the two men broke down, Gentile would later write in his book, Shadow Divers Exposed, that despite the assistance he lent to Chatterton, Chatteron only gave him a token share of the salvage claim.

== Sources ==
- Videotaped Interview with Judge Joseph Rodriguez
- "Black Sunday" - Victims of U-151
- 2000 SS Carolina Seeker expedition
- 2007 SS Carolina trip report
