= Tsemes Bay =

Bay in Krasnodar Krai, Russia

Coordinates: 44.6833°N 37.8333°E

- Interactive map of Tsemes Bay

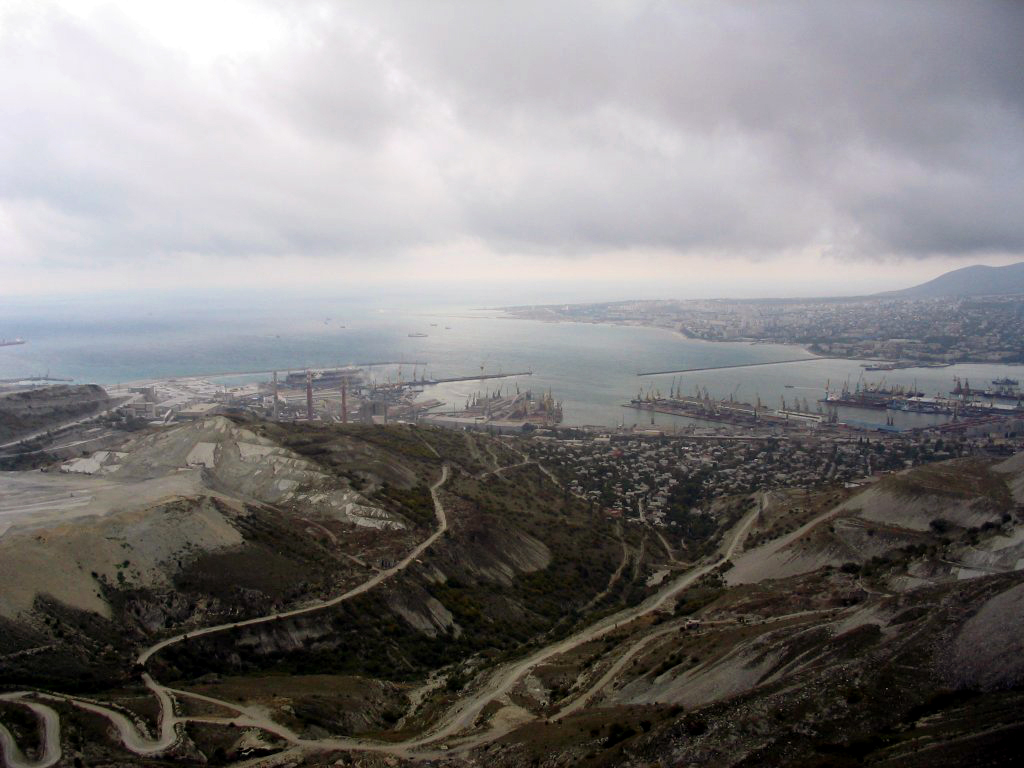
A panoramic view of the Tsemes Bay from the Markotkh Range.

The Tsemes Bay (also Tsemess Bay and Novorossiysk Bay; Russian: Цемесская бухта, Tsemesskaya bukhta) is an ice-free bay located on the north-eastern coast of the Black Sea, in Krasnodar Krai of Russia. It takes its name from the Tsemes River which flows into the bay. The depth of the sea varies from 21 to 27 meters. The length of the bay is 15 kilometers; its maximum width is 9 kilometers. It is delimited by the Sudzhuk Spit and by Cape Doob.

Although navigation is affected by strong autumn and winter bora winds (up to 220 kilometers per hour), ancient Greek navigators frequented the bay and established the colony of Bata on the shore. Michael Rostovtzeff explained this by the lack of any other decent harbours along the coastline between the bay and Batumi to the south. During the Middle Ages the Ghisolfi merchant family of Genoa controlled the coast.

Novorossiysk, founded by Russians in 1838 as a military facility, is the chief port on the bay. In June 1918 Soviet Navy crews scuttled several ships of the Black Sea Fleet in the bay to avoid their transfer to the Germans. Several notable shipwrecks occurred in Tsemes bay, including that of SS Admiral Nakhimov in 1986. Following the 1992 establishment of the Caspian Pipeline Consortium, the Commercial Seaport of Novorossiysk has emerged as the busiest oil terminal in the Black Sea. The southern portion of the bay, with the minor resort of Kabardinka, is administered from Gelendzhik (see Gelendzhik Bay).
