= List of shipwrecks in July 1918 =

The list of shipwrecks in July 1918 includes ships sunk, foundered, grounded, or otherwise lost during July 1918.

== 1 July ==
List of shipwrecks: 1 July 1918
| Ship | State | Description |
|---|---|---|
| Charing Cross | United Kingdom | World War I: The cargo ship was torpedoed and sunk in the North Sea 4 nautical miles (7.4 km) east by north of Flamborough Head, Yorkshire by SM UB-40 (Imperial German Navy). Her crew survived. |
| USS Covington | United States Navy | USS Covington World War I: Convoy OR 51: The troopship was torpedoed and sunk in the Atlantic Ocean 100 nautical miles (190 km) west of Ouessant, Finistère, France (47°31′N 7°09′W) by SM U-86 (Imperial German Navy) with the loss of six of her crew. |
| SMS M83 | Imperial German Navy | World War I: The Type 1916 minesweeper struck a mine and sank in the North Sea. |
| SMS M92 | Imperial German Navy | World War I: The Type 1916 minesweeper struck a mine and sank in the North Sea. |
| Monte Cristo | France | World War I: The four-masted schooner was torpedoed and sunk in the Gulf of Lion (41°56′N 4°52′E) by SM U-65 (Imperial German Navy) with the loss of two crew. |
| Origen | United Kingdom | World War I: The cargo ship was sunk in the Atlantic Ocean 115 nautical miles (213 km) west of Ouessant (47°28′N 8°20′W) by SM U-86 (Imperial German Navy) with the loss of a crew member. |
| Westmoor | United Kingdom | World War I: The cargo ship was torpedoed and sunk in the Atlantic Ocean 210 nautical miles (390 km) west of Casablanca, Morocco (34°10′N 11°47′W) by SM U-91 (Imperial German Navy) with the loss of two of her crew. Her captain was taken as a prisoner of war. |

== 2 July ==
List of shipwrecks: 2 July 1918
| Ship | State | Description |
|---|---|---|
| Admiral | United Kingdom | World War I: The tug was shelled and sunk in the North Sea 2 nautical miles (3.7 km) north of Flamborough Head, Yorkshire by SM UB-40 (Imperial German Navy). Her crew survived. |
| Erme | United Kingdom | World War I: The auxiliary sailing vessel was scuttled in the Atlantic Ocean 240 nautical miles (440 km) north west by west of the Fastnet Rock (52°30′N 16°00′W) by SM U-53 (Imperial German Navy). Her crew survived. |
| Shirala | United Kingdom | World War I: The cargo ship was torpedoed and sunk in the English Channel 4 nautical miles (7.4 km) north east by east of the Owers Lightship (United Kingdom) by SM UB-57 (Imperial German Navy) with the loss of eight of her crew. |

== 3 July ==
List of shipwrecks: 3 July 1918
| Ship | State | Description |
|---|---|---|
| Agia Trias | Greece | World War I: The sailing vessel was sunk in the Mediterranean Sea (36°05′N 22°10′E) by SM U-27 (Austro-Hungarian Navy). Her crew survived. |
| Evangelistria | Greece | World War I: The sailing vessel was sunk in the Mediterranean Sea (36°39′N 22°18′E) by SM U-27 (Austro-Hungarian Navy). Her crew survived. |
| Freyea | United States | While the 15-gross register ton motor vessel was on the beach at Hadley (55°32′N 132°17′W), Territory of Alaska, for overhaul, she suffered an explosion and was destroyed by the ensuing fire. The only person aboard survived. |
| Gripen | Sweden | World War I: The wooden barque was shelled and sunk in the Skagerrak 5 nautical miles (9.3 km) off the Ryvingen Lighthouse, Vest-Agder, Norway by SM U-80 (Imperial German Navy), with the loss of two of the crew. |
| Panaghia | Greece | World War I: The sailing vessel was sunk in the North Sea 36°05′N 22°10′E) by SM U-27 (Austro-Hungarian Navy). Her crew survived. |
| P. C. Petersen | Norway | World War I: The sailing vessel was sunk in the North Sea 55 nautical miles (102 km) west of Lindesnes, Vest-Agder by SM U-80 (Imperial German Navy). Her crew survived. |

== 4 July ==
List of shipwrecks: 4 July 1918
| Ship | State | Description |
|---|---|---|
| Cordova | Italy | World War I: The cargo ship was sunk in the Mediterranean Sea off Taormina, Sicily (37°51′N 15°25′E) by SM UC-52 (Imperial German Navy). |
| Mentor | Norway | World War I: The sailing vessel was torpedoed and damaged in the North Sea 12 nautical miles (22 km) east of Hartlepool, County Durham, United Kingdom by SM UB-21 (Imperial German Navy) with the loss of a crew member. She was towed in to port but was a constructive total loss. |
| Napoli | Italy | World War I: Convoy GaG 36: The ship collided with a vessel from Convoy GaG 37 in the Mediterranean Sea and sank. |
| SM U-20 | Austro-Hungarian Navy | World War I: The U-20-class submarine was torpedoed and sunk in the Adriatic Sea (45°29′N 13°05′E) by the submarine F-12 (Regia Marina) with the loss of all 18 crew. |

== 5 July ==
List of shipwrecks: 5 July 1918
| Ship | State | Description |
|---|---|---|
| Columbia | United States | The passenger ship capsized and sank in the Illinois River in 18 feet (5.5 m) of water after scraping a line of trees on the river bank in dense fog with the loss of 87 or 175 lives. |
| Vera Elizabeth | United Kingdom | World War I: The auxiliary schooner was shelled and sunk in the Atlantic Ocean 54 nautical miles (100 km) south by east of Suðuroy, Faroe Islands (60°42′N 5°32′W) by SM U-60 (Imperial German Navy). Her crew survived. |

== 6 July ==
List of shipwrecks: 6 July 1918
| Ship | State | Description |
|---|---|---|
| Bertrand | United Kingdom | World War I: The cargo ship was torpedoed and sunk in the Mediterranean Sea 28 nautical miles (52 km) east south east of Cape Bon, Algeria (36°58′N 11°36′E) by SM UC-67 (Imperial German Navy). Her crew survived. |
| HMS C25 | Royal Navy | World War I: The C-class submarine was bombed and damaged in the North Sea off Orford Ness, Suffolk by Luftstreitkrafte aircraft with the loss of four of her crew. She was taken in tow by HMS E51 (Royal Navy) but was declared a constructive total loss. |
| Gullfaxi | (Denmark) Iceland | World War I: The fishing vessel was sunk in the Atlantic Ocean south of Iceland by SM U-53 (Imperial German Navy). |
| Port Hardy | United Kingdom | World War I: The cargo ship was torpedoed and sunk in the Atlantic Ocean 78 nautical miles (144 km) west of Cape Spartel, Morocco (35°44′N 7°35′W) by SM U-91 (Imperial German Navy) with the loss of seven of her crew. |
| San Nicola | Italy | World War I: The sailing vessel was sunk in the Mediterranean Sea (36°06′N 25°19′E) by SM U-27 (Austro-Hungarian Navy). Her crew survived. |

== 7 July ==
List of shipwrecks: 7 July 1918
| Ship | State | Description |
|---|---|---|
| Aby | United Kingdom | World War I: The fishing vessel was scuttled in the North Sea 25 nautical miles (46 km) east by north of Spurn Point, Yorkshire by SM UB-40 (Imperial German Navy). Her crew survived. |
| Albion | United Kingdom | World War I: The fishing vessel was scuttled in the North Sea 25 nautical miles (46 km) east by north of Spurn Point by SM UB-40 (Imperial German Navy). Her crew survived. |
| Carl | Denmark | World War I: The cargo ship was sunk in the Atlantic Ocean south of Ireland (49°20′N 9°40′W) by SM U-70 (Imperial German Navy) with the loss of fourteen crew. |
| SMS T172 | Imperial German Navy | World War I: The S138-class torpedo boat struck a mine and sank in the North Sea with the loss of sixteen of her crew. |
| Giuseppino Padre | Italy | World War I: The sailing vessel was sunk in the Mediterranean Sea (37°30′N 18°30′E) by SM U-27 (Austro-Hungarian Navy). Her crew survived. |
| Marosa | Norway | World War I: The full-rigged ship was scuttled in the Atlantic Ocean (40°00′N 50°35′W) by SM U-156 (Imperial German Navy). Her crew survived. |
| SMS T138 | Imperial German Navy | World War I: The S138-class torpedo boat struck a mine and sank in the North Sea with the loss of 32 of her crew. |
| Vergine di Lourdes | Italy | World War I: The sailing vessel was sunk in the Mediterranean Sea off Sicily by SM UC-52 (Imperial German Navy). |

== 8 July ==
List of shipwrecks: 8 July 1918
| Ship | State | Description |
|---|---|---|
| Ben Lomond | United Kingdom | World War I: The cargo ship was torpedoed and sunk in the Irish Sea 30 nautical miles (56 km) south east of the Daunt Rock by SM U-92 (Imperial German Navy) with the loss of 23 crew. |
| Chicago | United Kingdom | World War I: The cargo ship was torpedoed and sunk in the North Sea 4 nautical miles (7.4 km) north east of Flamborough Head, Yorkshire by SM UB-107 (Imperial German Navy) with the loss of three of her crew. |
| Horta | Portugal | World War I: The cargo ship was sunk in the Strait of Sicily by SM UC-73 (Imperial German Navy). Her crew survived. |
| Manx King | Norway | World War I: The full-rigged ship was scuttled in the Atlantic Ocean (40°05′N 52°00′W) by SM U-156 (Imperial German Navy). Her crew survived. |
| Mars | United Kingdom | World War I: The cargo ship was torpedoed and sunk in the Atlantic Ocean 74 nautical miles (137 km) west by north of the Bishop Rock, Isles of Scilly (49°44′N 8°20′W) by SM U-92 (Imperial German Navy). Her crew survived. |
| San Nicola | Greece | World War I: The sailing vessel was sunk in the Aegean Sea off Andros by SM UC-37 (Imperial German Navy). |
| War Crocus | United Kingdom | World War I: The cargo ship was torpedoed and sunk in the North Sea 2.5 nautical miles (4.6 km) east by north of Flamborough Head by SM UB-107 (Imperial German Navy). Her crew survived. |

== 9 July ==
List of shipwrecks: 9 July 1918
| Ship | State | Description |
|---|---|---|
| HM CMB-2 | Royal Navy | The Coastal Motor Boat was lost on this date. |
| Frederika | Netherlands | World War I: The sailing vessel was sunk in the North Sea 20 nautical miles (37 km) off the Maas Lightship (Netherlands) by SM UC-70 (Imperial German Navy). Her crew survived. |
| Fryken | Sweden | World War I: The coaster was sunk in the Humber Estuary (53°27′N 0°29′E) by SM UB-107 (Imperial German Navy). Her crew survived. |
| Sewalls Point | United States | The cargo ship was wrecked when she ran aground near Halifax, Nova Scotia.(44°40′N 63°42′W). |
| Silvia | Italy | World War I: The cargo ship was sunk in the Atlantic Ocean west of Gibraltar (35°54′N 7°18′W) by SM U-91 (Imperial German Navy). |
| Tris Adelphi | Greece | World War I: The sailing vessel was sunk in the Mediterranean Sea (35°47′N 25°19′E) by SM U-27 (Austro-Hungarian Navy). Her crew survived. |

== 10 July ==
List of shipwrecks: 10 July 1918
| Ship | State | Description |
|---|---|---|
| SMS A79 | Imperial German Navy | World War I: The A56-class torpedo boat struck a mine and sank in the North Sea with the loss of 53 of her crew. |
| Agios Georgios | Greece | World War I: The sailing vessel was sunk in the Mediterranean Sea (35°47′N 25°19′E) by SM U-27 (Austro-Hungarian Navy). Her crew survived. |
| Agios Loukis | Greece | World War I: The sailing vessel was sunk in the Mediterranean Sea (35°45′N 25°19′E) by SM U-27 (Austro-Hungarian Navy). Her crew survived. |
| USS ML-3429 | United States Navy | The motor launch was shelled and sunk near Nieuport, Belgium by German shore batteries. |
| SMS S62 | Imperial German Navy | World War I: The V25-class torpedo boat struck a mine and sank in the North Sea with the loss of 27 of her crew. |
| SMS S66 | Imperial German Navy | World War I: The V25-class torpedo boat struck a mine and sank in the North Sea with the loss of 76 of her crew. |

== 11 July ==
List of shipwrecks: 11 July 1918
| Ship | State | Description |
|---|---|---|
| Agios Constantinos | Greece | World War I: The sailing vessel was sunk in the Mediterranean Sea (35°38′N 25°12′E) by SM U-27 (Austro-Hungarian Navy). Her crew survived. |
| Bacchus | France | World War I: The cargo ship was torpedoed and sunk in the Ionian Sea 78 nautical miles (144 km) south west of Sapienza (36°25′N 20°19′E) by SM UB-51 (Imperial German Navy) with the loss of 28 crew. |
| Induna | United Kingdom | The 380-foot (120 m) cargo ship was sunk in a collision with Principe Di Udine (Italy) in the South Atlantic off the southern coast of Brazil. |
| Kong Guttorm | Norway | World War I: The coaster was sunk in the English Channel 30 nautical miles (56 km) south east of Portland Bill, Dorset, United Kingdom by SM UB-103 (Imperial German Navy) with the loss of eleven of her crew. |
| Marigo | Greece | World War I: The sailing vessel was sunk in the Mediterranean Sea (36°59′N 34°08′E) by SM U-27 (Austro-Hungarian Navy). Her crew survived. |
| Robert G. Cann | Canada | The 111-ton vessel was wrecked off Little Hope Island. |
| Roberto | Spain | World War I: The coaster was sunk in the Mediterranean Sea 60 nautical miles (110 km) north of Alexandria, Egypt by SM UC-74 (Imperial German Navy). Her crew survived. |
| USS Westover | United States Navy | World War I: The cargo ship was sunk in the Atlantic Ocean south of Ireland (46°36′N 12°21′W) by SM U-92 (Imperial German Navy) with the loss of eleven of her crew. |

== 12 July ==
List of shipwrecks: 12 July 1918
| Ship | State | Description |
|---|---|---|
| Kawachi | Imperial Japanese Navy | The Kawachi-class battleship suffered an onboard explosion and sank at Tokuyama with the loss of 621 of her 1,059 crew. The hulk was subsequently scrapped. |

== 13 July ==
List of shipwrecks: 13 July 1918
| Ship | State | Description |
|---|---|---|
| Badagri | United Kingdom | World War I: The Elder Dempster 2,956 grt cargo ship was torpedoed and sunk in the Atlantic Ocean 425 nautical miles (787 km) west north west of Cape St. Vincent, Portugal (35°17′N 16°50′W) by SM U-91 (Imperial German Navy). Her crew survived, but her captain was taken as a prisoner of war. |
| Evelyn M. Thompson | United States | The fishing steamer went to pieces after going ashore on Nantucket, Massachusetts. |
| Plawsworth | United Kingdom | World War I: The cargo ship was torpedoed and sunk in the Atlantic Ocean 105 nautical miles (194 km) west by north of the Bishop Rock, Isles of Scilly (49°36′N 9°10′W) by SM U-60 (Imperial German Navy) with the loss of a crew member. |
| Ponta Delgada | Portugal | World War I: The cargo ship was sunk in the Mediterranean Sea 50 nautical miles (93 km) off Oran, Algeria by SM UC-54 (Imperial German Navy). Her crew survived. |
| Ramon de Larrinaga | Spain | World War I: The cargo ship was sunk in the Atlantic Ocean 180 nautical miles (330 km) off Cape Finisterre by SM U-92 (Imperial German Navy). Her crew survived. |

== 14 July ==
List of shipwrecks: 14 July 1918
| Ship | State | Description |
|---|---|---|
| Branksome Hall | United Kingdom | World War I: The cargo ship was torpedoed and sunk in the Mediterranean Sea (68 nautical miles (126 km) north west of Marsa Susa, Libya by SM UB-105 (Imperial German Navy). Her crew survived. |
| Djemnah | France | World War I: The passenger ship was torpedoed and sunk in the Mediterranean Sea of the coast of Libya (33°12′N 23°55′E) by SM UB-105 (Imperial German Navy) with the loss of 436 of the 754 people on board. |
| Hagios Zion | Greece | World War I: The sailboat was sunk in the Aegean Sea (38°20′N 25°35′E) by SM UC-37 (Imperial German Navy). |
| HMT Loch Tummel | Royal Navy | The naval trawler was lost on this date. |
| Maria José | Portugal | World War I: The sailing vessel was sunk in the Bristol Channel 25 nautical miles (46 km) south west of Lundy Island, Devon, United Kingdom by SM UB-65 (Imperial German Navy). |
| Maurice | France | World War I: The sailing vessel was sunk in the Atlantic Ocean off Barra Head, Outer Hebrides, United Kingdom by SM U-98 (Imperial German Navy). |
| SM UC-77 | Imperial German Navy | World War I: The Type UC II submarine struck a mine and sank in the North Sea off the coast of West Flanders, Belgium. |
| Waitemata | United Kingdom | World War I: The collier was torpedoed and sunk in the Mediterranean Sea 100 nautical miles (190 km) east by north of Marsa Susa (33°12′N 24°10′E) by SM UB-105 (Imperial German Navy). Her crew survived. |

== 15 July ==
List of shipwrecks: 15 July 1918
| Ship | State | Description |
|---|---|---|
| Barunga | United Kingdom | World War I: The cargo ship was torpedoed and sunk in the Atlantic Ocean 150 nautical miles (280 km) west by south of the Bishop Rock, Isles of Scilly (49°00′N 15°00′W) by SM U-108 (Imperial German Navy). All on board survived. |
| Cap Breton | France | World War I: The cargo ship was sunk in the Gironde Estuary 14 nautical miles (26 km) south west of the Cordouan Lighthouse by SM UB-103 (Imperial German Navy). |
| HMS Speedwell II | Royal Navy | The Q-ship was lost on this date. |
| Vendée | France | World War I: The cargo ship was sunk in the Bay of Biscay off Soulac-sur-Mer, Gironde by SM UB-103 (Imperial German Navy). |

== 16 July ==
List of shipwrecks: 16 July 1918
| Ship | State | Description |
|---|---|---|
| HMS Anchusa | Royal Navy | World War I: The Anchusa-class sloop was sunk in the Atlantic Ocean north of Ireland by SM U-54 (Imperial German Navy) with the loss of 78 of her 93 crew. |
| Fisherman | United Kingdom | World War I: The schooner was shelled and sunk in the Atlantic Ocean 380 nautical miles (700 km) north west by west of Cabo da Roca, Portugal (40°17′N 18°20′W) by SM U-91 (Imperial German Navy). Her crew survived. |
| Garibaldino | Regia Marina | The Soldati-class destroyer was rammed and sunk in the Mediterranean Sea off Villefranche-sur-Mer, Alpes-Maritimes, France by the naval trawler HMT Cygnet (Royal Navy). |
| Lyndiane | France | World War I: The cargo ship was sunk in the Bay of Biscay by SM UB-103 (Imperial German Navy) with the loss of four of her fourteen crew. The submarine then rammed a raft with a number of survivors before departing the area, killing many of them. Eight survivors of the sixteen people on board were rescued by Villanil (Spanish Navy) and some Spanish fishing vessels. |
| Miefield | Norway | World War I: The barque was shelled and scuttled in the Atlantic Ocean 82 nautical miles (152 km) south west of the Fastnet Rock (50°44′N 11°21′W) by SM U-55 (Imperial German Navy). Her crew survived. |
| Southborough | United Kingdom | World War I: The cargo ship was torpedoed and sunk in the North Sea 5 nautical miles (9.3 km) north by east of Scarborough, Yorkshire by SM UB-110 (Imperial German Navy) with the loss of 30 of her crew. |
| Vanlock | Sweden | World War I: The sailing vessel was shelled and sunk in the Atlantic Ocean 140 nautical miles (260 km) west of Tory Island, County Donegal, United Kingdom by SM U-92 (Imperial German Navy). |
| War Swallow | United Kingdom | World War I: The cargo ship was torpedoed and sunk in the Mediterranean Sea 72 nautical miles (133 km) south west by south of Malta (34°35′N 15°00′E) by SM UB-50 (Imperial German Navy) with the loss of seven crew. |
| Yorkmoor | United Kingdom | The 369-foot (112 m), 4,253-ton cargo ship was wrecked at Lobos Island in the Rio de la Plata. |

== 17 July ==
List of shipwrecks: 17 July 1918
| Ship | State | Description |
|---|---|---|
| Carpathia | United Kingdom | RMS Carpathia. World War I: The troopship was torpedoed and sunk in the Celtic Sea 170 nautical miles (310 km) west by north of the Bishop Rock, Isles of Scilly (50°25′N 10°49′W) by SM U-55 (Imperial German Navy) with the loss of five of the 280 people on board. Survivors were rescued by HMS Snowdrop (Royal Navy). |
| Harlseywood | United Kingdom | World War I: The cargo ship was torpedoed and damaged in the Atlantic Ocean south west of Hartland Point, Devon by SM U-60 (Imperial German Navy). She was beached but was later refloated. |
| Saint Georges | France | World War I: The coaster was torpedoed and sunk in the Atlantic Ocean 15 nautical miles (28 km) south west of Hartland Point (50°47′N 4°38′W) by SM U-60 (Imperial German Navy). Her crew survived. |

== 18 July ==
List of shipwrecks: 18 July 1918
| Ship | State | Description |
|---|---|---|
| HMT Lance II | Royal Navy | The naval trawler sank in the English Channel 3.2 nautical miles (5.9 km) south west of Newhaven, Sussex. |
| Scow No. 12 | United States | The scow sank near the United States Army Quartermasters Terminal, South Boston, Massachusetts. |

== 19 July ==
List of shipwrecks: 19 July 1918
| Ship | State | Description |
|---|---|---|
| Adria 1 | Italy | World War I: The cargo ship was sunk in the Strait of Sicily (37°10′N 11°12′E) by SM UB-50 (Imperial German Navy). Her crew survived. |
| Australien | France | World War I: The passenger ship was sunk in the Mediterranean Sea 26 nautical miles (48 km) north east of Cap Bon, Tunisia by SM UC-54 (Imperial German Navy) with the loss of three of her 951 passengers and seventeen of her crew. |
| HM CMB-50 | Royal Navy | The Coastal Motor Boat was lost on this date. |
| Eguskia | Spain | World War I: The cargo ship was sunk in the Mediterranean Sea 70 nautical miles (130 km) north of Bardia, Libya by SM UB-105 (Imperial German Navy). Her crew survived. |
| Justicia | United Kingdom | World War I: The troopship was torpedoed and damaged in the Atlantic Ocean off Malin Head, County Donegal by SM UB-64 (Imperial German Navy). She was taken in tow but was torpedoed and sunk the next day (55°38′N 7°39′W) by SM UB-124 (Imperial German Navy) with the loss of ten of her crew. |
| Ranger | United Kingdom | World War I: The auxiliary sailing vessel was scuttled in the Atlantic Ocean 20 nautical miles (37 km) north west of Barra Head, Outer Hebrides by SM UB-64 (Imperial German Navy). Her crew survived. |
| USS San Diego | United States Navy | USS San Diego World War I: The Pennsylvania-class armored cruiser struck a mine and sank in the Atlantic Ocean off the Fire Island Lightship (United States Navy) with the loss of six of her 830 crew. |
| SM UB-110 | Imperial German Navy | World War I: The Type UB III submarine was depth charged, rammed and sunk in the North Sea (54°39′N 0°55′E) by HMS Garry (Royal Navy) with the loss of thirteen of her crew. |

== 20 July ==
List of shipwrecks: 20 July 1918
| Ship | State | Description |
|---|---|---|
| HMS E34 | Royal Navy | World War I: The E-class submarine struck a mine and sank in the Wadden Sea between Texel, North Holland and Vlieland, Friesland, Netherlands with the loss of all 30 crew. |
| Gemini | United Kingdom | World War I: The cargo ship was torpedoed and sunk in the Atlantic Ocean 7 nautical miles (13 km) north west of the Godrevy Lighthouse, Cornwall (50°17′N 5°36′W) by SM U-60 (Imperial German Navy) with the loss of two crew. |
| Hermes | Denmark | World War I: The three-masted schooner was sunk in the North Sea 40 nautical miles (74 km) west of Bergen, Hordaland, Norway by SM U-113 (Imperial German Navy). Her crew survived. |
| Kosseir | United Kingdom | World War I: The cargo ship was torpedoed and sunk in the Mediterranean Sea 40 nautical miles (74 km) north east by north of Alexandria, Egypt (31°45′N 30°11′E) by SM UB-51 (Imperial German Navy) with the loss of 39 crew. |
| Orfordness | United Kingdom | World War I: The cargo ship was torpedoed and sunk in the Atlantic Ocean 2.5 nautical miles (4.6 km) west by north of Newquay, Cornwall (50°24′N 5°11′W) by SM U-60 (Imperial German Navy) with the loss of two crew. |
| SM UB-124 | Imperial German Navy | World War I: The Type UB III submarine was depth charged and damaged in the Atlantic Ocean off the coast of Ireland. She was consequently scuttled with the loss of two of her crew. |

== 21 July ==
List of shipwrecks: 21 July 1918
| Ship | State | Description |
|---|---|---|
| Anna | Denmark | World War I: The barquentine was sunk in the North Sea 35 nautical miles (65 km) off Bergen, Hordaland, Norway by SM U-113 (Imperial German Navy). Her crew survived. |
| Arvor | France | World War I: The coaster was sunk in the Atlantic Ocean 27 nautical miles (50 km) north of Ouessant, Finistère (48°55′N 4°09′W) by SM UB-103 (Imperial German Navy). |
| Kongen | Norway | World War I: The sailing vessel was damaged in the North Sea 70 nautical miles (130 km) south west of Lindesnes, Rogaland by SM UB-113 (Imperial German Navy). She was abandoned by her crew. The derelict was scuttled on 5 August by HMS G1 (Royal Navy). |
| Lansford | United States | World War I: Attack on Orleans: The schooner barge, being towed by Perth Amboy (United States), was shelled and sunk in the Atlantic Ocean 3 nautical miles (5.6 km) off Orleans, Massachusetts by SM U-156 (Imperial German Navy). Her captain was wounded. |
| Mongolian | United Kingdom | World War I: The passenger ship was torpedoed and sunk in the North Sea 5 nautical miles (9.3 km) south east of Filey, Yorkshire (54°10′N 0°58′W) by SM UC-70 (Imperial German Navy) with the loss of 36 lives. |
| 703 | United States | World War I: Attack on Orleans: The barge, being towed by Perth Amboy (United States), was shelled and sunk in the Atlantic Ocean 3 nautical miles (5.6 km) off Orleans, Massachusetts by SM U-156 (Imperial German Navy). |
| 740 | United States | World War I: Attack on Orleans: The barge, being towed by Perth Amboy (United States), was shelled and sunk in the Atlantic Ocean 3 nautical miles (5.6 km) off Orleans, Massachusetts by SM U-156 (Imperial German Navy). |
| 766 | United States | World War I: Attack on Orleans: The barge, being towed by Perth Amboy (United States), was shelled and sunk in the Atlantic Ocean 3 nautical miles (5.6 km) off Orleans, Massachusetts by SM U-156 (Imperial German Navy). Her crew survived. |

== 22 July ==
List of shipwrecks: 22 July 1918
| Ship | State | Description |
|---|---|---|
| Delo Sovetov | Soviet Navy Red Movement | Russian Civil War: The gunboat was damaged by Czechoslovak Legion gunboats and was beached and abandoned on the Volga River. |
| HMT Ijuin | Royal Navy | World War I: The naval trawler was shelled and sunk in the Mediterranean Sea off Alexandria, Egypt (32°42′N 28°25′E) by SM UB-51 (Imperial German Navy). Her crew survived. |
| L 1 | Royal Navy | World War I: The barge was sunk in the Mediterranean Sea (32°37′N 28°39′E) by SM UB-51 (Imperial German Navy). Her crew survived. |
| Robert & Richard | United States | World War I: The schooner was scuttled in the Atlantic Ocean 60 nautical miles (110 km) south east of Cape Porpoise, Maine by SM U-156 (Imperial German Navy). Her crew survived. |

== 23 July ==
List of shipwrecks: 23 July 1918
| Ship | State | Description |
|---|---|---|
| Anna Sofie | United Kingdom | World War I: The cargo ship was torpedoed and sunk in the Atlantic Ocean 4 nautical miles (7.4 km) north of Trevose Head, Cornwall by SM U-55 (Imperial German Navy) with the loss of a crew member. |
| HMS Marmora | Royal Navy | World War I: The armed merchant cruiser was sunk in the Atlantic Ocean south of Ireland (50°24′N 8°48′W) by SM UB-64 (Imperial German Navy) with the loss of ten of her crew. |
| Messidor | United Kingdom | World War I: The cargo ship was torpedoed and sunk in the Mediterranean Sea 73 nautical miles (135 km) south east by south of Mahón, Spain by SM UB-50 (Imperial German Navy) with the loss of a crew member. |

== 24 July ==
List of shipwrecks: 24 July 1918
| Ship | State | Description |
|---|---|---|
| Kilkis | Greece | World War I: The cargo ship was torpedoed and sunk in the North Sea 6 nautical miles (11 km) off the South Gare Lightship (United Kingdom) (54°42′N 1°01′W) by SM UC-70 (Imperial German Navy). |
| HMT Lochiel | Royal Navy | World War I: The naval trawler was either torpedoed or struck a mine and sank in the North Sea (54°36′30″N 0°4′00″W) with the loss of twelve of her crew. |
| HMS Pincher | Royal Navy | The Beagle-class destroyer ran aground on the Seven Stones reef and was wrecked. |
| Rutherglen | United Kingdom | World War I: The cargo ship was torpedoed and sunk in the Mediterranean Sea 50 nautical miles (93 km) east south east of Mahón, Spain by SM UB-50 (Imperial German Navy). Her crew survived. |
| Scow 111 | United States | The scow sank at the Crowninshield Shipbuilding Company, Fall River, Massachusetts. |

== 25 July ==
List of shipwrecks: 25 July 1918
| Ship | State | Description |
|---|---|---|
| Asta | Denmark | World War I: The three-masted auxiliary schooner was shelled and sunk in the Atlantic Ocean 600 nautical miles (1,100 km) west north west of the Hebrides, United Kingdom by SM UB-89 (Imperial German Navy) with the loss of five of her crew. |
| Indore | United Kingdom | World War I: The cargo ship was torpedoed and damaged in the Atlantic Ocean 20 nautical miles (37 km) north north west of Rathlin Island, County Donegal by SM UB-62 (Imperial German Navy) with the loss of two of her crew. She was beached but was later refloated. |
| Magellan | United Kingdom | World War I: The cargo ship was torpedoed and sunk in the Mediterranean Sea 53 nautical miles (98 km) north of Cape Serrat, Tunisia by SM UB-50 (Imperial German Navy) with the loss of a crew member. |
| Tippecanoe | United States | World War I: The cargo ship was sunk in the Atlantic Ocean 550 nautical miles (1,020 km) off Brest, Finistère, France (40°57′N 15°25′W) by SM U-91 (Imperial German Navy) with the loss of one of her crew. |

== 26 July ==
List of shipwrecks: 26 July 1918
| Ship | State | Description |
|---|---|---|
| Blairhall | United Kingdom | World War I: The cargo ship was torpedoed and sunk in the North Sea 3.5 nautical miles (6.5 km) north east of Sunderland, County Durham, by SM UC-40 (Imperial German Navy) with the loss of a crew member. |
| Boy Jack | United Kingdom | World War I: The fishing smack was scuttled in the North Sea 4 nautical miles (7.4 km) east of the Cross Sands Lightship (United Kingdom) by SM UB-40 (Imperial German Navy) with the loss of three of her crew. |
| Godesgenage | Belgium | World War I: The fishing vessel was scuttled in the North Sea off the Cross Sands Lightship by SM UB-40 (Imperial German Navy). |

== 27 July ==
List of shipwrecks: 27 July 1918
| Ship | State | Description |
|---|---|---|
| Antonio S | Italy | World War I: The barquentine was shelled and sunk in the Mediterranean Sea (35°27′N 11°09′E) by SM UB-50 (Imperial German Navy). |
| Chloris | United Kingdom | World War I: The coaster was torpedoed and sunk in the North Sea 17 nautical miles (31 km) south by east of Flamborough Head, Yorkshire (53°52′N 0°10′E) by SM UB-107 (Imperial German Navy) with the loss of three of her crew. |
| Counsellor | United Kingdom | World War I: The fishing smack was scuttled in the North Sea 2.5 nautical miles (4.6 km) north of the Haisborough Lightship (United Kingdom) by SM UB-40 (Imperial German Navy). Her crew survived. |
| Crimdon | Sweden | World War I: The cargo ship was torpedoed and sunk in the North Sea 2.5 nautical miles (4.6 km) east of the Whitby Lighthouse, Yorkshire by SM UC-40 (Imperial German Navy) with the loss of four of her crew. |
| Fear Not | United Kingdom | World War I: The fishing smack was scuttled in the North Sea 14 nautical miles (26 km) north north east of the Haisborough Lightship (United Kingdom) by SM UB-40 (Imperial German Navy). Her crew survived. |
| I'll Try | United Kingdom | World War I: The fishing smack was scuttled in the North Sea 12 nautical miles (22 km) north north east of the Haisborough Lightship (United Kingdom) by SM UB-40 (Imperial German Navy). Her crew survived. |
| John Rettig | Sweden | World War I: The cargo ship was sunk in the North Sea 18 nautical miles (33 km) south of Flamborough Head by SM UB-107 (Imperial German Navy). Her crew survived. |
| Kirkham Abbey | United Kingdom | World War I: The cargo liner was torpedoed and sunk in the North Sea 2 nautical miles (3.7 km) off Winterton-on-Sea (52°44′N 1°42′E) by SM UB-40 (Imperial German Navy) with the loss of eight lives. |
| Le Bijou | United Kingdom | World War I: The fishing smack was scuttled in the North Sea 9 nautical miles (17 km) north east of the Haisborough Lightship (United Kingdom) by SM UB-40 (Imperial German Navy). Her crew survived. |
| Paragon | United Kingdom | World War I: The fishing smack was scuttled in the North Sea 8 nautical miles (15 km) north east of the Haisborough Lightship (United Kingdom) by SM UB-40 (Imperial German Navy). Her crew survived. |
| Passion Flower | United Kingdom | World War I: The fishing smack was scuttled in the North Sea 14 nautical miles (26 km) north east of the Haisborough Lightship (United Kingdom) by SM UB-40 (Imperial German Navy). Her crew survived. |
| Porto | Portugal | World War I: The barque was scuttled in the Atlantic Ocean 340 nautical miles (630 km) off Cape Sable, Florida (39°18′N 60°40′W) by SM U-140 (Imperial German Navy). Her crew survived. |
| Subadar | United Kingdom | World War I: The cargo ship was torpedoed and sunk in the Atlantic Ocean 112 nautical miles (207 km) north by west of the Cabo da Roca, Portugal by SM U-43 (Imperial German Navy) with the loss of three crew. |
| Success | United Kingdom | World War I: The fishing smack was shelled and sunk in the North Sea 7 nautical miles (13 km) north north east of the Haisborough Lightship (United Kingdom) by SM UB-40 (Imperial German Navy). Her crew survived. |
| Valour | United Kingdom | World War I: The fishing smack was scuttled in the North Sea 14 nautical miles (26 km) north north east of the Haisborough Lightship (United Kingdom) by SM UB-40 (Imperial German Navy). Her crew survived. |

== 28 July ==
List of shipwrecks: 28 July 1918
| Ship | State | Description |
|---|---|---|
| Capital | United States | The dredge sank at South Boston, Massachusetts. |
| Francis Robert | United Kingdom | World War I: The fishing smack was shelled and sunk in the North Sea 8 nautical miles (15 km) north east of the Haisborough Lightship (United Kingdom) by SM UB-40 (Imperial German Navy). Her crew survived. |
| Hyperia | United Kingdom | World War I: The troopship was torpedoed and sunk in the Mediterranean Sea 84 nautical miles (156 km) north west by north of Port Said, Egypt (32°21′N 31°25′E) by SM UB-51 (Imperial German Navy) with the loss of 65 lives. |

== 29 July ==
List of shipwrecks: 29 July 1918
| Ship | State | Description |
|---|---|---|
| Laie Cirystal | United States | The steamer went ashore on Block Island, Rhode Island. |
| Rio Pallaresa | United Kingdom | World War I: The cargo ship was torpedoed and sunk in the Mediterranean Sea 62 nautical miles (115 km) east north east of Malta by SM UC-25 (Imperial German Navy) with the loss of two of her crew. |

== 30 July ==
List of shipwrecks: 30 July 1918
| Ship | State | Description |
|---|---|---|
| Addie and Carrie | United States | The lighter sank at New London, Connecticut after the swell from a submarine and a sub chaser forced her against some rocks. Raised, repaired and returned to service. |
| HMS Stock Force | Royal Navy | World War I: The Q-ship was torpedoed and damaged in the English Channel 25 nautical miles (46 km) west of Start Point, Devon (49°49′N 3°53′W) by SM UB-80 (Imperial German Navy). She counter-attacked and severely damaged UB-80, earning her commander Harold Auten a Victoria Cross. HMS Stock Force later sank in Bigbury Bay. |

== 31 July ==
List of shipwrecks: 31 July 1918
| Ship | State | Description |
|---|---|---|
| Alkor | Norway | World War I: The sailing vessel was sunk in the North Sea off the south coast of Norway by SM U-98 (Imperial German Navy). Her crew survived. |
| HMT City of Liverpool | Royal Navy | World War I: The naval trawler struck a mine and sank in The Downs with the loss of ten of her crew. |
| USS C. F. Sargent | United States Navy | The schooner barge used as a collier foundered off the Hen and Chicken Shoals. |
| SMS M6 | Imperial German Navy | World War I: The M1-class minesweeper was sunk by mines in the North Sea. |
| Poseidon | United States | The steamer sank in a collision with Somerset (United States) five miles (8.0 km) north north east of the Five Fathom Bank light station. Five or six people were killed. |
| Scow 36 | United States | The scow sank near the state bulkhead at South Boston, Massachusetts. |

== Unknown date ==
List of shipwrecks: Unknown date 1918
| Ship | State | Description |
|---|---|---|
| USS Oosterdijk | United States Navy | The cargo ship collided with San Jacinto (United States) in the Atlantic Ocean on 9, 10 or 11 July. She foundered on 10 or 11 July. Her crew were rescued by San Jacinto. |
| SM UB-65 | Imperial German Navy | World War I: The Type UB III submarine was lost in the Bristol Channel off Padstow, Cornwall, United Kingdom on or after 14 July with the loss of all 37 crew. |
| SM UB-108 | Imperial German Navy | World War I: the Type UB III submarine struck a mine and sank in the North Sea off the coast of Belgium with the loss of all 36 crew. |
