= SS Rosehill =

Steam collier torpedoed and sunk near Fowey, Cornwall

History
- Name: Minister (1911-1917); Rosehill (1917)
- Owner: Stephenson Clarke Shipping (1911–1917); W. J. Tillett Steam Ship Company Ltd. (1917)
- Builder: S P Austin & Son, Sunderland
- Yard number: 259
- Launched: 26 June 1911
- Fate: Torpedoed and sunk 23 September 1917

General characteristics
- Class & type: Steam collier
- Tonnage: 2,788 GRT
- Length: 314 ft (96 m)
- Beam: 46 ft (14 m)
- Depth: 21 ft (6.4 m)
- Propulsion: 1 × 3 cyl Triple expansion engine; Single shaft; 1 × screw; 2 × boilers
- Armament: 1 × 12-pdr gun

SS Rosehill, also known as SS Penhill, was a 2,788 GRT steel-hulled collier built in 1911 by S.P. Austin and Son of Sunderland under the name Minster. She was torpedoed by the Imperial German Navy submarine UB-40 in the English Channel off Fowey, Cornwall, England, on 23 September 1917 while en route from Cardiff, Wales, to Devonport. She was taken under tow but sank in Whitsand Bay at 18:05. Her wreck lies in 28 metres (92 feet) of water at 50°19.793′N 4°18.520′W with her bow to the north.

This wreck, which has been adopted by Totnes SAC under the "adopt-a-wreck" scheme, is often overlooked by divers, as the wrecks of the Liberty ship SS James Eagan Layne and Royal Navy frigate HMS Scylla are close by and in shallower water. The wreck is considerably broken up, and is hard to find on an echo sounder.
