= SM U-92 =

History

German Empire
- Name: U-92
- Ordered: 23 June 1915
- Builder: Kaiserliche Werft Danzig
- Yard number: 36
- Laid down: 20 August 1916
- Launched: 12 May 1917
- Commissioned: 22 October 1917
- Fate: Lost in minefield 9 September 1918

General characteristics
- Class & type: Type U 87 submarine
- Displacement: 757 t (745 long tons) surfaced; 998 t (982 long tons) submerged
- Length: 65.80 m (215 ft 11 in) (o/a); 50.07 m (164 ft 3 in) (pressure hull)
- Beam: 6.20 m (20 ft 4 in) (o/a); 4.18 m (13 ft 9 in) (pressure hull)
- Height: 9.35 m (30 ft 8 in)
- Draught: 3.88 m (12 ft 9 in)
- Installed power: 2 × 2,400 PS (1,765 kW; 2,367 shp) surfaced; 2 × 1,200 PS (883 kW; 1,184 shp) submerged
- Propulsion: 2 shafts, 2 × 1.66 m (5 ft 5 in) propellers
- Speed: 15.6 knots (28.9 km/h; 18.0 mph) surfaced; 8.6 knots (15.9 km/h; 9.9 mph) submerged
- Range: 11,380 nmi (21,080 km; 13,100 mi) at 8 knots (15 km/h; 9.2 mph) surfaced; 56 nmi (104 km; 64 mi) at 5 knots (9.3 km/h; 5.8 mph) submerged
- Test depth: 50 m (164 ft 1 in)
- Complement: 4 officers, 32 enlisted
- Armament: 4 × 50 cm (19.7 in) torpedo tubes (two bow, two stern); 10-12 torpedoes; 1 × 10.5 cm (4.1 in) SK L/45 deck gun

Service record
- Part of: III Flotilla; 27 December 1917 – 9 September 1918
- Commanders: Kptlt. Max Bieler; 22 October 1917 – 31 May 1918; Kptlt. Günther Ehrlich; 1 June – 9 September 1918
- Operations: 5 patrols
- Victories: 5 merchant ships sunk (15,961 GRT); 2 merchant ships damaged (7,373 GRT)

SM U-92 was one of 329 submarines serving in the Imperial German Navy in World War I. She was engaged in the commerce warfare in the First Battle of the Atlantic.

Construction of U-92 was ordered in August 1915, and her keel was laid down in August 1916 at the Kaiserliche Werft yard in Danzig. She was launched in October 1917, and sunk by mine 9 September 1918.

== Design ==
Type U 87 submarines were preceded by the shorter Type U 81 submarines. U-92 had a displacement of 757 tonnes (745 long tons) when at the surface and 998 tonnes (982 long tons) while submerged. She had a total length of 65.80 m (215 ft 11 in), a pressure hull length of 50.07 m (164 ft 3 in), a beam of 6.20 m (20 ft 4 in), a height of 9.35 m (30 ft 8 in), and a draught of 3.88 m (12 ft 9 in). The submarine was powered by two 2,400 metric horsepower (1,800 kW; 2,400 shp) engines for use while surfaced, and two 1,200 metric horsepower (880 kW; 1,200 shp) engines for use while submerged. She had two propeller shafts. She was capable of operating at depths of up to 50 metres (160 ft).

The submarine had a maximum surface speed of 15.6 knots (28.9 km/h; 18.0 mph) and a maximum submerged speed of 8.6 knots (15.9 km/h; 9.9 mph). When submerged, she could operate for 56 nautical miles (104 km; 64 mi) at 5 knots (9.3 km/h; 5.8 mph); when surfaced, she could travel 11,380 nautical miles (21,080 km; 13,100 mi) at 8 knots (15 km/h; 9.2 mph). U-92 was fitted with four 50 centimetres (20 in) torpedo tubes (two at the bow and two at the stern), ten to twelve torpedoes, ND one 10.5 cm (4.1 in) SK L/45 deck gun. She had a complement of thirty-six (thirty-two crew members and four officers).

== Operations ==
After acceptance trials at Danzig (where she was first detected by Room 40, which followed and recorded all her subsequent movements), commanded by Kapitänleutnant (Lieutenant) Bieler. She joined the Kiel School 2 November 1917, leaving for the North Sea about the end of December 1917, being attached to the 3rd Flotilla at Wilhelmshaven. All her combat operations took place in 1918.

=== 1st Patrol ===
U-92 departed for her first war patrol 1 January, via Heligoland Bight and around Scotland into the northern Bay of Biscay, recording no sinkings, and returning to Wilhelmshaven 30 January.

=== 2nd Patrol ===
Her second patrol began 24 February, and she was assigned to a station southwest of Ireland, transiting the Kiel Canal and the Baltic Sea, due to heavy mining in the North Sea. Again, she scored no victories, but was in the vicinity of The Skaw, at the time the commerce raider Wolf stranded a prize, Igotz Mendi, for two days. She also torpedoed the 7,034-ton steamer British Princess, killing one British seaman, and inflicting damage, none severe enough to keep her victim from reaching port. U-92 returned to Kiel on 23 March.

=== 3rd Patrol ===
After refit, U-92 departed on her third patrol 24 April. She was again assigned to the southwest Ireland station, by way of Heligoland, the Kiel Canal, the Baltic, Denmark, Scotland, and Fair Isle. On this long patrol, from which she returned to Wilhelmshaven on about 28 May (Room 40 was uncertain of the date), she was attacked three times by enemy A/S forces (and once more by patrol seaplane), and again scored no successes. On his return, after his third consecutive dry patrol and in keeping with usual practise for unproductive skippers, Kptlt. Bieler was relieved.

=== 4th Patrol ===
U-92 returned to Ireland station for her fourth patrol, sortieing 29 June, now in the hands of Kptlt. Günther Ehrlich. She came under attack on only the second day of her patrol, south of Dogger Bank, by two torpedoes from submarine E42, Both missed. U-92 attacked a convoy eight days later, on 9 July. She sank two armed steamers, the 2814 ton Ben Lomond 30 nmi (56 km; 35 mi) southeast of Daunts Rock and the 3,550 ton Mars 74 nmi (137 km; 85 mi) west by north of Bishop Rock. and suffered damage in a collision. On 10 July, she fired on the 339 ton armed schooner Charles Theriault with her deck gun, inflicting damage; Theriault was towed to port. The next day she torpedoed and sank the 5,590-ton United States Navy cargo ship USS Westover at 46°36′N 12°21′W with the loss of 11 members of Westover's crew, and on 13 July, the 3058-ton Spanish steamer Ramon de Larrinaga with two torpedoes. By the end of her patrol, on 22 July, she had sunk 22,000 tons of shipping.

=== 5th Patrol ===
For her fifth patrol, she left via Kattegat on 4 September. She was mined 9 September in Area B of the North Sea Mine Barrage, and lost with all hands; her last position was suspected to be 59°0′N 1°30′W."

=== Wreck Site ===
At the end of 2007, her wreck was located there by the British Maritime and Coastguard Agency ship Anglian Sovereign.

== Summary of raiding history ==
Date	Name	Nationality	Tonnage (Note: Merchant ship tonnages are in gross register tons. Military vessels are listed by tons displacement.)	Fate
4 March 1918	British Princess	United Kingdom	7,034	Damaged
8 July 1918	Ben Lomond	United Kingdom	2,814	Sunk
8 July 1918	Mars	United Kingdom	3,550	Sunk
10 July 1918	Charles Theriault	Canada	339	Damaged
11 July 1918	USS Westover	United States Navy	5,769	Sunk
13 July 1918	Ramon De Larrinaga	Spain	3,058	Sunk
16 July 1918	Vanlock	Sweden	770	Sunk

== Bibliography ==
- Gröner, Erich; Jung, Dieter; Maass, Martin (1991). U-boats and Mine Warfare Vessels. German Warships 1815–1945. Vol. 2. Translated by Thomas, Keith; Magowan, Rachel. London: Conway Maritime Press. ISBN 0-85177-593-4.
- Spindler, Arno (1966) [1932]. Der Handelskrieg mit U-Booten. 5 Vols. Berlin: Mittler & Sohn. Vols. 4+5, dealing with 1917+18, are very hard to find: Guildhall Library, London, has them all, also Vol. 1-3 in an English translation: The submarine war against commerce.
- Beesly, Patrick (1982). Room 40: British Naval Intelligence 1914-1918. London: H Hamilton. ISBN 978-0-241-10864-2.
- Halpern, Paul G. (1995). A Naval History of World War I. New York: Routledge. ISBN 978-1-85728-498-0.
- Roessler, Eberhard (1997). Die Unterseeboote der Kaiserlichen Marine. Bonn: Bernard & Graefe. ISBN 978-3-7637-5963-7.
- Schroeder, Joachim (2002). Die U-Boote des Kaisers. Bonn: Bernard & Graefe. ISBN 978-3-7637-6235-4.
- Koerver, Hans Joachim (2008). Room 40: German Naval Warfare 1914-1918. Vol I., The Fleet in Action. Steinbach: LIS Reinisch. ISBN 978-3-902433-76-3.
- Koerver, Hans Joachim (2009). Room 40: German Naval Warfare 1914-1918. Vol II., The Fleet in Being. Steinbach: LIS Reinisch. ISBN 978-3-902433-77-0.
