= SM UB-40 =

Coordinates: 51°13.5′N 2°56′E

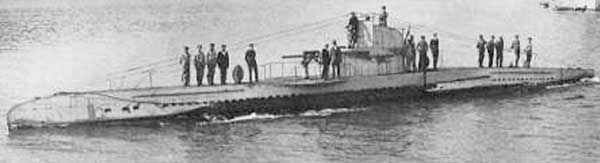
- SM UB-45 a U-boat similar to UB-40

History

German Empire
- Name: UB-40
- Ordered: 22 July 1915
- Builder: Blohm & Voss, Hamburg
- Cost: 1,152,000 German Papiermark
- Yard number: 264
- Launched: 25 April 1916
- Completed: 18 August 1916
- Commissioned: 17 August 1916
- Fate: Scuttled during the retreat from Belgium, 5 October 1918

General characteristics
- Class & type: Type UB II submarine
- Displacement: 274 t (270 long tons) surfaced; 303 t (298 long tons) submerged
- Length: 36.90 m (121 ft 1 in) o/a; 27.90 m (91 ft 6 in) pressure hull
- Beam: 4.37 m (14 ft 4 in) o/a; 3.85 m (12 ft 8 in) pressure hull
- Draught: 3.69 m (12 ft 1 in)
- Propulsion: 1 × propeller shaft; 2 × 6-cylinder diesel engine, 284 PS (209 kW; 280 bhp); 2 × electric motor, 280 PS (210 kW; 280 shp)
- Speed: 9.15 knots (16.95 km/h; 10.53 mph) surfaced; 5.81 knots (10.76 km/h; 6.69 mph) submerged
- Range: 6,450 nmi (11,950 km; 7,420 mi) at 5 knots (9.3 km/h; 5.8 mph) surfaced; 45 nmi (83 km; 52 mi) at 4 knots (7.4 km/h; 4.6 mph) submerged
- Test depth: 50 m (160 ft)
- Complement: 2 officers, 21 men
- Armament: 2 × 50 cm (19.7 in) torpedo tubes; 4 × torpedoes (later 6); 1 × 8.8 cm (3.5 in) Uk L/30 deck gun
- Notes: 42-second diving time

Service record
- Part of: Flandern Flotilla; 10 March 1916 – 2 October 1918
- Commanders: Oblt.z.S. Karl Neumann; 17 August – 2 December 1916; Oblt.z.S. Hans Howaldt; 3 December 1916 – 14 December 1917; Oblt.z.S. Karl Dobberstein; 15 December 1917 – 17 May 1918; Oblt.z.S. Hans Joachim Emsmann; 18 May – 31 July 1918
- Operations: 28 patrols
- Victories: 99 merchant ships sunk (129,330 GRT); 1 auxiliary warship sunk (6,287 GRT); 16 merchant ships damaged (60,629 GRT); 1 merchant ship taken as prize (470 GRT)

SM UB-40 (Note: "SM" stands for "Seiner Majestät" (English: His Majesty's) and combined with the U for Unterseeboot would be translated as His Majesty's Submarine.) was a German Type UB II submarine or U-boat in the German Imperial Navy (German: Kaiserliche Marine) during World War I.

== Design ==
A Type UB II submarine, UB-40 had a displacement of 274 tonnes (270 long tons) when at the surface and 303 tonnes (298 long tons) while submerged. She had a total length of 36.90 m (121 ft 1 in), a beam of 4.37 m (14 ft 4 in), and a draught of 3.69 m (12 ft 1 in). The submarine was powered by two Körting six-cylinder diesel engines producing a total 284 metric horsepower (280 shp; 209 kW), two Siemens-Schuckert electric motors producing 280 metric horsepower (210 kW; 280 shp), and one propeller shaft. She was capable of operating at depths of up to 50 metres (160 ft).

The submarine had a maximum surface speed of 9.15 knots (16.95 km/h; 10.53 mph) and a maximum submerged speed of 5.81 knots (10.76 km/h; 6.69 mph). When submerged, she could operate for 45 nautical miles (83 km; 52 mi) at 4 knots (7.4 km/h; 4.6 mph); when surfaced, she could travel 6,450 nautical miles (11,950 km; 7,420 mi) at 5 knots (9.3 km/h; 5.8 mph). UB-40 was fitted with two 50 centimetres (20 in) torpedo tubes, four torpedoes, and one 8.8 cm (3.5 in) Uk L/30 deck gun. She had a complement of twenty-one crew members and two officers and a 42-second dive time.

== Construction and career ==
The U-boat was ordered on 22 July 1915 and launched on 25 April 1916. She was commissioned into the German Imperial Navy on 17 August 1916 as SM UB-40. (Note: "SM" stands for "Seiner Majestät" (English: His Majesty's) and combined with the U for Unterseeboot would be translated as His Majesty's Submarine.)

The submarine sank 100 ships in 28 patrols. UB-40 was scuttled in Ostend when the German army retreated from Belgium on 5 October 1918.

The wreck of UB-40 has been located & identified by divers in the recent years.

== Summary of raiding history ==
Date	Name	Nationality	Tonnage (Note: Tonnages are in gross register tons)	Fate
20 October 1916	Barbara	United Kingdom	3,740	Sunk
21 October 1916	Cock O’ the Walk	United Kingdom	111	Sunk
22 October 1916	Maris Stella	France	106	Sunk
22 October 1916	Risøy	Norway	1,129	Sunk
7 November 1916	Reime	Norway	1,913	Sunk
8 November 1916	Killellan	United Kingdom	1,971	Sunk
16 November 1916	Alphonse Marceline	Belgium	60	Sunk
16 November 1916	Vanguard	United Kingdom	142	Sunk
17 November 1916	Saint Rogatien	France	1,581	Sunk
21 November 1916	Alice	France	822	Sunk
21 November 1916	Palm Beach	United Kingdom	3,891	Damaged
22 November 1916	Houlgate	France	1,550	Sunk
22 November 1916	City of Mexico	Norway	1,511	Sunk
22 November 1916	Grenada	United Kingdom	2,268	Sunk
28 December 1916	Oldambt	Netherlands	470	Captured as prize
5 February 1917	Anna Prosper	Belgium	70	Sunk
5 February 1917	Emerald	United Kingdom	57	Sunk
21 February 1917	Alice	Norway	709	Sunk
25 February 1917	Maria Adriana	Netherlands	88	Sunk
26 February 1917	Tammerfors	Russian Empire	994	Sunk
28 February 1917	Immaculee Conception	France	36	Sunk
25 March 1917	Etoile De La Mer	France	43	Sunk
25 March 1917	Felix Faure	France	37	Sunk
25 March 1917	Louise	France	45	Sunk
25 March 1917	Marie Louise	France	34	Sunk
25 March 1917	Saint Joseph	France	35	Sunk
29 March 1917	Conoid	United Kingdom	165	Sunk
29 March 1917	Irma	France	32	Sunk
30 March 1917	Somme	United Kingdom	1,828	Sunk
15 April 1917	Möhlenpris	Norway	638	Sunk
16 April 1917	Cairndhu	United Kingdom	4,109	Sunk
16 April 1917	Victoria	United Kingdom	165	Sunk
17 April 1917	HMHS Lanfranc	Royal Navy	6,287	Sunk
19 April 1917	Limeleaf	United Kingdom	7,339	Damaged
3 May 1917	Clodmoor	United Kingdom	3,753	Sunk
15 May 1917	Cuba	United Kingdom	271	Sunk
16 May 1917	Highland Corrie	United Kingdom	7,583	Sunk
16 May 1917	Pagenturm	United Kingdom	5,000	Sunk
17 May 1917	Florence Louisa	United Kingdom	115	Sunk
20 May 1917	Porthkerry	United Kingdom	1,920	Sunk
20 May 1917	Tycho	United Kingdom	3,216	Sunk
21 May 1917	Jupiter	United Kingdom	2,124	Sunk
7 June 1917	Mahopac	United Kingdom	3,216	Damaged
7 June 1917	Oldfield Grange	United Kingdom	4,653	Damaged
8 June 1917	Phantom	United Kingdom	251	Sunk
9 June 1917	Eugene Mathilde	France	15	Sunk
9 June 1917	Francois Georgette	France	7	Sunk
10 June 1917	Henri Jeanne	France	9	Sunk
10 June 1917	Madeleine	France	7	Sunk
11 June 1917	Eustace	United Kingdom	3,995	Damaged
11 June 1917	Huntsholm	United Kingdom	2,073	Sunk
11 June 1917	Margarita	United Kingdom	2,788	Damaged
12 June 1917	Alfred	United Kingdom	130	Sunk
27 June 1917	Solway Prince	United Kingdom	317	Sunk
28 June 1917	Marguerite	France	1,544	Sunk
28 June 1917	Northfield	United Kingdom	2,099	Damaged
30 June 1917	Borgund I	Norway	764	Sunk
30 June 1917	Chateau Yquem	France	1,913	Sunk
15 July 1917	Dinorwic	United Kingdom	124	Sunk
15 July 1917	Ebenezer	United Kingdom	177	Sunk
20 July 1917	L. H. Carl	United Kingdom	1,916	Sunk
20 July 1917	Salsette	United Kingdom	5,842	Sunk
22 July 1917	Rota	United Kingdom	2,171	Sunk
12 August 1917	Marie Alfred	France	159	Sunk
12 August 1917	Pauline Louisa	France	172	Sunk
14 August 1917	Tuddal	Norway	3,511	Sunk
15 August 1917	Brodstone	United Kingdom	4,927	Sunk
16 August 1917	Eastgate	United Kingdom	4,277	Damaged
19 August 1917	Glocliffe	United Kingdom	2,211	Sunk
21 September 1917	Radaas	Denmark	2,524	Sunk
22 September 1917	Greleen	United Kingdom	2,286	Sunk
23 September 1917	Rosehill	United Kingdom	2,788	Sunk
25 September 1917	City of Swansea	United Kingdom	1,375	Sunk
19 October 1917	Wellington	United Kingdom	5,600	Damaged
24 October 1917	Gallia	Kingdom of Italy	2,728	Sunk
25 October 1917	Gefion	United Kingdom	1,123	Sunk
28 October 1917	Redesmere	United Kingdom	2,123	Sunk
17 November 1917	Abaris	United Kingdom	2,892	Damaged
17 November 1917	Western Coast	United Kingdom	1,394	Sunk
19 November 1917	Aparima	United Kingdom	5,704	Sunk
9 December 1917	Sedbergh	United Kingdom	4,275	Damaged
27 January 1918	Carolus	Norway	1,041	Sunk
29 January 1918	Butetown	United Kingdom	1,829	Sunk
20 February 1918	Huntsmoor	United Kingdom	4,957	Sunk
25 February 1918	Nyanza	United Kingdom	6,695	Damaged
16 March 1918	Author	United Kingdom	5,586	Damaged
21 March 1918	Ikeda	United Kingdom	6,311	Sunk
18 April 1918	Pentyrch	United Kingdom	3,312	Sunk
26 May 1918	Dayspring	United Kingdom	57	Sunk
26 May 1918	Eclipse	United Kingdom	47	Sunk
26 May 1918	Fortuna	United Kingdom	61	Sunk
31 May 1918	Alert	United Kingdom	59	Sunk
3 June 1918	Antiope	United Kingdom	3,004	Damaged
6 June 1918	Active	United Kingdom	57	Sunk
6 June 1918	Beryl	United Kingdom	57	Sunk
6 June 1918	Dianthus	United Kingdom	51	Sunk
29 June 1918	Grekland	Sweden	2,751	Sunk
29 June 1918	Florentia	United Kingdom	3,688	Sunk
1 July 1918	Charing Cross	United Kingdom	2,534	Sunk
2 July 1918	Admiral	United Kingdom	102	Sunk
2 July 1918	Madeleine	France	158	Damaged
2 July 1918	Nord	France	409	Sunk
7 July 1918	Aby	United Kingdom	15	Sunk
7 July 1918	Albion	United Kingdom	22	Sunk
7 July 1918	Leeds	United Kingdom	161	Damaged
26 July 1918	Boy Jack	United Kingdom	57	Sunk
26 July 1918	Godesgenage	Belgium	40	Sunk
27 July 1918	Counsellor	United Kingdom	56	Sunk
27 July 1918	Fear Not	United Kingdom	59	Sunk
27 July 1918	I’ll Try	United Kingdom	51	Sunk
27 July 1918	Kirkham Abbey	United Kingdom	1,166	Sunk
27 July 1918	Le Bijou	United Kingdom	46	Sunk
27 July 1918	Paragon	United Kingdom	56	Sunk
27 July 1918	Passion Flower	United Kingdom	46	Sunk
27 July 1918	Success	United Kingdom	54	Sunk
27 July 1918	Valour	United Kingdom	39	Sunk
28 July 1918	Francis Robert	United Kingdom	44	Sunk

== Bibliography ==
- Bendert, Harald (2000). Die UB-Boote der Kaiserlichen Marine, 1914-1918. Einsätze, Erfolge, Schicksal (in German). Hamburg: Verlag E.S. Mittler & Sohn GmbH. ISBN 3-8132-0713-7.
- Gröner, Erich; Jung, Dieter; Maass, Martin (1991). U-boats and Mine Warfare Vessels. German Warships 1815–1945. Vol. 2. Translated by Thomas, Keith; Magowan, Rachel. London: Conway Maritime Press. ISBN 0-85177-593-4.
- Rössler, Eberhard (1979). Die deutschen U-Boote und ihre Werften: eine Bilddokumentation über den deutschen U-Bootbau; in zwei Bänden (in German). Vol. I. Munich: Bernard & Graefe. ISBN 3-7637-5213-7.
