= HMS E42 =

Submarine of the Royal Navy

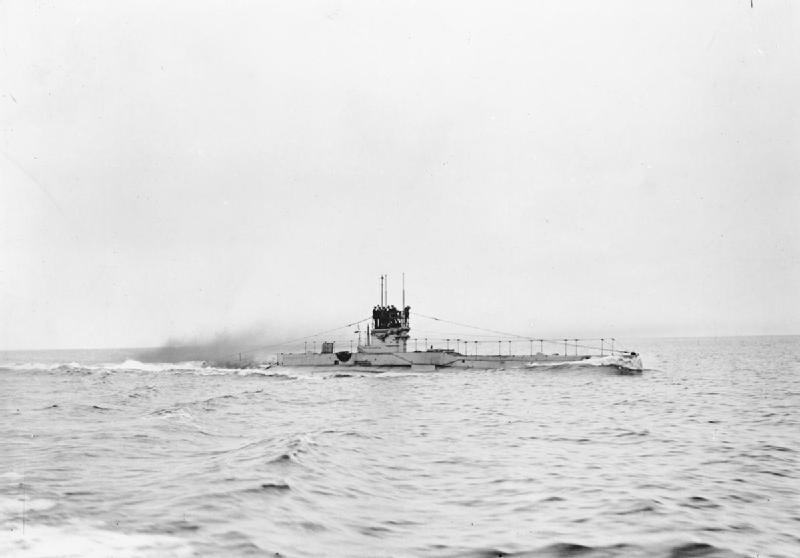
- HMS E42 on trials

History

United Kingdom
- Name: E42
- Builder: Cammell Laird, Birkenhead
- Launched: 22 October 1915
- Commissioned: July 1916
- Fate: Sold, 6 September 1922

General characteristics
- Class & type: E-class submarine
- Displacement: 662 long tons (673 t) surfaced; 807 long tons (820 t) submerged
- Length: 181 ft (55 m)
- Beam: 15 ft (4.6 m)
- Propulsion: 2 × 800 hp (597 kW) diesel; 2 × 420 hp (313 kW) electric; 2 screws
- Speed: 15 knots (28 km/h; 17 mph) surfaced; 10 knots (19 km/h; 12 mph) submerged
- Range: 3,000 nmi (5,600 km) at 10 kn (19 km/h; 12 mph) surfaced; 65 nmi (120 km) at 5 kn (9.3 km/h; 5.8 mph) surfaced
- Complement: 31
- Armament: 5 × 18 inch (450 mm) torpedo tubes (2 bow, 2 beam, 1 stern); 1 × 12-pounder gun

HMS E42 was a British E-class submarine built by Cammell Laird, Birkenhead. She was launched on 22 October 1915 and commissioned in July 1916. She served during the First World War, hitting with a torpedo the battlecruiser SMS Moltke on 25 April 1918 and making an unsuccessful attack on U-92 on 1 July 1918. E42 was sold for scrap at Poole on 6 September 1922.

== Design ==
Like all post-E8 British E-class submarines, E42 had a displacement of 662 long tons (673 t) at the surface and 807 long tons (820 t) while submerged. She had a total length of 180 feet (55 m) and a beam of 22 feet 8.5 inches (6.922 m). She was powered by two 800-horsepower (600 kW) Vickers eight-cylinder two-stroke diesel engines and two 420-horsepower (310 kW) electric motors. The submarine had a maximum surface speed of 16 knots (30 km/h; 18 mph) and a submerged speed of 10 knots (19 km/h; 12 mph). British E-class submarines had fuel capacities of 50 long tons (51 t) of diesel and ranges of 3,255 miles (5,238 km; 2,829 nmi) when travelling at 10 knots (19 km/h; 12 mph). E42 was capable of operating submerged for five hours when travelling at 5 knots (9.3 km/h; 5.8 mph).

E42 was armed with a 12-pounder 76 mm (3.0 in) QF gun mounted forward of the conning tower. She had five 18-inch (450 mm) torpedo tubes, two in the bow, one either side amidships, and one in the stern; a total of 10 torpedoes were carried.

E-Class submarines had wireless systems with 1-kilowatt (1.3 hp) power ratings; in some submarines, these were later upgraded to 3-kilowatt (4.0 hp) systems by removing a midship torpedo tube. Their maximum design depth was 100 feet (30 m) although in service some reached depths of below 200 feet (61 m). Some submarines contained Fessenden oscillator systems.
