= SM UB-103 =

WWI era German Navy U-boat

- UB-148 at sea, a U-boat similar to UB-103.

History

German Empire
- Name: UB-103
- Ordered: 6 / 8 February 1917
- Builder: Blohm & Voss, Hamburg
- Cost: 3,714,000 German Papiermark
- Yard number: 309
- Launched: 7 July 1917
- Commissioned: 18 December 1917
- Fate: Sunk 14 August 1918

General characteristics
- Class & type: Type UB III submarine
- Displacement: 510 t (500 long tons) surfaced; 629 t (619 long tons) submerged
- Length: 55.30 m (181 ft 5 in) (o/a)
- Beam: 5.80 m (19 ft)
- Draught: 3.70 m (12 ft 2 in)
- Propulsion: 2 × propeller shaft; 2 × MAN-Vulcan four-stroke 6-cylinder diesel engines, 1,085 bhp (809 kW); 2 × Siemens-Schuckert electric motors, 780 shp (580 kW)
- Speed: 13.3 knots (24.6 km/h; 15.3 mph) surfaced; 7.5 knots (13.9 km/h; 8.6 mph) submerged
- Range: 7,420 nmi (13,740 km; 8,540 mi) at 6 knots (11 km/h; 6.9 mph) surfaced; 55 nmi (102 km; 63 mi) at 4 knots (7.4 km/h; 4.6 mph) submerged
- Test depth: 50 m (160 ft)
- Complement: 3 officers, 31 men
- Armament: 5 × 50 cm (19.7 in) torpedo tubes (4 bow, 1 stern); 10 torpedoes; 1 × 8.8 cm (3.46 in) deck gun

Service record
- Part of: Flandern I Flotilla; 8 March – 14 August 1918
- Commanders: Kptlt. Paul Hundius; 18 December 1917 – 14 August 1918
- Operations: 6 patrols
- Victories: 15 merchant ships sunk (25,999 GRT)

SM UB-103 was a German Type UB III submarine or U-boat in the German Imperial Navy (German: Kaiserliche Marine) during World War I. She was commissioned on 18 December 1917 as SM UB-103. (Note: "SM" stands for "Seiner Majestät" (English: His Majesty's) and combined with the U for Unterseeboot would be translated as His Majesty's Submarine.)

UB-103 was sunk in the English Channel at 50°52′N 1°27′E by British warships and SSZ 1, a SSZ class airship. All hands were lost.

== Construction ==
She was built by Blohm & Voss of Hamburg and, after just under a year of construction, launched at Hamburg on 7 July 1917. UB-103 was commissioned later the same year, under the command of KptLt Paul Hundius. Like all Type UB III submarines, UB-103 carried 10 torpedoes and was armed with a 8.8 cm (3.46 in) deck gun. UB-103 had a crew of up to three officers and 31 men, and its cruising range was 7,420 nautical miles (13,740 km; 8,540 mi). UB-103 had a displacement of 510 t (500 long tons) while surfaced and 629 t (619 long tons) when submerged. Her engines enabled her to travel at 13.3 knots (24.6 km/h; 15.3 mph) when surfaced and 7.4 knots (13.7 km/h; 8.5 mph) when submerged.

== Summary of raiding history ==
Date	Name	Nationality	Tonnage (Note: Tonnages are in gross register tons)	Fate
20 March 1918	Eros	Sweden	858	Sunk
21 March 1918	Tyrhaug	United Kingdom	1,483	Sunk
24 March 1918	Anteros	United Kingdom	4,241	Sunk
22 April 1918	Eric Calvert	United Kingdom	1,862	Sunk
28 April 1918	Elba	United Kingdom	1,081	Sunk
2 May 1918	Thorsa	United Kingdom	1,319	Sunk
3 May 1918	Vasilefs Georgios	Greece	3,651	Sunk
10 June 1918	Borg	United Kingdom	2,111	Sunk
11 June 1918	Lorle	United Kingdom	2,686	Sunk
12 June 1918	Kul	United Kingdom	1,095	Sunk
11 July 1918	Kong Guttorm	Norway	731	Sunk
15 July 1918	Cap Breton	France	1,464	Sunk
15 July 1918	Vendee	France	892	Sunk
16 July 1918	Lyndiane	France	1,564	Sunk
21 July 1918	Arvor	France	961	Sunk

== Bibliography ==
- Bendert, Harald (2000). Die UB-Boote der Kaiserlichen Marine, 1914-1918. Einsätze, Erfolge, Schicksal (in German). Hamburg: Verlag E.S. Mittler & Sohn GmbH. ISBN 3-8132-0713-7.
- Gröner, Erich; Jung, Dieter; Maass, Martin (1991). U-boats and Mine Warfare Vessels. German Warships 1815–1945. Vol. 2. Translated by Thomas, Keith; Magowan, Rachel. London: Conway Maritime Press. ISBN 0-85177-593-4.
- Rössler, Eberhard (1979). Die deutschen U-Boote und ihre Werften: eine Bilddokumentation über den deutschen U-Bootbau; in zwei Bänden (in German). Vol. I. Munich: Bernard & Graefe. ISBN 3-7637-5213-7.
