= Naval Air Station Chatham =

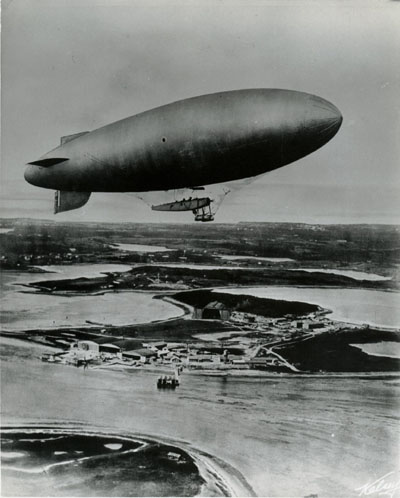
- Navy B-class blimp flying over the Chatham Naval Air Station in the summer of 1919.
- IATA: none; ICAO: none

Summary
- Airport type: Military: Naval Air Station
- Operator: United States Navy
- Location: Chatham, Massachusetts
- Built: 1917
- In use: 1917–1922
- Occupants: Navy
- Elevation AMSL: 1 ft / 0 m
- Coordinates: 41°43′0.58″N 069°57′55.92″W
- Interactive map of Naval Air Station Chatham

Runways
| Direction | Length | | Surface |
| Direction | ft | m | Surface |
|---|---|---|---|
| | | | Water |

Naval Air Station Chatham was an operational United States Navy airfield from 1917 to 1922. It was first established as a blimp base during World War I. It was located in Chatham, Massachusetts.

The base was one of the first operational naval air stations in the country. It helped to patrol the northeast United States coast and even participated in a skirmish off of Orleans. In 1922, the station was closed and the history of the base has largely been forgotten except for a lone marker near where the site used to be.

== History ==
=== Plans ===
As German U-boats began to get more emboldened by their successes, it became apparent to many that the United States would soon enter a war. As a result, the Department of the Navy planned six new Naval Air Stations on the East Coast. One just happened to be locate next to Pleasant Bay, near Chatham, Massachusetts. The planned station occupied 36 acres (15 ha) on Nickerson Neck.

=== Construction ===
Before the United States even entered World War I, construction of Chatham Naval Air Station was beginning. The original plans called for building living quarters for officers and enlisted men, hangars, a gas holder, boat house, hospital, pigeon loft, repair shops, garage and assorted storage and maintenance buildings. Pipes were laid in trenches and the nearest fresh water source was 3.5 miles (5.6 km) away. Worker Patrick Buckley died when the trench he was digging caved in on him.

By October, the barracks and mess hall were ready for furniture and galley equipment. The resulting structures could handle about 100 men. That same month, the flag pole was placed and 3,000 people were in attendance for its first raising. In November, the United States entered the war. In December, the skeleton of the blimp hangar was finished and wooden slats were soon covering them. Concrete was then set to be poured for the hangar floors. This was complicated by the fact that it was one of the coldest winters that year. As a result, the concrete was poured and protected by tar paper and hot sand. The sliding doors were then installed at the end of that February. The base was commissioned on 6 January 1918.

=== Patrols ===
By then, many buildings were ready for occupancy and by mid-March, four Curtiss R-9s were delivered to the Chatham Train Station. They were assembled and the first flight was made by Lt. McKitterick on 25 March. In July, four Curtiss HS-1L flying boats were delivered to the depot and trucked to the base. These boats were so urgently needed that they were put into service almost immediately. The addition of these boats increased the time available to patrols from dawn to dusk. Two patrol areas, aptly named Areas A and B were then created. Area A was to the north while Area B was to the south. Planes always went in pairs with one plane carrying a radio transmitter. The plane with the transmitter was required to radio in a location every ten minutes. Both planes carried two homing pigeons for emergency communication with the base; the birds had been trained for either the north patrol or the south patrol, and thus could not be transferred from one area to another. Planes were equipped with emergency rations and water for three days, a flashlight, flare pistol with red and green cartridges, a sea anchor, life preservers, signal book and local charts. Patrols took place at 1,000 feet (300 m) with the purpose to protect the shipping in a defined area. Often the planes would circle around a ship for hours while looking for U-boats after picking up the vessel in a predetermined location. While the two planes were out on patrol, two other planes and their fliers were on standby at the station, ready to assist should a plane radio in a distress call. If the planes and men could get airborne within seven minutes, they were considered to be within the acceptable range of response time. Eventually blimps were used to help in the patrol process. With their cruising speed of 35 mph (56 km/h) and a range of 900 miles (1,400 km), they were a useful asset in the patrols.

=== U-boat attack ===
One of the few known times when the station was utilized for the war was when a report came in of the shelling of nearby Nauset Beach. Nine Curtiss HS-2Ls were dispatched to bomb the submarine that had already sunk five ships and was proceeding to start shelling Orleans, Massachusetts. Either the resulting bombs were duds or they missed, and the U-boat got away.

=== Closure ===
In 1922, the base was closed, possibly because of the aftermath of the 1918 flu pandemic. The base was demolished in 1927 and the buildings and building materials were sold locally. The area was eventually redeveloped into a housing complex. In 1979, a stone memorial was placed at the end of Strong Island Road to commemorate the transatlantic Curtiss NC-4 flight, and in the 1980s two PBYs retraced that famous flight that passed by the station.

== See also ==
- List of military installations in Massachusetts
