= SS Waitemata =

New Zealand cargo liner

History
- Operator: Union Company
- Builder: William Hamilton and Company
- Launched: 28 February 1908
- Fate: Torpedoed and sunk on 14 July 1918

General characteristics
- Type: Cargo ship
- Length: 126.49 metres
- Beam: 16.46 metres
- Depth: 5.36 metres
- Propulsion: Single-screw, triple-expansion engines
- Speed: 10 knots

SS Waitemata was a 5,432-gross register ton (GRT) general cargo liner built in 1908 by William Hamilton and Company Limited of Glasgow for the Union Steam Ship Company.

== General details ==
Her yard number was 201, and she was registered at London as number 127801. Her dimensions were length 126.49 metres (415 ft 0 in), breadth 16.46 metres (54 ft 0 in), depth 5.36 metres (17 ft 7 in). She was powered by a Dunsmuir and Jackson Limited triple-expansion steam engine of 548 nominal horsepower. Her propulsion was a single screw giving her a speed of 10 knots (19 km/h; 12 mph).

== Career ==
Waitemata was launched on 28 February 1908 and delivered to the Union Steam Ship Company of New Zealand in April for their trans-Pacific cargo service.

In 1909 she took 1,200 mules from San Francisco to Fiji for the Colonial Sugar Refining Co.

During World War I she was used as a troopship. Her first journey was on 18 September 1915 as HMNZT 29 with the advance party of the 1st and 2nd Battalion NZ Rifle Brigade, 2nd Maori Contingent and details of the 6th Reinforcements of the New Zealand Expeditionary Force. There were a total of 630 troops under command of Major D B Mackenzie. They arrived in Egypt on 26 October 1915. On 12 February 1916 as HMNZT 45 she took the 3rd Battalion NZ Rifle Brigade and the Army Service Corps - Detachment No. 5 Company to Egypt under Major Jordan, arriving on 17 March 1916. This was followed on 26 July 1916 as HMNZT 59 with the 15th Reinforcements NZ Expeditionary Force, the 9th Reinforcements NZ Rifle Brigade 1st and 2nd Battalion, and the 6th Reinforcements NZ Rifle Brigade 3rd and 4th Battalions, which arrived in Egypt on 3 October 1916. There were total of 59 troops under Captain Dovey.

With the withdrawal from Gallipoli and transfer of troops to the Western Front on 19 January 1917 as HMNZT 75 she took the 13th Reinforcements Maori Contingent and part of the 21st Reinforcements NZ Expeditionary Force to Plymouth England. Arriving there on 27 March 1917. The troops aboard were under command of Lieutenant E V Daldy.

Her final voyage as a troop carrier from New Zealand was on 24 July 1917 under Captain Neilson, as HMNZT 89 with part of the 28th Reinforcements NZ Expeditionary Force. At Cape Town the South African authorities condemned the ship as unfit for carrying troops. The troops were then transhipped aboard Omrah and HMT Norman. The conscientious objector, Archibald Baxter along with 13 others, was shipped out of New Zealand on this voyage. The troops on this voyage were under Captain O'Shanessy. On this voyage there was also a ship board magazine published called Te Kiwi.

On 14 July 1918 while en route from Barry to Alexandria with a cargo of coal and calcium carbide she was torpedoed by the Imperial German Navy submarine UB-105 under Kapitänleutnant Wilhelm Marschall in the Mediterranean Sea 160 kilometres (99 mi) northeast of Marsa Susa and sunk. All aboard were rescued. Her final position was given as 33°21′N 24°10′E.
