= SM UB-113 =

- UB-148 at sea, a U-boat similar to UB-113.

History

German Empire
- Name: UB-113
- Ordered: 6 / 8 February 1917
- Builder: Blohm & Voss, Hamburg
- Cost: 3,714,000 German Papiermark
- Yard number: 319
- Launched: 23 September 1917
- Commissioned: 25 April 1918
- Fate: Lost September 1918

General characteristics
- Class & type: Type UB III submarine
- Displacement: 519 t (511 long tons) surfaced; 649 t (639 long tons) submerged
- Length: 55.30 m (181 ft 5 in) (o/a)
- Beam: 5.80 m (19 ft)
- Draught: 3.70 m (12 ft 2 in)
- Propulsion: 2 × propeller shaft; 2 × MAN-Vulcan four-stroke 6-cylinder diesel engines, 1,085 bhp (809 kW); 2 × Maffei electric motors, 780 shp (580 kW)
- Speed: 13.3 knots (24.6 km/h; 15.3 mph) surfaced; 7.5 knots (13.9 km/h; 8.6 mph) submerged
- Range: 7,420 nmi (13,740 km; 8,540 mi) at 6 knots (11 km/h; 6.9 mph) surfaced; 55 nmi (102 km; 63 mi) at 4 knots (7.4 km/h; 4.6 mph) submerged
- Test depth: 50 m (160 ft)
- Complement: 3 officers, 31 men
- Armament: 5 × 50 cm (19.7 in) torpedo tubes (4 bow, 1 stern); 10 torpedoes; 1 × 8.8 cm (3.46 in) deck gun

Service record
- Part of: Flandern II Flotilla; 24 July – 14 September 1918
- Commanders: Oblt.z.S. Ulrich Pilzecker; 25 April – 14 September 1918
- Operations: 2 patrols
- Victories: 3 merchant ships sunk (4,013 GRT)

SM UB-113 was a German Type UB III submarine or U-boat in the German Imperial Navy (German: Kaiserliche Marine) during World War I. She was commissioned into the German Imperial Navy on 25 April 1918 as SM UB-113. (Note: "SM" stands for "Seiner Majestät" (English: His Majesty's) and combined with the U for Unterseeboot would be translated as His Majesty's Submarine.)

UB-113 was lost in the autumn of 1918 for unknown reasons. According to recent sources, SM UB-113 probably crossed paths with the French gunboat l'Engageante on 29 August in the Gulf of Gascony and was sunk. Occasional confusion with the SM UB-123, which also met a mysterious fate, remains.

== Construction ==
She was built by Blohm & Voss of Hamburg and following just under a year of construction, launched in Hamburg on 23 September 1917. UB-113 was commissioned in the spring of the next year under the command of Oblt.z.S. Ulrich Pilzecker. Like all Type UB III submarines, UB-113 carried 10 torpedoes and was armed with an 8.8 cm (3.46 in) deck gun. UB-113 would carry a crew of up to 3 officers and 31 men and had a cruising range of 7,420 nautical miles (13,740 km; 8,540 mi). UB-113 had a displacement of 519 t (511 long tons) while surfaced and 649 t (639 long tons) when submerged. Her engines enabled her to travel at 13.3 knots (24.6 km/h; 15.3 mph) when surfaced and 7.4 knots (13.7 km/h; 8.5 mph) when submerged.

== Summary of raiding history ==
Date	Name	Nationality	Tonnage (Note: Tonnages are in gross register tons)	Fate
21 July 1918	Kongen	Norway	714	Sunk
17 August 1918	Eros	United Kingdom	1,122	Sunk
23 September 1918	Aldershot	United Kingdom	2,177	Sunk

== Bibliography ==
- Bendert, Harald (2000). Die UB-Boote der Kaiserlichen Marine, 1914-1918. Einsätze, Erfolge, Schicksal (in German). Hamburg: Verlag E.S. Mittler & Sohn GmbH. ISBN 3-8132-0713-7.
- Gröner, Erich; Jung, Dieter; Maass, Martin (1991). U-boats and Mine Warfare Vessels. German Warships 1815–1945. Vol. 2. Translated by Thomas, Keith; Magowan, Rachel. London: Conway Maritime Press. ISBN 0-85177-593-4.
- Rössler, Eberhard (1979). Die deutschen U-Boote und ihre Werften: eine Bilddokumentation über den deutschen U-Bootbau; in zwei Bänden (in German). Vol. I. Munich: Bernard & Graefe. ISBN 3-7637-5213-7.
