= Attack on Orleans =

1918 German U-boat raid off Massachusetts, US

- Part of the U-boat campaign of World War I
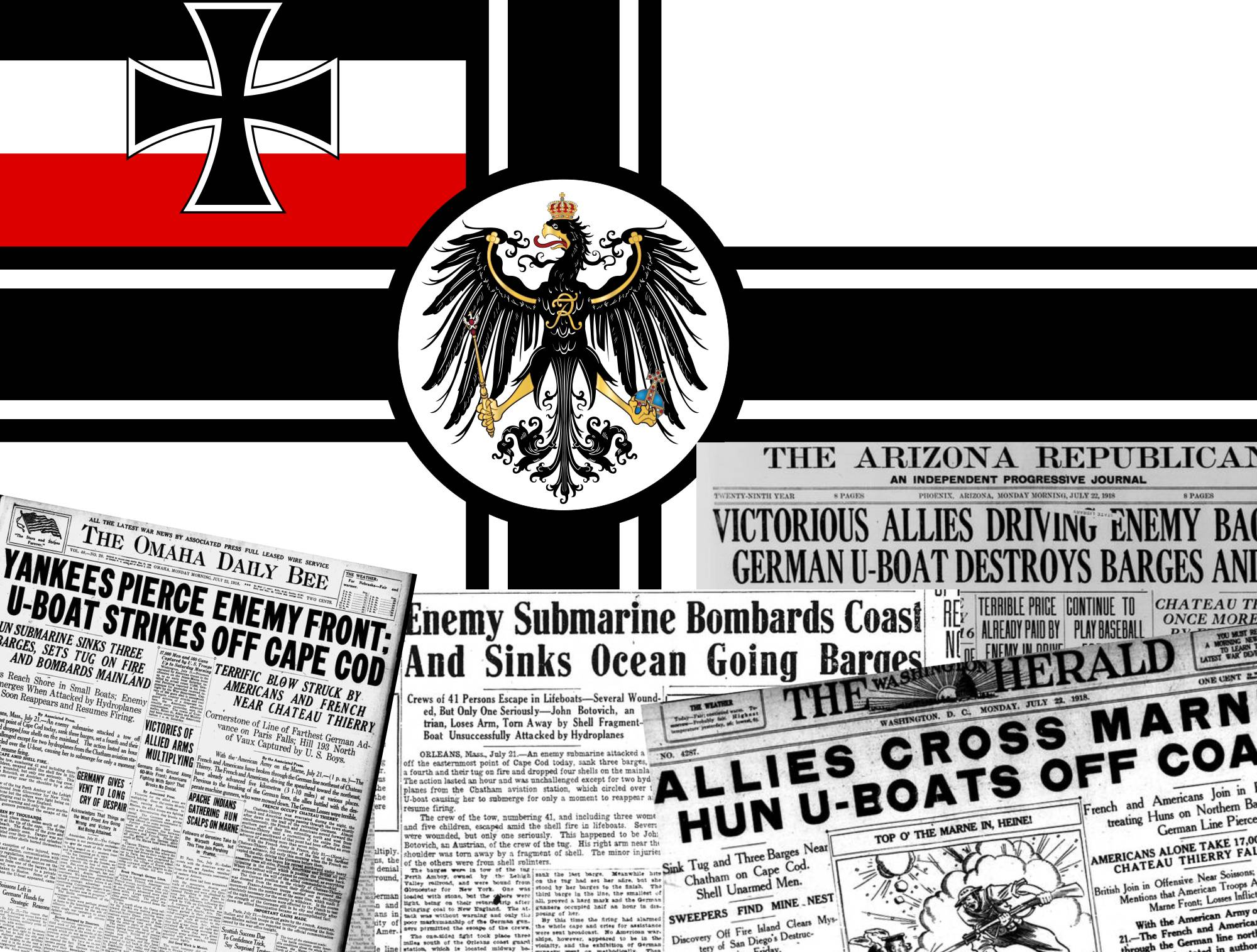
- Imperial German Ensign and US media coverage of the Attack on Orleans
| Date | 21 July 1918 |
| Location | Atlantic Ocean off Orleans, Massachusetts, United States 41°47′23″N 69°59′25″W |
| Result | German victory |

Belligerents
| United States | German Empire |

Commanders and leaders
| | (German Empire) Richard Feldt |

Strength
| Sea: Tugboat Perth Amboy; Schooner Lansford; 3 barges; Air: 9 Curtiss HS seaplanes | Submarine U-156 |

Casualties and losses
| Perth Amboy damaged; Lansford sunk; 3 barges sunk; no casualties | No casualties |

The attack on Orleans was a naval and air action during World War I on 21 July 1918 when U-156, a German submarine, that had sunk a US cruiser with a mine, a few days earlier, fired on a small convoy of barges led by a tugboat off Orleans, Massachusetts, on the eastern coast of the Cape Cod peninsula. A tug Perth Amboy, three barges and a schooner, also on tow were attacked. The tug was severely damaged and the barges and schooner were sunk. Several crewmen were wounded but none were killed. Four US Navy flying boats took off from a nearby base and bombed the U-boat but did not obtain any hits.

Members of the public who watched from the shore were startled when several shells fired during the engagement likely missed their intended maritime or aircraft targets and fell to earth in the area around Orleans, giving the impression of a deliberate attack on the town. The attack on Orleans was the only one on the contiguous United States during the war. It was also the first time that the United States was shelled by the artillery of an external power since the Siege of Fort Texas in 1846.

== Background ==
The German submarine U-156 (Kapitänleutnant Richard Feldt) was a minelayer that had been commissioned on 28 August 1917 and on 16 June 1918 sailed to US waters, to mine New York and patrol off New England, Nova Scoria and Newfoundland. On 19 July, about 10 nmi (19 km; 12 mi) south-east of Fire Island, off Long Island, one its mines sank the US cruiser USS San Diego, the largest US Navy ship lost in the war, with six men killed.

== Action ==
On the morning of 21 July 1918, the crew of U-156 might have been trying to cut the trans-Atlantic submarine communications cable from Orleans to Brest, France. While in the area for the buried cable, Feldt discovered the passing tugboat Perth Amboy towing Barge 766, Barge 703, Barge 740 and the three-masted schooner Lansford. In 2015, Jake Klim wrote that some accounts have U-156 firing two torpedoes but these were probably shells that missed their target or were warning shots across the Perth Amboy's bow. It is unlikely the U-156 would have wasted torpedoes on a group of small unarmed ships. U-156 then appeared 3 nmi (5.6 km; 3.5 mi) off Orleans and fired her two deck guns at the tug and her tow. Perth Amboy was severely damaged and the schooner and three barges were sunk.

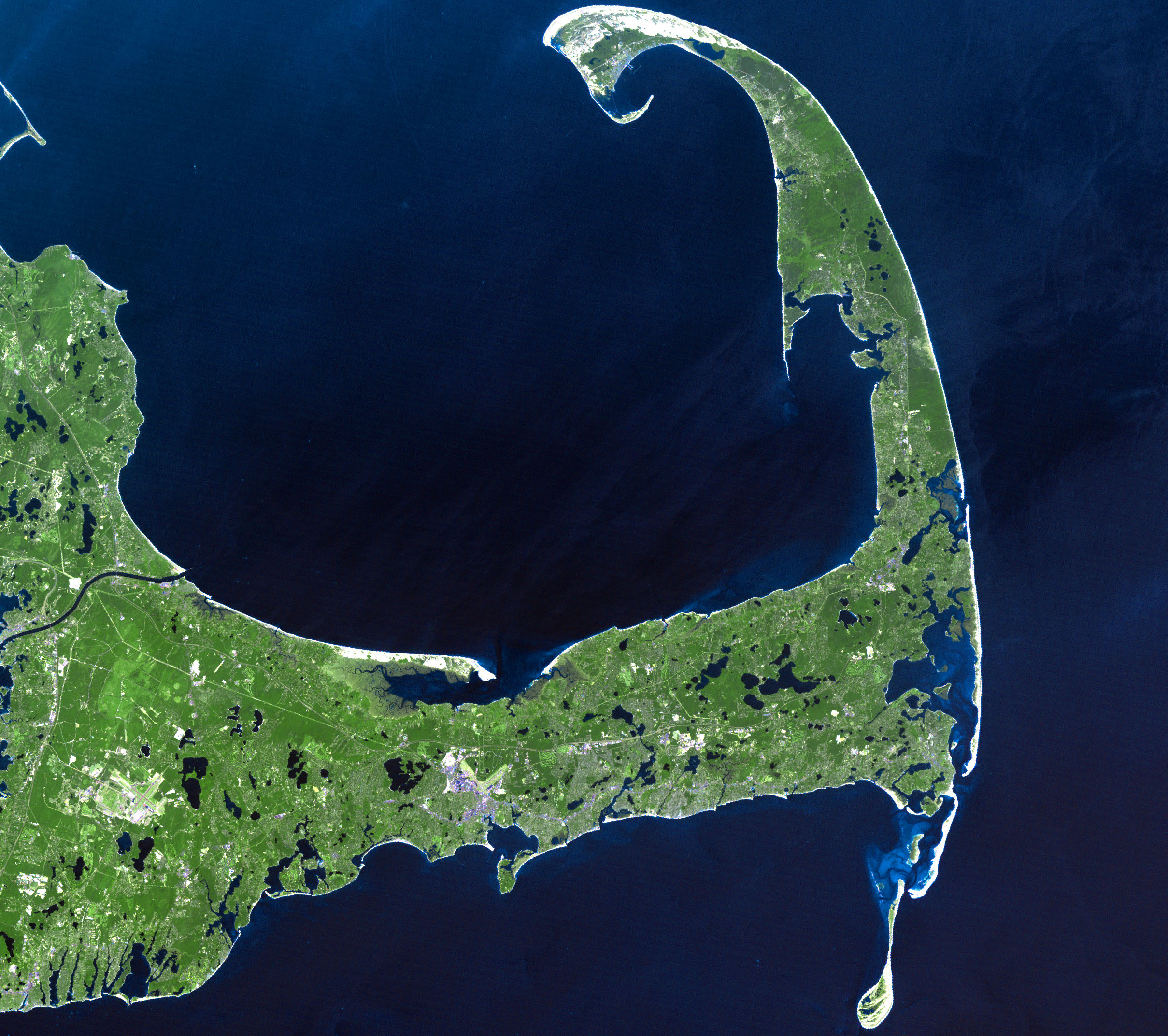
A view of Cape Cod, the location of Orleans, from space.

Four Curtiss HS-2L flying boats from the new Naval Air Station Chatham dropped bombs near U-156 but the bombs failed to explode due to technical problems or because the airmen on watch that Sunday were inexperienced at arming the bombs. U-156 elevated her guns to fire at the aircraft but missed. Some shells landed harmlessly in a deserted marsh and on Nauset Beach, giving the town of Orleans the distinction of being the only spot in the United States that received enemy fire during the war but there is no evidence that these were deliberately aimed at the shore. There were no targets of value in the area other than the vessels. There were no fatalities. Nearby, Station No. 40 of the United States Coast Guard launched a surfboat under heavy enemy shellfire and rowed out to rescue the 32 sailors trapped aboard the tug and barges. After firing 147 shells in the hour-long engagement, U-156 submerged at about 11:30 a.m.

A sign above the beach commemorates the engagement,

Three miles offshore, in the direction of the arrow, was the scene of attack of a German submarine on a tug and barges July 21, 1918. Several shells struck the beach. This is the only section of the United States' coast shelled by the enemy during World War I.

== Aftermath ==
U-156 escaped and headed north, where she attacked other Allied ships. A few shells and craters were found on shore in Orleans and in the nearby marsh. Newspapers dubbed the engagement the "Battle of Orleans" and offered a reward for the discovery of submarine supply bases in the Bay of Fundy. The attack on Orleans was the only Central Powers attack on the contiguous United States during the war. It was also the first time that the United States was shelled by the artillery of an external power since the Siege of Fort Texas in 1846.

The US government took over the Cape Cod Canal to avoid the longer and dangerous coastal route and from 1 August, coal traffic was transferred from Port Richmond, Philadelphia to Port Reading, New Jersey. Coal from New England was to be carried via the East River, Long Island Sound and the Cape Cod Canal, a much safer route.

On 24 September, Feldt sent a signal to U-boat command that he would be passing the Northern Barrage, at the north end of the North Sea, the next day and would signal again, according to procedure, when through but none was sent. U-156 was sunk on 25 September, one of five U-boats sunk in a few days and it was surmised by the Germans that U-156 had sprung a mine and been lost.

== See also ==
- Attacks on the United States
